= List of French films of 1941 =

A list of films produced in France in 1941:

== A–L ==
| Title | Director | Cast | Genre | Notes |
|---|---|---|---|---|
| The Acrobat | Jean Boyer | Fernandel, Jean Tissier, Thérèse Dorny | Comedy | |
| The Black Diamond | Jean Delannoy | Charles Vanel, Gaby Morlay, Louise Carletti | Drama | |
| The Chain Breaker | Jacques Daniel-Norman | Pierre Fresnay, Blanchette Brunoy, Ginette Leclerc | Comedy drama | |
| First Ball | Christian-Jaque | Marie Déa, Fernand Ledoux, Raymond Rouleau | Comedy | |
| Foolish Husbands | Marcel L'Herbier | Fernand Gravey, Marie Déa, Micheline Presle | Comedy | |
| Happy Days | Jean de Marguenat | Pierre Richard-Willm, François Périer, Juliette Faber | Comedy | |
| Hopes | Willy Rozier | Constant Rémy, Pierre Larquey, Robert Lynen | Drama | |
| The Italian Straw Hat | Maurice Cammage | Fernandel, Josseline Gaël, Fernand Charpin | Comedy | |
| The Last of the Six | Georges Lacombe | Pierre Fresnay, Michèle Alfa, Suzy Delair | Mystery | |

== M–Z ==
| Title | Director | Cast | Genre | Notes |
|---|---|---|---|---|
| Madame Sans-Gêne | Roger Richebé | Arletty, Aimé Clariond, Maurice Escande | Historical | |
| The Master Valet | Paul Mesnier | Elvire Popesco, Henri Garat, Marguerite Deval | Comedy | |
| Montmartre | Georges Lacombe | Édith Piaf, Jean-Louis Barrault, Roger Duchesne | Romance | |
| Moulin Rouge | André Hugon, Yves Mirande | Lucien Baroux, René Dary, Annie France | Comedy | |
| Notre-Dame de la Mouise | Robert Péguy | Édouard Delmont, Odette Joyeux, François Rozet | Drama | |
| Parade en sept nuits | Marc Allégret | Micheline Presle, Raimu, Elvire Popesco | Comedy | |
| The Pavilion Burns | Jacques de Baroncelli | Pierre Renoir, Jean Marais, Michèle Alfa | Drama | |
| Portrait of Innocence | Louis Daquin | Louise Carletti, Gilbert Gil, André Brunot | Drama | |
| Premier rendez-vous | Henri Decoin | Danielle Darrieux, Louis Jourdan, Fernand Ledoux | Comedy | |
| Romance of Paris | Jean Boyer | Charles Trenet, Jean Tissier, Yvette Lebon | Musical | |
| Sins of Youth | Maurice Tourneur | Harry Baur, Lise Delamare, Monique Joyce | Drama | |
| Stormy Waters | Jean Grémillon | Jean Gabin, Madeleine Renaud, Michèle Morgan | Drama | |
| Strange Suzy | Pierre-Jean Ducis | Suzy Prim, Claude Dauphin, Marguerite Moreno | Comedy | |
| The Suitors Club | Maurice Gleize | Fernandel, Louise Carletti, Annie France | Comedy | |
| The Tale of the Fox | Irene Starevich; Ladislas Starevich | | Animation/ Fantasy | Without soundtrack, completed 1930 w/ German soundtrack 1937 |
| Those of the Sky | Yvan Noé | Marie Bell, Pierre Renoir, Jean Servais | Drama | |
| Three Argentines in Montmartre | André Hugon | Georges Rigaud, Pierre Brasseur, Milly Mathis | Musical | |
| Volpone | Maurice Tourneur, Jacques de Baroncelli | Harry Baur, Louis Jouvet, Jean Témerson | Comedy | |
| Who Killed Santa Claus? | Christian-Jaque | Harry Baur, Raymond Rouleau, Robert Le Vigan | Mystery | |

== See also ==
- 1941 in France
