= Hyménée =

1947 film

- Directed by: Émile Couzinet
- Screenplay by: Émile Couzinet
- Based on: Hyménée by Édouard Bourdet
- Produced by: Émile Couzinet
- Starring: Gaby Morlay; Maurice Escande; Pierre Magnier
- Cinematography: Scarciafico Hugo
- Edited by: Émile Couzinet
- Music by: René Sylviano
- Production company: Burgus Films
- Release date: 2 May 1947
- Running time: 95 minutes
- Country: France
- Language: French

Hyménée is a 1947 French drama film directed by Émile Couzinet. Starring Gaby Morlay, Maurice Escande, and Pierre Magnier, the film was shot in Bordeaux at the Studios de la Côte d'Argent in Gironde.

== Plot ==
Although Pierre is married, he is in love with his sister in law Marianne, while he is loved by his cousin Agnés, a spinster. Marianne loves him but she prefers to marry Rémy, and ultimately Agnés leaves Pierre to his wife and kids.

== Cast ==
- Gaby Morlay as Agnès d'Aubarède
- Maurice Escande as Pierre Vairon
- Pierre Magnier as the general
- Colette Richard as Marianne
- Bernard Lancret as Rémi
- Alice Field as Juliette
- Gabrielle Robinne as Madame d'Aubarède
- Marthe Marsans as Madame Vairon
- Monette Pascale
