= Marie Antoinette Queen of France =

1956 film

Marie Antoinette, Queen of France
- Directed by: Jean Delannoy
- Written by: Jean Delannoy; Philippe Erlanger; Bernard Zimmer
- Produced by: Joseph Bercholz; Henry Deutschmeister; Edouard Gide; Angelo Rizzoli
- Starring: Michèle Morgan; Richard Todd; Jacques Morel
- Cinematography: Pierre Montazel
- Edited by: Henri Taverna
- Music by: Jacque-Simonot
- Production companies: Franco London Films; Les Films Gibé; Rizzoli Film
- Distributed by: Gaumont Distribution
- Release date: 27 April 1956
- Running time: 120 minutes
- Countries: France; Italy
- Language: French
- Box office: 2,280,704 admissions (France)

Marie Antoinette Queen of France (French: Marie-Antoinette reine de France and also known as Shadow of the Guillotine) is a 1956 French-Italian historical drama film directed by Jean Delannoy who co-wrote the screenplay with Pierre Erlanger and Bernard Zimmer. The film stars Michèle Morgan and Richard Todd. It was nominated for the Palme d'Or (Jean Delannoy) at the 1956 Cannes Film Festival.

The film was shot in England and French versions. Richard Todd says Nancy Mitford wrote the English language script.

It was shot at the Billancourt Studios in Paris. The film's sets were designed by the art director René Renoux. Todd recalled "Delannois’ style of direction bothered me. He was most meticulous and had worked out every move and gesture himself prior to rehearsal. This I found inhibiting: I didn’t always feel it natural to move exactly where and when he had done, or to gesticulate as he had in his very Gallic and excitable way. I know that Michéle frequently had the same difficulty; most often we played the scenes our own way in the English version, but tried to follow his instructions in the French one. He was a renowned director and a patient, charming man, but not easy for me to work with."

== Cast ==
- Michèle Morgan as Marie-Antoinette
- Richard Todd as le comte Axel de Fersen
- Jacques Morel as Louis XVI
- Aimé Clariond as Louis XV
- Jeanne Boitel as Mme Campan
- Guy Tréjan as La Fayette
- Marina Berti as a comtesse de Polignac
- Marcelle Arnold as Mme. Adélaïde
- Jane Marken as Mme Victoire
- Jacques Dufilho as Marat
- Daniel Ceccaldi as Drouet
- Madeleine Rousset as Mme de Tourzel
- Suzy Carrier as Mme Elisabeth
- Paul Bonifas as Herman
- Jacques Bergerac as le comte de Provence
- Edmond Beauchamp as Comte de Luxembourg
- Yves Brainville as Danton
- Anne Carrère asMme Du Barry
- Daniel Ceccaldi as Drouet
- Jean Claudio as Fouquier-Tinville
- Anne Doat as Rosalie
- Jacques Eyser as Joad
- Claudio Gora as Kreutz
- Camille Guérini as Necker
- Jean Hébey as Marquis de Migennes
- Jacques Hilling as Duc de Brunswick
- Georges Lannes as d'Avaray
- Jacques Marin as Crieur de journaux
- Raphaël Patorni as Duc de Choiseul
- Michel Piccoli as Le Prêtre réfractaire
- Marcel Pérès as Simon
- Frédéric Valmain as Comte d'Artois
- Jean Vinci as Toulan
- Michel Piccoli as le prêtre
- Jacques Morlaine as Un officier
- André Chanu as Le Prêtre assermenté
- Georgette Anys as Une émeutière
- Pierre Moncorbier as Le greffier

== Bibliography ==
- Hayward, Susan. French Costume Drama of the 1950s: Fashioning Politics in Film. Intellect Books, 2010.
- Zea, Zahra Tavassoli . Balzac Reframed: The Classical and Modern Faces of Éric Rohmer and Jacques Rivette. Springer Nature, 2019.
