= Le Destin fabuleux de Désirée Clary =

- Directed by: Sacha Guitry with the technical collaboration of René Le Hénaff
- Written by: Sacha Guitry
- Starring: Jean-Louis Barrault; Aimé Clariond; Gaby Morlay; Yvette Lebon
- Music by: Adolphe Borchard
- Distributed by: Compagnie Commerciale Française Cinématographique
- Release date: September 5, 1942
- Country: France
- Language: French

Le Destin fabuleux de Désirée Clary (Mlle. Desiree) is a French film released in September 1942, black and white, written and directed by Sacha Guitry. The film concerns the life of Désirée Clary, the daughter of a Marseilles merchant, who became Queen of Sweden and the founder of a dynasty.

== Plot ==
Julie and Désirée Clary are courted by the brothers Joseph and Napoleon Bonaparte. Joseph marries Julie and Napoleon is affianced to Désirée. When Napoleon breaks the engagement and marries Joséphine de Beauharnais, Désirée becomes involved with General Bernadotte.

== Cast ==
- Sacha Guitry as Narrator
- Jean-Louis Barrault as Napoléon Bonaparte
- Aimé Clariond as Joseph Bonaparte
- Jacques Varennes as Jean-Baptiste Bernadotte, then Charles XIV John of Sweden
- Geneviève Guitry as Désirée Clary, as a young woman
- Gaby Morlay as Désirée Clary
- Lise Delamare as Joséphine de Beauharnais
- Yvette Lebon as Julie Clary
- Camille Fournier as Julie Bonaparte
- Georges Grey as Junot
- Jean Hervé as Talma
- Jeanne Fusier-Gir as Albertine, servant
- Germaine Laugier as Madame Clary
- Pierre Magnier as Monsieur Clary
- Jean Périer as Talleyrand
- Noël Roquevert as Fouché
- Maurice Teynac as Marmont
- Jean Darcante as Duphot
- Jean Davy as Berthier
- Georges Spanelly as Davout
- Georges Tourreil as Cambronne
- Renaud Mary as le docteur Antommarchi
- Maurice Lagrenée as Duke of Richelieu
- Roger Vincent as Charles XIII of Sweden
- Gaston Mauger as Louis XVIII of France
