= Jacques Hilling =

French actor (1922–1975)

- Born: 26 May 1922; Randwick, Australia
- Died: 16 February 1975 (aged 52); Paris, France
- Occupation: Actor
- Years active: 1949–1975

Jacques Hilling (26 May 1922 – 16 February 1975) was a French film actor. He appeared in more than 90 films between 1949 and 1975.

== Selected filmography ==
- Return to Life (1949) - Un soldat (segment 4 : "Le retour de René") (uncredited)
- Rendezvous in July (1949) - Bit part (uncredited)
- The Red Rose (1951) - M. Guillet
- Good Enough to Eat (1951) - Pou - le frère de Madame de Mergrand
- Pas de vacances pour Monsieur le Maire (1951) - Le docteur
- The Respectful Prostitute (1952) - L'ivrogne du night-club
- Open Letter (1953) - Le flic - M. Pépin
- Les Compagnes de la nuit (1953) - Le concierge (uncredited)
- Thérèse Raquin (1953)
- Virgile (1953) - Le professeur
- Le Guérisseur (1953) - Un journaliste
- Les hommes ne pensent qu'à ça (1954) - Le roi Dagobert / Un marcheur
- Les Diaboliques (1955) - L'employé de la morgue
- French Cancan (1955) - Le chirurgien (uncredited)
- Bedevilled (1955) - Taxi Driver (uncredited)
- Madelon (1955) - Soldat
- On déménage le colonel (1955) - Auguste
- Marie Antoinette Queen of France (1956) - Duc de Brunswick
- Meeting in Paris (1956) - Le poissonnier écailleur (uncredited)
- Toute la ville accuse (1956)
- Gervaise (1956) - M. Boche - le mari de la concierge
- Elena and Her Men (1956) - Lisbonne
- La Famille Anodin (1956, TV Series)
- Paris, Palace Hotel (1956) - Le cuistot
- Crime and Punishment (1956) - Le concierge (uncredited)
- The Hunchback of Notre Dame (1956) - Maitre Charmolue
- Que les hommes sont bêtes (1957) - Le commissaire
- Le grand bluff (1957) - Marcel Poitevin
- La peau de l'ours (1957) - Le chauffeur de taxi
- Les Espions (1957) - Un espion (uncredited)
- Amour de poche (1957) - Le professeur
- The Tricyclist (1957) - L'entraîneur du club
- Mam'zelle Souris (1957)
- Maigret Sets a Trap (1958) - Le médecin légiste
- Elevator to the Gallows (1958) - Le garagiste
- It's All Adam's Fault (1958)
- Les Jeux dangereux (1958) - L'inspecteur
- Clara et les méchants (1958) - Le professeur de gymnastique
- The Female (1959) - Le serveur
- Guinguette (1959) - Doctor
- Bobosse (1959) - (uncredited)
- Babette Goes to War (1959) - Captain
- Maigret and the Saint-Fiacre Case (1959) - Le garçon de café bavard
- Les Liaisons dangereuses (1959) - Un invité des Valmont (uncredited)
- Rue des prairies (1959) - Le patron de l'hôtel Stella
- Quai du Point-du-Jour (1960) - Un ouvrier (uncredited)
- Le Baron de l'écluse (1960) - Le surveillant des jeux
- Bouche cousue (1960) - Polo
- Le mouton (1960) - L'inspecteur Lenfant
- The Truth (1960) - Un client du 'Spoutnik'
- Les portes claquent (1960) - Le chauffeur
- The End of Belle (1961)
- La Princesse de Clèves (1961) - Le Médecin
- Please, Not Now! (1961) - L'opéré de la jambe
- The Three Musketeers (1961) - La Chesnaye
- The Fabiani Affair (1962) - Grenier (uncredited)
- Le bateau d'Émile (1962)
- Cartouche (1962) - L'aubergiste
- Lemmy pour les dames (1962) - Le directeur de l'hôtel
- Le Chevalier de Pardaillan (1962) - Le chambellan du duc de Guise
- L'abominable homme des douanes (1963) - Police Officer Joly
- People in Luck (1963) - Le journaliste (segment "Une nuit avec une vedette")
- Les vierges (1963) - Le patron de Berthet
- À toi de faire... mignonne (1963)
- Thank You, Natercia (1963) - Petit rôle (uncredited)
- Hardi Pardaillan! (1964) - Le notaire
- Une ravissante idiote (1964) - Le Lord-Admiral
- Shadow of Evil (1964) - Professor Hogby
- Angélique, Marquise des Anges (1964) - Molines
- Marvelous Angelique (1965) - Molines
- Marie-Chantal contre le docteur Kha (1965) - (uncredited)
- L'Or du duc (1965)
- Angelique and the King (1965) - Molinès (uncredited)
- Brigade antigangs (1966) - Le monsieur du stade
- Two for the Road (1967) - Hotel Concierge (uncredited)
- Darling Caroline (1968) - L'homme du relais (uncredited)
- Catherine, il suffit d'un amour (1969) - Polyte
- Elle boit pas, elle fume pas, elle drague pas, mais... elle cause ! (1970) - Le fêtard avec Francine (uncredited)
- Trop petit mon ami (1970) - Le médecin légiste
- Le Cri du cormoran le soir au-dessus des jonques (1971) - Le second client du "sexy shop"
- Le drapeau noir flotte sur la marmite (1971) - Fernand
- Daisy Town (1971) - (voice)
- Le Viager (1972) - Le président du tribunal
- The Day of the Jackal (1973) - Hotel Desk Clerk (uncredited)
- The Clockmaker (1974) - Costes - un journaliste
- Que la fête commence (1975) - L'abbé Gratellard
- The Twelve Tasks of Asterix (1975) - (voice)
