= St. Val's Mystery =

1945 film

- French language poster
- (French: Le Mystère de Saint-Val)
- Directed by: René Le Hénaff
- Written by: Albert Bossy; Jean Manse; Yves Mirande
- Produced by: Édouard Harispuru
- Starring: Fernandel; Jean Davy; Marcel Carpentier; Marcel Pérès
- Cinematography: Victor Arménise
- Edited by: Marinette Cadix
- Music by: René Sylviano
- Color process: Black and white
- Production company: Studios de Boulogne
- Distributed by: Compagnie Commerciale Française Cinématographique
- Release date: 19 September 1945 (France)
- Running time: 102 minutes
- Country: France
- Language: French
- Box office: 2,397,153 admissions (France)

St. Val's Mystery (original: French: Le Mystère de Saint-Val) is a 1945 French comedy film starring Fernandel directed by René Le Hénaff, Shot during the winter of 1944–1945 in the Boulogne Studios, this was the Fernandel's first film following the liberation of Paris.

The film's original release title is Le mystère Saint-Val, and it was released in the United States in 1945 under the English title of St. Val's Mystery. It was then released in Denmark on 23 October 1950 as Det mystiske slot and in Portugal on 1 June 1954 as Fernandel, Polícia Amador.

== Plot ==
An insurance-office clerk Désiré Le Sec (Fernandel) dreams of being a great detective. The clerk's uncle (Marcel Carpentier) is his boss at that agency, and sends Désiré out on a frivolous mission to Saint-Val Castle, where the master of places has been found dead through mysterious circumstances. Désiré uncovers a real life murder and becomes mixed up with the murder case, ending up spending a night in the forbidding and spooky old Saint-Val castle.

== Cast ==
- Fernandel as Désiré Le Sec
- Jean Davy as Max Robertal
- Marcel Carpentier as L'oncle de Désiré
- Marcel Pérès as Le brigadier
- Erno Crisa as Le vagabond
- Jean Dasté as L'huissier
- Alexandre Rignault as Antoine
- Pierre Renoir as Dartignac
- Paul Demange
- Viviane Gosset as Suzy
- Arlette Guttinguer as Rose
- Germaine Kerjean as Madame De Saint-Val
- Maxime Fabert

== Reception ==
The film was a big hit in France, recording admissions of 2,397,153.

James Travers of Film de France offered that the film appears to have borrowed its plot from Ten Little Indians but with a "decidedly unfunny comic twist". When seen with the now-removed musical numbers it contained in its original release, the film "was probably more digestible". Summarizing, Travers felt the gags were predictable, the plot "hackneyed and pedestrian", and the "unimaginative pay-off definitely does not reward" the viewer., concluding that this marked the film as "clearly not Fernandel's finest hour".
