= Roger Legris =

French actor

- Born: Jean Roger Legris; 3 July 1898; Malakoff, France
- Died: 22 May 1981 (aged 82); Le Kremlin-Bicêtre, France
- Occupation: Actor
- Years active: 1933–1963

Roger Legris (3 July 1898 – 22 May 1981) was a French actor.

== Selected filmography ==
- On the Streets (1933)
- Skylark (1934)
- The House on the Dune (1934)
- The Devil in the Bottle (1935)
- Counsel for Romance (1936)
- The Great Refrain (1936)
- Wells in Flames (1937)
- Southern Mail (1937)
- Pépé le Moko (1937)
- Life Dances On (1937)
- Miarka (1937)
- The Lie of Nina Petrovna (1937)
- Courrier sud (1937)
- Port of Shadows (1938)
- Mollenard (1938)
- The Rebel (1938)
- The Novel of Werther (1938)
- Troubled Heart (1938)
- The West (1938)
- Vidocq (1939)
- Cristobal's Gold (1940)
- Narcisse (1940)
- Moulin Rouge (1941)
- The Last of the Six (1941)
- White Patrol (1942)
- Various Facts About Paris (1950)
- The Treasure of Cantenac (1950)
- Good Enough to Eat (1951)
- Robinson Crusoeland (1951)
- The Green Glove (1952)
- The Babes in the Secret Service (1956)
- A Certain Monsieur Jo (1958)
- Un drôle de paroissien (1963)
- Your Money or Your Life (1966)
