= His Uncle from Normandy =

1939 film

- Belgian poster
- Directed by: Jean Dréville
- Written by: Jean-Henri Blanchon; Paul Mesnier; Léo Mora
- Starring: Josseline Gaël; Jules Berry; Betty Stockfeld
- Cinematography: Georges Asselin; Paul Cotteret
- Edited by: Raymond Leboursier
- Music by: Georges Auric
- Production company: Codo Film
- Distributed by: Radio Cinéma
- Release date: 8 June 1939
- Running time: 80 minutes
- Country: France
- Language: French

His Uncle from Normandy (French: Son oncle de Normandie) is a 1939 French comedy film directed by Jean Dréville and starring Josseline Gaël, Jules Berry and Betty Stockfeld. Produced in 1938, it was not given a release until June of the following year. The film's sets were designed by the art directors Louis Le Barbenchon and Roland Quignon.

== Cast ==
- Eddy Lombard as Jim Baxter
- Josseline Gaël as Brigitte
- Jules Berry as Joseph
- Pierre Larquey as Maître Curot
- Betty Stockfeld as Anna Carola
- Albert Broquin as Le gardien
- Paul Demange as Monsieur Claudinet
- Anthony Gildès as Le sourd
- Janine Merrey as Mélanie
- Alexandre Mihalesco as Le Piqué
- René Navarre as Le capitaine
- Georges Paulais as L'avocat général
- Gabrielle Rosny as La marchande de liqueurs
- Pierre Stéphen as Ambroise, le clerc de notaire
- Dahl Stockfeld as La secrétaire
- Marcel Vallée as Le président

== Bibliography ==
- Roust, Colin. Georges Auric: A Life in Music and Politics. Oxford University Press, 2020.
