= Her Final Role =

1946 film

- Directed by: Jean Gourguet
- Written by: Lajos Zilahy (play); Jean-Paul Le Chanois
- Starring: Gaby Morlay; Jean Debucourt; Marcel Dalio
- Music by: René Sylviano
- Production company: Société Française de Production
- Distributed by: Union Française de Production Cinématographique
- Release date: 24 July 1946
- Running time: 90 minutes
- Country: France
- Language: French

Her Last Part or Her Final Role (French: Son dernier rôle) is a 1946 French drama film directed by Jean Gourguet and starring Gaby Morlay, Jean Debucourt and Marcel Dalio. A top actress discovers that she is seriously ill.

== Cast ==
- Gaby Morlay as Hermine Wood
- Jean Debucourt as Le professeur Mercier
- Marcel Dalio as Ardouin
- Jean Tissier as L'hôtelier
- Georges Chamarat as Le suicidé
- Germaine Charley
- Paula Dehelly
- Paul Demange
- Gabrielle Fontan
- Germaine Ledoyen
- Héléna Manson
- Nina Myral
- Roger Vincent

== Bibliography ==
- Rège, Philippe. Encyclopedia of French Film Directors, Volume 1. Scarecrow Press, 2009.
