= Albert Malbert =

French actor

- Born: 27 February 1914; Bordeaux, France
- Died: 10 August 1972 (aged 58); Bergerac, Dordogne, France
- Occupation: Actor
- Years active: 1933-1953 (film)

Albert Malbert (1914–1972) was a French film actor.

== Selected filmography ==
- The Crisis is Over (1934)
- Return to Paradise (1935)
- Bach the Detective (1936)
- Moutonnet (1936)
- The Brighton Twins (1936)
- Culprit (1937)
- Tricoche and Cacolet (1938)
- Crossroads (1938)
- Rasputin (1938)
- The Fatted Calf (1939)
- Threats (1940)
- The Last of the Six (1941)
- The Man Who Played with Fire (1942)
- Annette and the Blonde Woman (1942)
- Love Marriage (1942)
- Private Life (1942)
- Le Corbeau (1943)
- The Stairs Without End (1943)
- Sowing the Wind (1944)
- Boule de suif (1945)
- The Lost Village (1947)
- Eternal Conflict (1948)
- Clochemerle (1948)
- The Farm of Seven Sins (1949)
- The Heroic Monsieur Boniface (1949)
- Véronique (1950)
- Cartouche, King of Paris (1950)

== Bibliography ==
- Goble, Alan. The Complete Index to Literary Sources in Film. Walter de Gruyter, 1999.
