= Marcelle Géniat =

French actress (1881–1959)

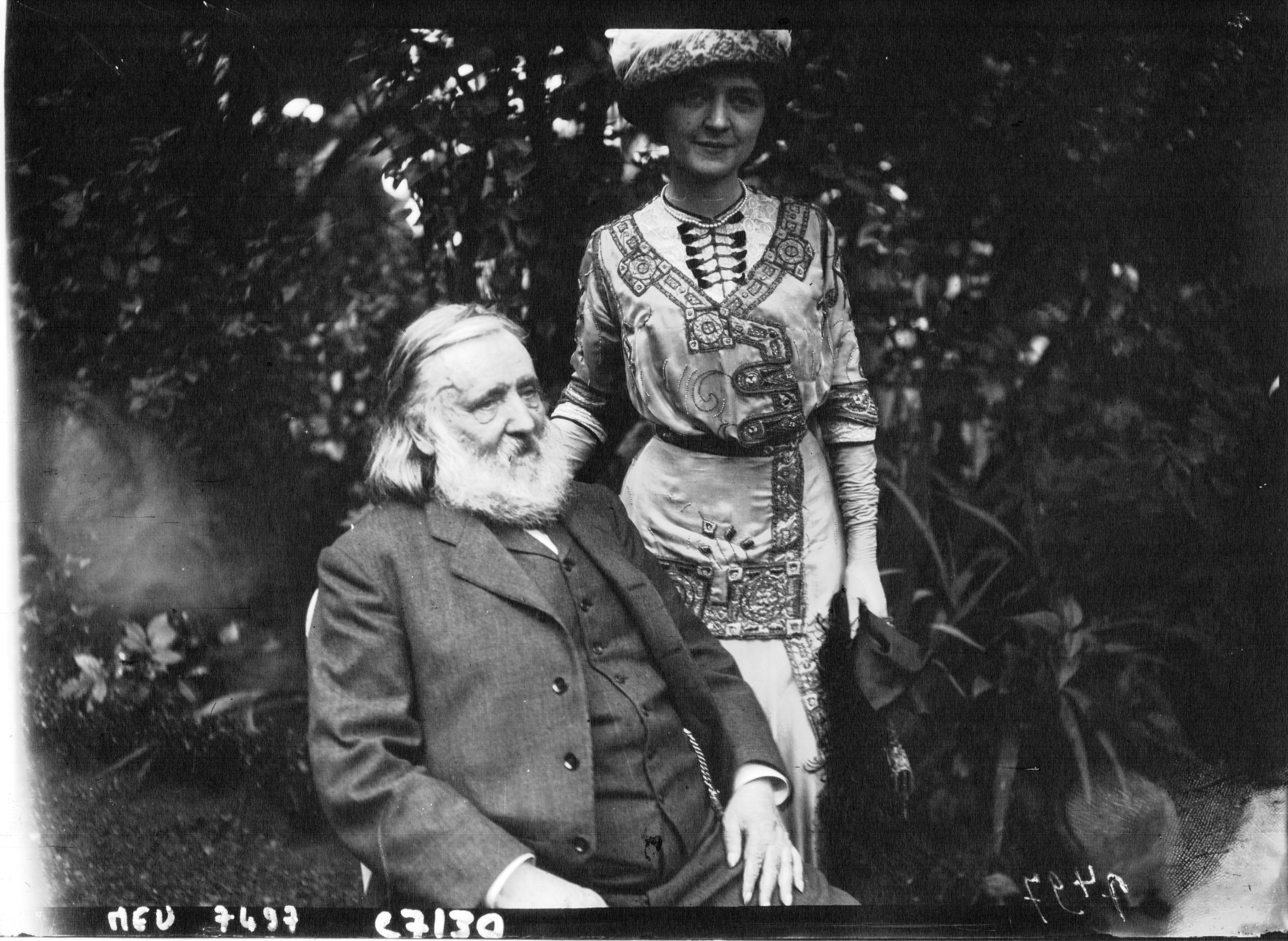
- Géniat with the politician Henry Maret.
- Born: 10 July 1881; St. Petersburg, Russian Empire
- Died: 27 September 1959 (aged 78); L'Haÿ-les-Roses, France
- Other name: Eugénie Pauline Martin
- Occupation: Actor
- Years active: 1909-1957 (film)

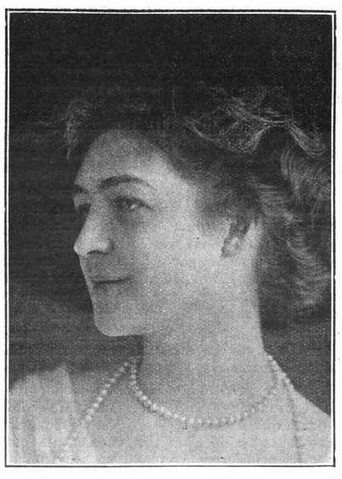
Marcelle Géniat, from a 1911 publication.

Marcelle Géniat (French: [maʁsɛl ʒenija]; 1881-1959) was a French film actress.

She was born Eugénie Pauline Martin in St. Petersburg, Russia, to French parents.

== Partial filmography ==
- Le retour du passé (1916)
- L'imprévu (1917) - Hélène Ravenel
- Serments (1931) - La baronne de Murnau
- La fusée (1933) - Marie Girbal
- Quelqu'un a tué... (1933)
- Le billet de mille (1935) - La rôdeuse
- Crime and Punishment (1935) - Madame Raskolnikov
- The Mysteries of Paris (1935) - La Chouette
- The Green Domino (1935) - Mme de Fallec
- La Garçonne (1936) - Tante Sylvestre
- They Were Five (1936) - La grand' mère
- La joueuse d'orgue (1936) - Véronique
- The Man of the Hour (1937) - Alphonsine Boulard - la mère d'Alfred
- La Glu (1938) - Marie des Anges
- The Strange Monsieur Victor (1938) - La mère de Victor
- Satan's Paradise (1938) - La marquise d'Amaral
- Crossroads (1938) - Mme. Pelletier
- The Rebel (1938) - La grand-mère
- L'étrange nuit de Noël (1939) - Madame Thibet
- Latin Quarter (1939) - (uncredited)
- The Path of Honour (1939) - Mme Imbert
- Fromont jeune et Risler aîné (1941) - Madame Delobelle
- The Chain Breaker (1941) - Mamouret
- The Blue Veil (1942) - Madame Breuilly
- Haut le vent (1942) - Tante Anna
- White Wings (1943) - Tante Louise
- The Wolf of the Malveneurs (1943) - Marianne
- Jeannou (1943) - Marceline
- The White Waltz (1943) - Nany
- Sowing the Wind (1944)
- Le merle blanc (1944) - Noémie
- The Last Metro (1945)
- Destiny (1946) - Mme Moretti
- The Village of Wrath (1947) - La grand-mère
- Les requins de Gibraltar (1947) - Tante Marguerite
- The Renegade (1948) - La sorcière, sa femme
- Une mort sans importance (1948) - Tante Agathe
- Night Round (1950) - La locataire du sixième
- La belle que voilà (1950) - Varbara Ostovska
- Blonde (1950) - La grand-mère
- God Needs Men (1950) - La mère Gourvennec
- The Man from Jamaica (1950) - Mme. Milleris
- The Passerby (1951) - Mme. Iturbe
- Trial at the Vatican (1952) - Soeur Saint-Pierre
- The Secret of the Mountain Lake (1952)
- The Girl with the Whip (1952) - Madame Pons
- Manon of the Spring (1952) - Baptistine, la Piémontaise
- The Unfrocked One (1954) - Madame Morand
- Sophie and the Crime (1955) - Mme Gretchikine
- Bonjour jeunesse (1957) - La grand-mère de Pietro (final film role)

== Bibliography ==
- Goble, Alan. The Complete Index to Literary Sources in Film. Walter de Gruyter, 1999.
