= Raoul André =

French director and screenwriter

Raoul André (24 May 1916 in Rabat (Morocco) - 4 November 1992) was a French director and screenwriter, He was married to actress Louise Carletti (December 1955), and he is the father of Ariane Carletti.

== Filmography ==
- The Village of Wrath (1947)
- Cab Number 13 (1948)
- The Killer is Listening (1948)
- Good Enough to Eat (1951)
- One Night in Megève (1953)
- Women Without Hope (1954)
- Vice Dolls (1954)
- The Babes Make the Law (1955)
- Look for the Woman (1955)
- A Splendid Girl (1955)
- The Indiscreet (1956)
- The Babes in the Secret Service (1956)
- Man and Child (1956)
- The Handcuffs Polka (1957)
- Clara and the Villains (1958)
- Secret professionnel (1959)
- La Planque (1961)
- Tartarin of Tarascon (1962)
- Jeff Gordon, Secret Agent (1963)
- Ladies First (1963)
- Ces dames s'en mêlent (1964)
- Mission to Caracas (1965)
- The Great Gadget (1967)
- Ces messieurs de la famille (1968)
- Le Bourgeois gentil mec (1969)
- Ces messieurs de la gâchette (1970)
- La dernière bourrée à Paris (1973)
- There's a Bone in the Mill (1974)
- The Sex Clinic (1974)
