= Lucien Aguettand =

French art director

- Born: 19 January 1901; Paris, France
- Died: 14 December 1989 (aged 88); Nogent-sur-Marne, France
- Other name: Lucien Aguettand-Blanc
- Occupation: Art director
- Years active: 1926–1970 (film)

Lucien Aguettand (19 January 1901 – 14 December 1989) was a French art director who designed the sets for over eighty films during his career.

== Selected filmography ==
- Little Devil May Care (1928)
- Checkmate (1931)
- All That's Not Worth Love (1931)
- The Wonderful Day (1932)
- Knock (1933)
- The Lady of Lebanon (1934)
- Arlette and Her Fathers (1934)
- The Crew (1935)
- Koenigsmark (1935)
- Tovaritch (1935)
- The Secrets of the Red Sea (1937)
- The Lady from Vittel (1937)
- White Cargo (1937)
- Captain Benoit (1938)
- Durand Jewellers (1938)
- Behind the Facade (1939)
- The Path of Honour (1939)
- Narcisse (1940)
- The Chain Breaker (1941)
- Portrait of Innocence (1941)
- Bolero (1942)
- At Your Command, Madame (1942)
- I Am with You (1943)
- White Wings (1943)
- Home Port (1943)
- First on the Rope (1944)
- The Lost Village (1947)
- The Murdered Model (1948)
- Brilliant Waltz (1949)
- Scandal on the Champs-Élysées (1949)
- Quay of Grenelle (1950)
- The Real Culprit (1951)
- The Secret of Helene Marimon (1954)
- Lord Rogue (1955)
- Blackmail (1955)
- House on the Waterfront (1955)
- The Wheel (1957)
- Rendezvous (1961)

== Bibliography ==
- Hayward, Susan. French Costume Drama of the 1950s: Fashioning Politics in Film. Intellect Books, 2010.
