= The Murderer Is Afraid at Night =

1942 film

The Murderer is Afraid at Night
- Directed by: Jean Delannoy
- Written by: Jean Delannoy; Roger Vitrac
- Based on: The Murderer is Afraid at Night by Pierre Véry
- Produced by: Wilfrid Baumgartner; André Paulvé
- Starring: Mireille Balin; Jean Chevrier; Louise Carletti
- Cinematography: Paul Cotteret
- Edited by: Louisette Hautecoeur
- Music by: Georges Auric
- Production company: DisCina
- Distributed by: Discina
- Release date: 2 September 1942
- Running time: 100 minutes
- Country: France
- Language: French

The Murderer is Afraid at Night (French: L'assassin a peur la nuit) is a 1942 French crime drama film directed by Jean Delannoy and starring Mireille Balin, Jean Chevrier and Louise Carletti. A film noir it was shot at the Victorine Studios in Nice in Vichy-controlled France. The film's sets were designed by the art director Georges Wakhévitch. It may have also acted as an allegory for Occupied France to look forward to a future when it is free after its Liberation.

== Synopsis ==
In the South of France Olivier a professional burglar is on the run after a job goes wrong. He takes shelter in the countryside after befriending a quarry worker and has a romantic encounter with his sister Monique. However his former lover the vampish Lola, who he has robbed to support her materialistic demands, tracks him down and threatens to shoot him. He ultimately surrenders to the police in the knowledge that once he has served a spell in prison he can look forward to a future with Monique in which he is truly free.

== Cast ==
- Mireille Balin as Lola Gracieuse
- Jean Chevrier as Olivier Rol
- Louise Carletti as Monique
- Henri Guisol as Bébé-Fakir
- Georges Lannes as Paluaud
- Pierrette Caillol as Émilienne
- Charlotte Clasis as Monique and Gilbert's grandmother
- Alexandre Fabry as Father Toine
- Lucien Callamand as the manager of the "Petit Brummel"
- Jacques Tarride as Joseph
- Roland Pégurier as young Pierrot
- Gilbert Gil as Gilbert
- Jules Berry as Jérôme
- Gisèle Alcée as Juliette

== Bibliography ==
- Walker-Morrison, Deborah. Classic French Noir: Gender and the Cinema of Fatal Desire. Bloomsbury Publishing, 2020.
