= Women Without Hope =

1954 film

- Directed by: Raoul André
- Written by: René Blancard; Raymond Caillava
- Produced by: Jean Lefait; Raymond Logeart
- Starring: Gisèle Pascal; Philippe Lemaire; Louise Carletti
- Cinematography: Roger Fellous
- Edited by: Gabriel Rongier
- Music by: Daniel Lesur
- Production company: Vascos Films
- Distributed by: Mondial Films
- Release date: 4 August 1954
- Running time: 88 minutes
- Country: France
- Language: French

Women Without Hope (French: Marchandes d'illusions) is a 1954 French crime drama film directed by Raoul André and starring Gisèle Pascal, Philippe Lemaire and Louise Carletti. It was shot at the Billancourt Studios in Paris. The film's sets were designed by the art director Louis Le Barbenchon. It is also known by the alternative title Nights of Shame.

== Synopsis ==
Two prostitutes are in love with men, a painter and his best friend, who do not know about their backgrounds. When a fellow prostitute is murdered, they remain silent for fear that testifying will reveal their real employment to their boyfriends.

== Cast ==
- Gisèle Pascal as Marie-Thérèse Langeac
- Philippe Lemaire as Pierre Larrieu
- Louise Carletti as Marcelle
- Raymond Pellegrin as René
- Nicole Courcel as Maria
- René Blancard as Le commissaire Denys
- Gina Manès as Mathilde Grigou
- Lisette Lebon as Sophie
- Paul Demange as Le marchand de couleurs
- René Havard as Le souteneur
- Jérôme Goulven as L'inspecteur Martial
- Simone Berthier as Monique
- Yette Lucas as La concierge
- Gaetan Panella as Mathilde Grigou
- Michel Ardan as Fernand Cortedani
- Bernard Musson as Le client endormi
- Yôko Tani as L'Eurasienne

== Bibliography ==
- Campbell, Russell. Marked Women: Prostitutes and Prostitution in the Cinema. University of Wisconsin Press, 2006.
- Rège, Philippe. Encyclopedia of French Film Directors, Volume 1. Scarecrow Press, 2009.
