= The Renegade (1948 film) =

1948 film

- Directed by: Jacques Séverac
- Written by: Paul Achard; Jacques Séverac
- Produced by: Jean A. Turenne
- Starring: Louise Carletti; Maurice Escande; Édouard Delmont
- Cinematography: Pierre Levent
- Edited by: Monique Lacombe
- Music by: Mohamed Iguerbouchène; Alain Romans; Richard Stauch
- Production companies: Athena Film; Les Films Monceau
- Distributed by: Les Films Constellation
- Release date: 9 April 1948
- Running time: 90 minutes
- Country: France
- Language: French

The Renegade (French: La renégate) is a 1948 French drama film directed by Jacques Séverac and starring Louise Carletti, Maurice Escande and Édouard Delmont. The film's sets were designed by the art director Maurice Bernard.

== Cast ==
- Louise Carletti as Conchita, la renégate
- Maurice Escande as Le caïd Tahmar
- Édouard Delmont as Tio Lopez
- Pierre Larquey as Ricardo
- Yves Vincent as Jean Costa
- Guy Rapp as Le trafiquant
- Marcelle Géniat as La sorcière, sa femme
- Valéry Inkijinoff as Moktar
- Habib Benglia as Youssef
- Marcel Pérès as Manuel
- Jacqueline Brasseur as Yasmina
- Robert Moncade as Sauval
- Nicolas Amato as Le docteur
- Jacques Henley as Le chef de la police
- Manuel Gary as Le capitaine
- Eugène Yvernès as Le juif

== Bibliography ==
- Bessy, Maurice & Chirat, Raymond. Histoire du cinéma français: encyclopédie des films, 1940–1950. Pygmalion, 1986
- Rège, Philippe. Encyclopedia of French Film Directors, Volume 1. Scarecrow Press, 2009.
