= Annette and the Blonde Woman =

1942 film

- Directed by: Jean Dréville
- Written by: Georges Simenon (novel); Henri Decoin; Michel Duran
- Produced by: Alfred Greven
- Starring: Louise Carletti; Henri Garat; Mona Goya
- Cinematography: Robert Lefebvre
- Edited by: Charlotte Guilbert
- Music by: René Sylviano
- Production company: Continental Films
- Distributed by: Films Sonores Tobis
- Release date: 16 March 1942
- Running time: 85 minutes
- Country: France
- Language: French

Annette and the Blonde Woman (French: Annette et la dame blonde) is a 1942 French comedy film directed by Jean Dréville and starring Louise Carletti, Henri Garat and Mona Goya. The German-controlled Continental Films in occupied Paris made it.

== Cast ==
- Louise Carletti as Annette
- Henri Garat as Maurice
- Mona Goya as Myriam
- Georges Rollin as Bernard
- Marcelle Rexiane as Madame Barnavon
- Georges Chamarat as Monsieur Barnavon
- Rosine Luguet as Gigi
- Simone Valère as Lucette
- Raymonde La Fontan as Marie-Louise
- Albert Broquin as Le clochard
- Henry Darbray as Le juge d'instruction
- Paul Faivre as Le maire
- Eugène Frouhins
- Henry Gerrar as Le concierge du Trianon
- Georges Gosset
- Albert Malbert as Le gardien de prison
- Pierre Palau as Le photographe
- Robert Rollis as Le groom
- Eugène Yvernès as L'agent du commissariat

== Bibliography ==
- Moeller, Felix. The Film Minister: Goebbels and the Cinema in the Third Reich. Edition Axel Menges, 2000.
