= Narcisse (film) =

1940 film

- Directed by: Ayres d'Aguiar
- Written by: Anthony Kimmins; André Gillois; Karel Lamac
- Produced by: Ayres d'Aguiar
- Starring: Rellys; Paul Azaïs; Monique Rolland
- Cinematography: Victor Arménise; Paul Cotteret; Robert Juillard
- Edited by: André Versein
- Music by: René Sylviano
- Production company: Gray-Film
- Distributed by: Cocinor
- Release date: 27 March 1940
- Running time: 95 minutes
- Country: France
- Language: French

Narcisse is a 1940 French comedy film directed by Ayres d'Aguiar and starring Rellys, Paul Azaïs and Monique Rolland. It was shot at the Billancourt Studios in Paris and the Saint-Laurent-du-Var Studios in Nice. The film's sets were designed by the art director Lucien Aguettand. It is a remake of the 1938 British film It's in the Air directed by Anthony Kimmins and re-used footage from the earlier film. It was produced during the Phoney War period and was released in March 1940, a few weeks before the beginning of the Battle of France.

== Synopsis ==
Narcisse Pigeon hopes to join the French Air Force, but fails the selection board. One day, at a friend's house, he tries on his uniform and discovering an overlooked urgent message in the pocket, he goes to deliver it to the base. He is mistaken for a serving airmen and quickly falls foul of the sergeant major, while also falling in love with the attractive canteen girl Rosine. He then accidentally ends up flying a new prototype plane, inadvertently performing a series of acrobatic manoeuvres in the air, before somehow managing to land it again.

== Cast ==
- Rellys as Narcisse Pigeon
- Paul Azaïs as Crépin
- Monique Rolland as Rosine
- Claude May as Josette
- André Gabriello as Le sergent-major
- Jeanne Fusier-Gir as La tante
- Georges Lannes as Le commandant
- Henri Crémieux as L'inspecteur général
- Jean Joffre as L'oncle
- Roger Legris as Lafolle
- Georges Grey as Robert
- Robert Ozanne as Le lieutenant
- Georges Péclet as Le pilote

== Bibliography ==
- Bessy, Maurice & Chirat, Raymond. Histoire du cinéma français: encyclopédie des films, 1935–1939. Pygmalion, 1986
- Crisp, Colin. Genre, Myth and Convention in the French Cinema, 1929-1939. Indiana University Press, 2002.
- Rège, Philippe. Encyclopedia of French Film Directors, Volume 1. Scarecrow Press, 2009.
