= The Village of Wrath =

1947 French film by Raoul André

- Directed by: Raoul André
- Written by: Raoul André; Jean Canolle
- Produced by: André Hugon
- Starring: Louise Carletti; Paul Cambo; Micheline Francey
- Cinematography: Raymond Agnel
- Music by: Django Reinhardt
- Production company: Films André Hugon
- Distributed by: Cinéma de France
- Release date: 7 May 1947
- Running time: 105 minutes
- Country: France
- Language: French

The Village of Wrath (French: Le village de la colère) is a 1947 French drama film directed by Raoul André and starring Louise Carletti, Paul Cambo and Micheline Francey. The film's sets were designed by the art directors Louis Le Barbenchon and Raymond Nègre.

== Synopsis ==
The inhabitants of a small village loathe a young woman who lives there who they consider to be a witch. A young stranger arrives in the area and he falls in love with the woman, to the disgust of the villagers who eventually drive them out.

== Cast ==
- Louise Carletti as Marie de St-Aiguif
- Paul Cambo as Bencho
- Micheline Francey as Laurette
- Marcelle Géniat as La grand-mère
- Raymond Cordy as Richelieu
- Pierre Duncan as Un frère Archangias
- René Klein as Un frère Archangias
- Marcel Lupovici as Jacques Le Majeur
- Roger Monteaux as Le curé
- Jean Parédès as Mascaret
- Léon Pauléon as Un frère Archangias
- Nicole Riche as Anna
- Maurice Schutz as Anne

== Bibliography ==
- Martin, Yves. Le cinéma français, 1946-1966: un jeune homme au fil des vagues. Editions Méréal, 1998.
- Palmer, Tim. Tales of the Underworld: Jean-Pierre Melville and the 1950s French Cinema. University of Wisconsin, 2003.
