= Good Enough to Eat =

- Directed by: Raoul André
- Written by: Raoul André; Francis Blanche
- Produced by: Edmond Ténoudji
- Starring: Gaby Morlay; Louise Carletti; Serge Reggiani
- Cinematography: Raymond Agnel; André Germain
- Edited by: Gabriel Rongier
- Music by: René Challan; Henri Leca
- Production company: Les Films Marceau
- Distributed by: Les Films Marceau
- Release date: 8 June 1951
- Running time: 83 minutes
- Country: France
- Language: French

Good Enough to Eat (French: Une fille à croquer) is a 1951 French comedy film directed by Raoul André and starring Gaby Morlay, Louise Carletti and Serge Reggiani. It draws inspiration from the story of Red Riding Hood.

The film's sets were designed by the art director Maurice Colasson. It was partly shot on location around Yvelines.

== Main cast ==
- Gaby Morlay as Madame de Mergrand / Mathilde Chaperon
- Louise Carletti as Rose Chaperon
- Serge Reggiani as Jean-Louis dit Loup
- Francis Blanche as Gilles
- Pierre Dac as Pantois
- Jérôme Goulven as Le brigadier / Charles Perrault
- Charles Dechamps as Hughes
- Paul Demange as Le patron de l'auberge de l'Hermitière
- Roger Legris as Félix
- Jacques Hilling as Pou - le frère de Madame de Mergrand
- Adrienne Gallon as Céline
- Louis Blanche as Maître Ruban
- Edith Fontaine as Annette
- Maurice Schutz as Grand-père Luc

== Bibliography ==
- Jack Zipes. The Enchanted Screen: The Unknown History of Fairy-Tale Films. Routledge, 2011.
