= Jacques Duby =

French actor

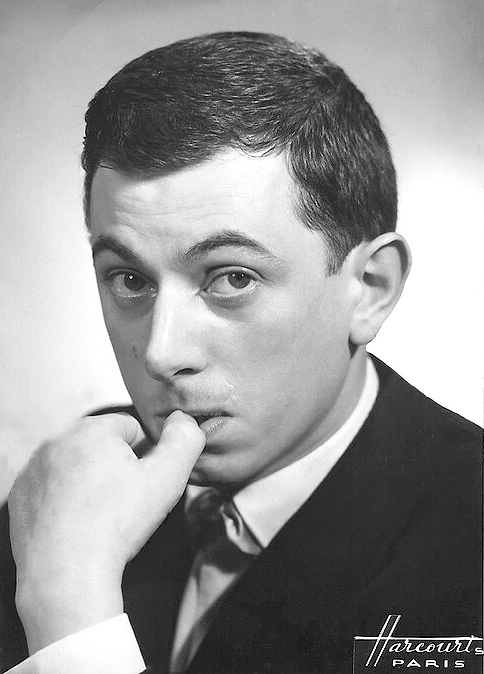
- Photo of Jacques Duby
- Born: 7 May 1922; Toulouse, France
- Died: 15 February 2012 (aged 89); Paris, France
- Occupation: Actor

Jacques Duby (7 May 1922 – 15 February 2012) was a French stage, film and television actor. He was born in Toulouse.

== Jacques Duby as narrator ==
Some of his works include 101 Dalmatians (1961), Pinocchio (1968), and The Jungle Book (1967). He also served as narrator in a French audiobook recording of Treasure Island released in 2011.

== Selected filmography ==
- Stopover in Orly (1955)
- It Happened in Aden (1956)
- Meeting in Paris (1956)
- Short Head (1956)
- Women's Prison (1958)
- Les Novices (1970)
- Piaf (1974)
