= The Messenger (1937 film) =

1937 film

- Directed by: Raymond Rouleau
- Written by: Marcel Achard; Henri Bernstein (play)
- Produced by: Alexandre Kamenka
- Starring: Gaby Morlay; Jean Gabin; Mona Goya
- Cinematography: Jules Kruger
- Edited by: Maurice Serein
- Music by: Georges Auric
- Production company: Films Albatros
- Distributed by: Pathé Consortium Cinéma
- Release date: 2 September 1937
- Running time: 98 minutes
- Country: France
- Language: French

The Messenger (French: Le messager, or also known as Messenger Boy) is a 1937 French drama film directed by Raymond Rouleau and starring Gaby Morlay, Jean Gabin and Mona Goya. It was based on a play by Henri Bernstein. Morlay reprised her role while Victor Francen, who had played the male lead on stage, was replaced by Gabin.

It was shot at the Joinville Studios in Paris and the Victorine Studios in Nice. The film's art direction was by Eugène Lourié.

== Synopsis ==
After leaving his socialite wife to marry her secretary, Nick Dange finds his well-connected wife has arranged for him to be made unemployable in Paris. The only work that he is able to get is to manage a mine in Uganda.

He feels lonely and isolated, thousands of miles from his wife. His only companion is a fellow worker named Jack. When Jack returns to Paris after being injured, Nick asks him to take a message to his wife.

Yet she is also lonely and begins an affair with Jack, who has already come to idolize her from the descriptions that Nick had made back in Africa. Yet when Nick returns to Paris and discovers the illicit relationship, Jack commits suicide.

== Cast ==
- Gaby Morlay as Marie
- Jean Gabin as Nick Dange
- Mona Goya as Pierrette
- Jean-Pierre Aumont as Gilbert Rollin
- Maurice Escande as Géo
- Henri Guisol as Jack
- Pierre Alcover as Morel
- Ernest Ferny as L'industriel
- Betty Rowe as Florence
- Princesse Kandou as Dolly
- Bernard Blier as Le chauffeur de Nick
- Lucien Coëdel as L'agent
- René Stern as Le notaire
- Jean Témerson as Le maître d'hôtel
- Robert Vattier as Le représentant

== Bibliography ==
- Kennedy-Karpat, Colleen. Rogues, Romance, and Exoticism in French Cinema of the 1930s. Fairleigh Dickinson, 2013.
