= Mona Goya =

French actress (1909–1961)

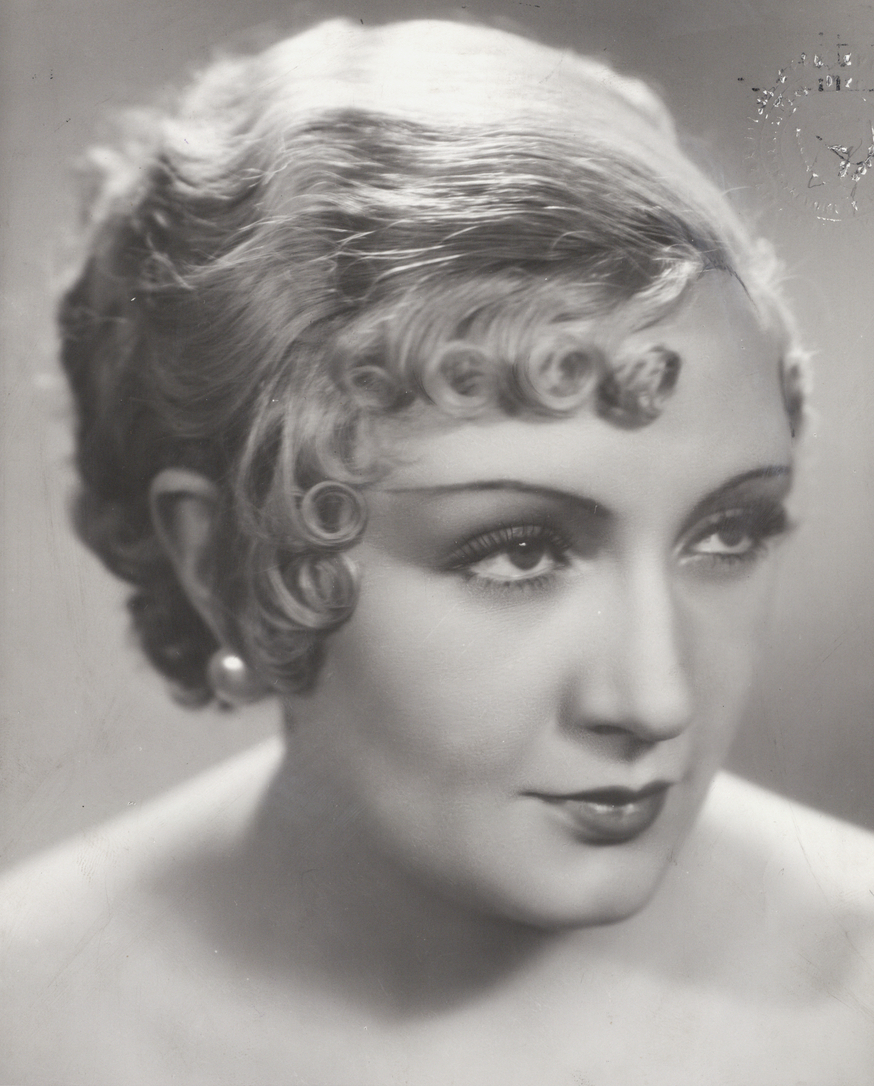
- Born: 25 November 1909; Mexico City, Mexico
- Died: 8 October 1961 (aged 51); Clinchy-la-Garenne; France
- Other name: Simone Isabelle Marchand
- Occupation: Film actor
- Years active: 1928–1960

Mona Goya (25 November 1909 – 8 October 1961) was a Mexican-born French film actress who rose to fame in the 1930s.

== Selected filmography ==
- Madame Récamier (1928)
- Princess Mandane (1928) – Simoun
- L'Argent (1928)
- Jim Hackett Champion (1928)
- Rayon de soleil (1929)
- The Lady from the Sea (1929) – Claire le Grange
- Hai-Tang (1930) – (French Version)
- The Flame of Love (1930) – Yvette
- Not So Quiet on the Western Front (1930) – Fifi
- The Price of Things (1930) – Natasha Boleska
- Chérie (1930) – Olivia Dangerfield
- Soyons gais (1930) – Diane
- Road to Dishonour (1930)
- Révolte dans la prison (1931) – Anna Harvey
- Jenny Lind (1931) – Selma
- Hardi les gars (1931) – Yvette
- La bande à Bouboule (1931) – Émilienne
- Buster se marie (1931)
- Amour et discipline (1931) – Juliette Giroudet
- Quand on est belle (1932) – Peg
- Coiffeur pour dames (1932) – Aline
- The Wonderful Day (1932) – La jeune femme
- Buridan's Donkey (1932) – Micheline
- The Bread Peddler (1934) – Mary
- Nemo's Bank (1934) – Charlotte
- Mam'zelle Spahi (1934) – Une femme au bal (uncredited)
- Un tour de cochon (1934)
- Trois cents à l'heure (1934) – La comtesse de Portebault
- Les époux célibataires (1935) – Fleurette Legrand
- Jonny, haute-couture (1935) – Liliane
- Light Cavalry (1935) – Rosika
- Juggernaut (1936) – Yvonne Clifford
- Josette (1937) – La chanteuse Viviane Eros
- Francis the First (1937) – Elsa / Madeleine Ferron
- Clothes and the Woman (1937) – Cecilie
- The Messenger (1937) – Pierrette
- Les femmes collantes (1938) – Rose
- Ernest the Rebel (1938) – Suzanne
- I Was an Adventuress (1938) – Une jeune femme
- Feux de joie (1939) – Lola
- Vous seule que j'aime (1939) – Cecil Jackett, Américaine
- This Man in Paris (1939) – Torch Bernal
- Whirlwind of Paris (1939) – Marie-Claude
- Annette and the Blonde Woman (1942) – Myriam Morisson
- No Love Allowed (1942) – Lucette de Saint-Églefin
- Captain Fracasse (1943) – La marquise des Bruyères / La marchesa di Bruyeres
- The Man Who Sold His Soul (1943) – Colette
- Mon amour est près de toi (1943) – Odette
- My Last Mistress (1943) – Gilda
- La Malibran (1944) – Madame Garcia
- Vingt-quatre heures de perm (1945) – Huguette Landier
- L'extravagante mission (1945) – Théodora Bareski
- Not So Stupid (1946) – Gaby Moreuil
- Mandrin (1947) – Madame de Pompadour
- White as Snow (1948) – Suzy Rexy
- Impeccable Henri (1948) – Elvire
- My Aunt from Honfleur (1949)
- Forbidden to the Public (1949) – Nicole Guise
- Wedding Night (1950) – Valentine
- Les maîtres-nageurs (1951)
- The Lovers of Bras-Mort (1951) – La veuve Girard
- Gigolo (1951) – Henriette
- Never Two Without Three (1951) – Rita Malaquais
- His Father's Portrait (1953) – La mère de Domino / Mother
- Meeting in Paris (1956) – Mme. Payette
- La Famille Anodin (1956-1957, TV Series) – Tante Léa
- Springtime in Paris (1957)
- Le désert de Pigalle (1958) – Delmine
- Miss Pigalle (1958)
- Les amants de demain (1959) – La cliente de la pension Les Géraniums
- Babette Goes to War (1959) – Mme Fernande
- The Old Guard (1960) – Catherine
