= The Babes Make the Law =

1955 film

- Directed by: Raoul André
- Written by: Raymond Caillava; Pierre Véry
- Produced by: Emile Darbel; Maggie Gillet; Pierre Gillet
- Starring: Claudine Dupuis; Dominique Wilms Louise Carletti Michèle Philippe
- Cinematography: Georges Delaunay
- Edited by: Jeanne Rongier
- Music by: Daniel White
- Production companies: Eole Production; Jeannic Films
- Distributed by: Jeannic Films
- Release date: 15 February 1955
- Running time: 95 minutes
- Country: France
- Language: French

The Babes Make the Law (French: Les pépées font la loi) is a 1955 French comedy film directed by Raoul André and starring Claudine Dupuis, Dominique Wilms, Louise Carletti and Michèle Philippe. It was shot at the Billancourt Studios in Paris. The film's sets were designed by the art director Louis Le Barbenchon. It was followed by sequel The Babes in the Secret Service in 1956.

== Synopsis ==
When Nathalie is kidnapped, her mother Flora doesn't want to get the police involved. Instead she organises her three other daughters to take the law into their own hands and confront the gang behind it.

== Cast ==
- Claudine Dupuis as Elvire, daughter of Flora
- Dominique Wilms as Elisabeth, other daughter of Flora
- Louise Carletti as Christine, other daughter of Flora
- Michèle Philippe as Nathalie, daughter of kidnapped Flora
- Suzy Prim as Flora, the mother
- Jean Gaven as Frédéric Langlet, husband of Christine
- Laurent Dauthuille as Bob, the baby snatcher
- Louis de Funès as Jeannot la Bonne Affaire, barman of "Lotus"
- Jean-Jacques Delbo as Rouge, the gangster who beats Nathalie
- André Roanne as Mr Charles - "the Professor"
- René Havard as Calamart, the wrong employee
- Olivier Mathot as Robert, husband of Elizabeth
- Paul Péri as Casanova, the head kidnapper
- Paul Demange as vacuum bag collector
- Paul Dupuis as Masson, husband of Elvire
- Jacqueline Noëlle as the brunette in the café
- Simone Berthier as Hortense
- Jérôme Goulven as Alphonse - le notaire
- Jacques Muller as lawyer's client
- Yôko Tani as fleuriste du Lotus
- Don Ziegler as the Scotsman

== Bibliography ==
- Prime, Rebecca. Hollywood Exiles in Europe: The Blacklist and Cold War Film Culture. Rutgers University Press, 2014.
- Vincendeau, Ginette . Stars and Stardom in French Cinema. Bloomsbury Publishing, 2000.
