= Women's Prison (1958 film) =

1958 film

- Directed by: Maurice Cloche
- Written by: Francis Carco; Maurice Cloche; André Tabet
- Based on: Women's Prison by Francis Carco
- Produced by: Robert de Nesle
- Starring: Danièle Delorme; Jacques Duby; Vega Vinci
- Cinematography: Jacques Mercanton
- Edited by: Fanchette Mazin
- Music by: René Sylviano
- Production company: Comptoir Français de Production Cinématographique
- Distributed by: Comptoir Français de Production Cinématographique
- Release date: 16 July 1958
- Running time: 100 minutes
- Country: France
- Language: French

Women's Prison (French: Prisons de femmes) is a 1958 French crime film directed by Maurice Cloche and starring Danièle Delorme, Jacques Duby and Vega Vinci. It is based on the 1930 novel of the same title by Francis Carco previously made into the 1938 French film Women's Prison and the 1947 Swedish film Two Women.

The film's sets were designed by the art director Robert Giordani and Jean Mandaroux.

== Cast ==
- Danièle Delorme as Alice Rémon ou Dumas
- Jacques Duby as René
- Vega Vinci as Gigi
- Jane Marken as Mme Rémon, la belle-mère d'Alice
- Mireille Perrey as Mme Vertin - la mère de René
- Gabriel Cattand as L'avocat
- Germaine Kerjean as La directrice
- Louis Arbessier as Le directeur de la prison
- Joëlle Bernard as Une détenue
- George Cusin as Le juge d'instruction
- Dominique Davray as Une collègue d'Alice
- Jacques Dynam as Le médecin
- Michel Etcheverry as Le substitut
- Henri-Jacques Huet as Mario
- Nicolas Amato as Un journaliste
- Georges Lycan as Le docteur de la prison
- Raymone as Une vieille détenue
- Jackie Sardou as Lulu

== Bibliography ==
- Goble, Alan. The Complete Index to Literary Sources in Film. Walter de Gruyter, 1999.
