= Paul Cotteret =

French cinematographer

- Born: 2 April 1896; Aubervilliers, France
- Died: 9 November 1998 (aged 102); Antibes, France
- Occupation: Cinematographer
- Years active: 1924-1962 (film)

Paul Cotteret (1896–1998) was a French cinematographer.

== Selected filmography ==
- Siren of the Tropics (1927)
- André Cornélis (1927)
- Wine Cellars (1930)
- The Polish Jew (1931)
- Tossing Ship (1932)
- Our Lord's Vineyard (1932)
- Love and Luck (1932)
- The Lacquered Box (1932)
- Mannequins (1933)
- Three Sailors (1934)
- The Brighton Twins (1936)
- The Woman from the End of the World (1938)
- The Porter from Maxim's (1939)
- His Uncle from Normandy (1939)
- Narcisse (1940)
- The Murderer is Afraid at Night (1942)
- Private Life (1942)
- Fever (1942)
- The Inevitable Monsieur Dubois (1943)
- Mistral (1943)
- Vautrin (1943)
- The Lucky Star (1943)
- A Cage of Nightingales (1945)
- Fantômas (1946)
- Star Without Light (1946)
- The Faceless Enemy (1946)
- The Idol (1948)
- The Wolf (1949)
- Cartouche, King of Paris (1950)
- One Only Loves Once (1950)
- The Passage of Venus (1951)
- Thirteen at the Table (1955)
- Mannequins of Paris (1956)

== Bibliography ==
- Alpi, Deborah Lazaroff. Robert Siodmak: A Biography, with Critical Analyses of His Films Noirs and a Filmography of All His Works. McFarland, 1998.
