= Paul Demange (actor) =

French actor (1901–1983)

- Born: Paul Marie Hubert Petitdemenge; 12 April 1901; France
- Died: 28 November 1983 (aged 82)
- Occupation: Actor
- Years active: 1933–1977

Paul Demange (French pronunciation: [pɔl dəmɑ̃ʒ]; 12 April 1901 – 28 November 1983) was a French actor who had roles in over 200 films from 1933 to 1977.

A familiar face in French cinema, Demange was a character actor who generally appeared in brief supporting roles. He specialized in quirky characters, including homosexuals.

== Selected filmography ==
- Bach the Detective (1936)
- Marinella (1936)
- The Lover of Madame Vidal (1936)
- Excursion Train (1936)
- The Flame (1936)
- The Man of the Hour (1937)
- Three Waltzes (1938)
- Clodoche (1938)
- The City of Lights (1938)
- A Foolish Maiden (1938)
- His Uncle from Normandy (1939)
- Deputy Eusèbe (1939)
- Whirlwind of Paris (1939)
- Threats (1940)
- The Last of the Six (1941)
- The Master Valet (1941)
- The Black Diamond (1941)
- Mademoiselle Swing (1942)
- The Guardian Angel (1942)
- The Woman I Loved Most (1942)
- Malaria (1943)
- Lucrèce (1943)
- The Woman Who Dared (1944)
- St. Val's Mystery (1945)
- The Last Metro (1945)
- Pamela (1945)
- The Black Cavalier (1945)
- Back Streets of Paris (1946)
- Her Final Role (1946)
- Jericho (1946)
- Roger la Honte (1946)
- Women's Games (1946)
- Destiny (1946)
- Sylvie and the Ghost (1946)
- Man About Town (1947)
- Cab Number 13 (1948)
- City of Hope (1948)
- The Cupboard Was Bare (1948)
- Clochemerle (1948)
- Dilemma of Two Angels (1948)
- Night Express (1948)
- Doctor Laennec (1949)
- Millionaires for One Day (1949)
- The Red Angel (1949)
- The Treasure of Cantenac (1950)
- Prelude to Glory (1950)
- Death Threat (1950)
- Sending of Flowers (1950)
- Andalusia (1951)
- The Passage of Venus (1951)
- My Wife Is Formidable (1951)
- Good Enough to Eat (1951)
- The Road to Damascus (1952)
- Love Is Not a Sin (1952)
- This Age Without Pity (1952)
- Love in the Vineyard (1952)
- Her Last Christmas (1952)
- My Husband Is Marvelous (1952)
- The Sparrows of Paris (1953)
- The Lottery of Happiness (1953)
- Boum sur Paris (1953)
- My Brother from Senegal (1953)
- The Fighting Drummer (1953)
- Little Jacques (1953)
- Darling Anatole (1954)
- Crime at the Concert Mayol (1954)
- Women Without Hope (1954)
- Leguignon the Healer (1954)
- Quay of Blondes (1954)
- Madame du Barry (1954)
- Thirteen at the Table (1955)
- The Hotshot (1955)
- The Babes Make the Law (1955)
- Meeting in Paris (1956)
- If Paris Were Told to Us (1956)
- The Adventures of Gil Blas (1956)
- The Babes in the Secret Service (1956)
- It's All Adam's Fault (1958)
- Head Against the Wall (1959)
- The Seven Deadly Sins (1962)
- Arsène Lupin Versus Arsène Lupin (1962)
- When the Pheasants Pass (1965)
- The Duke's Gold (1965)
