= Mademoiselle Béatrice =

1943 film

- Directed by: Max de Vaucorbeil
- Written by: Roger Ferdinand; Max de Vaucorbeil
- Produced by: Roger Sallard
- Starring: Gaby Morlay; André Luguet; Louise Carletti
- Cinematography: René Gaveau
- Edited by: Raymond Lamy
- Music by: Georges Van Parys
- Production company: Gaumont
- Distributed by: Gaumont
- Release date: 19 May 1943
- Running time: 93 minutes
- Country: France
- Language: French

Mademoiselle Béatrice is a 1943 French comedy film directed by Max de Vaucorbeil and starring Gaby Morlay, André Luguet and Louise Carletti. The film's sets were designed by the art director Raymond Druart.

== Synopsis ==
A student in Paris is in love with Jeanette, but her family seem to present an obstacle to marriage. Fortunately Aunt Béatrice steps in to assist and all eventually turns out happily.

== Cast ==
- Gaby Morlay as Béatrice
- André Luguet as Hubert de Sainte-Croix
- Louise Carletti as Jeanette
- Jacques Baumer as Maître Bergas
- Germaine Charley as Madame de Malempré
- Marguerite Deval as La vieille dame du banc
- Louis Salou as Maurin-Gautier
- Jean Périer as Le vieux monsieur du banc
- Sinoël as Dagobert
- Gabrielle Fontan as Angèle
- Noëlle Norman as Virginie de Malempré
- Génia Vaury as Madame Philippon
- Jimmy Gaillard as Christian Bergas
- Pierre Bertin as Archange

== Bibliography ==
- Bertin-Maghit, Jean Pierre. Le cinéma français sous Vichy: les films français de 1940 à 1944. Revue du Cinéma Albatros, 1980.
- Rège, Philippe. Encyclopedia of French Film Directors, Volume 1. Scarecrow Press, 2009.
