= Monsieur Grégoire Escapes =

1946 film

- Directed by: Jacques Daniel-Norman
- Written by: Jacques Daniel-Norman
- Produced by: Lucien Viard
- Starring: Bernard Blier; Yvette Lebon; Jules Berry
- Cinematography: Nikolai Toporkoff
- Edited by: Marity Cléris
- Music by: Jean Yatove
- Production company: Bervia Films
- Distributed by: Société Nouvelle des Films Dispa
- Release date: 20 November 1946
- Running time: 100 minutes
- Country: France
- Language: French

Monsieur Grégoire Escapes (French: Monsieur Grégoire s'évade) is a 1946 French comedy film directed by Jacques Daniel-Norman and starring Bernard Blier, Yvette Lebon and Jules Berry. It was shot at the Buttes-Chaumont Studios in Paris. The film's sets were designed by the art director Robert Hubert.

== Synopsis ==
Insurance clerk Alex Grégoire lives a quite existence with his wife Angèle, his great passion in life being crossword puzzles. After he wins a crossword competition, he is propelled into a series of adventures involving a celebrated jewel thief.

== Cast ==
- Bernard Blier as Alex Grégoire
- Yvette Lebon as Angèle Grégoire
- Jules Berry as Charles Tuffal
- Aimé Clariond as M. Berny
- Georges Grey as Albert Rochot
- Gaby André as Colette
- Georges Gosset as Albert Rochot
- Julien Maffre as Milo Manche Vide
- Marcel Pérès as Chauvignot, l'aîné
- Gustave Gallet as M. Croche
- Pierre Labry as L'aubergiste
- Paul Faivre as Le protecteur de Bella Mey
- Lily Fayol as Bella-May
- Joe Alex as Jeff, le domestique de couleur de Tuffal
- Suzy Willy as Mme Boudu, la concierge
- Claude Magnier as Claude
- Lina Roxa as La bonne de Berny
- Elisa Ruis as Lina d'Arribal
- Alexandre Rignault as Paulo, le lutteur
- Roland Avellis as Julot
- Pierre Moncorbier as Un policier

== Bibliography ==
- Bessy, Maurice & Chirat, Raymond. Histoire du cinéma français: encyclopédie des films, 1940–1950. Pygmalion, 1986
- Rège, Philippe. Encyclopedia of French Film Directors, Volume 1. Scarecrow Press, 2009.
