= Patricia (film) =

1942 film

- Directed by: Paul Mesnier
- Written by: Pierre Heuzé; Paul Mesnier
- Produced by: Camille Trachimel
- Starring: Gabrielle Dorziat; Louise Carletti; Georges Grey
- Cinematography: Georges Clerc
- Music by: Roger Roger
- Production company: Société de Production et d'Edition Cinématographique
- Distributed by: Les Films Vog
- Release date: 27 October 1942
- Running time: 90 minutes
- Country: France
- Language: French

Patricia is a 1942 French comedy film directed by Paul Mesnier and starring Gabrielle Dorziat, Louise Carletti and Georges Grey. The film's sets were designed by the art director Roland Quignon. Despite being shot on a limited budget it was one of the most popular films during the Occupation of France. It was closely aligned with Vichy policy in its portrayal of female characters from two different generations taking part in the forging of a new France.

== Cast ==
- Gabrielle Dorziat as Mademoiselle Pressac - Tante Laurie
- Louise Carletti as Patricia
- Maï Bill as Chantal
- Georges Grey as Dominique
- Hubert de Malet as Jean
- Jean Servais as Fabien
- André Alerme as Le curé
- René Génin as Jouset
- Maurice Escande as André Vernon
- Aimé Clariond as Jacques Pressac
- Bernard Daydé as François

== Bibliography ==
- Burch, Noël & Sellier, Geneviève. The Battle of the Sexes in French Cinema, 1930–1956. Duke University Press, 2013.
