= Crime and Punishment (1956 film) =

- Directed by: Georges Lampin
- Screenplay by: Charles Spaak (scenario et dialogues de)
- Based on: Crime and Punishment; 1866 novel by Fyodor Dostoevsky
- Produced by: Jules Borkon
- Starring: Jean Gabin; Marina Vlady; Ulla Jacobsson; Bernard Blier; Robert Hossein
- Cinematography: Claude Renoir
- Edited by: Emma Le Chanois
- Music by: Maurice Thiriet
- Color process: Black and white
- Production company: Champs-Élysées Productions
- Distributed by: Pathé Consortium Cinéma
- Release date: 4 December 1956
- Running time: 108 minutes
- Country: France
- Language: French
- Box office: 1 782 212 admissions (France)

Crime and Punishment (French: Crime et Châtiment) is a 1956 French crime film based on the eponymous 1866 novel by Fyodor Dostoyevsky.

== Plot ==
Proud of his position in society and of his intelligence, René Brunel believes that bourgeois notions of morality do no apply to him. To prove his point he murders an old woman in cold blood.

== Cast ==
- Jean Gabin as Le commissaire Gallet
- Marina Vlady as Lili Marcellin
- Ulla Jacobsson as Nicole Brunel
- Bernard Blier as Antoine Monestier
- Robert Hossein as René Brunel
- Gaby Morlay as Madame Brunel (as Madame Gaby Morlay)
- René Havard as L'inspecteur Noblet
- Yvette Etiévant as Madame Marcelini (as Yvette Etievant)
- Gabrielle Fontan as Madame Harvais
- Roland Lesaffre as L'ouvrier accusé
- Albert Rémy as L'inspecteur Renaud
- Lino Ventura as Gustave Messonnier
- Gérard Blain as Jean Fargeot
- Julien Carette as Pierre Marcellin
