= Cab Number 13 =

1948 film

- Film poster
- Directed by: Mario Mattoli; Raoul André
- Written by: Xavier de Montépin; André Hugon; Jacques Rastier
- Starring: Vera Carmi; Ginette Leclerc; Sandro Ruffini
- Cinematography: Raymond Agnel; Jan Stallich
- Edited by: Jeanne Rongier; Fernando Tropea
- Music by: Renzo Rossellini
- Production companies: Excelsa Film; Cinématographie de France; Hugon-Films; Minerva Film
- Distributed by: Minerva Film
- Release date: 28 February 1948
- Running time: 90 minutes
- Countries: Italy; France
- Languages: Italian; French

Cab Number 13 (French: Le Dernier Fiacre, Italian: Il fiacre n. 13) is a 1948 French-Italian historical crime melodrama film directed by Mario Mattoli and starring Vera Carmi, Ginette Leclerc and Sandro Ruffini.

== Cast ==
- Vera Carmi as Jeanne Herblet (segments "Delitto" & "Castigo")
- Ginette Leclerc as Claudia (segments "Delitto" & "Castigo")
- Sandro Ruffini as Pietro Thefar (segments "Delitto" & "Castigo")
- Marcel Herrand as Georges de la Tour Vaudieu (segments "Delitto" & "Castigo")
- Leonardo Cortese as Andrea (segments "Delitto" & "Castigo")
- Vira Silenti as Mathilde
- Flavia Grande as Olivia
- Pierre Larquey as Pierre Loriot, il cocchiere (segments "Delitto" & "Castigo")
- Raymond Bussières as Jean Jeudi (segments "Delitto" & "Castigo")
- Achille Millo as Louis
- Patrizia Muriel as Berthe Marois
- Achille Majeroni as Le professeur Charcot
- Paul Demange as Plume d'Oie
- Galeazzo Benti as Le commissaire Portier
- Henri Nassiet as Le duc de la Tour Vaudieu (segments "Delitto" & "Castigo")
- Roldano Lupi as L'amant de Claudia (segments "Delitto" & "Castigo")

== See also ==
- Cab No. 13 (1926)
