= Louis Le Barbenchon =

French art director (1911–1980)

- Born: 23 February 1911; Paris, France
- Died: 1 September 1980 (aged 69); Beauvais, France
- Occupation: Art Director
- Years active: 1939–1974 (film)

Louis Le Barbenchon (1911–1980) was a French production designer, set decorator, and art director. He designed the sets for a number of French film productions.

== Selected filmography ==
- His Uncle from Normandy (1939)
- My Aunt the Dictator (1939)
- Mandrin (1947)
- The Village of Wrath (1947)
- Chinese Quarter (1947)
- The Barber of Seville (1948)
- Three Investigations (1948)
- The Red Signal (1949)
- Two Doves (1949)
- They Are Twenty (1950)
- Wedding Night (1950)
- Piédalu in Paris (1951)
- Piédalu Works Miracles (1952)
- Women Without Hope (1954)
- The Babes Make the Law (1955)
- Baratin (1956)
- The Babes in the Secret Service (1956)
- Tartarin of Tarascon (1962)
- The Hostage Gang (1973)

== Bibliography ==
- Armes, Roy. French Cinema Since 1946: The Personal Style. Zwemmer, 1966.
- Driskell, Jonathan. Marcel Carne. Manchester University Press, 2016.
