= Georges Grey =

French actor

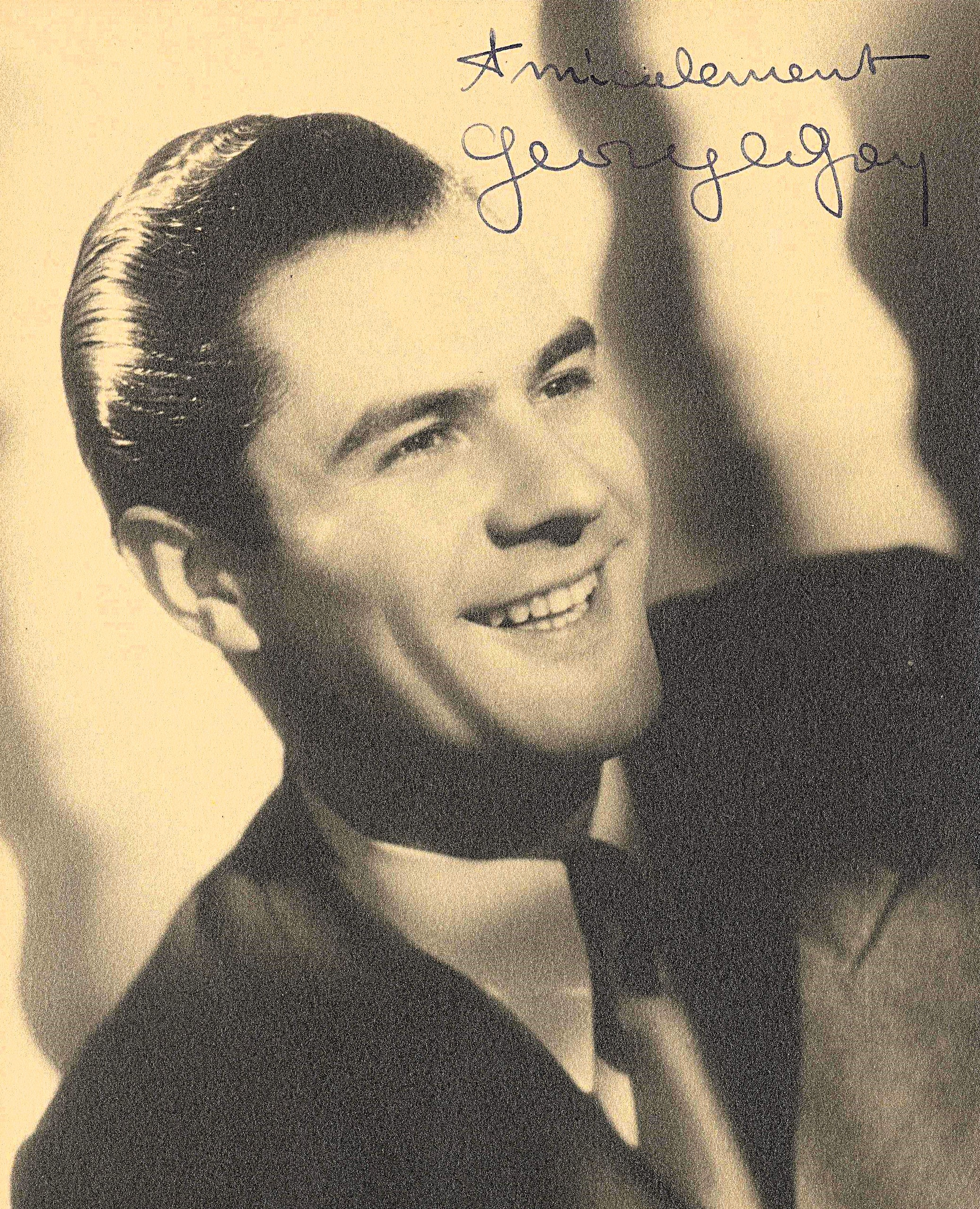
- Born: Georges-Jean-Joseph Gacon; January 19, 1911; Lyon, France
- Died: April 2, 1954 (aged 43); Passy, Haute-Savoie
- Resting place: Guillotière Cemetery
- Occupation: Actor
- Years active: 1937-1949

Georges Grey, born Georges-Jean-Joseph Gacon (1911–1954) was a French actor. In 1948 he starred in the film The Lame Devil under Sacha Guitry.

== Biography ==
He studied engineering at university, before going to the Saumur Cavalry School. He then went to Paris to begin a career as an actor, where he was noticed by Sacha Guitry who began giving him roles in his films. He toured with Marcel Pagnol and Gilles Grangier later on in life.

He died of tuberculosis in a sanatorium on April 2, 1954, in Passy.

== Filmography ==
=== Film ===
- 1937: Cinderella, Pierre Caron
- 1937: The Pearls of the Crown, Sacha Guitry and Christian-Jaque
- 1937: Quadrille, Sacha Guitry
- 1938: Remontons les Champs-Élysées, Sacha Guitry
- 1938: Nine Bachelors, Sacha Guitry
- 1940: Narcisse, Ayres d'Aguiar
- 1940: Monsieur Hector, Maurice Cammage
- 1940: Room 13, André Hugon
- 1940: Hangman's Noose, Léon Mathot
- 1940: The Well-Digger's Daughter, Marcel Pagnol
- 1941: Cartacalha, reine des gitans, Léon Mathot
- 1941: The Master Valet, Paul Mesnier
- 1941: Le Destin fabuleux de Désirée Clary, Sacha Guitry
- 1942: La Duchesse de Langeais, Jacques de Baroncelli
- 1942: The Blue Veil, Jean Stelli
- 1942: Eight Men in a Castle, Richard Pottier
- 1942: Patricia, Paul Mesnier
- 1943: Adémaï bandit d'honneur, Gilles Grangier
- 1945: Monsieur Grégoire Escapes, Jacques Daniel-Norman
- 1947: Plume la poule, Walter Kapps
- 1947: Third at Heart, Jacques de Casembroot
- 1947: Le Comédien, Sacha Guitry
- 1948: The Lame Devil, Sacha Guitry
- 1948: The Farm of Seven Sins, Jean Devaivre
- 1948: Le Colonel Durand, René Chanas

=== Theatre ===
- 1937: Quadrille, Sacha Guitry (Théâtre de la Madeleine)
- 1948: Le Diable boiteux (theatre adaptation), Sacha Guitry (Théâtre Édouard VII)
- 1949: Quadrille, Sacha Guitry (Théâtre des Célestins)
