= Marcel Vallée =

French actor

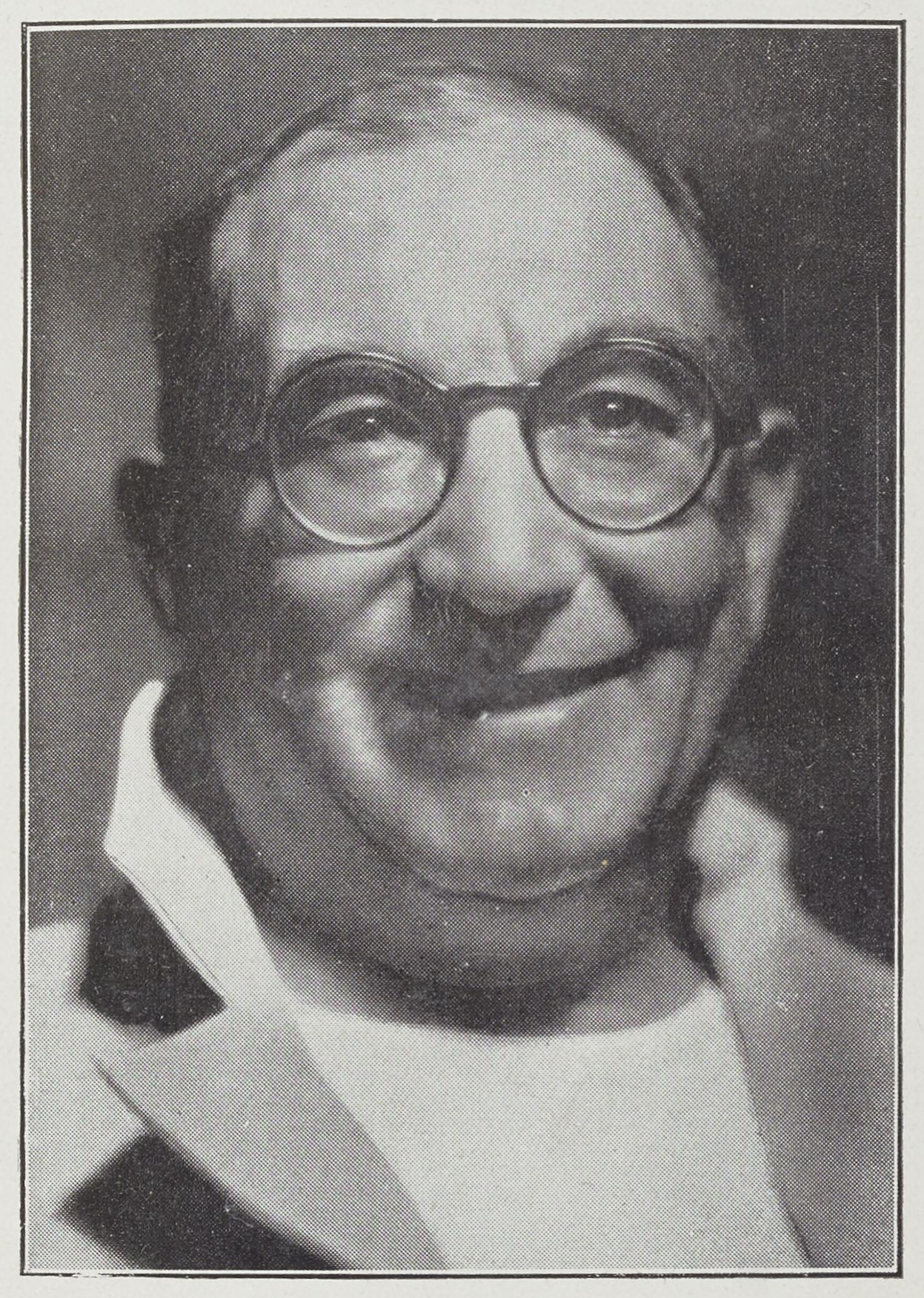
- Born: 15 January 1880; 3rd arrondissement of Paris, France
- Died: 31 October 1957 (aged 77); Fontaine-le-Port, France
- Occupation: Actor
- Years active: 1906-1957

Marcel Vallée (15 January 1880, in Paris – 31 October 1957, in Fontaine-le-Port) was a French actor, primarily of the theater. He began working in films with Max Linder in 1906. He appeared in some American films.

== Selected filmography ==
- My Aunt from Honfleur (1923)
- The Mystery of the Yellow Room (1930)
- Paris by Night (1930)
- The Girl and the Boy (1931)
- Alone (1931)
- The Night at the Hotel (1932)
- Côte d'Azur (1932)
- Nights in Port Said (1932)
- A Star Disappears (1932)
- The Champion Cook (1932)
- Topaze (1933)
- The Little King (1933)
- Judex (1934)
- Song of Farewell (1934)
- Divine (1935)
- Prince of the Six Days (1936)
- Wolves Between Them (1936)
- Miarka (1937)
- Cinderella (1937)
- The Man from Nowhere (1937)
- Beautiful Star (1938)
- My Priest Among the Rich (1938)
- Prince of My Heart (1938)
- Paid Holidays (1938)
- Prince Bouboule (1939)
- His Uncle from Normandy (1939)
- The Duraton Family (1939)
- Whirlwind of Paris (1939)
- Serenade (1940)
- Moulin Rouge (1941)
- The Suitors Club (1941)
- The Blue Veil (1942)
- The Newspaper Falls at Five O'Clock (1942)
- The Woman I Loved Most (1942)
- Madly in Love (1943)
- The Midnight Sun (1943)
- The Ideal Couple (1946)
- That's Not the Way to Die (1946)
- Rooster Heart (1946)
- Rendezvous in Paris (1947)
- The Ironmaster (1948)
- Night Round (1949)
- Branquignol (1949)
- Three Sailors in a Convent (1950)
- Topaze (1951)
- Adele's Gift (1951)
- The Red Head (1952)
- The Priest of Saint-Amour (1952)
- When Do You Commit Suicide? (1953)
