= Meeting in Paris =

1956 film

- Directed by: Georges Lampin
- Written by: Gabriel Arout; Jean Bernard-Luc
- Produced by: Jules Borkon
- Starring: Robert Lamoureux; Betsy Blair; Jacques Castelot
- Cinematography: Christian Matras
- Edited by: Gabriel Rongier
- Music by: Georges Van Parys
- Production companies: Champs-Élysées Productions; Lamber Films
- Release date: 2 May 1956
- Running time: 90 minutes
- Country: France
- Language: French

Meeting in Paris (French: Rencontre à Paris) is a 1956 French comedy film directed by Georges Lampin and starring Robert Lamoureux, Betsy Blair and Jacques Castelot.

The film's sets were designed by the art director Jacques Colombier.

== Cast ==
- Robert Lamoureux as Maurice Legrand
- Betsy Blair as Nancy Blanding
- Jacques Castelot as Marquis Arnaud de Cernay
- Raymond Bussières as Albert
- Mona Goya as Madame Payette
- Jess Hahn as Henry
- Monette Dinay as Madame Jeanne
- Pierre Dux as Florent Saint-Valier
- Julien Carette as The thickness
- Jacques Duby as The pastor
- Gérard Séty as The sculptor
- Claude Brasseur as The young man
- Pauline Carton as The salvationist
- Roger Carel as The cop in front of the Ritz
- Paul Demange as The passer
- Émile Genevois as The mason
- Jacques Hilling as The Fishmonger
- Albert Michel as The locksmith
- Gaston Modot as The Temple employee
- Jean Rochefort as The intern
- Gabriel Gobin
- Dominique Davray
- Nane Germon
- William Marshall

== Bibliography ==
- Parish, James Robert. Film Actors Guide. Scarecrow Press, 1977.
