= The Babes in the Secret Service =

1956 film

- Directed by: Raoul André
- Written by: Raymond Caillava
- Produced by: Emile Darbel
- Starring: Claudine Dupuis; Louise Carletti; Tilda Thamar
- Cinematography: André Germain
- Edited by: Gabriel Rongier
- Music by: Daniel White
- Production company: Eole Productions
- Distributed by: Les Films Marceau
- Release date: 10 August 1956
- Running time: 97 minutes
- Country: France
- Language: French

The Babes in the Secret Service (French: Les pépées au service secret) is a 1956 French comedy thriller film directed by Raoul André and starring Claudine Dupuis, Louise Carletti and Tilda Thamar. The film's sets were designed by the art director Louis Le Barbenchon. It is a sequel to the 1955 film The Babes Make the Law.

== Synopsis ==
Having already proven their capabilities in their previous adventures, three sisters are recruited by the French secret service to track down some wanted information on a new explosive device.

== Cast ==
- Claudine Dupuis as Elvire
- Louise Carletti as Christine
- Tilda Thamar as Olga
- Raymond Souplex as Bonneval
- Robert Berri as Carboni
- Simone Berthier as Hortense
- Alain Bouvette as La Quille
- Paul Demange as Le chef d'orchestre
- Fabienne as Antigone
- Harry-Max as Le médecin de la prison
- René Havard as Calamar / Sébastien / Le clochard
- Abel Jacquin as Le directeur de la prison
- Robert Le Béal as Gauthier
- Roger Legris as Le blanchisseur de la prison
- Michèle Philippe as Nathalie
- André Versini as Martin

== Bibliography ==
- Pallister, Janet L. French-speaking Women Film Directors: A Guide. Fairleigh Dickinson Univ Press, 1997.
- Rège, Philippe. Encyclopedia of French Film Directors, Volume 1. Scarecrow Press, 2009.
