= Georges Lampin =

French actor and director (1901–1979)

- Born: 14 October 1901; Saint Petersburg, Russia
- Died: 8 May 1979 (aged 77); Pau, France
- Occupation: Film director
- Years active: 1946–1963

Georges Lampin (French pronunciation: [ʒɔʁʒ lɑ̃pɛ̃]; 14 October 1901 – 8 May 1979) was a French actor and film director. He directed twelve films between 1946 and 1963.

== Selected filmography ==
=== Director ===
- The Idiot (1946)
- Eternal Conflict (1948)
- Return to Life (1949)
- The Hell of Lost Pilots (1949)
- Old Boys of Saint-Loup (1950)
- Passion (1951)
- The House on the Dune (1952)
- Follow That Man (1953)
- Crime and Punishment (1956)
- Meeting in Paris (1956)
- La Tour, prends garde ! (1958)
- Mathias Sandorf (1963)

=== Actor ===
- Carmen (1926)
- Napoleon (1927)

=== Producer ===
- Adrienne Lecouvreur (1938)
- Foolish Husbands (1941)

=== Screenwriter ===
- The Slipper Episode (1935)
