= The Last Metro (1945 film) =

1945 French crime film

- Directed by: Maurice de Canonge
- Written by: Tristan Bernard (novel); Michel Duran
- Starring: Gaby Morlay; Alexandre Rignault[Mony Dalmès
- Cinematography: René Gaveau
- Edited by: Monique Kirsanoff
- Music by: Jacques Dupont
- Production company: C.F.D.F.
- Distributed by: La Compagnie Parisienne de Location de Films
- Release date: 27 June 1945
- Running time: 98 minutes
- Country: France
- Language: French

The Last Metro (French: Dernier métro) is a 1945 French crime film directed by Maurice de Canonge and starring Gaby Morlay, Alexandre Rignault and Mony Dalmès. It was based on the 1912 novel Mathilde et ses mitaines by Tristan Bernard.

The film's sets were designed by the art director Claude Bouxin. It recorded admissions in France of 2,218,391.

== Synopsis ==
Leaving the station after having caught the last Paris Metro, a man comes to the rescue of a woman who is being assaulted and finds himself drawn into her affairs.

== Cast ==
- Gaby Morlay as Mathilde Bourgeot
- Alexandre Rignault as Bourgeot
- Mony Dalmès as Rose Askien
- Fernand Fabre as Robert Askien
- Maurice Baquet as Henri Remonge
- Edmond Beauchamp
- Geno Ferny
- Jean-Jacques Delbo
- Georges Sellier
- Paul Delauzac
- Léon Bary
- Raymond Galle
- Arthur Devère
- Louis Florencie
- Paul Demange
- Marcelle Géniat
- Jeanne Helbling
- Madeleine Suffel
- Marguerite Ducouret
- Perrette Perrin

== Bibliography ==
- Goble, Alan. The Complete Index to Literary Sources in Film. Walter de Gruyter, 1999.
