= The Chain Breaker =

1941 film

- Directed by: Jacques Daniel-Norman
- Written by: Jean Sarment
- Produced by: Christian Stengel
- Starring: Pierre Fresnay; Marcelle Géniat; Blanchette Brunoy; Ginette Leclerc
- Cinematography: Christian Matras
- Edited by: Mireille Bessette
- Music by: Vincent Scotto
- Production company: Pathé Consortium Cinéma
- Distributed by: Pathé Consortium Cinéma
- Release date: 23 December 1941
- Running time: 117 minutes
- Country: France
- Language: French

The Chain Breaker (French: Le briseur de chaînes) is a 1941 French comedy drama film directed by Jacques Daniel-Norman and starring Pierre Fresnay, Marcelle Géniat, Blanchette Brunoy and Ginette Leclerc. It was shot at the Joinville Studios of Pathé in Paris. The film's sets were designed by the art director Lucien Aguettand.

== Cast ==
- Pierre Fresnay as Marcus
- Marcelle Géniat as Mamouret
- Blanchette Brunoy as Marie-Jo
- Ginette Leclerc as Graziella
- André Brunot as Antoine Mouret
- Raoul Marco as Alphonse
- Alfred Adam as Guillaume
- Gilberte Géniat as Estelle
- Ginette Baudin as Gisèle
- Marthe Mellot as Héloïse
- René Blancard as Ferdinand
- Jeanne Véniat as Armandine
- Jean-Henri Chambois as Léonard
- Paul Delauzac as Monseigneur Mouret - l'évêque
- René Forval as Le curé
- Julien Maffre as Titin
- Louis Seigner as Le ministre
- Charles Dullin as Esprit Mouret
- Georges Rollin as Laurent
- Ellen Briand as Victorine
- Colette Régis as Madame Ferdinand
- Paula Valmond as Madame Alphonse
- Andrée Sylvane as Madame Jules
- Suzy Yorelle as La cliente
- Georges Vandéric as Le préfet
- Jacques Derives as Le docteur
- Marcel d'Orval as Jules
- Maurice Salabert as Edouard
- Lucien Dorval as Girard
- Raymond Bussières as Le camelot
- Marcel Pérès as Billembois
- Paul Courant as Sonnailles

== Bibliography ==
- Rège, Philippe. Encyclopedia of French Film Directors, Volume 1. Scarecrow Press, 2009.
- Siclier, Jacques. La France de Pétain et son cinéma. H. Veyrier, 1981.
