= Maurice Escande =

French actor

- Born: 14 November 1892; France
- Died: 10 February 1973 (aged 80); France
- Occupation: Actor
- Years active: 1917–1970

Maurice Escande (14 November 1892 – 10 February 1973) was a French stage and film actor. In 1948 he starred in the film The Lame Devil under Sacha Guitry.

== Selected filmography ==
- 1917: Un vol étrange (Short)
- 1918: Simone - Michel Mignier
- 1920: L'essor - Max de Chéroy
- 1921: Mademoiselle de La Seiglière - Raoul de Vaubert
- 1921: Fromont jeune et Risler aîné - Fromont jeune
- 1921: Les trois lys (Short)
- 1922: La ferme du choquart - Le marquis de Montaillé
- 1922: Molière, sa vie, son oeuvre
- 1923: Les deux soldats - Julien Farjol
- 1924: Un gentleman neurasthénique
- 1925: Nantas - Desfondettes
- 1925: La damnation de Faust
- 1931: Luck
- 1932: Kiss Me - Gaston
- 1932: Chassé-croisé
- 1932: The Three Musketeers - Buckingham
- 1932: Totoche et compagnie
- 1933: Le gendre de Monsieur Poirier - Hector de Montmeyran
- 1933: Son altesse impériale - Le comte Symoff
- 1933: Jeunes filles à marier - John Gordon
- 1935: The Scandalous Couple - Desbonnières
- 1935: Dora Nelson - Santini
- 1935: Lucrezia Borgia - Jean Borgia, Duke of Gandie
- 1935: The Green Domino (Le domino vert) - Henri Bruquier - un critique d'art
- 1935: Un soir à la Comédie Française (Documentary)
- 1936: Le collier du grand duc - L'inspecteur
- 1936: La Garçonne (La garçonne) - Lucien Vigneret
- 1936: Les deux gamines - Pierre Manin
- 1936: Sept hommes, une femme - Bizulier
- 1936: The Two Boys - Georges de Kerlor
- 1936: Tout va très bien madame la marquise - Le marquis des Esnards
- 1936: Les demi vierges - Julien de Suberceaux
- 1936: Les petites alliées - Le duc de Lestissac
- 1937: The Red Dancer - Ursac
- 1937: Cinderella - Gilbert
- 1937: The Messenger - Géo
- 1938: La Marseillaise - Le seigneur du village
- 1938: Liberty - Auguste Bartholdi
- 1938: Café de Paris - Le marquis de Perelli
- 1939: La belle revanche - Jacques Dorcel
- 1940: Paris-New York - Conrad
- 1941: Moulin Rouge - Colorado
- 1941: The Black Diamond - Guy de Fresnoy
- 1941: Madame Sans-Gêne - Le comte de Neipperg
- 1942: The Woman I Loved Most - Gaëtan
- 1942: Étoiles de demain (Short, Documentary)
- 1942: Patricia - André Vernon
- 1943: Captain Fracasse - Le marquis des Bruyères / Il marchese di Bruyeres
- 1944: La vie de plaisir - Le comte Roger de Boëldieu - un mondain, le fiancé d'Hélène
- 1945: Farandole - Le procureur
- 1945: Father Goriot - Monsieur de Restaud
- 1945: Échec au roy - Le roi Louis XIV
- 1945: Bifur 3 - Alvarez
- 1946: The Captain - Le prince de Condé
- 1946: The Queen's Necklace - Le cardinal de Rohan
- 1947: Hymenée - L'industriel Pierre Vairon
- 1948: The Renegade - Le caïd Tahmar
- 1948: Man to Men - Jérôme de Lormel
- 1948: The Lame Devil (Le diable boîteux) - Randall
- 1949: Monseigneur - Le duc de Saint Germain
- 1950: Amour et compagnie - M. Lecourtois
- 1951: L'Étrange Madame X - Jacques Voisin-Larive
- 1951: Coq en pâte - Me Jacques Lion
- 1952: Buridan, héros de la tour de Nesle - Enguerrand de Marigny
- 1952: Jouons le jeu - l'acteur (segment 'L'optimisme')
- 1953: Quintuplets in the Boarding School - Le comte
- 1953: The Lady of the Camellias - Le duc
- 1955: Caroline and the Rebels - (uncredited)
- 1955: Napoléon - Louis XV (uncredited)
- 1956: If Paris Were Told to Us (Si Paris nous était conté)
- 1955: Le fils de Caroline Chérie - Le Baron de Grimm
- 1960: Antigone (TV Movie)
- 1963: Les animaux
- 1964: Comment épouser un premier ministre - Grandbourg
- 1966: Martin Soldat (Martin soldat) - Le président du jury pour la Comédie-Française
- 1971: Le cinéma de papa - Le metteur en scène académicien (final film role)
