= André Brunot =

French actor (1879–1973)

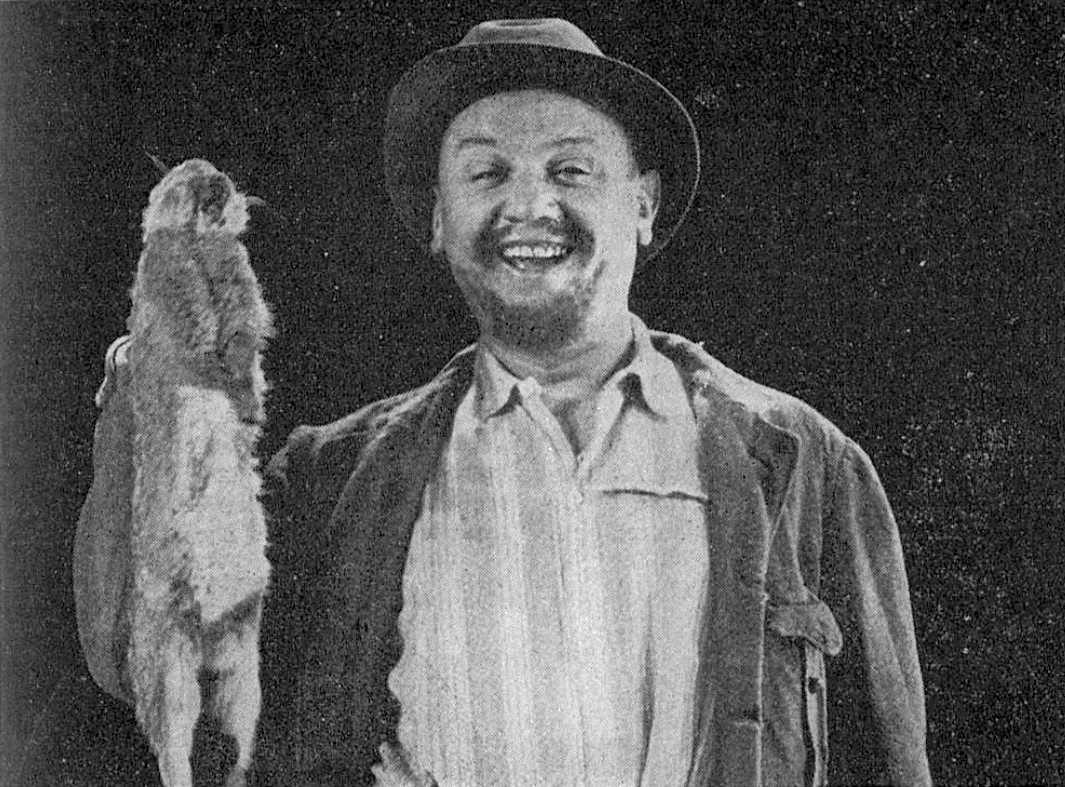
- Born: 3 October 1879; Prémery, France
- Died: 6 August 1973 (aged 93); Boulogne-Billancourt, France
- Occupation: Actor
- Years active: 1910-1966

André Brunot (French: [ɑ̃dʁe bʁyno]; 3 October 1879 – 6 August 1973) was a French film actor. He appeared in more than twenty films from 1910 to 1966.

He was also a stage actor, being the 351st Sociétaires of the Comédie-Française.

== Filmography ==
Film
| Year | Title | Role | Notes |
|---|---|---|---|
| 1923 | L'affaire Blaireau | Blaireau | |
| 1924 | L'étrange aventure | Le beau frisé | |
| 1934 | Les précieuses ridicules | | |
| 1938 | The Curtain Rises | Monsieur Grenaison | |
| 1938 | Hôtel du Nord | Emile Lecouvreur | |
| 1939 | Personal Column | Le commissaire Ténier | |
| 1941 | Portrait of Innocence | Le commissaire | |
| 1941 | The Chain Breaker | Antoine Mouret | |
| 1942 | La maison des sept jeunes filles | Monsieur Adelin | |
| 1942 | The Beautiful Adventure | Le comte d'Eguzon | |
| 1944 | La Rabouilleuse | Le capitaine Renard | |
| 1946 | Pas un mot à la reine mère | Harry Portman | |
| 1947 | Vertigo | Loiseau | |
| 1947 | The Sharks of Gibraltar | Colonel Becker | |
| 1948 | Le comédien | | |
| 1948 | The White Night | Lestrade | |
| 1948 | The Lame Devil | Dr. Bartolo | |
| 1949 | Two Loves | Nestor, directeur du cirque | |
| 1953 | La Vie d'un honnête homme | the doctor Ogier | |
| 1954 | The Count of Monte Cristo | L'armateur Morel | |
| 1954 | Leguignon the Healer | Dr. Martinet | |
| 1954 | The Red and the Black | L'abbé Chélan | |
| 1958 | Maxime | Le Général Le Questin, dit 'Chi-Chi' | |
| 1959 | Les affreux | Le directeur des pétroles | |
| 1959 | Picnic on the Grass | Le Curé | |
