= Marcel Pérès (actor) =

French actor (1898–1974)

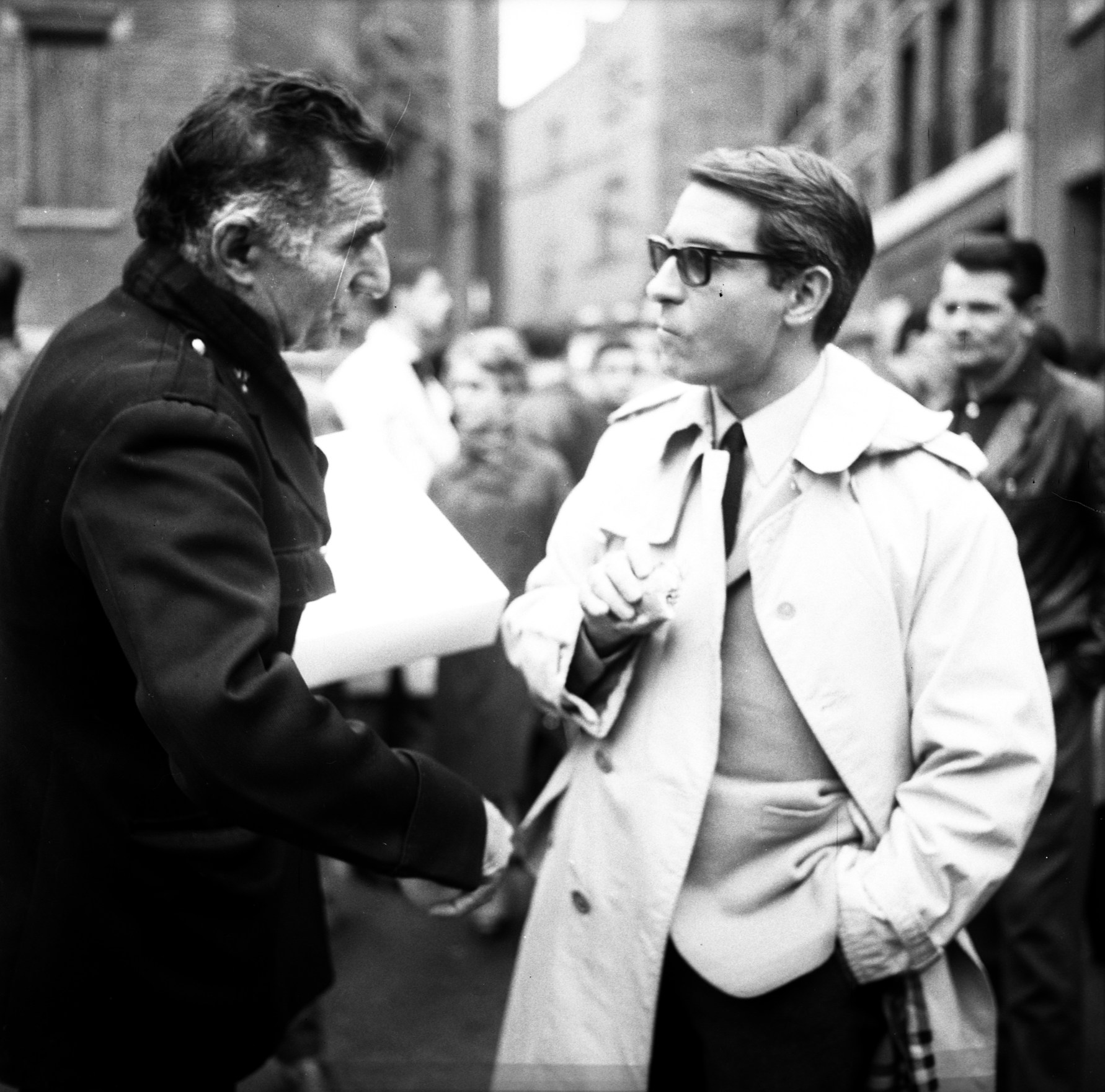
- Pérès (left) with Jean Poiret while filming Your Money or Your Life in Toulouse in 1965.
- Born: 24 January 1898; Castelsarrasin, Tarn-et-Garonne, France
- Died: 28 June 1974 (aged 76); Châlette-sur-Loing, Loiret, France
- Occupation: Actor
- Years active: 1927–1974 (film)

Marcel Pérès (1898–1974) was a French film actor who acted prolifically during his long career. He was a character actor often playing smaller, supporting roles.

== Selected filmography ==
- Port of Shadows (1938)
- Return at Dawn (1938)
- The Postmaster's Daughter (1938)
- Women's Prison (1938)
- Ultimatum (1938)
- The Human Beast (1938)
- Crossroads (1938)
- The Mayor's Dilemma (1939)
- Place de la Concorde (1939)
- Midnight Tradition (1939)
- The Phantom Carriage (1939)
- The Emigrant (1940)
- Night in December (1940)
- Radio Surprises (1940)
- Sins of Youth (1941)
- The Pavilion Burns (1941)
- The Chain Breaker (1941)
- Portrait of Innocence (1941)
- Who Killed Santa Claus? (1941)
- Business Is Business (1942)
- The Newspaper Falls at Five O'Clock (1942)
- The Stairs Without End (1943)
- It Happened at the Inn (1943)
- Shot in the Night (1943)
- Goodbye Leonard (1943)
- Children of Paradise (1945)
- The Bellman (1945)
- St. Val's Mystery (1945)
- François Villon (1945)
- Panic (1946)
- Lunegarde (1946)
- Monsieur Grégoire Escapes (1946)
- Raboliot (1946)
- Roger la Honte (1946)
- Monsieur Vincent (1947)
- The Great Maguet (1947)
- The Adventures of Casanova (1947)
- Mystery Trip (1947)
- The Beautiful Trip (1947)
- The Cupboard Was Bare (1948)
- Clochemerle (1948)
- The Shadow (1948)
- Scandal (1948)
- The Eleven O'Clock Woman (1948)
- The Renegade (1948)
- The Lovers Of Verona (1949)
- Fantomas Against Fantomas (1949)
- The Widow and the Innocent (1949)
- The Farm of Seven Sins (1949)
- Justice Is Done (1950)
- Amédée (1950)
- Farewell Mister Grock (1950)
- Cartouche, King of Paris (1950)
- Two Pennies Worth of Violets (1951)
- The Darling of His Concierge (1951)
- Life Is a Game (1951)
- Monsieur Octave (1951)
- Nightclub (1951)
- Crimson Curtain (1952)
- Alone in the World (1952)
- A Mother's Secret (1952)
- Alarm in Morocco (1953)
- Children of Love (1953)
- The Virtuous Scoundrel (1953)
- Before the Deluge (1954)
- Cadet Rousselle (1954)
- Caroline and the Rebels (1955)
- Gas-Oil (1955)
- The Whole Town Accuses (1956)
- Paris Holiday (1956)
- Blood to the Head (1956)
- I'll Get Back to Kandara (1956)
- Three Days to Live (1957)
- A Friend of the Family (1957)
- The Enigma of the Folies-Bergere (1959)
- Maigret and the Saint-Fiacre Case (1959)
- Interpol Against X (1960)
- Women Are Like That (1960)
- Where the Truth Lies (1962)
- Méfiez-vous, mesdames (1963)
- Heaven Sent (1963)
- Les Bricoleurs (1963)
- Your Money or Your Life (1966)
- A Very Curious Girl (1969)
- The Milky Way (1969)
- Solo (1970)
- La Part des lions (1971)
- The Phantom of Liberty (1974)

== Bibliography ==
- Crisp, Colin. French Cinema—A Critical Filmography: Volume 1, 1929-1939. Indiana University Press, 2015.
- Goble, Alan. The Complete Index to Literary Sources in Film. Walter de Gruyter, 1999.
- Neibaur, James L. The Bob Hope Films. McFarland, 2004.
