= Annie France =

French actress (1915–2012)

- Born: 16 February 1915; Paris, France
- Died: 21 July 2012 (aged 97); Switzerland
- Occupation: Actress
- Years active: 1937–1946 (film)

Annie France (1915–2012) was a French film actress active during the 1930s and 1940s.

== Selected filmography ==
- White Cargo (1937)
- Crossroads (1938)
- Fort Dolorès (1939)
- The Duraton Family (1939)
- Bécassine (1940)
- The Suitors Club (1941)
- Moulin Rouge (1941)
- The Last Penny (1946)

== Bibliography ==
- Goble, Alan. The Complete Index to Literary Sources in Film. Walter de Gruyter, 1999.
