= Jean Delannoy =

French actor and film director (1908–2008)

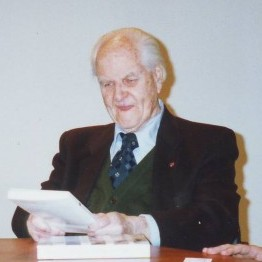
- Delannoy in the 2000s
- Born: 12 January 1908; Noisy-le-Sec, France
- Died: 18 June 2008 (aged 100); Guainville, France
- Occupations: Actor; film editor; screenwriter; film director
- Years active: 1927–1995
- Awards: Honorary César (1986; Lifetime Achievement)

Jean Delannoy (French pronunciation: [ʒɑ̃ dəlanwa]; 12 January 1908 – 18 June 2008) was a French actor, film editor, screenwriter and film director.

== Biography ==
Although Delannoy was born in a Paris suburb, his family was from Haute-Normandie in the north of France. He was a Protestant, a descendant of Huguenots, some of whom fled the country during the French Wars of Religion, and settled first in Wallonia. Afterwards, their name became De la Noye and then Delano, who were on the second ship to immigrate to Plymouth, Massachusetts.

He was a student in Paris when he began acting in silent films. He eventually landed a job with Paramount Studios Parisian facilities, working his way up to head film editor. In 1934 he directed his first film and went on to a long career, both writing and directing. In 1946, his film about a Protestant minister titled La symphonie pastorale was awarded the Palme d'Or at the Cannes Film Festival. In 1960, his film, Maigret tend un piège was nominated for a BAFTA award for "Best Film from any Source". In recognition of his long service to the French motion picture industry, in 1986 Delannoy received an Honorary César Award.

Delannoy died on 18 June 2008, at the age of 100.

== Partial filmography ==
- Miss Helyett (1928)
- The Beautiful Sailor (1932)
- The Improvised Son (1932)
- My Hat (1933)
- The Premature Father (1933) (editor)
- Paris-Deauville (1934)
- Casanova (1934)
- Women's Club (1936) (assistant director)
- Nitchevo (1936)
- Michel Strogoff (1936)
- Golden Venus (1938)
- Tamara (1938)
- The Black Diamond (1941)
- The Murderer is Afraid at Night (1942)
- Macao (1942)
- Fever (1942)
- Colonel Pontcarral (1942)
- L'Éternel retour (1943)
- Pastoral Symphony (1946)
- Les jeux sont faits (1947)
- To the Eyes of Memory (1948)
- The Secret of Mayerling (1949)
- God Needs Men (1950)
- Savage Triangle (1951)
- La Minute de vérité (1952)
- Napoleon Road (1953)
- Destinées (1954)
- Obsession (1954)
- The Little Rebels (1955)
- Marie-Antoinette reine de France (1956)
- The Hunchback of Notre Dame (French title: Notre-Dame de Paris) (1957)
- Maigret Sets a Trap (1958)
- Maigret and the Saint-Fiacre Case (1959)
- Guinguette (1959)
- Rendezvous (1961)
- Venere Imperiale (1963)
- Les amitiés particulières (1964)
- Le Lit a Deux Places (1965)
- The Majordomo (1965)
- Le Lit à deux places (1966)
- Les Sultans (1966)
- Action Man (1967)
- La Peau de torpedo (1970)
- Not Dumb, The Bird (1972)
- Le Jeune Homme et le Lion (1976 television film)
- Histoire du chevalier Des Grieux et de Manon Lescaut (1978 6-episode television series)
- Les Grandes Conjurations : Le Coup d'État du 2 décembre (1979 episode of a television series)
- L'Été indien (1980 television film)
- Frère Martin (La justice de Dieu, La justice du Pape) (1981 television film in two parts)
- Le Crime de Pierre Lacaze (1983 television film in two parts)
- L'Énigmatique Monsieur S. ou Tout est dans la fin (1987 television film)
- Bernadette (1987)
- La Passion de Bernadette (1989 sequel to Bernadette that was only distributed in Lourdes)
- Le Gorille compte ses abattis (1990 episode in the Le Gorille television series)
- Marie de Nazareth (1995) released in English as Mary of Nazareth (2003)
