= René Havard =

French actor

- Born: 20 December 1923; Paris, France
- Died: 7 December 1987 (aged 63); Paris, France
- Occupation: Actor
- Years active: 1946–1985

René Havard (20 December 1923 – 7 December 1987) was a French film actor. He appeared in 80 films between 1946 and 1985. He was born and died in Paris, France.

== Selected filmography ==
- That's Not the Way to Die (1946) – L'assistant
- La bataille du feu (1949)
- Follow That Man (1953) – Un inspecteur
- Le Guérisseur (1953) – Un interne
- The Unfrocked One (1954) – Un officier
- Quay of Blondes (1954)
- The Sheep Has Five Legs (1954) – Le liftier
- Poisson d'avril (1954) – L'examinateur
- Women Without Hope (1954) – Le souteneur
- Huis clos (1954) – Un soldat
- The Price of Love (1955)
- The Babes Make the Law (1955) – Calamart
- Série noire (1955) – Rinaldo
- Stopover in Orly (1955) – André
- Sophie and the Crime (1955) – Tony
- Gueule d'ange (1955) – Caniche
- Les indiscrètes (1956) – Maurice
- The Babes in the Secret Service (1956) – Calamar / Sébastien / Le clochard
- Bob le flambeur (1956) – Inspecteur Morin
- The Mountain (1956) – Radio Operator in Van (uncredited)
- Crime et châtiment (1956) – L'inspecteur Noblet
- L'Homme et l'Enfant (1956) – Un complice de Zajir
- Les violents (1957) – Inspecteur Damien
- The Suspects (1957) – Un technicien sud-tunisien
- La Polka des menottes (1957) – Roger Le Chinois
- An Eye for an Eye (1957) – L'interne
- Paris clandestin (1957) – Ernest
- Ces dames préfèrent le mambo (1957) – Le timonier de l'Alizée
- Police judiciaire (1958) – Cassou
- Cigarettes, Whiskey and Wild Women (1959) – Fernand
- The Indestructible (1959) – Loulou
- La Valse du Gorille (1959) – Le chimiste
- Babette Goes to War (1959) – Louis
- Rue des prairies (1959) – Le photographe
- The Cow and I (1959) – Vicomte Bussière – prisonnier de guerre
- Le Panier à crabes (1960) – Le premier assistant
- Le Dernier Quart d'heure (1962) – L'inspecteur Moret
- Gigot (1962) – Albert
- À couteaux tirés (1964) – Bobby
- Lost Command (1966) – Fernand
- Line of Demarcation (1966) – Loiseau
- It's Your Move (1969)
- L'Auvergnat et l'Autobus (1969) – Petit rôle (uncredited)
- Les patates (1969) – Lulu
- L'amour (1970) – Le chauffard
- Vogue la galère (1973) – Petit Rouquier
- Innocents with Dirty Hands (1975) – (uncredited)
- Les demoiselles à péage (1975)
- Les Mal Partis (1976) – Le curé du village
- Gloria (1977) – Le chauffeur de taxi qui a fait la Marne
- C'est encore loin l'Amérique? (1980)
- Train d'enfer (1985)
