= The Black Diamond (1941 film) =

- Directed by: Jean Delannoy
- Written by: Jean Aicard (novel); Jean Delannoy
- Produced by: René Keller
- Starring: Charles Vanel; Louise Carletti; Gaby Morlay
- Cinematography: Fédote Bourgasoff
- Music by: Henri Goublier
- Production company: Les Films Minerva
- Distributed by: Les Films Minerva
- Release date: 25 June 1941
- Running time: 98 minutes
- Country: France
- Language: French

The Black Diamond (French: Le diamant noir) is a 1941 French drama film directed by Jean Delannoy and starring Charles Vanel, Louise Carletti and Gaby Morlay. It is a remake of the 1922 silent film of the same title.

The film's sets were designed by the art director Marcel Magniez.

== Cast ==
- Charles Vanel as François Mitry
- Louise Carletti as Nora Mitry
- Gaby Morlay as Mademoiselle Marthe Dubard
- Maurice Escande as Guy de Fresnoy
- Carlettina as Nora à 9ans
- Jean Joffre as Daniel
- Henriette Delannoy as Madame de Morigny
- Jeanne Véniat as Cathy
- Gabrielle Davran as Soeur Angèle
- Paul Demange as Le chauffeur
- Hélène Constant as Thérèse Mitry
- Guy Denancy as Jacques Maurin
- Michel Retaux as Jacques à 12ans
- Jacques Roussel as Vincent
- Georges Paulais as Un invité

== Bibliography ==
- Dayna Oscherwitz & MaryEllen Higgins. The A to Z of French Cinema. Scarecrow Press, 2009.
