= The Suitors Club =

1941 film

- Directed by: Maurice Gleize
- Written by: Marcel Aymé; André Cayatte; Maurice Gleize; Jean Manse
- Produced by: Alfred Greven
- Starring: Fernandel; Louise Carletti; Annie France
- Cinematography: Léonce-Henri Burel
- Edited by: Christian Gaudin
- Music by: Philippe Parès; Georges Van Parys
- Production company: Continental Films
- Distributed by: L'Alliance Cinématographique Européenne
- Release date: 26 September 1941
- Running time: 80 minutes
- Country: France
- Language: French

The Suitors Club (French: Le club des soupirants) is a 1941 French comedy film directed by Maurice Gleize and starring Fernandel, Louise Carletti and Annie France. The film was produced by the German-backed company Continental Films. It was shot at the Marseille Studios and on location around Nice in the Unoccupied Zone. The film's sets were designed by the art director Georges Wakhévitch.

== Plot ==
Having run up heavy debts, a group of young men are persuaded by their creditor to court the wealthy heiress Daisy's hand in marriage. They are given intensive training in the arts of wooing. Amongst them is Antoine a butterfly collector who is more interested in Daisy's cousin Edith. In fact Edith turns out to have the money, while Daisy finds genuine romance with Maxime.

== Cast ==
- Fernandel as Antoine Valoisir
- Louise Carletti as Daisy Cabarus
- Annie France as Édith
- Colette Darfeuil as Paméla Cabarus
- Saturnin Fabre as Cabarus
- Andrex as Maxime
- Max Dearly as Le prince Nirvanoff
- Marcel Vallée as Henri Palmer
- Marguerite de Morlaye as La baronne
- Vanda Gréville as La secrétaire
- Jean Heuzé as Le réceptionniste
- Mag-Avril as La dame du rendez-vous
- Jean Marconi as Le vicomte
- Jean Mello as Un actionnaire du club
- Jean Mercure as Le soupirant à lorgnon
- Gaston Orbal as Albert
- Georges Péclet as Un actionnaire du club
- Gaston Séverin as Le directeur de l'hôtel

== Production ==
Marcel Pagnol rented his studio in southern France to Continental Films in early 1941. Filming started in April, but was stopped by Vichy authorities due to the "immoral and false insinuations that it contains about French society". Maurice Gleize consulted with the Propaganda Abteilung which respected the French government's right to censor films, but that censoring films in the Zone libre was "not a sound policy". This was the only Continental film made in southern France.

== Works cited ==
- Bowles, Brett (2009). "Accommodating Vichy: the politics of Marcel Pagnol's La Fille du puisatier". Historical Reflections. 35 (2). Berghahn Books.

== Bibliography ==
- Leteux, Christine. Continental Films: French Cinema under German Control. University of Wisconsin Press, 2022.
- Rège, Philippe. Encyclopedia of French Film Directors, Volume 1. Scarecrow Press, 2009.
- Siclier, Jacques. La France de Pétain et son cinéma. H. Veyrier, 1981.
