= Moulin Rouge (1941 film) =

1941 film

- Directed by: André Hugon; Yves Mirande
- Written by: André Hugon; Yves Mirande
- Produced by: André Hugon
- Starring: Lucien Baroux; René Dary; Annie France
- Cinematography: Raymond Agnel
- Edited by: Louise Mazier
- Music by: Jean Lenoir; Raoul Moretti; Lucien Pipon; René Sylviano; Georges Van Parys
- Production company: Productions André Hugon
- Distributed by: Cinéma de France
- Release date: 15 February 1941
- Running time: 98 minutes
- Country: France
- Language: French

Moulin Rouge is a 1941 French musical comedy film directed by André Hugon and Yves Mirande and starring Lucien Baroux, René Dary and Annie France. The film's sets were designed by the art directors Lucien Jaquelux and Hugues Laurent.

== Plot summary ==
The story follows Pierre, a down-on-his-luck musician who is hired by the Moulin Rouge cabaret as a composer for a new musical revue. While struggling with his creative block, he meets Simone, a charming dancer who inspires him to create a masterpiece. Along the way, Pierre navigates the tumultuous relationships within the Moulin Rouge troupe, including conflicts with the cabaret's flamboyant manager and an old flame who resurfaces. The film culminates in a grand performance that brings Pierre success, while love blossoms between him and Simone.

== Cast ==
- Lucien Baroux as Loiseau
- René Dary as Lequérec
- Geneviève Callix as Eva
- Pierre Larquey as Perval
- Annie France as Lulu
- Maurice Escande as Colorado
- Simone Berriau as L'amie de Colorado
- Marcel Vallée as Davin
- Marcel Simon as Le directeur des pompes funèbres
- Roger Legris as Le régisseur
- Maxime Fabert as Le commissaire
- Rafael Medina as Chanteur au bal
- Antonin Priolet as Le marin chantant
- Nina Myral as La concierge
- Henri Charrett as Un inspecteur
- Noël Roquevert as Le démarcheur
- Claude Marty as Le deuxième démarcheur
- Paul Faivre as Le concierge
- Émile Saint-Ober as Le livreur
- Nicolas Amato as Le complice de Colorado
- René Alié as Un voyou
- Édouard Francomme as Un maître d'hôtel
- Franck Maurice as Un inspecteur

== Production ==
The film’s sets were designed by prominent French art directors Lucien Jaquelux and Hugues Laurent, creating a vivid recreation of the Moulin Rouge's lavish and decadent atmosphere. The musical numbers, choreographed by Jean Victor, drew inspiration from the actual performances that took place at the famous cabaret during the early 20th century.

Filmed during the German occupation of France in World War II, the production had to navigate various challenges, including restrictions imposed on the French film industry by the Vichy government. Despite these obstacles, Moulin Rouge successfully incorporated light-hearted, escapist themes that resonated with French audiences seeking relief from the difficulties of the time.

== Reception ==
Upon its release in December 1941, Moulin Rouge was well-received by French audiences, who appreciated its humor and lively musical numbers. Although the film did not achieve significant international acclaim, it became a popular example of the French musical comedy genre during the early 1940s.

Critics praised the performances of Lucien Baroux and Annie France, particularly their chemistry on screen. The film's vibrant depiction of Parisian cabaret life was also highlighted as one of its strengths, despite some reviewers noting that the plot was somewhat predictable.

== Legacy ==
Moulin Rouge contributed to the long-standing tradition of films set around the famous Parisian cabaret. Although it didn’t achieve the iconic status of later films with similar themes, such as the 1952 British film Moulin Rouge or Baz Luhrmann's 2001 adaptation, it remains a notable piece of French cinematic history from the World War II era.

== See also ==
- Moulin Rouge (1928 film), a British silent film
- Moulin Rouge (1934 film), an American film
- Moulin Rouge (1952 film), a British film
- Moulin Rouge!, 2001 film directed by Baz Luhrmann

== Bibliography ==
- Bessy, Maurice & Chirat, Raymond. Histoire du cinéma français: encyclopédie des films, 1940–1950. Pygmalion, 1986
- Oscherwitz, Dayna & Higgins, MaryEllen . The A to Z of French Cinema. Scarecrow Press, 2009.
- Rège, Philippe. Encyclopedia of French Film Directors, Volume 1. Scarecrow Press, 2009.
- St. Pierre, Paul Matthew. E.A. Dupont and his Contribution to British Film: Varieté, Moulin Rouge, Piccadilly, Atlantic, Two Worlds, Cape Forlorn. Fairleigh Dickinson University Press, 2010.
