= Louise Carletti =

French actress (1922–2002)

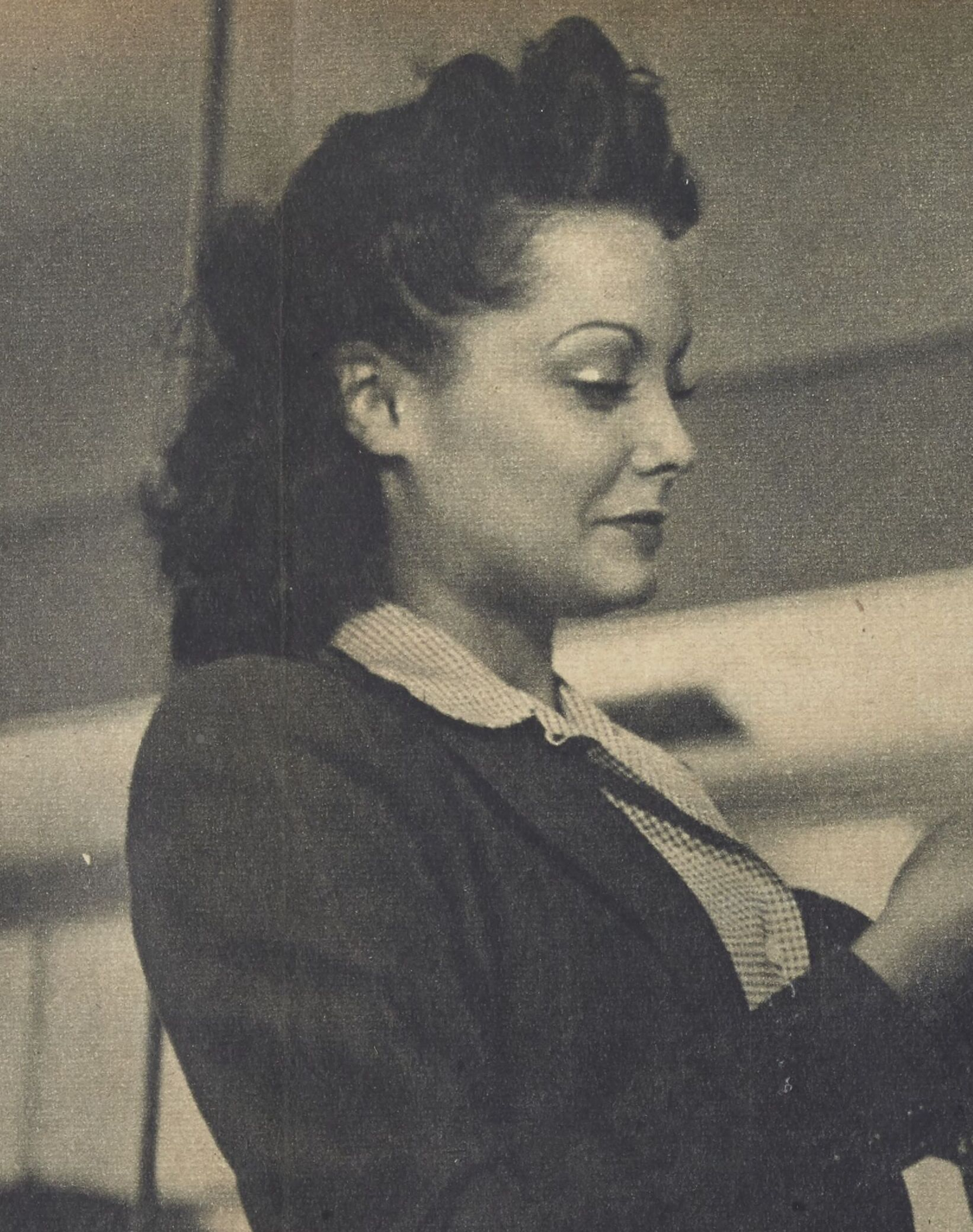
- Louise Carletti (Portrait of Innocence)
- Born: 27 February 1922; Marseille, France
- Died: 10 March 2002 (aged 80); Paris, France
- Occupation: Actress
- Years active: 1938-1973 (film)

Louise Carletti (27 February 1922 – 10 March 2002) was a French film actress. She was married to the director Raoul André.

== Selected filmography ==
- People Who Travel (1938)
- Girls in Distress (1939)
- The White Slave (1939)
- The Black Diamond (1941)
- Portrait of Innocence (1941)
- The Suitors Club (1941)
- Macao (1942)
- Annette and the Blonde Woman (1942)
- Patricia (1942)
- The Murderer is Afraid at Night (1942)
- Mademoiselle Béatrice (1943)
- We Are Not Married (1946)
- The Faceless Enemy (1946)
- The Village of Wrath (1947)
- False Identity (1947)
- The Renegade (1948)
- Good Enough to Eat (1951)
- Women Without Hope (1954)
- The Babes Make the Law (1954)
- The Babes in the Secret Service (1956)
- Mission to Caracas (1965)

== Bibliography ==
- Kennedy-Karpat, Colleen. Rogues, Romance, and Exoticism in French Cinema of the 1930s. Fairleigh Dickinson, 2013.
