= Portrait of Innocence =

1941 film

- Directed by: Louis Daquin
- Written by: Louis Daquin; Marcel Aymé; Maurice Hiléro; Gaston Modot
- Based on: Emil and the Detectives by Erich Kästner
- Produced by: Adrien Remaugé
- Starring: Louise Carletti; Gilbert Gil; André Brunot
- Cinematography: Jean Bachelet
- Edited by: Suzanne de Troeye
- Music by: Marius-François Gaillard
- Production company: Pathé Consortium Cinéma
- Distributed by: Pathé Consortium Cinéma
- Release date: 2 December 1941
- Running time: 90 minutes
- Country: France
- Language: French

Portrait of Innocence (French: Nous les gosses) is a 1941 French comedy drama film directed by Louis Daquin and starring Louise Carletti, Gilbert Gil and André Brunot. It was shot at the Joinville Studios in Paris during the German occupation. The film's sets were designed by the art director Lucien Aguettand. It is also known by the alternative title Us Kids, and drew uncredited inspiration from Erich Kästner's novel Emil and the Detectives. In 1948 Cecil Day-Lewis based his book The Otterbury Incident on the film's screenplay.

== Cast ==
- Louise Carletti as Mariette
- Gilbert Gil as Monsieur Morin, l'instituteur
- André Brunot as Le commissaire
- Marcel Pérès as Victor Lemoine
- Louis Seigner as Le directeur de l'école
- Anthony Gildès as Le père Castor
- Léonce Corne as L'ami de la famille
- Martial Rèbe as Le père de Fernand
- Madeleine Geoffroy as La mère de Fernand
- Jeanne Pérez as La mère de Jeannot
- Henry Darbray as Le client radin
- François Viguier as Le mendiant
- Émile Genevois as Gros Charles
- Lucien Coëdel as Le père de Jeannot
- Robert Arpin as Gégène
- Serge Bedez as Un gamin
- Jean Buquet as Tom Mix
- Jean-Marie Boyer as Lucien Collard
- Liliane Barnassin as Une gamine
- Bernard Daydé as Doudou
- Jean-Pierre Geffroy as Pierrot Roset
- Henri Legoullon as Fernand
- André Lancel as Jeannot
- Jean Samson as Robert
- Raymond Bussières as Gaston
- Pierre Larquey as Le père Finot
- Paul Frankeur as Le secrétaire du commissaire

== Bibliography ==
- Cardullo, Bert (ed.) Bazin at Work: Major Essays and Reviews From the Forties and Fifties. Routledge, 2014.
- Lanzoni, Rémi Fournier . French Cinema: From Its Beginnings to the Present. A&C Black, 2004.
- Rège, Philippe. Encyclopedia of French Film Directors, Volume 1. Scarecrow Press, 2009.
