= René Sylviano =

French composer

- Born: 10 December 1903; Mantes-la-Jolie, Yvelines, France
- Died: 16 October 1993 (aged 89); Paris, France
- Other name: Sylvère Caffot
- Occupation: Composer
- Years active: 1930 - 1974 (film)

René Sylviano (1903–1993) was a French composer who worked on around eighty film scores.

== Selected filmography ==
- Levy and Company (1930)
- Tenderness (1930)
- The Unknown Singer (1931)
- The Improvised Son (1932)
- Nothing But Lies (1933)
- The Premature Father (1933)
- Paris-Soleil (1933)
- The Orderly (1933)
- The Porter from Maxim's (1933)
- The Path to Happiness (1934)
- Francis the First (1937)
- Golden Venus (1938)
- Narcisse (1940)
- Moulin Rouge (1941)
- Annette and the Blonde Woman (1942)
- The Lover of Borneo (1942)
- Love Marriage (1942)
- I Am with You (1943)
- The White Waltz (1943)
- Majestic Hotel Cellars (1945)
- Roger la Honte (1946)
- Her Final Role (1946)
- The Angel They Gave Me (1946)
- The Revenge of Roger (1946)
- The Temptation of Barbizon (1947)
- The Adventures of Casanova (1947)
- The Mysterious Monsieur Sylvain (1947)
- Five Red Tulips (1949)
- Last Love (1949)
- The Happy Man (1950)
- The King of the Bla Bla Bla (1951)
- Love and Desire (1951)
- Grand Gala (1952)
- A Girl on the Road (1952)
- A Woman's Treasure (1953)
- One Step to Eternity (1954)
- The Count of Bragelonne (1954)
- Her First Date (1955)
- The Terror with Women (1956)
- Tides of Passion (1956)
- The Seventh Commandment (1957)
- Women's Prison (1958)
- The Bread Peddler (1963)

== Bibliography ==
- O'Brien, Charles. Cinema's Conversion to Sound: Technology and Film Style in France and the U.S.. Indiana University Press, 2005.
