= Gaby Morlay =

French actress (1893–1964)

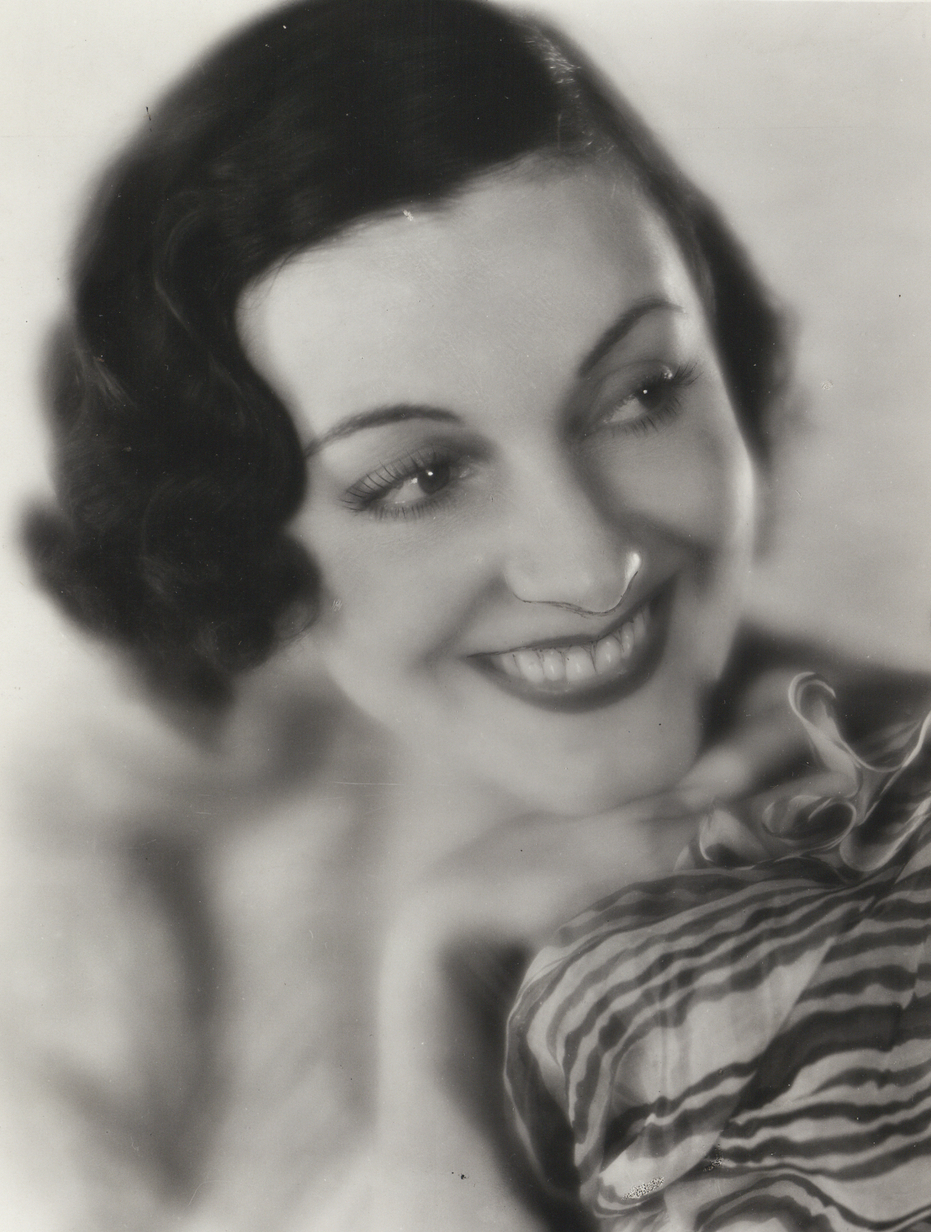
- Born: Blanche Pauline Fumoleau; 8 June 1893; Angers, Maine-et-Loire; France
- Died: 4 July 1964 (aged 71); Nice, Alpes-Maritimes; France
- Occupation: Film actress
- Years active: 1913–1964

Gaby Morlay (born Blanche Pauline Fumoleau; 8 June 1893 – 4 July 1964) was a film actress from France.

== Career ==
Morlay began acting in the era of silent films, and became known as co-star with Max Linder in his "Max" series. She starred in a series of "Gaby" films such as Gaby en auto (1917) and more than 20 other silent films. She moved easily into talking films in the early 1930s. She played Queen Victoria in the 1939 historical film Entente cordiale.

She had an affair with the government minister Max Bonnafous (1900–75) during World War II, and as a result, she was investigated for collaboration with the Nazis after the liberation of France. Later she married Bonnafous. Morlay continued to play important roles in the 1940s and 1950s.

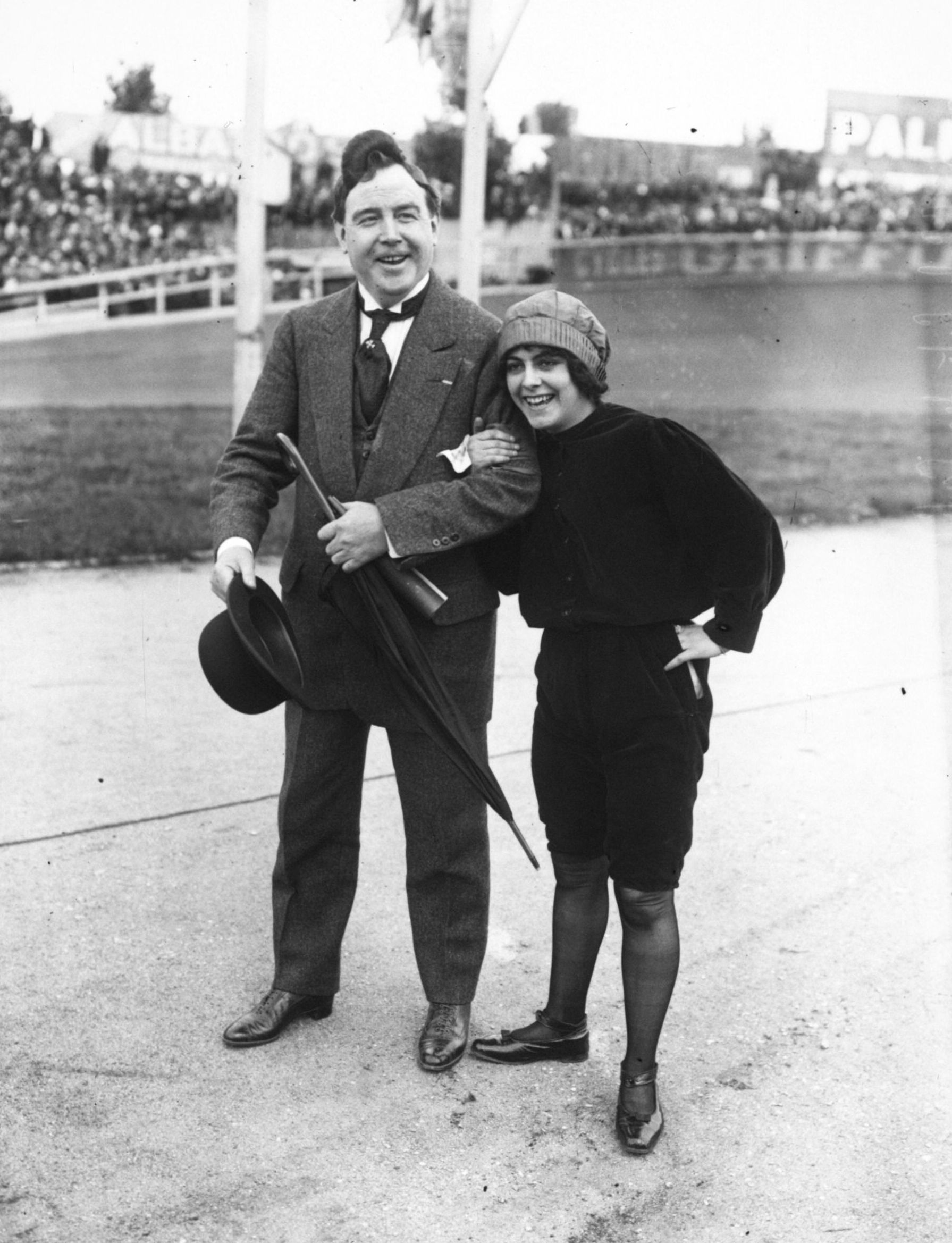
Gaby Morlay in 1912

She was an art lover and was a friend and admirer of the Italian painter Beretta Dimario who lived in Nice.

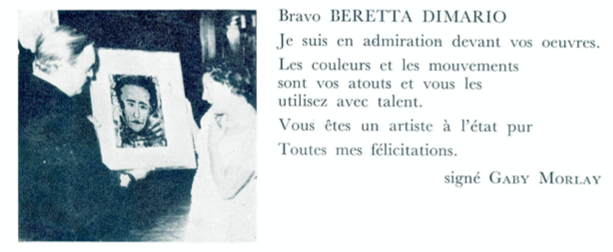
Dedication of Gaby Morlay to the Italian artist Beretta Dimario

== Selected filmography ==
- Le chevalier de Gaby (1920)
- The Agony of the Eagles (1922)
- La mendiante de Saint-Sulpice (1924)
- Montmartre (1925)
- Jim la houlette, roi des voleurs (1926)
- Les Nouveaux Messieurs (1929)
- Ariane, jeune fille russe (1930)
- Accused, Stand Up! (1930)
- When Love Is Over (1931)
- Montmartre (1931)
- Dance Hall (1931)
- Companion Wanted (1932)
- Once Upon a Time (1933)
- The Scandal (1934)
- Jeanne (1934)
- We Are Not Children (1934)
- Le Bonheur (1934)
- Samson (1936)
- The King (1936)
- Nights of Fire (1937)
- A Picnic on the Grass (1937)
- The Messenger (1937)
- Giuseppe Verdi (1938)
- Hercule (1938)
- White Nights in Saint Petersburg (1938)
- Quadrille (1938)
- Sacred Woods (1939)
- Entente cordiale (1939)
- Behind the Facade (1939)
- Paris-New York (1940)
- They Were Twelve Women (1940)
- The Black Diamond (1941)
- The Blue Veil (1942)
- Love Around the Clock (1943)
- White Wings (1943)
- Mademoiselle Béatrice (1943)
- Night Shift (1944)
- Farandole (1945)
- The Last Metro (1945)
- Her Final Role (1946)
- The Lovers of Pont Saint Jean (1947)
- The Lost Village (1947)
- Three Boys, One Girl (1948)
- Gigi (1949)
- Eve and the Serpent (1949)
- Millionaires for One Day (1949)
- Summer Storm (1949)
- Father's Dilemma (1950)
- Without Trumpet or Drum (1950)
- Anna (1951)
- Mammy (1951)
- Good Enough to Eat (1951)
- The Girl with the Whip (1952)
- Le Plaisir (1952)
- The Love of a Woman (1953)
- The Lovers of Marianne (1953)
- Royal Affairs in Versailles (1954)
- Papa, maman, la bonne et moi (1954)
- Papa, maman, ma femme et moi (1955)
- L'impossible Monsieur Pipelet (1955)
- Crime and Punishment (1956)
- Ramuntcho (1959)
- Quay of Illusions (1959)
- Monsieur (1964)
