= List of French films of 1942 =

A list of films produced in France in 1942.

== A–L ==
Title	Director	Cast	Genre	Notes
Annette and the Blonde Woman	Jean Dréville	Henri Garat, Mona Goya, Louise Carletti	Comedy	
L'Arlésienne	Marc Allégret	Raimu, Gaby Morlay, Louis Jourdan	Drama	
At Your Command, Madame	Jean Boyer	Jean Tissier, Suzanne Dehelly, Jacqueline Gauthier	Comedy	
The Beautiful Adventure	Marc Allégret	Claude Dauphin, Micheline Presle, Louis Jourdan	Comedy	
The Benefactor	Henri Decoin	Raimu, Suzy Prim, Pierre Larquey	Crime	
The Blue Veil	Jean Stelli	Gaby Morlay, Elvire Popesco, Fernand Charpin	Drama	
Bolero	Jean Boyer	Arletty, André Luguet, Jacques Dumesnil	Comedy	
Business Is Business	Jean Dréville	Charles Vanel, Aimé Clariond, Jacques Baumer	Drama	
Caprices	Léo Joannon	Danielle Darrieux, Albert Préjean, Jean Parédès	Comedy	
Carmen	Christian-Jaque	Viviane Romance, Jean Marais, Lucien Coëdel	Musical	Co-production with Italy
Chiffon's Wedding	Claude Autant-Lara	Odette Joyeux, André Luguet, Jacques Dumesnil	Comedy	
Colonel Pontcarral	Jean Delannoy	Pierre Blanchar, Annie Ducaux, Suzy Carrier	Historical	
The Crossroads	André Berthomieu	Pierre Richard-Willm, Josette Day, Madeleine Robinson	Drama	
Le Destin fabuleux de Désirée Clary	Sacha Guitry	Jean-Louis Barrault, Gaby Morlay, Aimé Clariond	Historical	
The Duchess of Langeais	Jacques de Baroncelli	Edwige Feuillère, Pierre Richard-Willm, Aimé Clariond	Historical	
Eight Men in a Castle	Richard Pottier	René Dary, Jacqueline Gauthier, Louis Salou	Mystery	
Fantastic Night	Marcel L'Herbier	Micheline Presle, Fernand Gravey, Saturnin Fabre	Fantasy	
Fever	Jean Delannoy	Tino Rossi, Jacqueline Delubac, Ginette Leclerc	Drama	
Frederica	Jean Boyer	Charles Trenet, Elvire Popesco, Jacqueline Gauthier	Comedy	
The Golden Age	Jean de Limur	Elvire Popesco, André Alerme, Jean Tissier	Comedy	
The Guardian Angel	Jacques de Casembroot	Lucien Baroux, Roger Duchesne, Jacques Varennes	Comedy	
Last Adventure	Robert Péguy	Annie Ducaux, Jean-Max, André Alerme	Comedy	
The Law of Spring	Jacques Daniel-Norman	Huguette Duflos, Pierre Renoir, Alice Field	Comedy	
Le Lit à colonnes	Roland Tual	Fernand Ledoux, Michèle Alfa, Odette Joyeux, Jean Marais	Drama	
The Lost Woman	Jean Choux	Renée Saint-Cyr, Jean Murat, Jean Galland	Drama	
Love Letters	Claude Autant-Lara	Odette Joyeux, François Périer, Julien Carette	Drama	
Love Marriage	Henri Decoin	Juliette Faber, François Périer, Paul Meurisse	Comedy	
The Lover of Borneo	René Le Hénaff	Arletty, Jean Tissier, André Alerme	Comedy	

== M–Z ==
Title	Director	Cast	Genre	Notes
Macao	Jean Delannoy	Sessue Hayakawa, Mireille Balin, Henri Guisol	Drama	
Mademoiselle Swing	Richard Pottier	Irène de Trebert, Jean Murat, Elvira Popescu	Musical	
The Man Who Played with Fire	Jean de Limur	Ginette Leclerc, Jacqueline Laurent, Aimé Clariond	Drama	
Men Without Fear	Yvan Noé	Madeleine Sologne, Claude Dauphin, Jean Murat	Drama	
Miss Bonaparte	Maurice Tourneur	Edwige Feuillère, Raymond Rouleau, Monique Joyce	Biopic	
Monsieur La Souris	Georges Lacombe	Raimu, Aimé Clariond, Micheline Francey	Mystery	
The Murderer is Afraid at Night	Jean Delannoy	Mireille Balin, Jean Chevrier, Louise Carletti	Crime	
The Murderer Lives at Number 21	Henri-Georges Clouzot	Suzy Delair, Pierre Fresnay, Noël Roquevert	Mystery	
The Newspaper Falls at Five O'Clock	Georges Lacombe	Pierre Fresnay, Marie Déa, Pierre Renoir	Drama	
No Love Allowed	Richard Pottier	Suzy Delair, Paul Meurisse, Mona Goya	Comedy	
Patricia	Paul Mesnier	Gabrielle Dorziat, Louise Carletti, Georges Grey	Comedy	
Prince Charming	Jean Boyer	Lucien Baroux, Renée Faure, Jimmy Gaillard	Comedy	
Private Life	Walter Kapps	Marie Bell, Jean Galland, Ginette Leclerc	Drama	
Promise to a Stranger	André Berthomieu	Charles Vanel, Claude Dauphin, Madeleine Robinson	Drama	
Return to Happiness	René Jayet	Jules Berry, Suzy Vernon, Gina Manès	Comedy drama	
Romance for Three	Roger Richebé	Fernand Gravey, Simone Renant, Bernard Blier	Comedy	
Room Thirteen	André Hugon	Jules Berry, Josseline Gaël, Robert Le Vigan	Crime	
Sideral Cruises	André Zwobada	Madeleine Sologne, Jean Marchat, Julien Carette	Sci-Fi	
Six Little Girls in White	Yvan Noé	Jean Murat, Janine Darcey, Henri Guisol	Comedy	
The Snow on the Footsteps	André Berthomieu	Pierre Blanchar, Michèle Alfa, Josseline Gaël	Drama	
The Strangers in the House	Henri Decoin	Raimu, Juliette Faber, Jean Tissier	Crime	
The Trump Card	Jacques Becker	Mireille Balin, Raymond Rouleau, Pierre Renoir	Crime	
Twisted Mistress	André Cayatte	Danielle Darrieux, Lise Delamare, Monique Joyce	Comedy	
Les Visiteurs du soir	Marcel Carné	Arletty, Jules Berry, Marie Déa	Fantasy drama	
White Patrol	Christian Chamborant	Sessue Hayakawa, Junie Astor, Paul Azaïs	Thriller	
The Woman I Loved Most	Robert Vernay	Arletty, Mireille Balin, Lucien Baroux	Drama	

== See also ==
- 1942 in France
