= List of French films of 1939 =

A list of films produced in France in 1939:

== A-L ==
Title	Director	Cast	Genre	Notes
Angelica	Jean Choux	Viviane Romance, Georges Flamant, Guillaume de Sax	Adventure	Co-production with Italy
Bach en correctionnelle	Henry Wulschleger	Felix Oudart, Yvonne Yma	Comedy	
Battement de coeur	Henri Decoin	Danielle Darrieux, Claude Dauphin		
Behind the Facade	Georges Lacombe, Yves Mirande	Lucien Baroux, André Lefaur	Drama	
Berlingot and Company	Fernand Rivers	Fernandel, Suzy Prim	Comedy	
Brazza ou l'Epopée du Congo	Léon Poirier	Robert Darène, Odette Barencey		
Campement 13	Jacques Constant	Alice Field, Gabriel Gabrio	Drama	
Case of Conscience	Walter Kapps	Suzy Prim, Jules Berry, Roger Karl	Drama	
Cocoanut	Jean Boyer	Raimu, Marie Bell	Comedy	UFA
The Corsican Brothers	Géo Kelber, Robert Siodmak	Jean Aquistapace, Pierre Brasseur, Lucienne Le Marchand	Drama	
Coups de feu	René Barberis	Mireille Balin, Raymond Rouleau	Comedy drama	
Courrier d'Asie	Oscar-Paul Gilbert			
De Mayerling à Sarajevo	Max Ophüls			
Dédé la musique	André Berthomieu	Albert Préjean, Line Noro		
Deputy Eusèbe	André Berthomieu	Michel Simon, Elvire Popesco, Jules Berry	Comedy	
Dernière Jeunesse	Jeff Musso	Raimu, Pierre Brasseur	Drama	
The Duel	Pierre Fresnay	Yvonne Printemps, Raimu	Drama	
The Duraton Family	Christian Stengel	Noël-Noël, Jules Berry, Blanchette Brunoy	Comedy	
Entente cordiale	Marcel L'Herbier	Gaby Morlay, Victor Francen	Historical	
The End of the Day	Julien Duvivier	Victor Francen, Michel Simon	Drama	
Extenuating Circumstances	Jean Boyer	Arletty, Michel Simon	Comedy	
Face au Destin	Henri Fescourt	Jules Berry, Georges Rigaud	Comedy drama	
The Fatted Calf	Serge de Poligny	Elvire Popesco, André Lefaur		
Fire in the Straw	Jean Benoît-Lévy	Lucien Baroux, Orane Demazis	Drama	
The Five Cents of Lavarede	Maurice Cammage	Fernandel, Josette Day	Comedy	
Fort Dolorès	René Le Hénaff	Roger Karl, Gina Manès	Western	
Fric-Frac	Maurice Lehmann, Claude Autant-Lara			
Girls in Distress	Georg Wilhelm Pabst	Marcelle Chantal, Micheline Presle, André Luguet	Drama	
Goodbye Vienna	Jacques Séverac	Gustav Fröhlich, Lee Parry, Rolla Norman	Musical	
Grandfather	Robert Péguy	Pierre Larquey, Josseline Gaël, Milly Mathis	Comedy drama	
Grey contre X	Pierre Maudru, Alfred Gragnon		Crime	
His Uncle from Normandy	Jean Dréville	Josseline Gaël, Jules Berry, Betty Stockfeld	Comedy	
Immediate Call	Léon Mathot	Mireille Balin, Roger Duchesne	Comedy drama	
Latin Quarter	Pierre Colombier, Christian Chamborant, Alexander Esway	Bernard Lancret, Blanchette Brunoy, Junie Astor	Comedy	
L'Embuscade	Fernand Rivers	Michele Verly, Poupon	Drama	
L'Émigrante	Léo Joannon	Edwige Feuillère, Jean Chevrier	Comedy	
L’empreinte du dieu	Léonide Moguy	Pierre Larquey, Pierre Blanchar		
L'étrange nuit de Noël	Yvan Noé	Sylvia Bataille, André Brulé		
L'héritier des Mondésir	Albert Valentin	Fernandel, Elvire Popesco	Comedy	French/German co-production
L'Homme du Niger	Jacques de Baroncelli	Harry Baur, Victor Francen		
L'Homme qui cherche la vérité	Alexander Esway	Raimu, Yvette Lebon	Drama	
L'intrigante	Emile Couzinet	Paul Cambo, Germaine Aussey		
L'Or du Cristobal	Jean Stelli, Jacques Becker	Charles Vanel, Conchita Montenegro		
La boutique aux illusions	Jacques Séverac	Jim Gerald, Mary Serta	Comedy	
La Loi du nord	Jacques Feyder	Michèle Morgan	Adventure drama	1 nomination
Le Café du port	Jean Choux	René Dary, Line Viala		
Le chemin de l'honneur	Jean-Paul Paulin	Henri Garat, Roland Toutain	Drama	
Le club des fadas	Émile Couzinet	Fernand Charpin, Odette Roger		
Le Danube bleu	Emil-Edwin Reinert, Alfred Rode			
Le Dernier Tournant	Pierre Chenal	Fernand Gravey, Michel Simon	Drama	
Le déserteur	Léonide Moguy	Jean-Pierre Aumont, Corinne Luchaire		
Le feu de paille	Jean Benoît-Lévy	Lucien Baroux, Orane Demaziz	Drama	
Le grand élan	Christian-Jaque	Max Dearly, Jean Tissier		
Le Jour se lève	Marcel Carné	Jean Gabin, Arletty	Crime drama	1 nomination
Le monde en armes	Jean Oser			
Le paradis des voleurs	L. C. Marsoudet	Paulette Dubost, Roland Toutain	Comedy	
Le président haudecœr	Jean Dréville	Harry Baur, Betty Stockfeld		
Le roi des galéjeurs	Fernand Rivers	Henri Albert, Claude May		
Les Compagnons	Saint-Hubert de Jean Georgesco			
Les gangsters du château d'If	René Pujol	Pierre Larquey, Germaine Roger		
Les musiciens du ciel	Georges Lacombe	Michèle Morgan, Michel Simon		
Les trois tambours	Maurice de Canonge	Jean Yonnel, Madeleine Soria	Drama	
Louise	Abel Gance	Grace Moore, Grace Thill	Musical	Screened at the 1987 Cannes Film Festival

== M-Z ==
Title	Director	Cast	Genre	Notes
Marseille mes amours	Jacques Daniel-Norman	Leon Belieres, Reda Caire		
The Mayor's Dilemma	Raymond Bernard	Annie Vernay, Saturnin Fabre, Fernand Charpin	Drama	
Menaces	Edmond T. Gréville	Mireille Balin, John Loder		
Metropolitan	Maurice Cam	Albert Préjean, Ginette Leclerc	Thriller	
Midnight Tradition	Roger Richebé	Viviane Romance, Georges Flamant, Marcel Dalio	Crime thriller	
Monsieur Brotonneau	Alexander Esway	Raimu, Josette Day, Marguerite Pierry	Comedy drama	
Monsieur le maire	Jacques Séverac	George Maurer, Leonie Bussinger		
My Aunt the Dictator	René Pujol	Marguerite Moreno, Armand Bernard, Fernand Charpin	Comedy	
Nadia la femme traquée	Claude Orval			
Nine Bachelors	Sacha Guitry	Sacha Guitry, Max Dearly	Comedy	
Night in December	Curtis Bernhardt	Pierre Blanchar, Renée Saint-Cyr	Drama	
The Path of Honour	Jean-Paul Paulin	Henri Garat, Renée Saint-Cyr, André Lefaur	Drama	
Personal Column	Robert Siodmak	Maurice Chevalier, Marie Déa, Pierre Renoir	Drama	
The Phantom Carriage	Julien Duvivier	Pierre Fresnay, Micheline Francey, Marie Bell	Romance	
Place de la Concorde	Karel Lamac	Albert Préjean, Armand Bernard, René Lefèvre	Comedy	
The Porter from Maxim's	Maurice Cammage	Bach, Genevieve Callix	Comedy	
Pour le maillot jaune	Jean Stelli	Albert Préjean, René Génin		
Prince Bouboule	Jacques Houssin	Georges Milton, Irén Zilahy, Michèle Alfa	Comedy	
Quartier sans soleil	Dimitri Kirsanoff			
Raphaël le tatoué	Christian-Jaque Sortie	Fernandel	Comedy	
Remorques	Jean Grémillon	Jean Gabin, Michèle Morgan	Drama	
Sacred Woods	Léon Mathot	Elvire Popesco, Gaby Morlay	Comedy	
The Rules of the Game	Jean Renoir	Nora Gregor	Comedy drama	Won Bodil Award
Saturnin de Yvan Noé				
Savage Brigade	Marcel L'Herbier	Véra Korène, Charles Vanel, Florence Marly	Drama	
Serenade	Jean Boyer	Lilian Harvey, Louis Jouvet	Historical	
Serge Panine	Charles Méré	Françoise Rosay, Pierre Renoir	Drama	
Sidi-Brahim, les diables bleu	Marc Didier	René Dary, Colette Darfeuil		
Sixième Étage	Maurice Cloche	Janine Darcey, Alice Tissot		
The Spirit of Sidi-Brahim	Marc Didier	René Dary, Colette Darfeuil, Abel Jacquin	Spy drama	
Sur le plancher des vaches	Pierre-Jean Ducis	Noël-Noël, Raymond Cordy		
Tempête	Bernard Deschamps	Arletty, Marcel Dalio		
Thérèse Martin	Maurice de Canonge	Irène Corday, Marthe Mellot, Lucien Gallas	Drama	
There's No Tomorrow	Max Ophüls	Edwige Feuillère, Jorge Rigaud	Drama	
Three from St Cyr	Jean-Paul Paulin	Roland Toutain, Jean Mercanton, Jean Chevrier	Adventure	
Three Hours	Léonide Moguy	Jean-Pierre Aumont, Corinne Luchaire	War drama	
Une main a frappé	Gaston Roudès			
Unknown of Monte Carlo	André Berthomieu	Dita Parlo, Albert Préjean	Drama	Co-production with Italy
Veillée d'amour	John M. Stahl	Onslow Stevens, Nydia Westman		
Vidocq	Jacques Daroy	André Brulé, Nadine Vogel	Historical	
Whirlwind of Paris	Henri Diamant-Berger	Ray Ventura, Fernand Charpin	Musical comedy	
The White Slave	Marc Sorkin	Viviane Romance, John Lodge, Marcel Dalio	Drama	
The World Will Tremble	Richard Pottier	Claude Dauphin, Madeleine Sologne, Erich von Stroheim	Science Fiction	
Yamilé dans les cèdres	Charles d'Espinay			

== See also ==
- 1939 in France
