= Jean Brochard =

French actor (1893–1972)

- Born: 12 March 1893; Nantes, France
- Died: 17 June 1972 (aged 79); Nantes, France
- Occupation: Actor
- Years active: 1933–1966

Jean Brochard (French pronunciation: [ʒɑ̃ bʁɔʃaʁ]; 12 March 1893 – 17 June 1972) was a French film actor. He appeared in more than 100 films between 1933 and 1966.

== Selected filmography ==
- A Man's Neck (1933) - Petit rôle (uncredited)
- Boubouroche (1933)
- The Invisible Woman (1933)
- Son autre amour (1934)
- Une femme chipée (1934)
- Minuit, place Pigalle (1934)
- Le diable en bouteille (1935)
- The Scandalous Couple (1935) - Un ouvrier
- Un soir de bombe (1935)
- Le secret de l'émeraude (1935) - Le sergent Irving
- Jonny, haute-couture (1935)
- Inspector Grey (1936) - L'inspecteur Poussin
- Bach the Detective (1936) - Le voyageur indisposé
- Tout va très bien madame la marquise (1936)
- The Mysterious Lady (1936)
- À minuit, le 7 (1937) - L'inspecteur Belenfant
- Vous n'avez rien à déclarer ? (1937) - Le balayeur
- À nous deux, madame la vie (1937)
- Champs-Elysees (1937) - Un agent
- The Cheat (1937) - Félicien
- Ma petite marquise (1937) - Godard
- Grey's Thirteenth Investigation (1937) - L'inspecteur Poussin
- The Two Schemers (1938)
- Ramuntcho (1938) - Boulinguet
- Monsieur Breloque Has Disappeared (1938)
- La Piste du sud (1938) - Adjudant Soulier
- Captain Benoit (1938) - Mercadier
- Raphaël le tatoué (1939) - Le commissaire
- The White Slave (1939) - Le chef électricien (uncredited)
- Vidocq (1939) - Fanfan, le forçat repenti
- Nord-Atlantique (1939) - Daauphin - le patron
- Entente cordiale (1939) - Le valet
- Midnight Tradition (1939) - Le commissaire (uncredited)
- Berlingot and Company (1939) - Le directeur de l'asile
- The Corsican Brothers (1939) - Le gendarme
- Ultima giovinezza (1939) - Il proprietario del ristorante
- Dernière Jeunesse (1939) - Le patron du restaurant
- La Loi du Nord (1939) - Urghard
- Personal Column (1939) - Le speaker
- Quartier sans soleil (1939) - Auguste
- Paradise Lost (1940) - Un soldat (uncredited)
- Miquette (1940)
- Bach en correctionnelle (1940) - L'agent de police
- L'enfer des anges (1941) - M. Petitot, le philatéliste
- Hopes (1941)
- The Acrobat (1941) - Le commissaire
- First Ball (1941) - Thomas
- Who Killed Santa Claus? (1942) - Ricomet
- Caprices (1942) - Le 'père'
- The Newspaper Falls at Five O'Clock (1942) - Meulon dit Borniol
- Les Roquevillard (1943) - Philippeaux
- Le Corbeau (1943) - Bonnevi - le trésorier de l'hôpital
- The Man from London (1943) - L'inspecteur Mollison
- Voyage Without Hope (1943) - L'inspecteur Chapelin
- Traveling Light (1944) - Marcel Berthier
- Cecile Is Dead (1944) - Dandurand
- The Ménard Collection (1944) - Le guide
- Carmen (1944) - Lillas-Pastia
- Coup de tête (1944) - Le financier Brussac (uncredited)
- Vingt-quatre heures de perm (1945) - Le caporal
- Secret Documents (1945)
- The Great Pack (1945) - Maître Marvault
- Boule de Suif (1945) - Auguste Loiseau
- The Last Judgment (1945) - Svodoba
- Jericho (1946) - Michaud
- A Lover's Return (1946) - Jérôme Nisard
- Le bateau à soupe (1946) - Le recruteur
- The Royalists (1947) - Marche-à-Terre
- La femme en rouge (1947) - Le commissaire
- La Maison sous la mer (1947) - Quoniam
- The Eleven O'Clock Woman (1948) - Le juge d'instruction
- La Carcasse et le Tord-cou (1948) - Me Souquet
- Clochemerle (1948) - Piéchut
- Night Express (1948) - L'inspecteur Verdier
- Wench (1948) - Rabasse
- Five Red Tulips (1949) - L'inspecteur-chef Honoré Ricoul
- Barry (1949) - Philémon Cavazza
- Return to Life (1949) - L'hôtelier (segment 3 : "Le retour de Jean")
- Mademoiselle de La Ferté (1949) - Monsieur Larald
- Vient de paraître (1949) - Brégaillon
- Millionaires for One Day (1949) - Pierre Berger
- Sending of Flowers (1950) - Hippolyte
- Bed for Two; Rendezvous with Luck (1950) - M. Gauffre
- God Needs Men (1950) - L'abbé Kerhervé, le recteur de Lescoff
- Under the Sky of Paris (1951) - Jules Hermenault
- Dr. Knock (1951) - Docteur Albert Parpalaid
- Passion (1951) - Le directeur de la prison
- The Voyage to America (1951) - Le maire
- Tapage nocturne (1951) - Frédéric Varescot
- La forêt de l'adieu (1952) - Edouard Queyrian
- Monsieur Taxi (1952) - Oncle Léon
- Crimson Curtain (1952) - L'inspecteur en chef
- Cent ans de gloire (1952)
- Quintuplets in the Boarding School (1953) - Florentin
- Capitaine Pantoufle (1953) - Monsieur Lesurpied
- I Vitelloni (1953) - Francesco Moretti
- The Lady of the Camellias (1953) - Le notaire
- Piédalu député (1954) - Coldagneau
- The Lovers of Marianne (1954) - Le chef-compatible Jean Berton
- Les Diaboliques (1955) - Plantiveau, le concierge
- L'impossible Monsieur Pipelet (1955) - Monsieur Richet
- Scandal in Montmartre (1955) - Le commissaire Alphandri
- Thirteen at the Table (1955) - Dr. Pelourzat
- Le secret de soeur Angèle (1956) - Le speaker
- Les mains liées (1956) - Dr. Diriart
- The Virtuous Bigamist (1956) - Le commerçant dans le car
- I'll Get Back to Kandara (1956) - Le juge d'instruction
- Ah, quelle équipe! (1957) - Le prêtre
- Les violents (1957) - Bernard Chartrain
- Les Espions (1957) - Le surveillant-général
- Lovers of Paris (1957) - Duveyrier
- Sinners of Paris (1958) - Le commissaire divisionnaire Brevet, de la P.J.
- The Law Is the Law (1958) - Le député
- La bête à l'affût (1959) - Commissaire François
- An Angel on Wheels (1959) - Le père de Line
- The Enigma of the Folies-Bergere (1959)
- Way of Youth (1959) - Monsieur Coutelier
- À pleines mains (1960) - Le commissaire Marsay
