= The Eternal Return (film) =

- Directed by: Jean Delannoy
- Written by: Jean Cocteau
- Produced by: André Paulvé
- Starring: Madeleine Sologne; Jean Marais; Jean Murat
- Cinematography: Roger Hubert
- Edited by: Suzanne Fauvel
- Music by: Georges Auric
- Production company: Films André Paulvé
- Distributed by: DisCina (France); Eagle-Lion (United States)
- Release date: 13 October 1943
- Running time: 107 minutes
- Country: France
- Language: French

The Eternal Return (French: L'Éternel retour) is a 1943 French romantic drama film directed by Jean Delannoy and starring Madeleine Sologne and Jean Marais. The screenplay was written by Jean Cocteau as a retelling of Tristan and Isolde set in contemporary France. In the United Kingdom, the film was released in 1946 by Eagle-Lion Distributors under the alternative title Love Eternal.

It was made at the Victorine Studios in Nice with sets designed by the art director Georges Wakhévitch. The film's costumes were by Georges Annenkov. Location shooting took place at the Chateau de Pesteils in Polminhac. It premiered in Vichy and was one of the greatest commercial hits of the occupation period.

== Cast ==
- Madeleine Sologne as Nathalie, the blonde
- Jean Marais as Patrice
- Jean Murat as Marc
- Junie Astor as Nathalie, the brunette
- Roland Toutain as Lionel
- Jane Marken as Anne
- Jean d'Yd as Amédée Frossin
- Piéral as Achille Frossin
- Yvonne de Bray as Gertrude Frossin
- Alexandre Rignault as Morholt

== Bibliography ==
- Lanzoni, Rémi Fournier. French Cinema: From Its Beginnings to the Present. A&C Black, 2004.
