= Secrets (1943 film) =

1943 film

- Directed by: Pierre Blanchar
- Written by: Bernard Zimmer
- Based on: A Month in the Country by Ivan Turgenev
- Produced by: Ferdinand Liffran; Adrien Remaugé; Christian Stengel
- Starring: Pierre Blanchar; Marie Déa; Jacques Dumesnil
- Cinematography: Christian Matras
- Edited by: Roger Mercanton
- Music by: Arthur Honegger
- Production company: Pathé Consortium Cinéma
- Distributed by: Pathé Consortium Cinéma
- Release date: 17 March 1943
- Running time: 100 minutes
- Country: France
- Language: French

Secrets is a 1943 French comedy drama film directed by and starring Pierre Blanchar alongside Marie Déa, Jacques Dumesnil and Marguerite Moreno. The film's sets were designed by the art director Jean Perrier. It is based on the play A Month in the Country by Ivan Turgenev.

== Cast ==
- Pierre Blanchar as René
- Marie Déa as Marie-Thérèse
- Jacques Dumesnil as Pierre
- Carlettina as Pitou
- Marguerite Moreno as Madame Auguste
- Suzy Carrier as Claire
- Gilbert Gil as Michel Aylias
- Auguste Mouriès as Le docteur
- Madeleine Geoffroy as Agathe
- Eugène Chevalier as Vincent
- Max Dalban as Monsieur Amadou
- Geneviève Morel as Magali

== Bibliography ==
- Bessy, Maurice & Chirat, Raymond. Histoire du cinéma français: encyclopédie des films, 1940–1950. Pygmalion, 1986
- Goble, Alan. The Complete Index to Literary Sources in Film. Walter de Gruyter, 1999.
- Rège, Philippe. Encyclopedia of French Film Directors, Volume 1. Scarecrow Press, 2009.
