= Conflict (1938 film) =

1938 film

- Theatrical release poster
- Directed by: Léonide Moguy
- Written by: Charles Gombault; Léonide Moguy; Hans Wilhelm
- Based on: Dark Angel; 1934 novel by Gina Kaus
- Produced by: Arnold Pressburger; Ernest Rupp; André Paulvé; Bernard Natan
- Starring: Corinne Luchaire; Annie Ducaux; Armand Bernard
- Cinematography: André Bac; Theodore J. Pahle
- Edited by: Borys Lewin
- Music by: Jacques Ibert; Wal-Berg
- Production company: Compagnie Internationale de Productions Cinématographiques (CIPRA)
- Distributed by: Societé Parisienne de Distribution Cinématographique; DisCina
- Release date: 21 December 1938
- Running time: 94 minutes
- Country: France
- Language: French

Conflict (French: Conflit) is a 1938 French drama film directed by Léonide Moguy, who co-wrote the screenplay with Hans Wilhelm and Charles Gombault (dialogue), based on the novel Die Schwestern Kleh by Gina Kaus. It stars Corinne Luchaire, Annie Ducaux, Marguerite Pierry and Armand Bernard.

The film's sets were designed by the art directors Maurice Colasson and Georges Wakhévitch.

== Cast ==
- Corinne Luchaire as Claire
- Annie Ducaux as Catherine Lafont
- Claude Dauphin as Gérard
- Raymond Rouleau as Michel Lafont
- Armand Bernard as Le greffier / Secretary
- Roger Duchesne as Robert
- Marcel Dalio as L'usurier / The Money-Lender
- Pauline Carton as Pauline
- Marguerite Pierry as Marguerite Angel

== Bibliography ==
- Goble, Alan. The Complete Index to Literary Sources in Film. Walter de Gruyter, 1999.
