= Pierre Labry =

French actor

- Born: 14 December 1885; Paris, France
- Died: 23 June 1948 (aged 62); Paris, France
- Occupation: Actor
- Years active: 1920-1948 (film)

Pierre Labry (1885–1948) was a French stage and film actor. He was active in the French film industry between 1920 and 1948, appearing in more than a hundred films.

== Selected filmography ==
- La croisade (1920)
- Gigolette (1921)
- The Crime of Bouif (1922) - Hexam
- L'enfant des halles (1924) - Marcadion
- Le loup-garou (1924)
- L'heureuse mort (1925) - Le Capitaine Mouche
- Mylord l'Arsouille (1925) - Pépin
- Paris in Five Days (1926) - L'Américain
- Feu! (1927) - Un marin du yacht
- L'occident (1928) - Le Goff
- Trois jeunes filles nues (1929)
- The Road Is Fine (1930) - Le client de la guinguette
- La femme d'une nuit (1930)
- Le joker (1930)
- Mon coeur incognito (1930)
- The Lovers of Midnight (1931) - Le policier
- The Indictment (1931) - Peters
- English As It Is Spoken (1931)
- Make a Living (1931)
- Lilac (1932) - Charignoul
- Wooden Crosses (1932) - Soldat Bouffioux, le cuistot
- Aces of the Turf (1932)
- In the Name of the Law (1932) - Ludovic
- The Dressmaker of Luneville (1932)
- Fun in the Barracks (1932) - Potiron
- Narcotics (1932) - Le docteur (uncredited)
- Panurge (1932)
- One Night's Song (1933) - L'inspecteur
- Rivaux de la piste (1933) - Wagmüller
- Don Quixote (1933) - Innkeeper
- The Star of Valencia (1933) - José
- Once Upon a Time (1933)
- La mille et deuxième nuit (1933) - Chief Eunuch
- Un certain monsieur Grant (1933) - Beppo
- Du haut en bas (1933) - Adolf, le fiancé de Milly
- Street Without a Name (1934) - Minche
- A Man Has Been Stolen (1934) - Balafre
- Le Grand Jeu (1934) - Le cantinier
- Cease Firing (1934) - Lagasse
- Pension Mimosas (1935) - L'hôtelier parisien
- Bibi-la-Purée (1935)
- Aux portes de Paris (1935) - Léopold
- The Decoy (1935) - Le commandant
- Le baron tzigane (1935)
- The Mascot (1935) - L'aubergiste
- Les yeux noirs (1935) - Le noceur
- Madame Angot's Daughter (1935) - Buteux
- The Crew (1935) - Marbot
- Carnival in Flanders (1935) - L'aubergiste / The Inn-Keeper
- Les mutinés de l'Elseneur (1936)
- The Volga Boatman (1936) - Kouproff
- Anne-Marie (1936) - Le paysan
- La Peur (1936) - Poudroux
- Confessions of a Cheat (1936) - Maître Morlot / The Notary
- Les gais lurons (1936) - Barman
- Forty Little Mothers (1936) - Bourgeon, le père
- Wells in Flames (1937) - Le marchand de melons
- La chanson du souvenir (1937)
- Gribouille (1937) - L'inspecteur de police (uncredited)
- Lady Killer (1937) - L'imprimeur
- Passeurs d'hommes (1937) - Goliath
- The Alibi (1937) - Le premier inspecteur
- The Puritan (1938)
- Mollenard (1938)
- The Postmaster's Daughter (1938) - Stable Boy
- People Who Travel (1938)
- Boys' School (1938) - Bernardin
- Alexis, Gentleman Chauffeur (1938) - Un acteur
- Sirocco (1938) - Le chef de la bande
- Katia (1938) - Le sergent de police
- Angelica (1939) - L'officier
- The Five Cents of Lavarede (1939) - Le gardien chef
- The Mayor's Dilemma (1939) - Rameau, le coiffeur
- Entente cordiale (1939) - Un journaliste
- The Last Turning (1939) - Un camionneur
- Second Childhood (1939) - Le patron du café
- Love Cavalcade (1939) - Le baron de Maupré
- Personal Column (1939) - Le danseur (uncredited)
- Tourbillon de Paris (1939)
- Les 3 tambours (1939) - Le boulanger Laporte
- Après Mein Kampf mes crimes (1940) - Ernst Roehm
- The Acrobat (1941) - Dubier
- The Last of the Six (1941) - L'inspecteur Picard (uncredited)
- Montmartre (1941) - Le cafetier
- Caprices (1942) - Le portier de l'Imperator
- Pension Jonas (1942) - Mouche
- The Newspaper Falls at Five O'Clock (1942) - Romain (uncredited)
- The Guardian Angel (1942) - Jaminet
- The Lost Woman (1942) - Le cabaretier
- At Your Command, Madame (1942) - Le mécanicien-chef
- Les Visiteurs du Soir (1942) - Le seigneur
- It Happened at the Inn (1943) - Minain
- Captain Fracasse (1943) - Hérode / Erodo
- Shop Girls of Paris (1943) - Achille Vingard - Le serrurier (uncredited)
- Arlette and Love (1943) - Jules - le domestique
- Jeannou (1943)
- Vautrin (1943) - Paccard
- Mahlia the Mestiza (1943)
- Farandole (1945)
- The Bellman (1945) - Gros-Guillaume - l'aubergiste
- The Last Penny (1946) - Le luthier
- The Misfortunes of Sophie (1946)
- Monsieur Grégoire Escapes (1946) - L'aubergiste
- Trente et quarante (1946) - Le maître-nageur
- The Queen's Necklace (1946) - Hubert (uncredited)
- Devil and the Angel (1946) - Gardel - un Inspecteur
- Les gosses mènent l'enquête (1947) - Fiellat
- Passionnelle (1947) - Le brigadier
- Something to Sing About (1947) - L'agent
- The Adventures of Casanova (1947) - Le moine
- The Unknown Singer (1947) - Le machiniste
- Fantômas (1947) - M. Paul
- The Idol (1948) - Bender
- Clochemerle (1948) - Nicolas
- Emile the African (1948) - Le patron
- The Pretty Miller Girl (1948) - Le cocher (uncredited)
- L'échafaud peut attendre (1949) - Le patron du café (final film role)

== Bibliography ==
- Capua, Michelangelo. Anatole Litvak: The Life and Films. McFarland, 2015.
