= Foolish Husbands =

1941 film directed by Marcel L'Herbier

- Directed by: Marcel L'Herbier
- Written by: Georges Neveux; Marcel L'Herbier; Armand Salacrou
- Based on: Histoire de rire by Armand Salacrou
- Produced by: André Paulvé; Georges Lampin
- Starring: Fernand Gravey; Marie Déa; Micheline Presle; Pierre Renoir
- Cinematography: Roger Hubert
- Music by: Marius-François Gaillard
- Production company: DisCina
- Distributed by: DisCina
- Release date: 19 December 1941
- Running time: 117 minutes
- Country: France
- Language: French

Foolish Husbands (French: Histoire de rire) is a 1941 French comedy film directed by Marcel L'Herbier and starring Fernand Gravey, Marie Déa, Micheline Presle and Pierre Renoir. It is based on a 1939 play of the same title by Armand Salacrou. The film's sets were designed by the art director Robert Gys.

== Cast ==
- Fernand Gravey as Gérard Barbier
- Marie Déa as Hélène Donaldo
- Micheline Presle as Adélaïde Barbier
- Pierre Renoir as Jules Donaldo
- Bernard Lancret as Jean-Louis Deshayes
- Gilbert Gil as Achille Ballorson
- Monique Rolland as Coco d'Antibes
- Maurice Mosnier as Joseph
- Gustave Gallet as Maisnier

== Bibliography ==
- Bessy, Maurice & Chirat, Raymond. (1986) Histoire du cinéma français: encyclopédie des films, 1940–1950. Pygmalion
- Rège, Philippe. (20090 Encyclopedia of French Film Directors, Volume 1. Scarecrow Press. Page 639.
