= Farewell Mister Grock =

1950 film

- Directed by: Pierre Billon
- Written by: Christian-Falaize; Nino Constantini
- Produced by: Christian-Falaize; Nino Constantini; André Paulvé
- Starring: Grock; Suzy Prim; Charles Lemontier
- Cinematography: Nikolai Toporkoff
- Edited by: Maurice Serein
- Music by: Henri Sauguet
- Production companies: Le Trident Films; Merkur-Film
- Distributed by: DisCina; Herzog-Filmverleih
- Release date: 19 January 1950
- Running time: 107 minutes
- Countries: France; West Germany
- Languages: French; German

Farewell Mister Grock (French: Au revoir M. Grock, German: Manege frei) is a 1950 French–West German comedy drama film directed by Pierre Billon and starring Grock, Suzy Prim and Charles Lemontier. It is in the tradition of circus films. It was shot at the Francoeur Studios in Paris and on location at the Cirque Medrano and the Théâtre Pigalle in the city as well as around Lake Constance on the Swiss-German border. The film's sets were designed by the art directors Max Mellin and Serge Piménoff. It is also known by the alternative title Clear the Ring.

== Synopsis ==
The film serves a biographical film of the career of the circus clown Adrien Wettach, known by his stage name of Grock, who plays himself against the backdrop of the wars and upheavals of the twentieth century. His interactions with the admiring Russian Countess Barinoff are also portrayed.

== Cast ==
- Grock as Adrien Wettach, alias Grock
- Suzy Prim as Countess Barinoff
- Charles Lemontier as Mr Durand
- Héléna Manson as Aunt Pauline
- Maurice Regamey as Bourquaint
- Nadine Rousseau as Miss Wettach
- Georges Chamarat as Le pere Wattach
- Marcel Pérès as Fracassa
- Monique Marquenet as Adélaïde
- Made Siamé as a waitress
- Louis de Funès as a spectator
- Alexandre Mihalesco as Le clown Auguste
- Ted Rémy as Adrien
- Henry Cassidy as Self
- Peter Graham as Lord Peter
- Axel Scholtz as Kurt Heller
- Jean-Jacques Domenge as Jeannot
- Paul Oettly as Wittzec
- Philipp Gruß as Roberto Wittez / Wetzel
- Camille Gari as Roberta
- Alfonso Bovino as Italian child

== Bibliography ==
- Ainsworth, Adam, Double, Oliver & Peacock, Louise. Popular Performance. Bloomsbury Publishing, 2017.
- Cullen, Frank, Hackman, Florence & McNeilly, Donald. Vaudeville old & new: an encyclopedia of variety performances in America. Psychology Press, 2007.
