= The Sharks of Gibraltar =

1947 film directed by Emil E. Reinert

- Directed by: Emil E. Reinert
- Written by: Norbert Carbonnaux; Jacques Companéez; Ernst Neubach
- Produced by: Michel Safra; André Paulvé
- Starring: Annie Ducaux; Louis Salou; Yves Vincent
- Cinematography: Robert Lefebvre
- Edited by: Victoria Mercanton
- Music by: Alain Romans
- Production company: DisCina
- Distributed by: DisCina
- Release date: 14 November 1947
- Running time: 102 minutes
- Country: France
- Language: French

The Sharks of Gibraltar (French: Les requins de Gibraltar) is a 1947 French spy thriller film directed by Emil E. Reinert and starring Annie Ducaux, Louis Salou and Yves Vincent.

== Cast ==
- Annie Ducaux as Stella
- Louis Salou as Gordon
- Yves Vincent as André Duval
- Jacques Berthier as Le lieutenant David Brooks
- Geneviève Aumont]
- Roland Bailly as Un espion
- Clément Bairam
- Robert Balpo as Le cabaretier
- André Brunot as Colonel Becker
- Lucien Callamand as Le président
- Emilio Carrer
- Henri Crémieux as Evans
- Jo Dest as William Jones
- Pierre Dudan as Louis
- Claude Farell
- Richard Flagey]
- Roger Gaillard as L'accusateur
- Marcelle Géniat as Tante Marguerite
- Pierre Magnier as Oncle Carters
- Roger Rafal as Faormoe
- Jean Vilar as Percy Carters
- Jean Yonnel

== See also ==
- Gibraltar (1938)
- Gibraltar (1964)

== Bibliography ==
- Alberca, Julio Ponce. Gibraltar and the Spanish Civil. Bloomsbury Publishing, 2015. ISBN 978-1-4725-3312-8.
- Rège, Philippe. Encyclopedia of French Film Directors, Volume 1. Scarecrow Press, 2009. ISBN 978-0-8108-6939-4.
