= Third at Heart =

1947 film

- Directed by: Jacques de Casembroot
- Written by: Marc-Gilbert Sauvajon
- Produced by: Jean Mugeli
- Starring: Georges Grey; Sophie Desmarets; Henri Guisol
- Cinematography: Nikolai Toporkoff
- Music by: Georges Van Parys
- Production company: Union Cinématographique Lyonnaise
- Distributed by: Filmsonor
- Release date: 10 December 1947
- Running time: 85 minutes
- Country: France
- Language: French

Third at Heart (French: Tierce à coeur) is a 1947 French comedy film directed by Jacques de Casembroot and starring Georges Grey, Sophie Desmarets and Henri Guisol.

== Cast ==
- Georges Grey as Jérôme de Latour Martin
- Henri Guisol as Jasmin
- Sophie Desmarets as Gaby
- Paul Amiot as Le président du tribunal
- Jacqueline Porel as Dina
- Pauline Carton as Marguerite
- Francine Claudel as Lorraine
- Henri de Livry as Le livreur
- Albert Michel as Bastien

== Bibliography ==
- Rège, Philippe . Encyclopedia of French Film Directors, Volume 1. Scarecrow Press, 2009.
