= Flesh and the Woman =

1954 film

- Film poster
- Directed by: Robert Siodmak
- Written by: Jacques Feyder; Charles Spaak
- Produced by: André Paulvé; Angelo Rizzoli; Michel Safra
- Starring: Gina Lollobrigida
- Cinematography: Michel Kelber
- Edited by: Victoria Mercanton
- Music by: Maurice Thiriet; Georges Van Parys
- Distributed by: Cinédis
- Release date: 12 April 1954
- Running time: 100 minutes
- Countries: France; Italy
- Language: French

Flesh and the Woman (French: Le Grand Jeu) is a 1954 French-Italian drama film directed by Robert Siodmak. It was entered into the 1954 Cannes Film Festival. It was released in the USA under the title Flesh and the Woman, and in the UK as The Card of Fate. It is a remake of the 1934 film Le Grand Jeu.

== Plot ==
After an affair with a young woman named Sylvia the Frenchman Pierre Martel leaves Paris and goes to Algeria because he wants to start over. His wife refuses to follow him. Dismayed about all this he decides to join the French Foreign Legion. As a soldier he runs into a look-alike of Sylvia.

== Cast ==
- Gina Lollobrigida as Sylvia Sorrego / Helena Ricci
- Jean-Claude Pascal as Pierre Martel
- Arletty as Blanche
- Raymond Pellegrin as Mario
- Peter van Eyck as Fred
- Jean Témerson as Xavier Noblet
- Jean Hébey as Brigadier
- Paul Amiot as the capitain
- Odette Barencey as Gertrude
- Charles Bayard
- Gérard Buhr as a legionnaire
- Jo Dest as the bistro keeper
- Leila Farida as Aïcha
- Gabrielle Fontan as the sister
- Lila Kedrova as Rose
- Odette Laure as Mario's girl-friend
- Darling Légitimus
- Margo Lion as the cleaner
- Alix Mahieux as Mado
- Umberto Melnati
- Bernard Musson as the painter
- Marcel Rouzé as the receptionist
- Roger Vincent as the hotel keeper
- Georges Vitray
