= First Ball =

1941 film

- Directed by: Christian-Jaque
- Written by: Charles Spaak
- Produced by: André Paulvé
- Starring: Marie Déa; Fernand Ledoux; Raymond Rouleau
- Cinematography: Roger Hubert
- Edited by: Yvonne Martin
- Music by: Georges Van Parys
- Production company: Films André Paulvé
- Distributed by: DisCina
- Release date: 17 September 1941
- Running time: 100 minutes
- Country: France
- Language: French

First Ball (French: Premier bal) is a 1941 French romantic comedy film directed by Christian-Jaque and starring Marie Déa, Fernand Ledoux and Raymond Rouleau. It was shot at the Saint-Maurice Studios in Paris. The film's sets were designed by the art director René Renoux.

== Cast ==
- Marie Déa as Nicole Noblet
- Fernand Ledoux as Michel Noblet
- Raymond Rouleau as Jean de Lormel
- Gaby Sylvia as Danielle Noblet
- François Périer as Ernest Vilar
- Gabrielle Fontan as Marie
- Jean Brochard as Thomas
- Bernard Blier as Le maitre d'hôtel
- Charles Granval as De Lormel, père
- Marcel Maupi as Mélik
- Anthony Gildès as Le facteur
- Louis Salou as François

== Bibliography ==
- Oscherwitz, Dayna & Higgins, MaryEllen. The A to Z of French Cinema. Scarecrow Press, 2009.
