= Ruy Blas (film) =

1948 film

- Directed by: Pierre Billon
- Screenplay by: Jean Cocteau
- Based on: Ruy Blas by Victor Hugo
- Produced by: Georges Legrand; Nino Martegani; André Paulvé
- Starring: Danielle Darrieux; Jean Marais; Marcel Herrand
- Cinematography: Michel Kelber
- Edited by: Maurice Serein
- Music by: Georges Auric
- Production companies: Films André Paulvé; Productions Georges Legrand; Martegani Produzione
- Distributed by: DisCina; Atlantis Film
- Release date: 15 February 1948
- Running time: 93 minutes
- Countries: France; Italy
- Language: French
- Box office: 2,453,187 admissions (France)

Ruy Blas is a 1948 French-Italian historical drama film directed by Pierre Billon and starring Danielle Darrieux, Jean Marais and Marcel Herrand. The screenplay was written by Jean Cocteau based on the 1838 play of the same title by Victor Hugo. It was shot at the Icet Studios in Milan and on location at Cassis in Southern France. The film's sets were designed by the art director Georges Wakhévitch.

== Cast ==
- Danielle Darrieux as La reine d'Espagne Marie de Neubourg
- Jean Marais as Ruy Blas / Don César de Bazan
- Marcel Herrand as Le marquis Don Salluste de Bazan
- Gabrielle Dorziat as La duchesse d'Albuquerque
- Alexandre Rignault as Goulatromba
- Giovanni Grasso as Don Gaspar Guritan
- Paul Amiot as Le marquis de Santa Cruz
- Jone Salinas as Casilda, la servante
- Gilles Quéant as Le duc d'Albe
- Jacques Berlioz as Un ministre
- Charles Lemontier as Le comte de Camporeal
- Pierre Magnier as Le marquis de Priego
- Armand Lurville as L'archevêque

== Reception ==
Bosley Crowther, The New York Times critic, wrote:

... it is plainly, [sic] apparent that the famous "bad boy" of French films [Cocteau] has paid more attention to the appearance than to the dramatic vitality of his job. ... the story here played of a young student, who, because of his resemblance to an errant grandee, is introduced into the Spanish court as a pawn in an intrigue against the queen is so stiff and vague in its development that it lacks emotional force. And it is performed with such decadence of gesture that it is just a bit absurd. Jean Marais, who plays the student Ruy Blas and also the naughty grandee, is a very handsome young fellow, but he is decidedly prissy in this film. And his wild and grinning expressions in those scenes wherein he's called upon to play with a great Douglas Fairbanks abandon are almost ludicrous.

== See also ==
- Delusions of Grandeur (1971)

== Bibliography ==
- Chiti, Roberto & Poppi, Roberto. I film: Tutti i film italiani dal 1930 al 1944. Gremese Editore, 2005.
- Tolton, C.D.E. The Cinema of Jean Cocteau: Essays on His Films and Their Coctelian Sources. Legas, 1998.
