= Du Guesclin (film) =

1949 film

- Directed by: Bernard de Latour
- Written by: Bernard de Latour
- Based on: Du Guesclin by Roger Vercel
- Produced by: André Paulvé; Edouard Lepage
- Starring: Fernand Gravey; Junie Astor; Ketti Gallian
- Cinematography: Nicolas Toporkoff
- Edited by: Maurice Serein
- Music by: Maurice Thiriet
- Production company: Les Films du Verseau
- Distributed by: DisCina
- Release date: 3 June 1949
- Running time: 87 minutes
- Country: France
- Language: French

Du Guesclin is a 1949 French historical adventure film directed by Bernard de Latour and starring Fernand Gravey, Junie Astor and Ketti Gallian. The film is a biopic about Bertrand du Guesclin, a baron, Constable of France, and high-ranked officer in the French Army of the 14th Century, who fights in the Hundred Years' War. It is based on the novel Du Guesclin by Roger Vercel. It was filmed at Marseille Studios and on location at the Château de Dinan in Brittany. The film's sets were designed by the art director Jacques Krauss.

== Cast ==
- Fernand Gravey as Bertrand du Guesclin
- Junie Astor as Tiphaine Raguenel
- Ketti Gallian as Jeanne de Mallemains
- Noël Roquevert as Jagu, Bertrand's friend
- Howard Vernon as Lancaster
- Gérard Oury as Charles V of France
- Gisèle Casadesus as Jeanne, the Countess of Penthièvre
- Louis de Funès as Astrologer
- Marcel Delaître as Chandos
- Léon Bary as Léon Barry
- Michel Salina as Canterbury
- Paul Amiot as Le duc d'Anjou
- Suzanne Nivette as Soeur Anne-Marie

== Bibliography ==
- Vincendeau, Ginette . Stars and Stardom in French Cinema. Bloomsbury Publishing, 2000.
