= Marcel Maupi =

French actor (1881–1949)

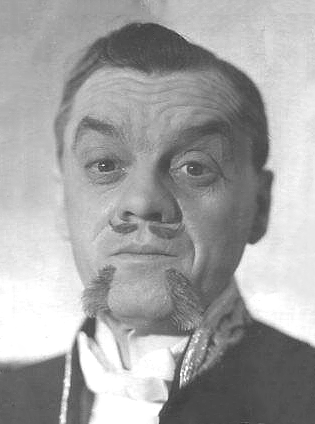
Image of Maupi

Marcel Maupi, stage name of Marcel Louis Alexandre Barberin or Maupi, (6 November 1881, Marseille – 4 January 1949, Antibes) was a French actor.

== Selected filmography ==
- Dance Hall (1931)
- Marius (1931)
- Fanny (1932)
- The Ironmaster (1933)
- The Weaker Sex (1933)
- Roger la Honte (1933)
- La dame de chez Maxim's (1933)
- The Typist Gets Married (1934)
- The Darling of His Concierge (1934)
- Tartarin of Tarascon (1934)
- One Night's Secret (1934)
- Toboggan (1934)
- Gaspard de Besse (1935)
- Ferdinand the Roisterer (1935)
- César (1936)
- Forty Little Mothers (1936)
- The Brighton Twins (1936)
- Blanchette (1937)
- The Kings of Sport (1937)
- In Venice, One Night (1937)
- Balthazar (1937)
- The Baker's Wife (1938)
- Rail Pirates (1938)
- The New Rich (1938)
- The Strange Monsieur Victor (1938)
- Berlingot and Company (1939)
- Angelica (1939)
- Camp Thirteen (1940)
- President Haudecoeur (1940)
- First Ball (1941)
- Sins of Youth (1941)
- The Last of the Six (1941)
- The Benefactor (1942)
- Twisted Mistress (1942)
- Sideral Cruises (1942)
- Malaria (1943)
- Voyage Without Hope (1943)
- Happy Go Luck (1946)
- The Adventure of Cabassou (1946)
- The Marriage of Ramuntcho (1947)
- False Identity (1947)
- One Night at the Tabarin (1947)
- Colomba (1948)
- Two Loves (1949)
- The Red Signal (1949)
- Passion for Life (1949)
