= The King (1949 film) =

1949 film

- Directed by: Marc-Gilbert Sauvajon
- Written by: Marc-Gilbert Sauvajon
- Based on: The King by Emmanuel Arène; Gaston Arman de Caillavet; Robert de Flers
- Produced by: André Paulvé; Michel Safra
- Starring: Maurice Chevalier; Annie Ducaux; Sophie Desmarets
- Cinematography: Robert Lefebvre
- Edited by: Roger Dwyre
- Music by: Jean Marion
- Production company: Spéva Films
- Distributed by: DisCina
- Release date: 14 December 1949
- Running time: 100 minutes
- Country: France
- Language: French

The King (French: Le roi) is a 1949 French comedy film directed by Marc-Gilbert Sauvajon and starring Maurice Chevalier, Annie Ducaux and Sophie Desmarets. It is a remake of the 1936 film The King. It was shot at the Victorine Studios in Nice. The film's sets were designed by the art directors Guy de Gastyne and Paul-Louis Boutié.

== Synopsis ==
It follows the adventures of King Jean IV of Cerdagne when he visits Paris to sign an important treaty.

== Cast ==
- Maurice Chevalier as The King Jean IV de Cerdagne
- Annie Ducaux as Therese Marnix
- Sophie Desmarets as Mme Youyou Bourdier
- Alfred Adam as Bourdier
- Jean Wall as Le Lorrain
- Robert Murzeau as Blond
- Henri Charrett as Cormeau, Minister of Commerce
- Marcel Delaître as Count Martin de Mortier
- Félix Paquet as Gabrier, Postmaster General
- François Joux as Marcel Rivelot
- Lucien Callamand as Dominique
- Roger Monteaux as Aubergiste
- Albert Michel as Un inspecteur
- Jacqueline Noëlle as Jeune veuve
- Robert Vattier as Marquis de Chamarande

== Bibliography ==
- Goble, Alan. The Complete Index to Literary Sources in Film. Walter de Gruyter, 1999.
