= Lucrezia Borgia (1935 film) =

1935 film

- Directed by: Abel Gance
- Written by: Léopold Marchand; Henri Vendresse
- Based on: Lukrezia Borgia by Alfred Schirokauer
- Produced by: Robert Bossis; Bob Faure; Paul Madeux; Henri Ullmann
- Starring: Edwige Feuillère; Gabriel Gabrio; Maurice Escande; Roger Karl
- Cinematography: Roger Hubert
- Edited by: Roger Mercanton
- Music by: Marcel Lattès
- Production companies: Compagnie du Cinema; La Magie du Cinéma
- Distributed by: Héraut Film
- Release date: 20 December 1935
- Running time: 93 minutes
- Country: France
- Language: French

Lucrezia Borgia (French: Lucrèce Borgia) is a 1935 French historical film directed by Abel Gance and starring Edwige Feuillère, Gabriel Gabrio and Maurice Escande. It was shot at the Saint-Maurice Studios in Paris. The film's sets were designed by the art directors Henri Ménessier and René Renoux. Feuillère's performance was widely acclaimed by critics, and significantly boosted her career.

== Synopsis ==
The scheming Cesar Borgia, son of Pope Alexander, plans to marry his sister Lucrezia off to boost his own power in Italy. However, she has her own ideas.

== Cast ==
- Edwige Feuillère as Lucrezia Borgia
- Gabriel Gabrio as Cesar Borgia
- Maurice Escande as Jean Borgia, Duke of Gandie
- Roger Karl as Rodrigo Borgia, Pope Alexander VI
- Aimé Clariond as Niccolò Machiavelli
- Philippe Hériat as Filippo, sculptor-lover
- Jacques Dumesnil as Giannino Sforza, Duke of Milano
- Max Michel as Alfonse de Aragon
- Louis Eymond as Capt. Mario, officer-lover
- Jean Fay as Tybald
- René Bergeron as Pietro
- Gaston Modot as Fracassa
- Antonin Artaud as Girolamo Savonarola
- Marcel Chabrier as Un moine - l'envoyé de Savonarole
- Georges Prieur as Baron de Villeneuve
- Louis Perdoux as Carlo
- Yvonne Drines as Flamette
- Mona Dol as La Vespa
- Jeannine Fromentin as La Malatesta
- Josette Day as Sancia, Lucrezia's companion
- Daniel Mendaille as Micheletto, chief henchman

== Bibliography ==
- Kennedy-Karpat, Colleen. Rogues, Romance, and Exoticism in French Cinema of the 1930s. Fairleigh Dickinson, 2013.
- Oscherwitz, Dayna Higgins, Maryellen. The A to Z of French Cinema. Scarecrow Press, 2009.
