= Sophie Desmarets =

French actress (1922–2012)

- Born: 7 April 1922; Paris, Ile-de-France, France
- Died: 13 February 2012 (aged 89); Paris, Ile-de-France, France
- Other name: Jacqueline Yvonne Eva Desmarets
- Occupation: Actress
- Years active: 1940–1996 (film)

Sophie Desmarets (French pronunciation: [sɔfi demaʁɛ]; 1922–2012) was a French film actress.

== Selected filmography ==
- Battement de coeur (1940) - (uncredited)
- Premier rendez-vous (1941) - Henriette Lefranc
- The Man Who Played with Fire (1942) - Gabrielle
- Des jeunes filles dans la nuit (1943) - Louise
- Alone in the Night (1945) - Thérèse
- 120, Gare Street (1946) - Hélène Chatelain
- The Captain (1946) - Marion Delorme
- Third at Heart (1947) - Gaby
- The Revenge of Baccarat (1947) - La comtesse Artoff dite 'Baccarat'
- Woman Without a Past (1948) - Caroline
- Cruise for the Unknown One (1948) - Marianne Fabre
- Memories Are Not for Sale (1948) - Brigitte
- Night Express (1948) - Simone
- A Change in the Wind (1949) - Claire Donadieu
- The Widow and the Innocent (1949) - Nicole - l'avocate
- The King (1949) - Mme Youyou Bourdier
- My Friend Sainfoin (1950) - Eugénie
- Just Me (1950) - Caroline Peuchat
- Le Sabre de mon père - (1951) - Françoise Dujardin
- Tomorrow We Get Divorced (1951) - Colette Blanchet
- Rome-Paris-Rome (1951) - Ginette
- My Wife Is Formidable (1951) - Sylvia Corbier
- My Husband Is Marvelous (1952) - Sylvia Corbier
- Women of Paris (1953) - Elle-même (uncredited)
- Service Entrance (1954) - Madame Dumény
- Scènes de ménage (1954) - Aglaë
- Caroline and the Rebels (1955) - Duchesse Laure d'Albuquerque
- The Last Five Minutes (1955) - La duchessa Isabella Camporese
- Une fille épatante (1955) - Dominique Laugier
- If Paris Were Told to Us (1956) - Rose Bertin
- Le secret de soeur Angèle (1956) - Soeur Angèle
- Ces sacrées vacances (1956) - Claudette Pinson
- Ce soir les jupons volent (1956) - Marlène
- Miss Catastrophe (1956) - Elvire Mercier
- Three Make a Pair (1957) - Titine
- Fumée blonde (1957) - Sophie Mallet
- Filous et compagnie (1957) - Marianne
- Life Together (1958) - Marguerite Caboufigue
- Madame et son auto (1958) - Sophie Dirondel
- Nina (1959) - Nina Tessier
- Drôles de phénomènes (1959) - Aline Chantour
- Love and the Frenchwoman (1960) - Lucienne, Bichette's mother (segment "Adolescence, L'")
- Anonima cocottes (1960)
- The Fenouillard Family (1960) - Léocadie Fanouillard
- La ragazza di mille mesi (1961) - Armanzia
- Le motorizzate (1963) - The Lady Driver (segment "La Signora Ci Marcia")
- Sweet and Sour (1963) - Lulu la pianiste
- La foire aux cancres (Chronique d'une année scolaire) (1963) - Mme Sigoules
- La chance et l'amour (1964) - Léa Anders (segment "Lucky la chance")
- Cent briques et des tuiles (1965)
- La tête du client (1965) - Françoise Berrien
- All Mad About Him (1967) - Hélène Maccard
- Atlantic Wall (1970) - Maria Duchemin
- La raison du plus fou (1973) - La préripatéticienne
- Le maestro (1977) - Germaine Bourgeon
- Un second souffle (1978) - Louise Davis
- Les mamies (1992) - Simone
- Pourquoi maman est dans mon lit? (1994) - Mamie Jeanne
- Fantôme avec chauffeur (1996) - Delphine, la parente kleptomane
- Fallait pas!... (1996) - Constance's Mother (final film role)

== Bibliography ==
- Davis, Ronald L. Hollywood Beauty: Linda Darnell and the American Dream. University of Oklahoma Press, 2014.
