= The Heart Disposes =

1936 film

- Directed by: Georges Lacombe
- Written by: Michel Arnaud; René Pujol
- Based on: The Heart Disposes by Francis de Croisset
- Produced by: Pierre Brauer; Raoul Ploquin
- Starring: Renée Saint-Cyr; Raymond Rouleau; Marguerite Templey
- Cinematography: Willy Winterstein
- Music by: Werner Bochmann
- Production company: L'Alliance Cinématographique Européenne
- Distributed by: L'Alliance Cinématographique Européenne
- Release date: 15 May 1936
- Running time: 70 minutes
- Country: France
- Language: French

The Heart Disposes (French: Le coeur dispose) is a 1936 French comedy film directed by Georges Lacombe and starring Renée Saint-Cyr, Raymond Rouleau and Marguerite Templey. It was based on a play by Francis de Croisset. The film's sets were designed by the art director Carl Ludwig Kirmse.

== Synopsis ==
Robert, the secretary to a Chatelaine, is roped in to help her marry off her only unmarried daughter Hélène. Robert and Hélène don't hit it off but when she shows attention to a widowed and cynical baron he eventually comes to her rescue.

== Cast ==
- Renée Saint-Cyr as Hélène
- Raymond Rouleau as Robert Levaltier
- Marguerite Templey as Mme Miran-Charville
- Nicole Vattier as Lady Hamilton
- Christian Gérard as Le prétendant
- Jacques Dumesnil as Le baron Houzier
- Pierre Palau as Parainneaux
- Félix Oudart as M. Miran-Charvile

== Bibliography ==
- Bessy, Maurice & Chirat, Raymond. Histoire du cinéma français: 1935–1939. Pygmalion, 1986.
- Crisp, Colin. Genre, Myth and Convention in the French Cinema, 1929–1939. Indiana University Press, 2002.
- Rège, Philippe. Encyclopedia of French Film Directors, Volume 1. Scarecrow Press, 2009.
