= Jean d'Yd =

French actor (1880–1964)

- Born: Jean Paul Félix Didier Perret; 17 May 1880; Paris, France
- Died: 14 May 1964 (aged 83); Vernon, Eure, France

Jean Paul Félix Didier Perret, who used the stage name Jean d'Yd, was a French actor and comedian who was born in Paris on 17 May 1880. He died in Vernon, Eure, France on 14 May 1964.

== Selected filmography ==
- 1923: La Dame de Monsoreau (directed by René Le Somptier) – Chicot
- 1923: Le chant de l'amour triomphant (directed by Victor Tourjansky) – Le serviteur hindou
- 1923: La souriante Madame Beudet (directed by Germaine Dulac) – Monsieur Labas
- 1923: Gossette (directed by Germaine Dulac) – Maître Varadès
- 1924: The Thruster (directed by André Hugon) – L'avocat général
- 1924: La main qui a tué (directed by Maurice de Marsan and Maurice Gleize) – Inspecteur Bréchet
- 1926: Nitchevo (directed by Jacques de Baroncelli) – Commandant Le Gossec
- 1927: Napoléon (directed by Abel Gance) – La Bussière
- 1928: La Passion de Jeanne d'Arc (directed by Carl Dreyer) – Guillaume Evrard
- 1931: La fin du monde (directed by Abel Gance) – M. de Murcie
- 1931: Fra Diavolo (directed by Mario Bonnard)
- 1931: Tu m'oublieras (directed by Henri Diamant-Berger) – Adolphe Dautrive
- 1932: Monsieur de Pourceaugnac (directed by Gaston Ravel et Tony Lekain) – Le médecin
- 1932: Une heure (Short, directed by Léo Mittler) – Le père de Jacques
- 1932: La vitrine (Short, directed by Léo Mittler)
- 1933: Direct au coeur (directed by Roger Lion) – Journalist #2
- 1933: Rothchild (directed by Marco de Gastyne) – Le professeur
- 1934: Les Misérables (directed by Raymond Bernard) – Le directeur de l'école (uncredited)
- 1934: Tartarin of Tarascon (directed by Raymond Bernard) – Ladevèze
- 1934: L'article 330 (Short, directed by Marcel Pagnol)
- 1935: Amour et publicité (Short, directed by Léo Mittler)
- 1938: La Rue sans joie (directed by André Hugon) – L'avocat général
- 1938: Alerte en Méditerranée (directed by Léo Joannon) – Le père Blanc
- 1939: Entente cordiale (directed by Marcel L'Herbier) – Joë Chamberlain
- 1940: The Emigrant (directed by Léo Joannon) – L'ingénieur-chef
- 1942: Les hommes sans peur (directed by Yvan Noé) – Un médecin
- 1942: Les Visiteurs du soir (directed by Marcel Carné) – Le baladin
- 1942: Les petits riens (directed by Raymond Bernard)
- 1943: L'Éternel retour (directed by Jean Delannoy) – Amédée Frossin
- 1944: Félicie Nanteuil (directed by Marc Allégret) – Le docteur Socrate
- 1945: La Vie de bohème (directed by Marcel L'Herbier) – (uncredited)
- 1946: Raboliot (directed by Jacques Daroy) – Touraille
- 1946: Jericho (directed by Henri Calef) – Un conseiller
- 1946: Martin Roumagnac (directed by Georges Lacombe) – L'oncle de Blanche
- 1946: Impasse (directed by Pierre Dard) – Le professeur Sartory
- 1947: Dreams of Love (directed by Christian Stengel) – Cadolle
- 1947: Capitaine Blomet (directed by Andrée Feix) – (uncredited)
- 1948: The Private Life of an Actor (directed by Sacha Guitry) – Lucien Guitry enfant
- 1948: The Last Vacation (directed by Roger Leenhardt) – Walter Lherminier
- 1948: The Cavalier of Croix-Mort (directed by Lucien Gasnier-Raymond) – Louis-Antoine
- 1948: Le colonel Durand (directed by René Chanas)
- 1949: Fantomas Against Fantomas (directed by Robert Vernay) – Le neurologue
- 1950: La Belle que voilà (directed by Jean-Paul Le Chanois) – Ceccati
- 1950: Justice est faite (directed by André Cayatte) – Le supérieur de l'école religieuse
- 1950: God Needs Men (directed by Jean Delannoy) – Corentin Gourvennec
- 1952: Agence matrimoniale (directed by Jean-Paul Le Chanois) – Le père de la jeune fille jourde
- 1953: Lucrèce Borgia (directed by Christian-Jaque) – Le médecin
- 1954: On Trial (directed by Julien Duvivier) – Le président
- 1955: The Little Rebels (directed by Jean Delannoy) – Le grand-père de Francis
- 1956: L'Homme et l'Enfant (directed by Raoul André) – Félix Mercier
- 1956: Les Truands (directed by Carlo Rim) – Le grand-père
- 1958: Les Misérables (directed by Jean-Paul Le Chanois) – Le père Mabeuf
- 1958: Les naufrageurs (directed by Charles Brabant) – Le curé (final film role)

== Theatre ==
- 1958 Monsieur de France by Jacques François, directed by Christian-Gérard Théâtre des Bouffes-Parisiens
