= Roger Dwyre =

French film editor (1913–2005)

- Born: December 31, 1913; Paris, France
- Died: May 24, 2005 (aged 91); Tourrettes-sur-Loup, Alpes-Maritimes, France
- Occupation: Film Editor
- Years active: 1946–1975

Roger Dwyre (December 31, 1913 — May 24, 2005) was a French film editor. He was active in the French film industry for several decades, as well as working on American-financed productions shot in Europe such as The Madwoman of Chaillot. He collaborated with director Jules Dassin a number of times, including the 1955 crime film Rififi.

== Selected filmography ==
- The Damned (1947)
- The King (1949)
- Lady Paname (1950)
- Just Me (1950)
- The Glass Castle (1950)
- Paris Vice Squad (1951)
- Les nuits de Paris (1951)
- Great Man (1951)
- The Happiest of Men (1952)
- Forbidden Games (1952)
- The Slave (1953)
- Open Letter (1953)
- Le guérisseur (1953)
- Quay of Blondes (1954)
- Rififi (1955)
- The Heroes Are Tired (1955)
- Nagana (1955)
- The Ambassador's Daughter (1956)
- He Who Must Die (1957)
- Typhoon Over Nagasaki (1957)
- Tamango (1958)
- The Law (1959)
- Never on Sunday (1960)
- The Big Gamble (1961)
- Paris Blues (1961)
- Phaedra (1962)
- Le Crime ne paie pas (1962)
- Gigot (1962)
- Topkapi (1964)
- Lady L (1965)
- The Defector (1966)
- Triple Cross (1966)
- 10:30 P.M. Summer (1966)
- The Madwoman of Chaillot (1969)
- And Hope to Die (1972)
- War Goddess (1973)
- The Day That Shook the World (1975)

== Bibliography ==
- Edwards, Anne. Katharine Hepburn: A Remarkable Woman. Rowman & Littlefield, 2019.
- Powrie, Phil. The Cinema of France. Wallflower Press, 2006.
