= Maurice Serein =

French film editor

- Born: 13 October 1905; Paris, France
- Died: 19 September 1974 (aged 68); Courbevoie, France
- Occupation: Editor
- Years active: 1932-1962 (film)

Maurice Serein (1905-1974) was a French film editor. He was active in the French film industry from 1934 to 1962.

== Selected filmography ==
- Love and Luck (1932)
- Sidonie Panache (1934)
- Chourinette (1934)
- Little One (1935)
- His Excellency Antonin (1935)
- The Bureaucrats (1936)
- You Are Me (1936)
- Ménilmontant (1936)
- Claudine at School (1937)
- The Messenger (1937)
- The Tamer (1938)
- Extenuating Circumstances (1939)
- Latin Quarter (1939)
- Nine Bachelors (1939)
- Case of Conscience (1939)
- The Man Who Seeks the Truth (1940)
- The Beautiful Trip (1947)
- The Woman in Red (1947)
- Ruy Blas (1948)
- Du Guesclin (1949)
- Manèges (1950)
- Farewell Mister Grock (1950)
- Miracles Only Happen Once (1951)
- Women Are Angels (1952)
- Zoé (1954)
- At the Order of the Czar (1954)
- Les mauvaises rencontres (1955)
- The Price of Love (1955)
- The Singer from Mexico (1957)
- Tabarin (1958)
- Serenade of Texas (1958)
- Thunder in the Blood (1960)
- Konga Yo (1962)

== Bibliography ==
- Hayward, Susan. Simone Signoret: The Star as Cultural Sign. Continuum, 2004.
- Mitchell, Charles P. The Great Composers Portrayed on Film, 1913 through 2002. McFarland, 2004.
