= Paul Amiot =

French actor (1886–1979)

- Born: 29 March 1886; Paris, France
- Died: 26 January 1979 (aged 92); Paris, France
- Occupation: actor
- Years active: 1910–1973

Paul Amiot (French: [pɔl amjo]; 29 March 1886 – 26 January 1979) was a French film actor. His career spanned some 63 years and he appeared in nearly 100 films between 1910 and 1973.

In 1920 he appeared in Robert Péguy's Être aimé pour soi-même. He was noted for his consistent roles as a figures of authority. He regularly played police inspectors or detectives, lawyers and physicians. He starred in some 100 films between 1908 and 1930. On his death in 1979 he donated his body to scientific research.

== Selected filmography ==
- Volonté (1917) - Thauziat
- Travail (1920) - Feuillat
- Être aimé pour soi-même (1920) - Le duc de Castry - un noble milliardaire
- Le secret de Rosette Lambert (1920) - Lambert
- Une fleur dans les ronces (1921) - Le secrétaire
- Les parias de l'amour (1921) - Petit-Costaud
- La résurrection du Bouif (1922) - Le comte de Saint Gaudens
- Rapax (1922) - Georges Castillon
- L'île sans nom (1922) - Le commandant Edouard de Herche
- La bête traquée (1923) - Aubertel
- L'espionne (1923) - Tekli
- Jean Chouan (1926) - Le marquis de Thorigné
- Napoleon (1927) - Antoine Quentin Fouquier de Tinville dit Fouquier-Tinville (uncredited)
- Fleur d'amour (1927) - L'officier
- Verdun: Visions of History (1928)
- The Best Mistress (1929) - Un employé
- The Dream (1931) - Hubert
- Verdun, souvenirs d'histoire (1931) - Le soldat français
- Lilac (1932) - Merlu
- Un homme sans nom (1932) - Le docteur Alfred Sander
- Coeurs joyeux (1932)
- The Star of Valencia (1933) - Le capitaine Rustan
- Mannequins (1933) - L'inspecteur
- Le voleur (1933) - Mr. Zambault
- Fedora (1934) - Gretch
- Ces messieurs de la Santé (1934) - Le commissaire
- Toboggan (1934) - Anderson
- La cinquième empreinte (1934) - L'inspecteur Robert
- Three Sailors (1934)
- L'école des contribuables (1934) - Le ministre des finances
- Moscow Nights (1934) - Le président de la cour martiale
- Justin de Marseille (1935) - Le sous-directeur de la Sûreté
- Gangster malgré lui (1935)
- The Crew (1935)
- Napoléon Bonaparte (1935) - Antoine Quentin Fouqier de Tinville dit Fouquier-Tinville (uncredited)
- Stradivarius (1935)
- Flight Into Darkness (1935) - Le soldat du 54e (uncredited)
- Moses and Solomon, Perfumers (1935) - Supervielle
- Gaspard de Besse (1935) - Le juge Cocarel
- Taras Bulba (1936) - Prince Zamnitzky
- Sous la terreur (1936) - Yel
- A Legionnaire (1936) - Le colonel
- The King (1936) - Lelorrain
- Monsieur Personne (1936) - Le commissaire
- The New Men (1936) - D'Amade
- À nous deux, madame la vie (1937) - Gaston
- The Red Dancer (1937) - Le commissaire
- The Citadel of Silence (1937) - Vladorowsky
- J'accuse! (1938) - Le capitaine
- The Innocent (1938) - Delmas - un policier
- The Postmaster's Daughter (1938) - Le commissaire
- The Lafarge Case (1938) - Le procureur
- Crossroads (1938) - Le président
- Women's Prison (1938) - Le procureur
- Three from St Cyr (1939) - Le général
- Angelica (1939) - Iramundi
- Entente cordiale (1939) - Le prince de Bulow
- Savage Brigade (1939)
- Madame Sans-Gêne (1941) - Maximilen de Robespierre
- Monsieur La Souris (1942) - Le commissaire Lucas
- L'aventure est au coin de la rue (1944) - L'inspecteur Pillot
- Manon, a 326 (1945)
- Peloton d'exécution (1945)
- The Angel They Gave Me (1946)
- The Queen's Necklace (1946) - Maître Doillot, l'avocat de Jeanne
- Martin Roumagnac (1946) - Le président du tribunal
- The Royalists (1947) - Le comte de Beauvent
- The Mysterious Monsieur Sylvain (1947) - Le colonel
- Miroir (1947) - (uncredited)
- Fantômas (1947) - Le directeur de la Sûreté
- The Great Maguet (1947) - Le professeur
- Third at Heart (1947) - Le président du tribunal
- Secret Cargo (1947) - Le gouverneur
- Ruy Blas (1948) - Le marquis de Santa Cruz
- Dilemma of Two Angels (1948) - Le chef
- Du Guesclin (1949) - Le duc d'Anjou
- Orpheus (1950) - Judge (uncredited)
- La peau d'un homme (1951) - Lejeune
- Dakota 308 (1951) - L'inspecteur Joly
- La Fugue de Monsieur Perle (1952) - Le commissaire
- Flesh and the Woman (1954) - Le capitaine
- Interdit de séjour (1955) - (uncredited)
- Nana (1955) - Le commisaire (uncredited)
- Alerte au deuxième bureau (1956) - Morel
- Famous Love Affairs (1961) - L'autre chevalier du Gurthenberg (segment "Agnès Bernauer") (uncredited)
- The Count of Monte Cristo (1961) - Le président de la Chambre des pairs
- Two Are Guilty (1963) - Un homme
- Germinal (1963) - Un officiel (uncredited)
- Graduation Year (1964) - Le général
- Le Cercle rouge (1970) - L'inspecteur général de la police
- There's No Smoke Without Fire (1973) - Le docteur
- The Inheritor (1973) - Hugo Cordell
- There's No Smoke Without Fire (1973) - Georges Arnaud
- The Train (1973) - François dit Verdun - un ancien combattant (final film role)

== Honors and awards ==
Officer of the Order of Legion of Honour
