= Gibraltar (1964 film) =

1964 film

- Directed by: Pierre Gaspard-Huit
- Written by: Jacques Companéez; Pierre Gaspard-Huit; Jean Stelli; Robert Thomas
- Produced by: José Gutiérrez Maesso; Michel Safra; Serge Silberman; Georges Lourau
- Starring: Hildegard Knef; Gérard Barray; Geneviève Grad
- Cinematography: Charly Niessen; Cecilio Paniagua
- Edited by: Louisette Hautecoeur
- Music by: André Hossein
- Production companies: Ciné-Alliance; Filmsonor; Spéva Films; Federiz; Tecisa
- Distributed by: Cocinor; Constantin Film; Mercurio Films
- Release date: 29 January 1964
- Running time: 100 minutes
- Countries: France; Italy; Spain
- Language: French

Gibraltar is a 1964 thriller film directed by Pierre Gaspard-Huit and starring Hildegard Knef, Gérard Barray, Geneviève Grad and Elisa Montés. It was made as a co-production between France, Italy and Spain. The film was designed by the art director Francisco Canet.

== Synopsis ==
A secret agent goes undercover to infiltrate smugglers between Tangiers and Gibraltar.

== Cast ==
- Hildegard Knef as Elinor van Berg
- Gérard Barray as Frank Jackson
- Geneviève Grad as Cathy Maxwell
- Elisa Montés as Lola
- Claudio Gora as General Maxwell
- Fausto Tozzi as Paoli
- Bernard Dhéran as Harry Williams
- Jacques Seiler as Kovacks
- José Marco Davó as Prestamista
- Silvia Solar as Miriam
- Luis Induni as Admiral
- Jean Ozenne as Thomas Barnett
- Antonio Molino Rojo as Thug
- Frank Braña as Thug

== See also ==
- Gibraltar (1938)
- The Sharks of Gibraltar (1947)
