= Just Me (film) =

1950 film

- Directed by: Marc-Gilbert Sauvajon
- Written by: Marc-Gilbert Sauvajon
- Produced by: André Paulvé; Michel Safra
- Starring: Maurice Chevalier; Sophie Desmarets; Jean Wall
- Cinematography: Henri Alekan
- Edited by: Roger Dwyre
- Music by: Jean Marion
- Production companies: DisCina; Spéva Films
- Distributed by: DisCina
- Release date: 15 November 1950
- Running time: 102 minutes
- Country: France
- Language: French

Just Me (French: Ma pomme) is a 1950 French musical comedy film directed by Marc-Gilbert Sauvajon and starring Maurice Chevalier, Sophie Desmarets and Jean Wall. It was shot at the Boulogne Studios in Paris and on location at the city's Orly Airport. The film's sets were designed by the art director Jean d'Eaubonne.

== Cast ==
- Maurice Chevalier as Maurice Vallier dit 'Ma Pomme'
- Sophie Desmarets as Caroline Peuchat
- Jean Wall as Peuchat
- Jane Marken as Mme Deply
- Raymond Bussières as Fricotard
- Véra Norman as Claire Andrieux
- Jacques Baumer as Me Dubuisson
- Jacques Dynam as Jacques Turpin
- Suzanne Grey as La patronne
- Odette Barencey as La concierge
- Jean Hébey as Le patron du restaurant
- François Joux as Le mari inquiet
- Pierre Juvenet as Le président
- Mag-Avril as La dame au faux billet de mille
- Alexandre Mihalesco as Le concierge
- Félix Paquet as Valentin
- Fernand Rauzéna as Le maestro
- Barbara Shaw as Coppélia
- Germaine Stainval as La présidente
- Roger Vincent as Le médecin
- André Wasley as L'agent
- Marcel Charvey as Le journaliste
- Guy Henry as Un invité chez les Peuchat
- Ann Rachlin as Swimmer

== Bibliography ==
- Bessy, Maurice & Chirat, Raymond. Histoire du cinéma français: encyclopédie des films, 1940–1950. Pygmalion, 1986
- Rège, Philippe. Encyclopedia of French Film Directors, Volume 1. Scarecrow Press, 2009.
