= Gibraltar (1938 film) =

1938 film

- Directed by: Fyodor Otsep
- Written by: Ernst Neubach; Simon Gantillon; Jean Stelli; Erich von Stroheim; Jacques Companéez; Hans Jacoby
- Produced by: Gregor Rabinovitch; André Paulvé
- Starring: Roger Duchesne; Viviane Romance; Erich von Stroheim
- Cinematography: Jacques Mercanton; Theodore J. Pahle
- Edited by: Georges Friedland
- Music by: Paul Dessau
- Production companies: Ciné-Alliance; DisCina; Gloria Film; La Magie du Cinéma
- Distributed by: DisCina
- Release date: 30 November 1938
- Running time: 105 minutes
- Country: France
- Language: French

Gibraltar is a 1938 French spy film directed by Fedor Ozep and starring Viviane Romance, Roger Duchesne, Abel Jacquin and Erich von Stroheim. It was shot at the Joinville Studios in Paris, with location shooting taking place in Gibraltar itself despite the Spanish Civil War being fought across the border. The film's sets were designed by the art director Georges Wakhévitch. It was later remade in 1964 under the same title.

== Synopsis ==
The plot concerns a British officer stationed in Gibraltar who goes undercover to infiltrate a gang of hostile agents.

== Main cast ==
- Viviane Romance as Mercedes
- Roger Duchesne as Robert Jackson
- Abel Jacquin as Frank Lloyd
- Erich von Stroheim as Marson
- Jean Périer as Col. Wilcox
- Yvette Lebon as Maud Wilcox
- Paulette Pax as Mme. Nichols
- André Roanne as Le Lt. Français
- Georges Flamant as Maori
- Odette Talazac as Angelina, Dresser
- Madeleine Suffel as Nelly, Manicurist

== See also ==
- The Sharks of Gibraltar (1947)
- Gibraltar (1964)

== Bibliography ==
- Julio Ponce Alberca Gibraltar and the Spanish Civil War, 1936-39: Local, National and International Perspectives. Bloomsbury Publishing, 2015.
