= DisCina =

French film company

DisCina was a French film production and distribution company established in 1938 by Michel Safra and André Paulvé. It reached its peak during the 1940s and early 1950s, remaining active during the Occupation of France.

It also operated a distribution company in the United States to release its French films on the American art house market.

== Selected filmography ==
- Alexis, Gentleman Chauffeur (1938)
- Conflict (1938)
- Gibraltar (1938)
- Monsieur Coccinelle (1938)
- Angelica (1939)
- La Loi du Nord (1939)
- Serge Panine (1939)
- The Fatted Calf (1939)
- Personal Column (1939)
- Beating Heart (1940)
- Thunder Over Paris (1940)
- First Ball (1941)
- Foolish Husbands (1941)
- Carmen (1942)
- Macao (1942)
- The Murderer is Afraid at Night (1942)
- Summer Light (1943)
- The Eternal Return (1943)
- The Mysteries of Paris (1943)
- The Bellman (1945)
- Box of Dreams (1945)
- Mademoiselle X (1945)
- Father Goriot (1945)
- Beauty and the Beast (1946)
- Sylvie and the Ghost (1946)
- Rendezvous in Paris (1947)
- The Sharks of Gibraltar (1947)
- Something to Sing About (1947)
- The Great Dawn (1947)
- Monsieur Wens Holds the Trump Cards (1947)
- Ruy Blas (1948)
- Rocambole (1948)
- The Revenge of Baccarat (1948)
- The Tragic Dolmen (1948)
- The Charterhouse of Parma (1948)
- Du Guesclin (1949)
- Jour de fête (1949)
- White Paws (1949)
- All Roads Lead to Rome (1949)
- The Dancer of Marrakesh (1949)
- The King (1949)
- The Hunted (1950)
- Just Me (1950)
- Manèges (1950)
- Lady Paname (1950)
- Farewell Mister Grock (1950)
- Orpheus (1950)
- The Red Needle (1951)
- Tomorrow We Get Divorced (1951)
- My Seal and Them (1951)
- The Night Is My Kingdom (1951)
- Great Man (1951)
- Casque d'Or (1952)
- In the Land of the Sun (1952)
- Alone in the World (1952)
- Les Vacances de Monsieur Hulot (1953)
- The Merchant of Venice (1953)
- The Big Flag (1954)
- Mourez, nous ferons le reste (1954)
- The Great Bulwark (1954)

== Bibliography ==
- Crisp, C.G. The Classic French Cinema, 1930-1960. Indiana University Press, 1993
- Slide, Anthony. The New Historical Dictionary of the American Film Industry. Routledge, 2014.
