= Secret Documents =

1945 film

- Directed by: Léo Joannon
- Written by: Jacques Companéez; Léopold Marchand
- Produced by: Roger De Venloo; Raymond Eger
- Starring: Marie Déa; Raymond Rouleau; Hugo Haas
- Cinematography: Nikolai Toporkoff
- Edited by: Andrée Danis
- Music by: Georges Derveaux
- Production companies: Compagnie Française Cinématographique; Majestic Films
- Distributed by: Sirius Films
- Release date: 30 May 1945
- Running time: 100 minutes
- Country: France
- Language: French

Secret Documents (French: Documents secrets) is a 1945 French spy thriller film directed by Léo Joannon and starring Marie Déa, Raymond Rouleau and Hugo Haas. It was shot in 1940 during the Phoney War but was halted by the German invasion and its release delayed until after the Liberation. The film's sets were designed by the art director Émile Duquesne.

== Synopsis ==
Rival spy networks battle over secret documents containing the formula for a vital new form of fuel.

== Cast ==
- Marie Déa as Steffi
- Raymond Rouleau as Radlo
- Hugo Haas as Morenius
- Henry Bonvallet
- Jean Brochard
- Rivers Cadet
- Arthur Devère
- Paul Lluís
- Marcelle Monthil
- Roland Toutain

== Bibliography ==
- Barrot, Olivier & Chirat, Raymond. Noir et blanc: 250 acteurs du cinéma français, 1930-1960. Flammarion, 2000.
- Rège, Philippe. Encyclopedia of French Film Directors, Volume 1. Scarecrow Press, 2009.
