= André Paulvé =

French film producer (1898–1982)

- Born: 30 October 1898; Seignelay, Yonne, France
- Died: 8 July 1982 aged (83); Paris, France
- Occupation: Producer
- Years active: 1938–1954 (film)

André Paulvé (30 October 1898 – 8 July 1982) was a French film producer. He established his own production and distribution company DisCina with Michel Safra in 1938. During the German Occupation of France after 1940 he based himself at Nice in the Unoccupied Zone. He was a pioneer in co-productions with Italy, establishing a link with the Cinecitta Studios in Rome.

== Selected filmography ==
- Rendez-vous Champs-Elysées (1937)
- Conflict (1938)
- Gibraltar (1938)
- Angelica (1939)
- Serge Panine (1939)
- Personal Column (1939)
- Beating Heart (1940)
- La Comédie du bonheur (1940)
- Vingt-quatre heures de perm' (1940)
- First Ball (1941)
- Foolish Husbands (1941)
- Macao (1942)
- Carmen (1942)
- The Murderer is Afraid at Night (1942)
- Les Visiteurs du Soir (1942)
- The Snow on the Footsteps (1942)
- Summer Light (1943)
- The Mysteries of Paris (1943)
- The Eternal Return (1943)
- Children of Paradise (1945)
- La Vie de bohème (1945)
- Mademoiselle X (1945)
- Box of Dreams (1945)
- Beauty and the Beast (1946)
- Strange Fate (1946)
- Sylvie and the Ghost (1946)
- The Damned (1947)
- The Sharks of Gibraltar (1947)
- Something to Sing About (1947)
- The Charterhouse of Parma (1948)
- Rocambole (1948)
- Du Guesclin (1948)
- The Revenge of Baccarat (1948)
- Ruy Blas (1948)
- All Roads Lead to Rome (1949)
- Jour de fête (1949)
- The King (1949)
- Lady Paname (1950)
- Orpheus (1950)
- Just Me (1950)
- Manèges (1950)
- Farewell Mister Grock (1950)
- Great Man (1951)
- Casque d'Or (1952)
- Alone in the World (1952)
- Flesh and the Woman (1954)
- The Big Flag (1954)

== Bibliography ==
- Crisp, C.G. The Classic French Cinema, 1930-1960. Indiana University Press, 1993.
- Hayward, Susan & Vincendeau, Ginette . French Film: Texts and Contexts. Psychology Press, 2000.
- Turk, Edward Baron . Child of Paradise: Marcel Carné and the Golden Age of French Cinema. Harvard University Press, 1989.
