= 56 Rue Pigalle =

1949 film

- Directed by: Willy Rozier
- Written by: Willy Rozier
- Produced by: Willy Rozier; Paul Wagner
- Starring: Jacques Dumesnil; Marie Déa; Aimé Clariond
- Cinematography: Fred Langenfeld
- Edited by: Linette Nicolas
- Music by: Jean Yatove
- Production company: Sport Films
- Distributed by: Astoria Films
- Release date: 18 March 1949
- Running time: 88 minutes
- Country: France
- Language: French

56 Rue Pigalle is a 1949 French crime drama film directed by Willy Rozier and starring Jacques Dumesnil, Marie Déa and Aimé Clariond. It has been classified as a film noir. It was shot at the Victorine Studios and on location around Nice.

== Synopsis ==
Jean Vigneron, a famous yachtsman, is in love with Inès the wife of his best friend. They are blackmailed due to incriminating letters being stolen by a valet living in the Rue Pigalle. When he is found murdered suspicion inevitably points at Vigneron. He flees to the French Congo, until he is absolved by a surprise witness.

== Cast ==
- Jacques Dumesnil as Jean Vigneron
- Marie Déa as Inès de Montalban
- Aimé Clariond as Ricardo de Montalban
- Raymond Cordy as Le chauffeur de taxi
- Janine Miller as Nadia, la chanteuse
- René Blancard as Lucien Bonnet
- Jean Geoffroy as Baruch
- Marco Villa as Fred Poulain
- Denyse Roux as Janis
- Lucien Callamand as Le procureur

== Bibliography ==
- Spicer, Andrew. European Film Noir. Manchester University Press, 2019.
