= Malaria (1943 film) =

1943 film

- Directed by: Jean Gourguet
- Written by: Paul Achard; Jean Gourguet; Émile Roussel; Georges Vally
- Produced by: Jean Gourguet; Paul Tissier
- Starring: Mireille Balin; Sessue Hayakawa; Jacques Dumesnil
- Cinematography: Georges Million
- Edited by: Émilienne Bigand
- Music by: Arthur Hoérée
- Production company: Union Française de Production Cinématographique
- Distributed by: Societe d'Edition et de Location de Films
- Release date: 30 June 1943
- Running time: 90 minutes
- Country: France
- Language: French

Malaria is a 1943 French drama film directed by Jean Gourguet and starring Mireille Balin, Sessue Hayakawa and Jacques Dumesnil.

The film's sets were designed by the art director Robert Dumesnil.

== Synopsis ==
In the French colonial empire a love triangle develops between two men and a woman. She begins having an affair with a man who promises to take her back to Europe and away from the tropical colony which she finds like a prison. However a native servant overhears them and then mysteriously disappears, leading to suspicions of murders.

== Cast ==
- Mireille Balin as Madeleine Barral
- Sessue Hayakawa as Saïdi
- Jacques Dumesnil as Jean Barral
- Jean Debucourt as Le docteur Cyril
- Michel Vitold as Henri Malfas
- Alexandre Rignault as Le père Dalmar
- Charles Lemontier as Ginès
- Marcel Maupi as Zanzi
- Paul Demange as Moniz
- Michel Salina as Dago
- François Viguier as Kilouaki

== Bibliography ==
- Kennedy-Karpat, Colleen. Rogues, Romance, and Exoticism in French Cinema of the 1930s. Fairleigh Dickinson, 2013.
