= Michel Safra =

Russian-born French film producer

- Born: 16 May 1899; Kiev, Russian Empire
- Died: 23 September 1967 (aged 68); Paris, France
- Occupation: Producer
- Years active: 1932–1967 (film)

Michel Safra (1899–1967) was a Russian-born French film producer. He was born in the Ukrainian city of Kiev, then part of the Russian Empire. After working in the German cinema for a decade during the silent era, during the early 1930s he began producing films in the French film industry.

In 1938 he established the production and distribution company DisCina with André Paulvé and produced around thirty films until his death in 1967. He was part of a sizeable contingent of Russian-born figures working in the French film industry during the era.

== Selected filmography ==
- In the Service of the Tsar (1936)
- Personal Column (1939)
- The Sharks of Gibraltar (1947)
- The King (1949)
- All Roads Lead to Rome (1949)
- Lady Paname (1950)
- Just Me (1950)
- Pleasures of Paris (1952)
- Flesh and the Woman (1954)
- Black Dossier (1955)
- Paris, Palace Hotel (1956)
- A Kiss for a Killer (1957)
- Magnificent Sinner (1959)
- Shéhérazade (1963)
- Gibraltar (1964)
- The Diabolical Dr. Z (1967)

== Bibliography ==
- Crisp, C.G. The Classic French Cinema, 1930-1960. Indiana University Press, 1993
