= Beating Heart (film) =

1940 film

- Theatrical release poster
- Directed by: Henri Decoin
- Written by: Hans Wilhelm; Max Kolpé; Michel Duran
- Produced by: André Paulvé; Gregor Rabinovitch
- Starring: Danielle Darrieux; Claude Dauphin; André Luguet
- Cinematography: André Germain; Robert Lefebvre
- Edited by: René Le Hénaff
- Music by: Paul Misraki
- Production company: Ciné-Alliance
- Distributed by: DisCina
- Release date: 3 February 1940
- Running time: 97 minutes
- Country: France
- Language: French

Beating Heart (French: Battement de coeur) is a 1940 French comedy film directed by Henri Decoin and starring Danielle Darrieux, Claude Dauphin and André Luguet. It was shot at the Billancourt Studios in Paris. The film' sets were designed by the art directors Léon Barsacq and Jean Perrier. It was inspired by the 1939 Italian film Heartbeat. The film was remade in Hollywood as Heartbeat in 1946 starring Ginger Rogers and Basil Rathbone.

== Synopsis ==
It tells the story of a young woman escaping from reform school who tries to steal a foreign ambassador's watch but ends up falling in love with him.

== Cast ==
- Danielle Darrieux as Arlette
- Claude Dauphin as Pierre de Rougemont
- André Luguet as Le comte d'Argay - l'ambassadeur
- Junie Astor as La comtesse Florence d'Argay - l'ambassadrice
- Charles Dechamps as Le baron Dvorak
- Sylvain Itkine as Le premier voleur
- Pierre Feuillère as Le second voleur
- Jean Hébey as Ponthus
- Julien Carette as Yves Calubert
- Jean Tissier as Roland Médeville
- Saturnin Fabre as Monsieur Aristide
- Roland Armontel as Firmin
- Marguerite de Morlaye as La dame au bal
- Dora Doll as La secrétaire
- Jean Joffre as Le maire
- Marcelle Monthil as Madame Aristide
- Geneviève Morel as Marinette - une élève
- André Nicolle as L'inspecteur
- Robert Ozanne as L'adjoint au maire
- Sylvain as Le témoin de Roland

== Bibliography ==
- Affron, Charles; Affron, Mirella Jona (2009-08-14). Best Years: Going to the Movies, 1945-1946. Rutgers University Press. ISBN 978-0-8135-4845-6.
