= The Great Pack =

1945 film by Jean de Limur

- Directed by: Jean de Limur
- Written by: André Legrand
- Based on: La Grande Meute by Paul Vialar
- Produced by: Pierre Guerlais; Adrien Remaugé
- Starring: Jacques Dumesnil; Aimé Clariond; Jacqueline Porel
- Cinematography: Charles Suin
- Edited by: Henri Taverna
- Music by: René Cloërec
- Production company: Industrie Cinématographique
- Distributed by: Pathé Consortium Cinéma
- Release date: 18 July 1945
- Running time: 105 minutes
- Country: France
- Language: French

The Great Pack (French: La Grande Meute) is a 1945 French drama film directed by Jean de Limur and starring Jacques Dumesnil, Aimé Clariond and Jacqueline Porel. The film recorded admissions in France of 1,754,414. It was shot at the Francoeur and Joinville Studios in Paris. The film's sets were designed by the art director Robert-Jules Garnier.

== Synopsis ==
The title refers to a pack of dogs inherited by Côme de Lambrefaut through the family mansion on the death of his father. Everything else apart from the 110 hunting dogs has been mortgaged. He marries Agnès de Charençay, who shares his enthusiasm for the hunt, but this leads to the death of their son and hopes of descendants. Agnès divorces and marries a man whose wealth helps her to humiliate Côme, by buying his debts, slowly acquiring everything. In September 1939, the house is destroyed by gunfire and the dogs all escape.

== Cast ==
- Jacques Dumesnil as Côme de Lambrefaut
- Aimé Clariond as Martin du Bocage
- Jacqueline Porel as Agnès de Charançay
- Jean Brochard as Maître Marvault
- Suzanne Dantès as La marquise de Badoul
- Paulette Élambert as Laurette
- Jean Dasté as L'huissier
- Guy Decomble as Me Frouas
- Camille Guérini as La Ramée
- Julienne Paroli as Sylvie
- Maurice Schutz as Patrice de Lambrefaut
- Paul Villé as Le curé
- Paul Barge
- Ketty Kerviel
- Frédéric Mariotti
- Moriss

== Bibliography ==
- Spears, Jack. Hollywood: the Golden Era. A.S. Barnes, 1971.
