= Lady Paname =

1950 film

- Film poster
- Directed by: Henri Jeanson
- Written by: Henri Jeanson
- Produced by: André Paulvé; Michel Safra
- Starring: Louis Jouvet; Suzy Delair; Henri Guisol; Henri Crémieux
- Cinematography: Robert Lefebvre
- Edited by: Roger Dwyre
- Music by: Georges Van Parys
- Production company: Spéva Films
- Distributed by: DisCina
- Release date: 26 May 1950
- Running time: 113 minutes
- Country: France
- Language: French

Lady Paname is a 1950 French comedy film directed and written by Henri Jeanson and starring Louis Jouvet, Suzy Delair, Henri Guisol and Henri Crémieux. It tells the story of a young female singer who tries to become a star in the music hall world of the 1920s and falls in love with a composer. It was shot at the Boulogne Studios in Paris. The film's sets were designed by the art director Jean d'Eaubonne with costumes by Georges Annenkov.

== Plot ==
The evocation of 1920s Paris mingles with the rapid rise of the irresistible Caprice, a talented singer, and her tumultuous love affair with Jeff the composer. A photographer nicknamed Bagnolet, a gentle anarchist, keeps a gentle eye on Caprice's activities as she becomes Lady Paname, and in the absence of morals, makes love triumph.

== Cast ==
- Louis Jouvet as Gambier, dit Bagnolet - un photographe anarchiste
- Suzy Delair as Raymonde Bosset, dite Caprice - une chanteuse de music-hall
- Henri Guisol as Jeff - un compositeur de chansons
- Henri Crémieux as Milson - le directeur de l'Olympia
- Raymond Souplex as Arsène Marval - un chanteur célèbre et cabotin
- Jane Marken as Madame Gambier
- Claire Olivier as Léa Bosset - la mère de Caprice et de Marcel
- Camille Guérini as Auguste Bosset
- Véra Norman as La môme Oseille - l'amie de Caprice
- Monique Mélinand as Costa - l'accompagnatrice
- Germaine Montero as Mary-Flor - une chanteuse finie mais capricieuse
- Huguette Faget as Janine
- Georges Douking as Le parlementaire - un ami de Fred
- Maurice Régamey as Fred
- Odette Laure as La grue
- Odette Barencey as La dame des toilettes
- Jane Helly as Madame Marval - la femme du chanteur
- Maurice Nasil as Chacaton
- Albert Valsien as Le chef d'orchestre
- Sylvain as Un ami
- Jean Berton as Le régisseur
- Mag-Avril as L'habilleuse

== Bibliography ==
- Crisp, Colin. French Cinema—A Critical Filmography: Volume 2, 1940–1958. Indiana University Press, 2015.
