= Maurice Constantin-Weyer =

French writer (1881–1964)

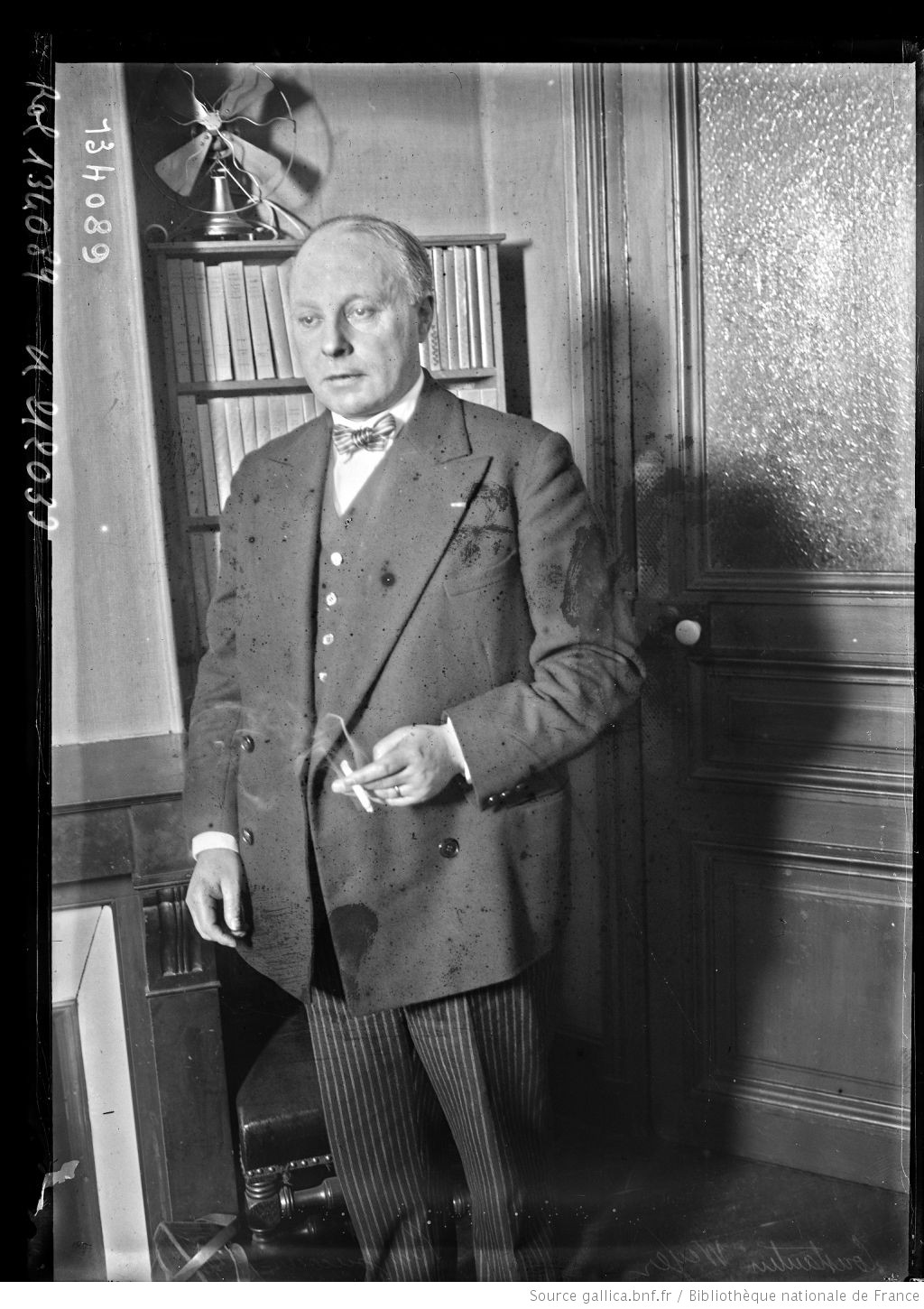
Maurice Constantin-Weyer

Maurice Constantin-Weyer (French pronunciation: [mɔʁis kɔ̃stɑ̃tɛ̃ vɛjɛʁ]; 24 April 1881, Bourbonne-les-Bains, Haute-Marne – 22 October 1964, Vichy, Allier) was a French writer. His best known novel is Un homme se penche sur son passé, Prix Goncourt 1928 (tr.: A Man Scans His Past, 1929).

== Biography ==
A novelist, biographer and essayist, Constantin lived ten years in Canada (Manitoba) between 1904 and 1914 and this adventurous period fed a big part of his later work written in France between 1920 and 1950. Maurice Constantin-Weyer was a successful writer, best known for his novels of adventure: the most emblematic is Un homme se penche sur son passé (A man scans his past), which won the Prix Goncourt in 1928, and whose action takes place in large areas of the Prairie and northern Canada in the early twentieth century.

He returned to France in 1914 to fight in World War I, where he was often wounded and decorated (Verdun – Salonique...). After the war he became a journalist and published novels and biographies in France.

His original last name was only "Constantin"; he added the name of his second wife in 1920 and signed all his works Maurice Constantin-Weyer.

== Bibliography ==
For complete list see the French Wikipedia.

English translations :

- A Man Scans His Past, 1929 (Un homme se penche sur son passé, 1928)
- The Half Breed /A Martyr's Folly 1930 - fictionalized biography of Louis Riel (La Bourrasque, 1925)
- Towards the West, 1931 (Vers l'ouest, 1921)
- The French Adventurer; The Life and Exploits of LaSalle, 1931 (Cavalier de La Salle, 1927)
- Forest Wild, 1932 (Clairière, 1929 )
