= Monsieur La Souris =

1942 film

- Directed by: Georges Lacombe
- Written by: Marcel Achard
- Based on: Monsieur La Souris by Georges Simenon
- Produced by: Roger Richebé
- Starring: Raimu; Aimé Clariond; Micheline Francey
- Cinematography: Victor Arménise
- Edited by: Raymond Leboursier
- Music by: Georges Auric
- Production company: Films Roger Richebé
- Distributed by: Films Roger Richebé
- Release date: 14 October 1942
- Running time: 106 minutes
- Country: France
- Language: French

Monsieur La Souris is a 1942 French mystery crime film directed by Georges Lacombe and starring Raimu, Aimé Clariond and Micheline Francey. It is based on the 1938 novel of the same title by Georges Simenon. The film's sets were designed by the art director Jacques Krauss. The novel was later adapted into the 1950 British film Midnight Episode.

== Cast ==
- Raimu as Monsieur La Souris
- Aimé Clariond as Simon Negretti
- René Bergeron as L'inspecteur Lognon
- Paul Amiot as Le commissaire Lucas
- Pierre Jourdan as Frédéric Muller
- Marcel Melrac as Jim
- Jo Dervo as Fred
- Micheline Francey as Lucile Boisvin
- Marie Carlot as Dora
- Charles Granval as Laborde
- Gilbert Gil as Christian Osting
- Raymond Aimos as Cupidon

== Bibliography ==
- Bessy, Maurice & Chirat, Raymond. Histoire du cinéma français: encyclopédie des films, 1940–1950. Pygmalion, 1986.
- Goble, Alan. The Complete Index to Literary Sources in Film. Walter de Gruyter, 1999.
- Rège, Philippe. Encyclopedia of French Film Directors, Volume 1. Scarecrow Press, 2009.
