= Berlingot and Company =

1939 film

- Directed by: Fernand Rivers
- Written by: Jean Manse
- Produced by: Fernand Rivers
- Starring: Fernandel; Suzy Prim; Fernand Charpin
- Cinematography: Jean Bachelet
- Edited by: Jacques Desagneaux
- Music by: Roger Dumas
- Production company: Les Films Fernand Rivers
- Distributed by: D.U.C.
- Release date: 27 April 1939
- Running time: 85 minutes
- Country: France
- Language: French

Berlingot and Company (French: Berlingot et compagnie) is a 1939 French comedy film directed by Fernand Rivers and starring Fernandel, Suzy Prim and Fernand Charpin. It was shot at Marcel Pagnol's Marseille Studios. The film's sets were designed by the art director René Renoux.

== Cast ==
- Fernandel as François, vendeur de berlingots
- Fernand Charpin as Victor, l'associé de François
- Suzy Prim as Isabelle Granville
- Fréhel as Bohémia
- Jean Brochard as Le directeur de l'asile
- Rivers Cadet as Le lutteur
- Monique Bert as Thérèse
- Édouard Delmont as Courtepatte
- Jean Témerson as Un client du café
- Josselyne Lane as Lisa
- René Alié as Dédé
- Marco Behar as Le fou
- Jacques Servière as Gaston
- Fernand Flament as Paulo
- Le petit Jacky as La petite Gisèle
- Marcel Maupi as Isidore
- Marguerite Chabert

== Bibliography ==
- Crisp, C.G. Genre, Myth, and Convention in the French Cinema, 1929-1939. Indiana University Press, 2002.
