= Les Visiteurs du Soir =

- Theatrical release poster
- Directed by: Marcel Carné
- Written by: Pierre Laroche; Jacques Prévert
- Produced by: André Paulvé
- Starring: Arletty; Jules Berry; Marie Déa; Marcel Herrand; Fernand Ledoux; Alain Cuny
- Cinematography: Roger Hubert
- Edited by: Henri Rust
- Music by: Maurice Thiriet
- Distributed by: DisCina
- Release date: December 5, 1942
- Running time: 118 min.
- Country: France
- Language: French

Les Visiteurs du Soir (US: The Devil's Envoys) is a 1942 film by French film director Marcel Carné. The film was released on 5 December 1942 in Paris during the Nazi occupation.

== Plot ==
In May 1485, two of the devil's envoys, Gilles (Alain Cuny) and Dominique (Arletty), arrive at the castle of Baron Hugues (Fernand Ledoux) on the night of a celebration for his daughter's engagement. The Baron's daughter, Anne (Marie Déa), is set to marry Renaud (Marcel Herrand), a warlord who prefers talking about battle more than reciting love poems. Disguised as traveling minstrels, Gilles and Dominique enter the castle and use their powers of enticement to ruin the upcoming nuptials. Gilles seduces the innocent Anne, while both the Baron and Renaud become bewitched with Dominique. But, when Gilles accidentally falls in love with Anne, the Devil (Jules Berry) arrives to ensure that any true happiness is destroyed. When Gilles and Anne are caught together in her room, Gilles is thrown into the dungeon, and Anne and Renaud's engagement is called off.

When the Baron and Renaud realize that they are both in love with Dominique, they duel to the death and Renaud is killed. Following the Devil's orders, Dominique leaves the castle and entices the Baron to follow her in suit. Intrigued by Anne's unusual purity and faith in love, the Devil decides he wants Anne for himself. Making a deal with the Devil, Anne agrees to be with him in return for the Devil releasing Gilles from chains. Once Gilles is free, the Devil strips Gilles of his memory and Gilles walks off leaving Anne with the Devil. But, once Gilles is gone, Anne reveals that she lied and that she could never love the Devil. Returning to the fountain where she and Gilles first pronounced their love, Anne and Gilles reunite and through the power of love, Gilles recovers his memory. Finding the two once again in love, the Devil changes them both into statues, but finds that, even underneath stone, their hearts continue to beat.

== Cast ==
- Arletty as Dominique, a minstrel
- Alain Cuny as Gilles, a minstrel
- Jules Berry as the Devil
- Marie Déa as Anne Hugues
- Fernand Ledoux as Baron Hugues, Anne's father
- Marcel Herrand as Baron Renaud, Anne's fiance
- Pierre Labry as the Lord
- Jean d'Yd as the playboy
- Roger Blin as the monster showman
- Gabriel Gabrio as the executioner
- Simone Signoret as plain maid made beautiful by Gilles

== Production ==
The film was shot in Nice, in Vichy France, and due to the war, Carné faced a number of difficulties in making the film. Due to the increased censorship during the war, Carné wanted to make a historical and fantastical film that would have little difficulty with the censors.

== Reception ==
The film premiered at Paris’s Madeleine Cinema on 4 December 1942 and was one of the biggest film events during the war. It was called "the grandest film of the Occupation." One of the reasons that the film was such a huge success was murmuring before the film was released that the film was an allegory for the current situation. Many people saw the character of the Devil as representing Hitler and the continued beating hearts of the lovers as representing France living under German rule, but not giving up hope. Carné maintained until his death that the film was not an intentional allegory for the war and that any relationship was purely unconscious.
