= Jacques de Casembroot =

Belgian film director

- Born: 19 November 1903; Brussels, Belgium
- Died: 1 January 1988 (aged 84); France
- Occupations: Director, Writer, Editor
- Years active: 1928–1965 (film)

Jacques de Casembroot (1903–1988) was a Belgian film director and screenwriter who settled and worked in France. Which much of his work was in the documentary field, he also directed or scripted several feature films.

== Selected filmography ==
- Le perroquet vert (1929)
- The Last Night (1934)
- The Guardian Angel (1942)
- The Golden Age (1942)
- Jericho (1946)
- Third at Heart (1947)
- Mystery in Shanghai (1950)
- Jocelyn (1952)

== Bibliography ==
- Rège, Philippe . Encyclopedia of French Film Directors, Volume 1. Scarecrow Press, 2009.
