= La Loi du Nord =

La Loi du nord
- Theatrical release poster
- Directed by: Jacques Feyder
- Written by: Jacques Feyder; Alexandre Arnoux; Charles Spaak; Maurice Constantin-Weyer (novel)
- Produced by: Roland Tual
- Starring: Michèle Morgan; Pierre Richard-Willm; Charles Vanel
- Cinematography: Jean Charpentier; Paul Fabian; Roger Hubert
- Edited by: Roger Spiri-Mercaton
- Music by: Louis Beydts
- Production company: Filmos
- Distributed by: DisCina
- Release date: 1939
- Running time: 95 minutes
- Country: France
- Language: French

La Loi du nord ([la lwa dy nɔʁ], "The Law of the North"; also called La Piste du Nord, "The Northern Trail") is a 1939 French adventure drama film directed by Jacques Feyder who co-wrote screenplay with Alexandre Arnoux and Charles Spaak, based on novel "Telle qu'elle était de son vivant" by Maurice Constantin-Weyer. The films stars Michèle Morgan, Pierre Richard-Willm and Charles Vanel. It tells the story of an escaped prisoner, his woman secretary and two guardsmen in the Far North. It was entered for the Grand Prix du Festival International du Film at the 1939 Cannes Film Festival.

== Plot ==
Robert Shaw manslaughters his wife's lover and runs away with his secretary Jacqueline. Helped by a French trapper who takes them for film-makers, they hide in Northern Canada. But the corporal Dalrymple discovers their identity and hunts them, until Jacqueline dies exhausted by such a hard expedition.

== Cast ==
- Michèle Morgan as Jacqueline
- Pierre Richard-Willm as Robert Shaw
- Charles Vanel as Corporal Dalrymple
- Max Michel as the Advocate
- Youcca Troubetzkov as Ellis
- Fabien Loris as Daugh
