= The Newspaper Falls at Five O'Clock =

1942 film

- Directed by: Georges Lacombe
- Written by: Oscar Paul Gilbert; André Legrand
- Produced by: Alain Poiré
- Starring: Pierre Fresnay; Marie Déa; Pierre Renoir
- Cinematography: Fédote Bourgasoff
- Edited by: Raymond Leboursier
- Music by: Arthur Honegger
- Production company: Société Nouvelle des Établissements Gaumont
- Distributed by: Compagnie Parisienne de Location de Films
- Release date: 21 May 1942
- Running time: 92 minutes
- Country: France
- Language: French

The Newspaper Falls at Five O'Clock (French: Le journal tombe à cinq heures) is a 1942 French drama film directed by Georges Lacombe and starring Pierre Fresnay, Marie Déa and Pierre Renoir. It was shot at the Saint-Maurice Studios in Paris. The film's sets were designed by the art director Jean Perrier.

== Cast ==
- Pierre Fresnay as Le reporter Pierre Rabaud
- Marie Déa as Hélène Perrin
- Pierre Renoir as François Marchal
- Pierre Larquey as Phalanpin
- Marcel Vallée as Valentin
- Fred Pasquali as Fragonard
- Bernard Blier as André Bertod
- René Génin as Bedu
- Jean Brochard as Meulon dit Borniol
- Louis Salou asPerrier des Gachons
- Tania Fédor as Claudette Louvois
- Jacqueline Gauthier as Perrette
- Arlette Marchal as Jeanne Marchal
- Elisa Ruis as Annette Michon
- Héléna Manson as Marie Le Goard
- Gabrielle Dorziat as Mademoiselle Lebeau
- Maurice Dorléac as Georges Lefèvre
- Jean Carmet as Un typographe
- Lucien Coëdel as Le capitaine Le Goard
- Pierre Labry as Romain
- Marcel Pérès as Requin
- Noël Roquevert as Le capitaine Le Goff

== Bibliography ==
- Rège, Philippe. Encyclopedia of French Film Directors, Volume 1. Scarecrow Press, 2009.
- Siclier, Jacques. La France de Pétain et son cinéma. H. Veyrier, 1981.
