= Case of Conscience =

1939 film

- Directed by: Walter Kapps
- Written by: Léopold Gomez
- Produced by: Jacques Haïk
- Starring: Suzy Prim; Jules Berry; Roger Karl
- Cinematography: Henri Barreyre
- Edited by: Boris Des Aubrys; Maurice Serein
- Music by: Marcel Kapps
- Production company: Société Cas de Conscience
- Distributed by: Les Films Cristal
- Release date: 18 May 1939
- Running time: 86 minutes
- Country: France
- Language: French

Case of Conscience (French: Cas de conscience) is a 1939 French drama film directed by Walter Kapps and starring Suzy Prim, Jules Berry and Roger Karl. The film's sets were designed by the art directors Claude Bouxin and Roland Quignon.

== Synopsis ==
A doctor's pioneering research is put at jeopardy as he runs out of money. When a rich but miserly uncle comes to stay, he suffers a heart attack. The doctor chooses not to help him, leaving him to die. With his uncle's money he is able to complete his research, earning him great success, but filling him with a deep sense of remorse.

== Cast ==
- Suzy Prim as Madeleine Granval
- Jules Berry as Laurent Arnoux
- Roger Karl as Jacques Grandval
- Colette Darfeuil as Doriane
- Jean Tissier as Paul
- Jean Toulout as Roger Chapuis
- Tito Angelo as Le chanteur
- Albert Broquin as Le régisseur
- René Desormes as René, le doyen
- Nita Georges as La mère
- Charles Lemontier as Le reporter de Radio-Cité
- France Marionas Fernande Dupé
- Marthe Mussine as Pierrette
- André Nox as Le rapporteur
- Fred Poulin as Le speaker
- Roland Toutain as Normand - un journaliste

== Bibliography ==
- Bessy, Maurice & Chirat, Raymond. Histoire du cinéma français: 1935-1939. Pygmalion, 1986.
- Crisp, Colin. Genre, Myth and Convention in the French Cinema, 1929-1939. Indiana University Press, 2002.
- Rège, Philippe. Encyclopedia of French Film Directors, Volume 1. Scarecrow Press, 2009.
