= Angelica (1939 film) =

1939 film

- Directed by: Jean Choux
- Written by: Fabien Frachat; René Jolivet; Jean-Georges Auriol; Maria Basaglia; Jean Choux
- Based on: Les compagnons d'Ulysse by Pierre Benoît
- Produced by: André Paulvé
- Starring: Viviane Romance; Georges Flamant; Guillaume de Sax
- Cinematography: Ubaldo Arata
- Edited by: Eraldo Da Roma
- Music by: Jacques Ibert
- Production companies: DisCina; Scalera Film
- Distributed by: DisCina; Scalera Film
- Release date: 17 February 1939
- Running time: 95 minutes
- Countries: France; Italy
- Language: French

Angelica (French: Angélica, Italian: Rosa di sangue) is a 1939 French-Italian adventure film directed by Jean Choux and starring Viviane Romance, Georges Flamant and Guillaume de Sax. It is based on a novel by Pierre Benoît.

It was shot at the Scalera Studios in Rome. The film's sets were designed by the art directors Alfredo Manzi and Pierre Schild.

== Cast ==
- Viviane Romance as Angélica
- Georges Flamant as Dom Manrique Ruiz / Salvador
- Guillaume de Sax as Diaz
- Paul Amiot as Iramundi
- Marcelle Yrven as Yacca
- Geo Bury as Alvarez
- Raymond Galle as Ramirez
- Pierre Labry as L'officier
- Marcel Maupi as Domingo
- Monique Thibaut as Manuela

== Bibliography ==
- Goble, Alan. The Complete Index to Literary Sources in Film. Walter de Gruyter, 1999.
- Slavin, David Henry . Colonial Cinema and Imperial France, 1919–1939: White Blind Spots, Male Fantasies, Settler Myths. JHU Press, 2001.
