= Carmen (1942 film) =

1942 film

- Directed by: Christian-Jaque
- Written by: Prosper Merimee (novella); Christian-Jaque; Henri Jeanson; Pier Luigi Melani; Claude-André Puget; Charles Spaak; Jacques Viot
- Produced by: François Carron; André Paulvé
- Starring: Viviane Romance; Jean Marais; Lucien Coëdel
- Cinematography: Ubaldo Arata
- Edited by: Jacques Desagneaux; Jole Tonini
- Music by: Maurice-Paul Guillot
- Production companies: DisCina; Invicta Film; Scalera Film
- Distributed by: DisCina (France); Scalera Film (Italy)
- Release date: 8 August 1944
- Running time: 124 minutes
- Countries: France; Italy
- Language: French

Carmen is a French-Italian musical drama film directed by Christian-Jaque and starring Viviane Romance, Jean Marais and Lucien Coëdel. It is a version of the famous opera. Although filmed in 1942 it was not released until 1944 in France and 1945 in Italy.

It was one of the most popular movies in France in 1945 with admissions of 4,277,813.

The film's sets were designed by the art director Robert Gys. It was shot at the Scalera Studios in Rome.

== Cast ==
- Viviane Romance as Carmen
- Jean Marais as Don José
- Lucien Coëdel as Garcia
- Julien Bertheau as Lucas, le matador / Lucas, il matador
- Jean Brochard as Lillas-Pastia
- Georges Tourreil as Dancaire
- Adriano Rimoldi as Marquez, le lieutenant des Dragons / Marquez, il tenente dei Dragoni
- Elli Parvo as Pamela
- Mario Gallina as Un marchand / Un mercante
- Marguerite Moreno as La gitane / La zingara
- Bernard Blier as Remendado

== Bibliography ==
- Anat Zanger. Film Remakes as Ritual and Disguise: From Carmen to Ripley. Amsterdam University Press, 2006.
