= Jacques Dumesnil =

French actor (1903–1998)

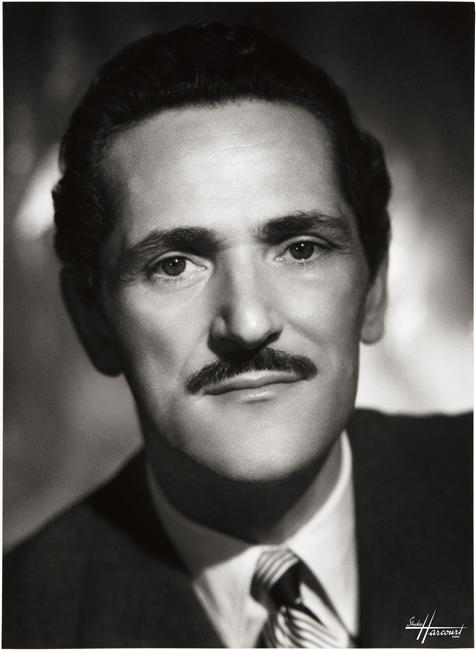
- Dumesnil in 1943
- Born: Marie Émile Eugène André Joly; 9 November 1903; Paris, France
- Died: 8 May 1998 (aged 94); Bron, Rhône, France
- Resting place: Miribel Cemetery, Miribel, Ain
- Other name: Jacques Joly
- Occupation: Actor
- Years active: 1928–1980
- Children: Pierre Joly dit Dumesnil

Jacques Dumesnil (born Marie Émile Eugène André Joly; 9 November 1903 – 8 May 1998) was a French film and television actor.

== Early life ==
Jacques Dumesnil was born as Marie Émile Eugène André Joly on 9 November 1903, in Paris, France. Before becoming an actor, he received training as a mechanical engineer. After starting as a secretary at the aviation school, he became an industrial designer, a profession he left to devote himself to the theater.

== Career ==
He adopted the pseudonym Dumesnil because of the admiration he had to French actor Camille Dumény.

He started out as a fanciful singer in a café located in Paris Place de l'Hôtel de Ville, he was paid in sandwiches and glasses of beer.

Dumesnil started on stage in 1927 and divided his career between theater and cinema. Having spent two years at the Comédie-Française, he played among other things in Les Tontons flingueurs and provided the French voice of Charlie Chaplin in Monsieur Verdoux (1947) and A King in New York (1957).

His role as Duke of Plessis-Vaudreuil in the television series Au plaisir de Dieu, earned him a resurgence of popularity and the 7 d'Or for best actor.

== Personal life ==
Jacques Dumesnil had a son, Pierre Joly dit Dumesnil, who was a French swimming champion and participated in the 1952 Summer Olympics in Helsinki, Finland.

== Death ==
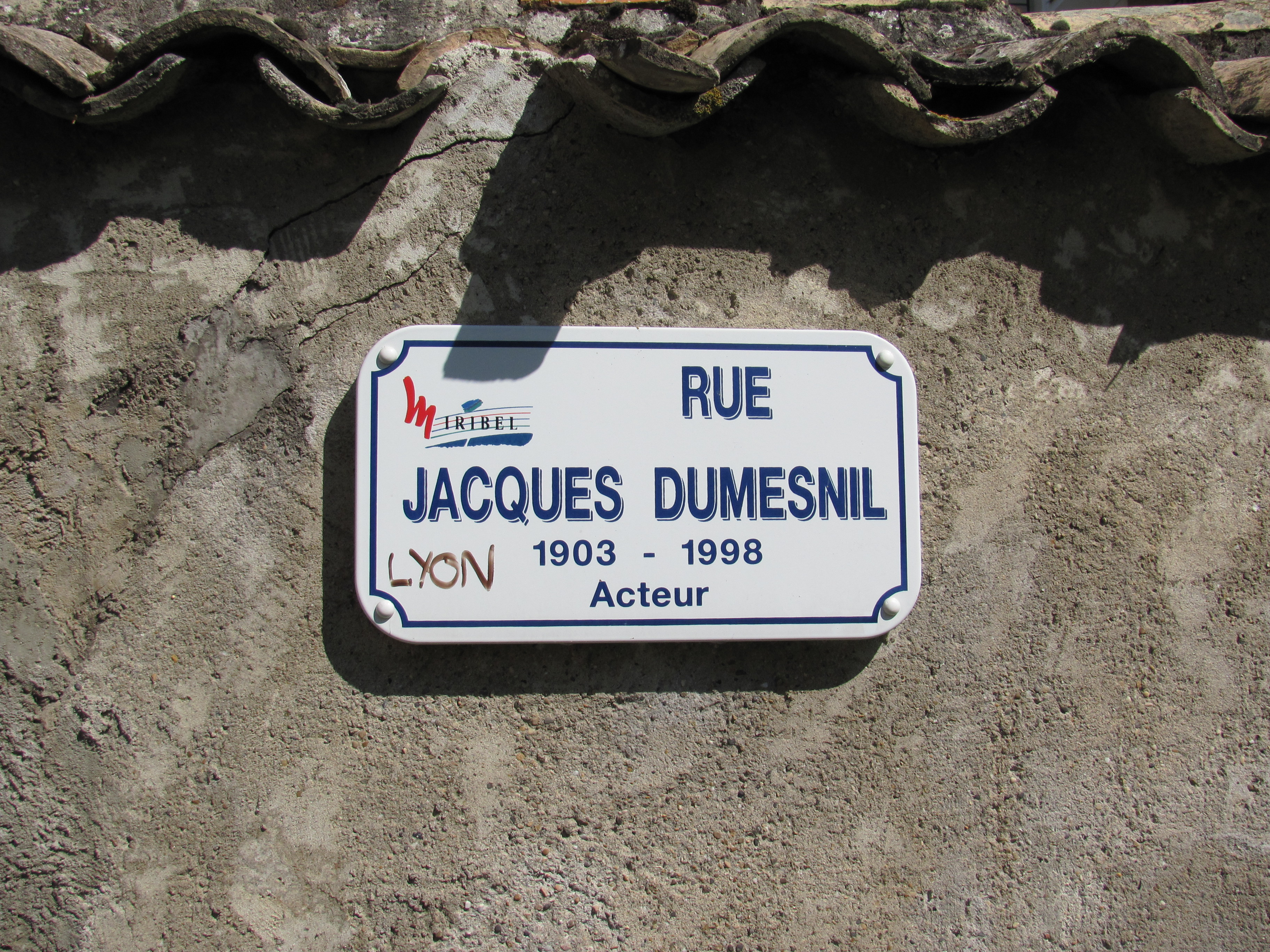
Jacques-Dumesnil street at Miribel, Ain.

Dumesnil died on 8 May 1998 in Bron, Rhône. He was buried three days later in the Miribel Cemetery in Miribel, Ain, the town where his sister Odette Joly had been a teacher and where he had chosen to study. install at the end of its life. Since then, a rue de Miribel has also been called “rue Jacques-Dumesnil”.

== Filmography ==
Year	Title	Role	Notes
1932	Mon amant l'assassin	Bondizi	
1932	Danton	Fabre d'Églantine	
1933	Rivaux de la piste	Banz	
1933	The Ironmaster	Le duc Gaston de Bligny	
1934	Beauty of the Night	Jean Fournier	
1934	Gold	Malescot	French-language version
1934	Three Sailors	Stephen Warren	
1934	Le Roi des Champs-Élysées	Un gangster	
1935	Un homme de trop à bord	Clay	
1935	Lucrezia Borgia	Giannino Sforza, Duke of Milano	
1936	Bach the Detective	Stefani	
1937	Wells in Flames	Garcia	
1937	The Heart Disposes	Le baron Houzier	
1938	Rail Pirates	André Rolland	
1938	Women's Prison	L'avocat	
1938	Return at Dawn	Dick Farmer aka 'Keith'	
1939	Behind the Facade	Albert Durant, le jouer de poker	
1939	Yamilé sous les cèdres	Osman Hel Hussein	
1940	The Man from Niger	Le lieutenant Jacques Parent	
1940	L'Empreinte du dieu	Gomar	
1942	Bolero	Georges	
1942	Chiffon's Wedding	Max de Bray	
1942	Twisted Mistress	Guy Carbonnel	
1943	White Wings	Gérard Clairval	
1943	Secrets	Pierre	
1943	Malaria	Jean Barral	
1943	Pierre and Jean	Le docteur Henri Marchat	
1944	Sowing the Wind	Le sculpteur Bruno Horp	
1944	Le bal des passants	Claude Amadieu	
1944	Night Shift	Pierre Jansen	
1945	The Great Pack	Côme de Lambrefaut	
1945	Father Serge	Le prince Stéphane	
1946	Women's Games	Stanislas	
1947	Rumours	Jean	
1947	La dernière chevauchée	André Valérian	
1947	Les trafiquants de la mer	L'inspecteur principal Gardy	
1949	56 Rue Pigalle	Jean Vigneron	
1949	The Farm of Seven Sins	Paul-Louis Courier	
1950	Julie de Carneilhan	Léon de Carneilhan	
1951	Anna	Il professor Ferri	
1954	Ulysses	Alicinous	
1954	The Count of Bragelonne	d'Artagnan	
1955	Napoleon	Le maréchal Jean-Baptiste Bernadotte	
1956	If Paris Were Told to Us	Richelieu	
1956	Plucking the Daisy	General Dumont	
1956	Mitsou ou Comment l'esprit vient aux filles	Eugène	
1957	The Seventh Commandment	Gilbert Odet	
1958	Life Together	Le professeur Henri Girane	
1958	La p... sentimentale	Pierre Berger	
1960	La tricheuse	Le docteur Armand Merville	
1961	Famous Love Affairs	Maître Hans - le bourreau	(segment "Agnès Bernauer")
1961	¿Pena de muerte?	Padre de Pablo	
1962	First Criminal Brigade	Commissar Masson	
1962	Dossier 1413	Docteur Pira	
1962	La planque	Garnier - le directeur	
1963	Les Tontons flingueurs	Louis le Mexicain	
1964	Que personne ne sorte	Le directeur de la police	

== Bibliography ==
- Crisp, C.G. The classic French cinema, 1930-1960. Indiana University Press, 1993.
- Hayward, Susan. Simone Signoret: The Star as Cultural Sign. Continuum, 2004.
