= Roger Hubert =

French cinematographer

- Born: 30 March 1903; Montreuil-sous-Bois, France
- Died: 28 November 1964; Paris, France
- Occupation: Cinematographer

Roger Hubert (French pronunciation: [ʁɔʒe ybɛʁ]; 1903–1964) was a French cinematographer who worked on more than 90 films.

== Selected filmography ==
- The Red Inn (1923)
- Sables (1927)
- Paris-New York-Paris (1928)
- The Lovers of Midnight (1931)
- End of the World (1931)
- American Love (1931)
- Fanny (1932)
- Baleydier (1932)
- Jocelyn (1933)
- The Lady of the Camellias (1934)
- The Battle (1934)
- Hotel Free Exchange (1934)
- Pension Mimosas (1935)
- Lucrezia Borgia (1935)
- Remous (1935)
- Divine (1935)
- The Man of the Hour (1937)
- The Woman Thief (1938)
- Beautiful Star (1938)
- The Little Thing (1938)
- Paris-New York (1940)
- First Ball (1941)
- Foolish Husbands (1941)
- The Woman I Loved Most (1942)
- Les Visiteurs du Soir (1942)
- The Phantom Baron (1943)
- Children of Paradise (1945)
- La Fiancée des ténèbres (1945)
- The Queen's Necklace (1946)
- Mirror (1947)
- The Last Days of Pompeii (1950)
- The Lovers of Bras-Mort (1951)
- Judgement of God (1952)
- Leathernose (1952)
- Desperate Decision (1952)
- Thérèse Raquin (1953)
- The Air of Paris (1954)
- Queen Margot (1954)
- The Lovers of Lisbon (1955)
- Élisa (1957)
- Paris Holiday (1958)
- White Cargo (1958)
- The Big Chief (1959)
- Croesus (1960)
- Bombs on Monte Carlo (1960)
- Dynamite Jack (1961)
- Cocagne (1961)

== Bibliography ==
- Oscherwitz, Dayna & Higgins, MaryEllen. The A to Z of French Cinema. Scarecrow Press, 2009.
