= Odette Barencey =

French actress (1893–1981)

- Born: 20 August 1893; Paris, France
- Died: 4 March 1981 (aged 87); Lyon, France
- Occupation: Actress
- Years active: 1921–1973

Odette Barencey (20 August 1893 – 4 March 1981) was a French film actress. She appeared in more than 50 films from 1927 to 1958. She was married to the actor Marcel Barencey.

== Selected filmography ==
- My Childish Father (1930)
- Moon Over Morocco (1931)
- Montmartre (1931)
- The Faceless Voice (1933)
- The Last of the Six (1941)
- Notre-Dame de la Mouise (1941)
- The Blue Veil (1942)
- Love Marriage (1942)
- The Stairs Without End (1943)
- Traveling Light (1944)
- A Friend Will Come Tonight (1946)
- Land Without Stars (1946)
- The Lovers of Pont Saint Jean (1947)
- Mirror (1947)
- Sybille's Night (1947)
- Convicted (1948)
- The Cupid Club (1949)
- Lady Paname (1950)
- Just Me (1950)
- Paris Vice Squad (1951)
- My Seal and Them (1951)
- Passion (1951)
- My Friend Oscar (1951)
- The Case Against X (1952)
- The Red Head (1952)
- The Sparrows of Paris (1953)
- Little Jacques (1953)
- Their Last Night (1953)
- Flesh and the Woman (1954)
- Madelon (1955)
- The Whole Town Accuses (1956)
- Girl and the River (1958)
