= Personal Column (film) =

- Directed by: Robert Siodmak
- Written by: Jacques Companéez; Simon Gantillon; Ernst Neubach
- Produced by: André Paulvé; Michel Safra
- Starring: Maurice Chevalier; Pierre Renoir; Marie Déa; Erich von Stroheim
- Cinematography: Marcel Fradetal; Michel Kelber; Jacques Mercanton
- Edited by: Yvonne Martin
- Music by: Michel Michelet
- Production company: Spéva Films
- Distributed by: DisCina
- Release date: 5 December 1939
- Running time: 106 minutes
- Country: France
- Language: French

Personal Column (French: Pièges) is a 1939 French thriller film directed by Robert Siodmak and starring Maurice Chevalier, Pierre Renoir, Marie Déa and Erich von Stroheim. It was shot at the Joinville Studios in Paris. The film's sets were designed by the art directors Maurice Colasson and Georges Wakhévitch. Lured, an American re-make, directed by Douglas Sirk and starring Lucille Ball, was released in 1947.

== Plot ==
After one of her fellow taxi dancers is murdered by an unknown man whom she met through a personal column ad, Adrienne Charpentier is recruited by the police to answer a series of similar adverts to try to track down the killer. She meets and falls in love with the charming nightclub owner and womanizer Robert Fleury, but clues begin to appear that suggest that it is he who is the murderer.

== Partial cast ==
- Maurice Chevalier as Robert Fleury
- Marie Déa as Adrienne Charpentier, la journaliste/the newspaper woman
- Pierre Renoir as Brémontier
- Erich von Stroheim as Pears, l'ex-couturier/the former fashion designer
- André Brunot as Ténier, l'inspecteur en chef/the chief inspector
- Jacques Varennes as Maxime
- Henri Bry as Oglou Vacapoulos
- Catherine Farel as Lucie Baral
- Madeleine Geoffroy as Valérie
- Milly Mathis as Rose
- Jean Témerson as Batol, un inspecteur/an inspector
- Mady Berry as Sidonie, la cuisinière/the cook
- Pierre Magnier as l'homme d'affaires/the businessman
- André Numès Fils as le spectateur barbu/the bearded bystander
- Raymond Rognoni as un inspecteur de police/a police inspector
- Pierre Labry as Le danseur

== Bibliography ==
- Alpi, Deborah Lazaroff. Robert Siodmak: A Biography. McFarland, 1998.
