= Marie Déa =

French actress (1912–1992)

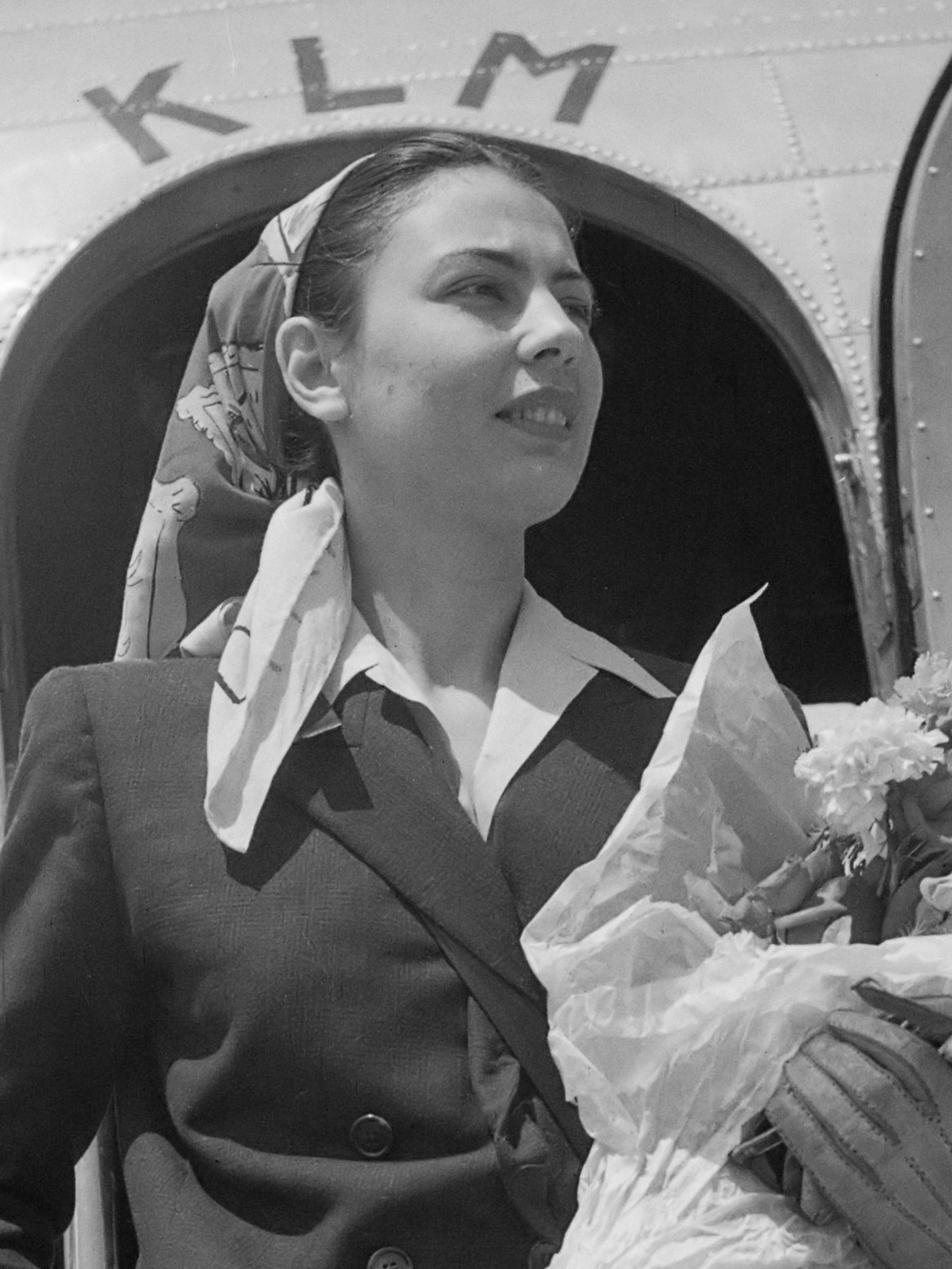
- Born: Odette Alice Marie Deupès; 17 May 1912; Nanterre, France
- Died: 1 March 1992 (aged 79); Paris, France
- Occupation: Actress
- Years active: 1939–1983

Marie Déa (born Odette Alice Marie Deupès; 17 May 1912 – 1 March 1992) was a French actress. She appeared in more than 50 films from 1939 to 1983. She was married to the actor Lucien Nat.

== Selected filmography ==
Film
Year	Title	Role	Notes
1939	Personal Column	Adrienne Charpentier	
1941	Foolish Husbands	Hélène Donaldo	
1941	First Ball	Nicole Noblet	
1942	The Newspaper Falls at Five O'Clock	Hélène Perrin	
1942	Les Visiteurs du Soir	Anne Hugues	
1943	Secrets	Marie-Thérèse	
1945	Secret Documents	Steffi	
1947	Monsieur Wens Holds the Trump Cards	Isabelle Dolo	
1949	56 Rue Pigalle	Inès de Montalban	
1950	Orpheus	Eurydice	
1951	Darling Caroline	Madame de Coigny	
1952	The Case Against X	Madame Le Mesles	
1957	OSS 117 Is Not Dead	Marion Lead	
1959	The Green Mare	Anaïs Maloret	
1963	Two Are Guilty	Madame Winter	
1976	The Good and the Bad	Madame Blanchot	
1977	Man in a Hurry	Madame de Bois-Rosé	
1978	Les petits câlins	The paper	
1983	Julien Fontanes, magistrat	Irma Dissiesky	TV series (1 episode)
