= Junie Astor =

French actress

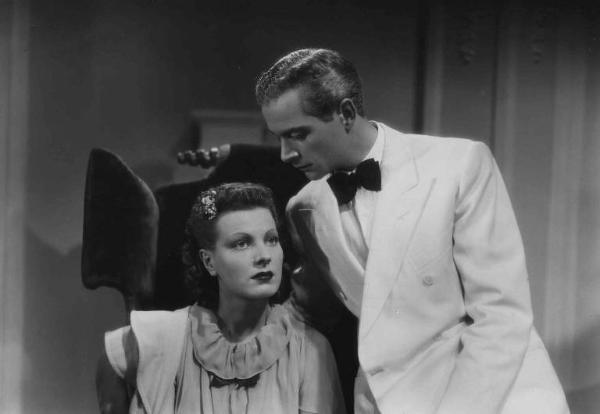
- Born: Rolande Jeanne Risterucci; 11 December 1911; Marseille, France
- Died: 22 August 1967 (aged 55); France
- Occupation: Actress

Rolande Jeanne Risterucci (1911–1967), better known as Junie Astor, was a French actress.

== Selected filmography ==
- Skylark (1934)
- Stradivarius (1935)
- The Lower Depths (1936)
- Women's Club (1936)
- In the Service of the Tsar (1936)
- Excursion Train (1936)
- 27 Rue de la Paix (1936)
- La Garçonne (1936)
- Culprit (1937)
- Monsieur Breloque Has Disappeared (1938)
- Adrienne Lecouvreur (1938)
- Entente cordiale (1939)
- Latin Quarter (1939)
- The Carnival of Venice (1939)
- Beating Heart (1940)
- White Patrol (1942)
- The Eternal Return (1943)
- The Eleventh Hour Guest (1945)
- Secret Cargo (1947)
- The Eleven O'Clock Woman (1948)
- Three Investigations (1948)
- Du Guesclin (1949)
- A Certain Mister (1950)
- Nightclub (1951)
- The Beautiful Image (1951)
- Guilty? (1951)
- Service Entrance (1954)
- Mademoiselle Strip-tease (1957)
- Isabelle Is Afraid of Men (1957)
- Interpol Against X (1960)
- Business (1960)
- The Man from Interpol (1966)

== Bibliography ==
- Crisp, C.G. The classic French cinema, 1930-1960. Indiana University Press, 1993
- Durgnat, Raymond. Jean Renoir. University of California Press, 1974.
