= Raymond Rouleau =

Belgian actor

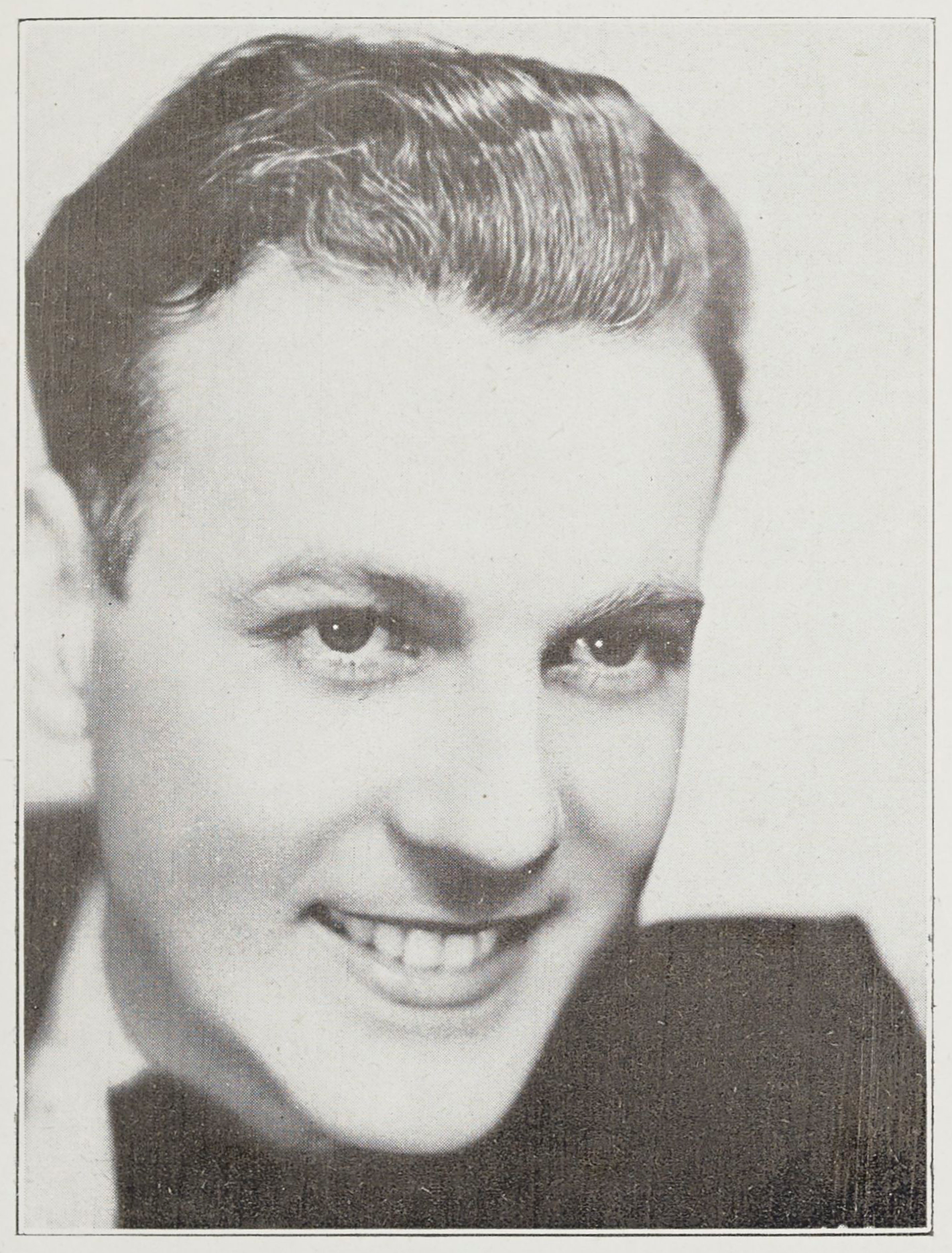
- Born: 4 June 1904; Brussels, Belgium
- Died: 11 December 1981 (aged 77); Paris, France
- Occupations: Actor, film director
- Years active: 1928–1981

Raymond Rouleau (French pronunciation: [ʁɛmɔ̃ ʁulo]; 4 June 1904 – 11 December 1981) was a Belgian actor and film director. He appeared in more than 40 films between 1928 and 1979. He also directed 22 films between 1932 and 1981. Rouleau studied at the Royal Conservatory of Brussels, where he met Tania Balachova. They immigrated to Paris together and collaborated with a variety of directors at the cutting edge of French theatre, including Charles Dullin and Gaston Baty. They married in France and separated in 1940. He subsequently married the actress Françoise Lugagne.

== Partial filmography ==
- L'Argent (1928) - Jantrou
- The Nude Woman (1932) - Pierre Bernier
- Suzanne (1932)
- Le jugement de minuit (1933) - L'inspecteur Berry
- Une vie perdue (1933)
- Volga in Flames (1934) - Schalin
- Vers l'abîme (1934) - Rist
- Beautiful Days (1935) - Boris - le deuxième amoureux de Sylvie
- Donogoo (1936) - Pierre
- Rose (1936)
- The Heart Disposes (1936) - Robert Levaltier
- The Messenger (1937, director)
- The Lafarge Case (1938) - Maître Lachaud
- The Shanghai Drama (1938) - Le journaliste André Franchon
- Conflict (1938) - Michel Lafont
- Coups de feu (1939) - Le lieutenant Stanislas de Glombinski
- Le duel (1941) - Henri Maurey
- First Ball (1941) - Jean de Lormel
- Who Killed Santa Claus? (1941) - Le baron Roland de la Faille
- Miss Bonaparte (1942) - Philippe de Vaudrey
- The Woman I Loved Most (1942) - Claude Ferval, l'auteur dramatique
- The Trump Card (1942) - Clarence
- The Honourable Catherine (1943) - Jacques Tavère
- Monsieur des Lourdines (1943) - Anthime des Lourdines
- The Secret of Madame Clapain (1943) - François Berthier
- L'aventure est au coin de la rue (1944) - Pierre Trévoux
- Secret Documents (1945) - Radlo
- Paris Frills (1945) - Philippe Clarence
- The Ideal Couple (1946) - Diavolo / Henri
- Dernier refuge (1947) - Philippe
- Vertigo (1947) - Dr. Jean Favier
- L'aventure commence demain (1948) - Claude Largeais
- Une grande fille toute simple (1948) - Simon
- L'inconnu d'un soir (1949) - Le roi Jean IV
- Mission in Tangier (1949) - Georges Masse
- Women Are Crazy (1950) - Claude Barrois
- Beware of Blondes (1950) - Georges Masse
- Tapage nocturne (1951) - Commissaire Legrand
- My Wife Is Formidable (1951) - L'homme giflé par Sylvia (uncredited)
- Massacre in Lace (1952) - Georges Masse
- Full House (1952) - L'inspecteur Wens (segment "Mort dans l'ascenseur, Le")
- It Is Midnight, Doctor Schweitzer (1952) - Le commandant Lieuvin
- Les Intrigantes (1954) - Paul Rémi
- Une fille épatante (1955) - Jacques Mareuil
- The Crucible (1957, director) - Governor Danforth (uncredited)
- Le fric (1959) - Williams
- The Lovers of Teruel (1962, director)
- The Big Scare (1964) - Chabriant, le maire
- Deux heures à tuer (1966) - De Rock
- Vogue la galère (1973, director)
