= Roger Capellani =

French film director and screenwriter

René Capellani
- Born: 31 January 1905; Paris, France
- Died: 30 May 1940 (aged 35); Zuydcoote, France
- Cause of death: Killed in action
- Occupation: Film director

Roger Capellani (31 January 1905 – 30 May 1940) was a French film director, the son of film director and screenwriter Albert Capellani and the nephew of the actor Paul Capellani.

He shot French versions of foreign films for the studios of the Paramount Pictures located at Joinville-le-Pont (Val-de-Marne), and worked several times for the screenwriter Saint-Granier.

He died at the battle of Dunkirk.

== Filmography ==
- 1931: When Do You Commit Suicide?
- 1931: Delphine (began by Jean de Marguenat)
- 1931: A Gentleman in Tails, Spanish version of The Man in Evening Clothes by René Guissart
- 1931: Les Déménageurs (short film)
- 1932: Avec l'assurance
- 1932: Côte d'Azur
- 1932: Le Domestique mécanique
- 1932: Mimi Pandore (short film)
- 1932: Le Beau Rôle (short film)
- 1932: Riri et Nono chez les pur-sang
- 1932: Le Bolide (short film)
- 1933: Noces et banquets
- 1933: Maison hantée
- 1933: Feu Toupinel
- 1934: Voilà Montmartre
- 1934: Torture
- 1934: Crime d'amour
- 1936: Le Mari rêvé
- 1940: The Emigrant
