= Let's Get Married (1931 film) =

1931 French comedy film

- Directed by: Louis Mercanton
- Written by: Gábor Drégely (play); Avery Hopwood (play); Henry Myers; Saint-Granier
- Starring: Alice Cocéa; Fernand Gravey; Marguerite Moreno
- Music by: Charles Borel-Clerc; Saint-Granier; Richard A. Whiting
- Production company: Les Films Paramount
- Distributed by: Les Films Paramount
- Release date: 6 March 1931
- Running time: 94 minutes
- Country: France
- Language: French

Let's Get Married (French: Marions-nous) is a 1931 French comedy film directed by Louis Mercanton and starring Alice Cocéa, Fernand Gravey and Marguerite Moreno. It was made at the Joinville Studios in Paris by the French subsidiary of Paramount Pictures as a remake of the company's 1930 film Her Wedding Night. Such multiple-language versions were common in the early years of sound film before dubbing became commonplace.

== Cast ==
- Alice Cocéa as Gisèle Landry
- Fernand Gravey as Francis Latour
- Marguerite Moreno as Madame Marchal
- Robert Burnier as Claude Mallet
- Pierre Etchepare as Adolphe
- Jacqueline Delubac as Simone
- Helena D'Algy as Lolita
- Véra Flory as Maroussia

== Reception ==
The film was judged "mediocre" and very similar to Chérie.

It is remembered for its songs.

== Bibliography ==
- Waldman, Harry & Slide, Anthony. Hollywood and the Foreign Touch: A Dictionary of Foreign Filmmakers and Their Films from America, 1910-1995. Scarecrow Press, 1996.
