= Delphine (1931 film) =

1931 film

- Directed by: Roger Capellani
- Produced by: Robert T. Kane
- Starring: Henri Garat; Alice Cocéa; Jacques Louvigny
- Music by: Paul Barnaby; Lionel Cazaux; J.A. Hornez; Saint-Granier
- Production company: Les Studios Paramount
- Distributed by: Les Films Paramount
- Release date: 20 November 1931
- Running time: 77 minutes
- Country: France
- Language: French

Delphine is a 1931 French romantic comedy film directed by Roger Capellani and starring Henri Garat, Alice Cocéa and Jacques Louvigny. It was shot at the Joinville Studios in Paris and produced and distributed by the French subsidiary of Paramount Pictures.

== Cast ==
- Henri Garat as André Bernard
- Alice Cocéa as Colette Bernard
- Jacques Louvigny as Gaston Chavannes
- Clara Tambour as Delphine Chavannes
- Alexandre Dréan as Papillon
- Antonio Brancato as Le ténor
- Jean Granier as Le réceptionnaire
- Henry Harment as Le directeur du theâtre
- André Brévannes as Le valet de chambre

== Bibliography ==
- Crisp, Colin. Genre, Myth and Convention in the French Cinema, 1929-1939. Indiana University Press, 2002.
