= Lionel Cazaux =

French composer (1906–1970)

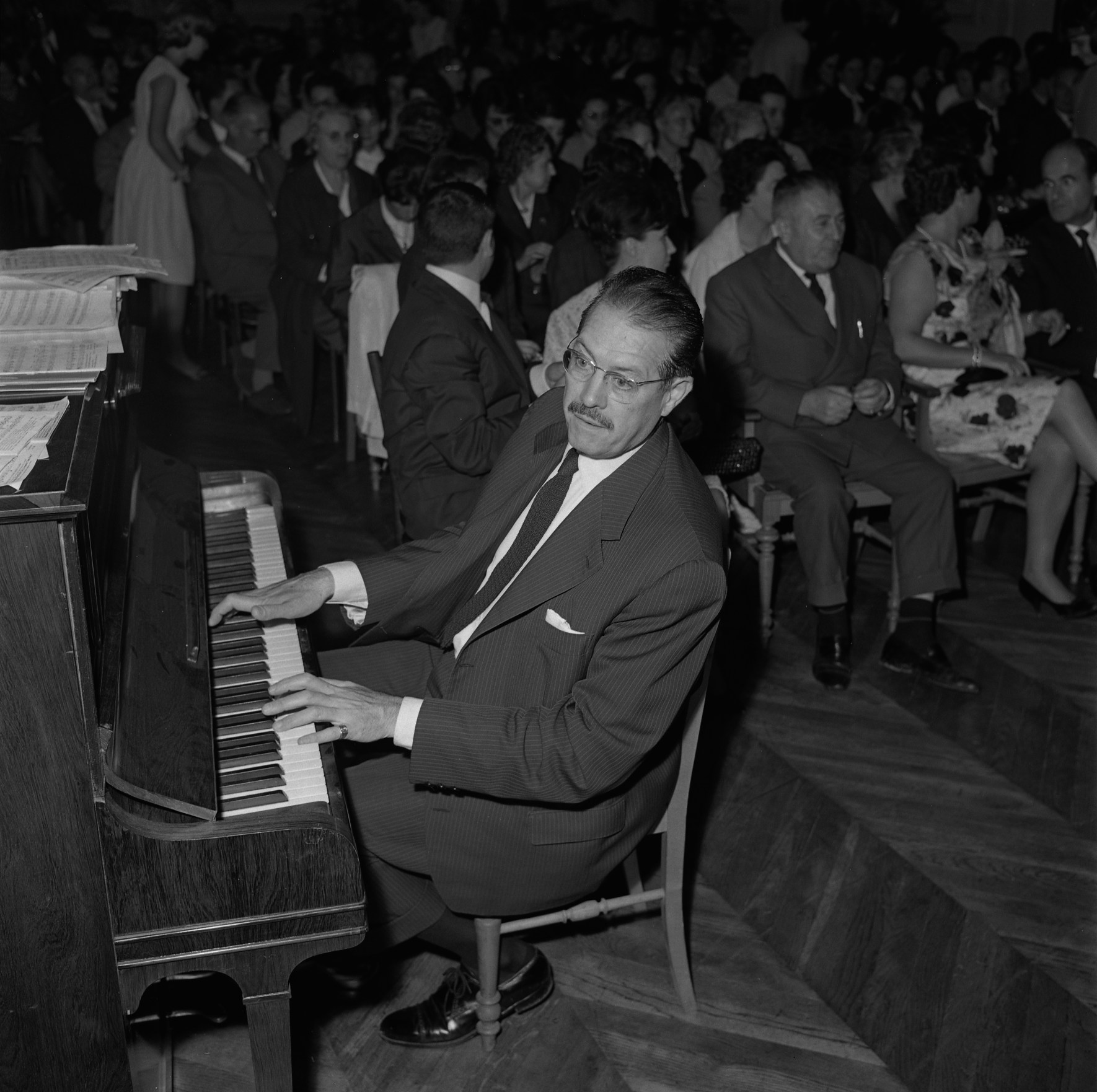
- Born: 7 December 1906; Le Havre, France
- Died: 24 September 1970 (aged 62); Toulouse, France
- Occupation: Composer
- Years active: 1931-1952 (film)

Lionel Cazaux (1906-1970) was a French composer of film scores. In the early 1930s he worked at Paramount Pictures's Joinville Studios in Paris.

== Selected filmography ==
- The Pure Truth (1931)
- The Man in Evening Clothes (1931)
- Delphine (1931)
- Holiday (1931)
- Alone (1931)
- Suzanne (1932)
- Miche (1932)
- A Star Disappears (1932)
- The Accomplice (1932)
- Durand Jewellers (1938)
- Happy Days (1941)

== Bibliography ==
- Claire Blakeway. Jacques Prévert: Popular French Theatre and Cinema. Fairleigh Dickinson Univ Press, 1990.
