= The Improvised Son =

1932 film

- Directed by: René Guissart
- Written by: Henri Falk
- Starring: Fernand Gravey; Florelle; Saturnin Fabre
- Cinematography: Theodore J. Pahle
- Edited by: Jean Delannoy
- Music by: René Sylviano
- Production company: Les Films Paramount
- Distributed by: Les Films Paramount
- Release date: 22 November 1932
- Running time: 84 minutes
- Country: France
- Language: French

The Improvised Son (French: Le fils improvisé) is a 1932 French comedy film directed by René Guissart and starring Fernand Gravey, Florelle and Saturnin Fabre. The film was produced and distributed by the French subsidiary of Paramount Pictures. It was shot at the Joinville Studios in Paris. It returned modest profits for Paramount, but did not stop the company largely ceasing its production operations at Joinville the following year.

== Synopsis ==
The mistress of a wealthy antiques collector tries to pass off her much younger lover to him as her long-lost son.

== Cast ==
- Fernand Gravey as Fernand Brassart
- Florelle as Maud
- Saturnin Fabre as M. Brassart
- Jackie Monnier as Fanny
- Edmond Roze as Le baron Brick
- Louis Baron fils as Léon Le Bélier
- Christiane Dor as Nöémie
- Jeanne Blanche
- Christian Gérard
- Lucien Brulé
- Claudie Gesvres

== Bibliography ==
- Crisp, Colin. Genre, Myth and Convention in the French Cinema, 1929-1939. Indiana University Press, 2002.
- Williams, Alan Larson. Republic of Images: A History of French Filmmaking. Harvard University Press, 1992.
