= The Premature Father =

1933 French comedy film by René Guissart

- Directed by: René Guissart
- Written by: Henri Falk
- Produced by: Henri Falk
- Starring: Fernand Gravey; Edith Méra; Saturnin Fabre
- Cinematography: Theodore J. Pahle
- Edited by: Jean Delannoy
- Music by: Jean Delettre; René Sylviano
- Production company: Les Studios Paramount
- Distributed by: Les Studios Paramount
- Release date: 29 September 1933
- Running time: 75 minutes
- Country: France
- Language: French

The Premature Father (French: Le père prématuré) is a 1933 French comedy film directed by René Guissart and starring Fernand Gravey, Edith Méra and Saturnin Fabre.

It was made at the Joinville Studios by the French subsidiary of Paramount Pictures.

== Cast ==
- Fernand Gravey as Édouard Puma & Fred
- Edith Méra as Dolorès
- Saturnin Fabre as Le père Puma
- Denise Dorian as Suzy
- Régine Barry as Valérie Marbois
- Blanche Denège as Madame Puma
- Léonce Corne
- Dany Lorys
- Lise Hestia

== Bibliography ==
- Dayna Oscherwitz & MaryEllen Higgins. The A to Z of French Cinema. Scarecrow Press, 2009.
