= Le Bled =

1929 film directed by Jean Renoir

- Directed by: Jean Renoir
- Written by: Henry Dupuis-Mazuel; André Jaeger-Schmidt
- Starring: Jackie Monnier; Enrique Riveros; Alexandre Arquillière
- Cinematography: Marcel Lucien; Léon Morizet; Joseph-Louis Mundwiller
- Edited by: Marguerite Renoir
- Production company: Société des Films Historiques
- Distributed by: Exclusivités Jean de Merly
- Release date: 17 May 1929
- Running time: 104 minutes
- Country: France
- Languages: Silent; French intertitles

Le Bled (1929)

Le Bled is a 1929 French silent adventure film directed by Jean Renoir and starring Jackie Monnier, Enrique Riveros and Alexandre Arquillière. It was shot at the Joinville Studios in Paris and on location in French Algeria around Biskra, Boufarik and Staouéli. The film's sets were designed by the art director William Aguet. It was made to commemorate the hundredth anniversary of the French conquest of Algeria in 1830. The film's title was an expression used to refer to the interior of Algeria.

== Cast ==
- Jackie Monnier as Claudie Duvernet
- Diana Hart as Diane Duvernet
- Renée Rozier as Marie-Jeanne
- Enrique Rivero as Pierre Hoffer
- Manuel Raaby as Manuel Duvernet
- Aïssa as Zoubir
- G.A. Martin as Le fauconnier
- Jacques Becker as Un ouvrier agricole
- Hadj Ben Yasmina as Le chauffeur
- Alexandre Arquillière as Christian Hoffer

== Bibliography ==
- Bergan, Ronald. Jean Renoir: Projections of Paradise. Skyhorse, 2016.
- Ferro, Marc. Colonization: A Global History. Routledge, 2005.
