= Simone Is Like That =

1933 film directed by Karl Anton

- Directed by: Karl Anton
- Written by: Alex Madis; Yves Mirande
- Starring: Meg Lemonnier; Henri Garat; Pierre Etchepare
- Cinematography: Otto Heller
- Music by: Raoul Moretti
- Production company: Les Studios Paramount
- Distributed by: Les Films Paramount
- Release date: 29 December 1933
- Running time: 89 minutes
- Country: France
- Language: French

Simone Is Like That (French: Simone est comme ça) is a 1933 French comedy film directed by Karl Anton and starring Meg Lemonnier, Henri Garat and Pierre Etchepare. It was produced by the French subsidiary of Paramount Pictures at the company's Joinville Studios in Paris. It was voted as one of the most popular releases of the year by readers of Pour Vous film magazine.

== Cast ==
- Meg Lemonnier as Simone
- Henri Garat as André
- Pierre Etchepare as Max
- Jean Périer as Baillon
- Davia as Lucette
- Milly Mathis as Ernestine
- Lucien Brulé
- Edith Méra
- Lucien Pardies
- Régine Barry
- André Lannes
- Claude May
- Karl Anton
- Alex Madis
- Paul Schiller

== Bibliography ==
- Bessy, Maurice & Chirat, Raymond. Histoire du cinéma français: 1929-1934. Pygmalion, 1988.
- Crisp, Colin. Genre, Myth and Convention in the French Cinema, 1929-1939. Indiana University Press, 2002.
- Rège, Philippe. Encyclopedia of French Film Directors, Volume 1. Scarecrow Press, 2009.
