= He Is Charming =

1932 film directed by Louis Mercanton

- Directed by: Louis Mercanton
- Written by: Albert Willemetz
- Starring: Meg Lemonnier; Henri Garat; Louis Baron fils
- Cinematography: Harry Stradling Sr.
- Edited by: Roger Mercaton
- Production company: Les Studios Paramount
- Distributed by: Les Films Paramount
- Release date: 25 February 1932
- Running time: 87 minutes
- Country: France
- Language: French
- Budget: $100,000

He Is Charming (French: Il est charmant) is a 1932 French musical comedy film directed by Louis Mercanton and starring Meg Lemonnier, Henri Garat and Louis Baron fils. It was one of a large number of operetta films made during the decade.

It was made at Joinville Studios by the French subsidiary of Paramount Pictures. A Swedish-language version Students in Paris was also released. The film's sets were designed by the art director René Renoux.

== Cast ==
- Meg Lemonnier as Jacqueline Cordier
- Henri Garat as Jacques Dombreval
- Louis Baron fils as M. Poitou
- Cassive as La présidente
- Marthe Derminy as Mme de la Tremblade
- Martine de Breteuil as Gaby
- Suzette O'Nil as La dactylo
- Dominique Bonnaud as Un Buste
- Jacques Ferny as Un Buste
- Vincent Hyspa as Un Buste
- Gaston Secrétan as Un Buste
- Paul Weil as Un Buste
- Rochelle Carley as La capitaine des girls
- Jean Mercanton as Le chasseur
- Bazin as Antoine
- Pierre Moreno as Ludovic de la Tremblade
- Jean Granier as Un boy
- Armand Dranem as Émile Barbarin
- Lucienne Claudy
- Christiane Delyne
- Andrée Dorns
- Madeleine Guitty
- Yvette Lebon
- Henri Niel]
- Erik Ode
- Nicole Ray as Petit rôle
- Viviane Romance
- Madeleine Rosetzky
- Louisette Rousseau
- Pierre Sergeol

== Bibliography ==
- Waldman, Harry. Missing Reels: Lost Films of American and European Cinema. McFarland, 2000.
