= My Hat =

1933 film

- Directed by: Lucien Jaquelux
- Written by: Henri Falk
- Starring: Noël-Noël; Jackie Monnier; Marcel Dalio
- Edited by: Jean Delannoy
- Production company: Les Films Paramount
- Distributed by: Les Films Paramount
- Release date: 9 June 1933
- Country: France
- Language: French

My Hat (French: Mon chapeau) is a 1933 French comedy film directed by Lucien Jaquelux and starring Noël-Noël, Jackie Monnier and Marcel Dalio. It was produced by the French subsidiary of Paramount Pictures at the Joinville Studios in Paris. The film's costumes were designed by René Hubert.

== Cast ==
- Noël-Noël as Grégoire
- Jackie Monnier as Lolita
- Marcel Dalio as Bokalas
- Jean Gobet as Le fiancé
- Henry Bonvallet as Monsieur Lopez
- Christian Argentin

== Bibliography ==
- Bessy, Maurice & Chirat, Raymond. Histoire du cinéma français: 1929-1934. Pygmalion, 1988.
- Crisp, Colin. Genre, Myth and Convention in the French Cinema, 1929-1939. Indiana University Press, 2002.
- Rège, Philippe. Encyclopedia of French Film Directors, Volume 1. Scarecrow Press, 2009.
