= Florelle =

French actress and singer (1898–1974)

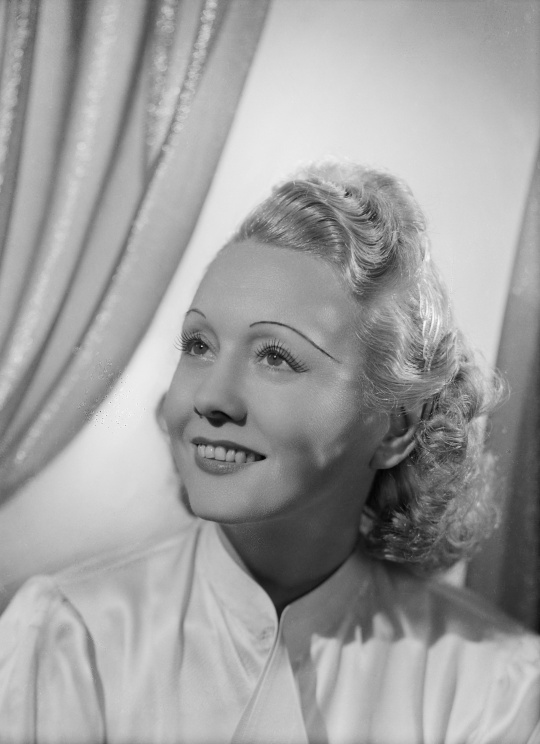
- Florelle in 1939
- Born: Odette Élisa Joséphine Marguerite Rousseau; 9 August 1898; Les Sables-d'Olonne, Vendée, France
- Died: 28 September 1974 (aged 76); La Roche-sur-Yon, Vendée, France
- Occupations: Actress; singer
- Years active: 1911–1956
- Spouse: Marcel Foucret (m. 1934; div. 1944)

Florelle (born Odette Élisa Joséphine Marguerite Rousseau, 9 August 1898 – 28 September 1974) was a French soprano singer and actress. She gained fame as Polly Peachum in the French film The Threepenny Opera, after which she had numerous other film roles. In the 1940s, she retired from the stage, but continued to make film appearances during the war.

== Early life ==
She was born as Odette Élisa Joséphine Marguerite Rousseau on 9 August 1898 in Les Sables-d'Olonne, Vendée. She came from a wealthy family living in the district of La Chaume, the oldest in the town of Sables-d'Olonne. Her father, an employee of the town hall, left his job to go into business and the family came to live in Paris; her mother worked at the café La Cigale.

== Career ==
Odette began her stage career at the age of 13, singing at the Théâtre de l'Ambigu-Comique and the Moulin Rouge. She was notably the partner of Raimu beginning in a sketch entitled "Le Marseillais et la Parigote". She worked in different establishments, then, in 1914, left for her first tour abroad with the troupe of "L'Européen". It was then that she adopted the pseudonym of Florelle, named after a singer in the troupe, Jean Flor. The tour was interrupted at the beginning of August in Vienna, Austria, by the outbreak of World War I.

After the war, she was noticed by Maurice Chevalier, with whom she participated in three films in the early 1920s. Florelle nevertheless remained attached to the music hall; in 1925, she was chosen as an understudy for Mistinguett and as such was the leader of the Moulin-Rouge revue "This is Paris" in a tour of South America. Back in Paris, she conducted a second version of "This is Paris" from 1927; in 1928–29, she again toured internationally in Europe; it was then that she was noticed by the Austrian filmmaker Georg Wilhelm Pabst.

During the 1930s, she devoted herself a lot to the cinema, where her activity was intense from 1930 to 1936; after L'Opéra de quat'sous, she toured again with Pabst (L'Atlantide), but also with Robert Siodmak (Tumultes), Raymond Bernard (Les Misérables), Fritz Lang (Liliom) and Jean Renoir (The Crime of Monsieur Lange). On stage, in 1934 she played the title role of the musical Marie Galante by Jacques Deval, in which she found the music of Kurt Weill, but was not met with success. She recorded several discs, whether related to the films she was filming or not.

Florelle's career subsequently declined; her only notable post-war film was Gervaise (1956) by René Clément.

== Death ==
She lived for a few years running a café in Sables-d'Olonne. She returned to Paris for a while, then returned to Les Sables, living until her death in La Roche-sur-Yon, Vendée, at age 76, in relative obscurity and, it seems, in poverty.

== Selected filmography ==
Year	Title	Role	Director(s)	Notes
1912	The Mask of Horror		Abel Gance	Credited as Mlle Rousseau
1930	The Prosecutor Hallers	Agnès	Robert Wiene	
1930	Love Songs		Robert Florey	Alternative-language version of the German film Rendezvous
1930	My Wife's Teacher		Robert Florey	Alternative-language version of the German film Rendezvous
1931	Venetian Nights		Pierre Billon; Robert Wiene	French-language version of the film The Love Express
1931	My Aunt from Honfleur	Albertine	André Gillois	
1931	The Threepenny Opera	Polly Peachum	G. W. Pabst	French-language version
1931	About an Inquest	Erna Kabisch	Henri Chomette; Robert Siodmak	French-language version of the film Inquest
1931	Montmartre	Irène	Raymond Bernard	
1932	The Nude Woman	Lolette	Jean-Paul Paulin	
1932	Passionately	Ketty Stevenson	René Guissart	
1932	The Improvised Son	Maud	René Guissart	
1932	The Wonderful Day	Gladys	Yves Mirande; Robert Wyler	Remake of the 1929 silent film of the same title
1932	Monsieur, Madame and Bibi	Anne Weber	Jean Boyer; Max Neufeld	French-language version of the German film A Bit of Love
1932	Tumultes	Ania	Robert Siodmak	French-language version of the German film Storms of Passion
1933	La dame de chez Maxim's	La Môme Crevette	Alexander Korda	French-language version of the film The Girl from Maxim's
1934	Les Misérables	Fantine	Raymond Bernard	
1934	The Last Night	Evelyne Ebert	Jacques de Casembroot	
1935	Lovers and Thieves	Irma Lurette	Raymond Bernard	
1935	Wedding Night	Sidonie de Valpurgis	Georges Monca	
1936	The Crime of Monsieur Lange	Valentine Cardès	Jean Renoir	
1937	The Dark Angels	Aline	Willy Rozier	
1952	Three Women		André Michel	
1956	Blood to the Head	Sidonie Vauquier	Gilles Grangier	
1956	Gervaise	Maman Coupeau	René Clément	Final film
