= Students in Paris =

1932 film directed by Louis Mercanton

- Directed by: Louis Mercanton
- Written by: Albert Willemetz
- Starring: Meg Lemonnier; Henri Garat
- Cinematography: Harry Stradling Sr.
- Production company: Paramount Pictures
- Distributed by: Paramount Pictures
- Release date: 13 April 1932
- Running time: 88 minutes
- Countries: Sweden; United States
- Language: Swedish

Students in Paris (Swedish: Studenter i Paris) is a 1932 American-Swedish operetta film directed by Louis Mercanton. It was made by Paramount Pictures at its Joinville Studios in Paris as the Swedish-language version of He Is Charming.

== Cast ==
- Henri Garat
- Steinar Jørandstad
- Meg Lemonnier
- Aino Taube

== Bibliography ==
- Waldman, Harry (2000). Missing Reels: Lost Films of American and European Cinema. McFarland.
