= A Star Disappears =

1932 film

- Directed by: Robert Villers
- Written by: Marcel Achard
- Starring: Suzy Vernon; Constant Rémy; Alexandre Dréan
- Music by: Lionel Cazaux
- Production company: Les Studios Paramount
- Distributed by: Les Films Paramount
- Release date: 22 August 1932
- Running time: 74 minutes
- Country: France
- Language: French

A Star Disappears (French: Une étoile disparaît) is a 1932 French comedy film directed by Robert Villers and starring Suzy Vernon, Constant Rémy and Alexandre Dréan. It was made at the Joinville Studios in Paris by the French branch of Paramount Pictures.

== Cast ==
- Suzy Vernon as Rosine
- Constant Rémy as Santerre
- Alexandre Dréan as Claudius
- Edith Méra as Liane Baxter
- Rolla Norman as Roland Mercier
- Marcel Vallée as Inspector Hulot
- René Worms as Ricot
- Sandra Ravel as Arlette
- Marie Glory as herself
- Meg Lemonnier as herself
- Madeleine Guitty as herself
- Louise Dauville as herself
- Lucien Brulé as himself
- Christian Argentin as himself
- Noël-Noël as himself
- Saint-Granier as himself
- Henri Garat as himself
- Fernand Gravey as himself
- Paul Pauley as himself
- Claude Marty as himself

== Bibliography ==
- Crisp, Colin. Genre, Myth and Convention in the French Cinema, 1929-1939. Indiana University Press, 2002.
