= When Do You Commit Suicide? (1931 film) =

1931 film

- Directed by: Roger Capellani
- Written by: André Dahl; Saint-Granier
- Starring: Robert Burnier; Noël-Noël; Simone Vaudry
- Cinematography: Fred Langenfeld
- Music by: Charles Borel-Clerc; Marcel Lattès
- Production company: Paramount Pictures
- Distributed by: Paramount Pictures
- Release date: November 20, 1931
- Country: United States
- Language: French

When Do You Commit Suicide? (French: Quand te tues-tu?) is a 1931 American pre-Code comedy film directed by Roger Capellani and starring Robert Burnier, Noël-Noël, and Simone Vaudry. It was made at Joinville Studios by the French subsidiary of Paramount Pictures. A separate Spanish-language version was made at Joinville the following year. In 1953 the film was remade again in French.

== Cast ==
- Robert Burnier as Le vicomte Xavier du Venoux
- Noël-Noël as Léon Mirol
- Simone Vaudry as Gaby
- Madeleine Guitty as La concierge
- Palau as M. Lemant
- Jeanne Fusier-Gir as Virginie
- Alexandre Dréan as Petavey
- Christian Argentin (unknown role)
- Georges Bever (unknown role)

== Bibliography ==
- Goble, Alan. The Complete Index to Literary Sources in Film. Walter de Gruyter, 1999.
