= Aces of the Turf =

1932 film

- Directed by: Serge de Poligny
- Written by: Marc-Hély; Saint-Granier
- Produced by: Robert Kane
- Cinematography: Jacques Montéran
- Music by: Charles Borel-Clerc
- Production company: Les Studios Paramount
- Distributed by: Les Films Paramount
- Release date: 24 March 1932
- Running time: 86 minutes
- Country: France
- Language: French

Aces of the Turf (French: Les as du turf) is a 1932 French comedy sports film directed by Serge de Poligny and starring Paul Pauley, Alexandre Dréan and Josyane. It was made at Joinville Studios by the French subsidiary of Paramount Pictures. In 1935, it was released in the United States with the alternative title of Racetrack Winners.

== Synopsis ==
Two struggling friends go through a series of jobs including waiters, cooks and racecourse tipsters. A lucky bet leads them to gain control of a top racehorse which a gang of crooks tries to steal from them.

== Cast ==
- Paul Pauley as Lafleur
- Alexandre Dréan as Papillon
- Josyane as Ginette
- Janett Flo as Lulu
- Marcel Barencey as Le patron
- Henri Jullien as Le bookmaker
- Madeleine Guitty as La cuisinière
- Jeanne Fusier-Gir as La directrice de l'atelier
- Georges Bever as Le commissaire-priseur
- Katia Lova
- Pierre Labry
- Raymond Aimos

== See also ==
- List of films about horses
- List of films about horse racing

== Bibliography ==
- Dayna Oscherwitz & MaryEllen Higgins. The A to Z of French Cinema. Scarecrow Press, 2009.
