= Nothing But Lies (1933 film) =

1933 film directed by Karl Anton

- Directed by: Karl Anton
- Written by: Saint-Granier; Paul Schiller
- Based on: Rien que des mensonges by Germaine Leprince and Claude Rolland
- Starring: Robert Burnier; Marguerite Moreno; Jackie Monnier
- Music by: René Sylviano
- Production company: Les Films Paramount
- Distributed by: Les Films Paramount
- Release date: 16 May 1933
- Running time: 84 minutes
- Country: France
- Language: French

Nothing But Lies (French: Rien que des mensonges) is a 1933 French comedy film directed by Karl Anton and starring Robert Burnier, Marguerite Moreno and Jackie Monnier. It was produced by the French subsidiary of Paramount Pictures at the Joinville Studios in Paris. The film's costumes were designed by René Hubert.

== Synopsis ==
In order to spend time with their mistresses, away from the suspicious eyes of their wives, two men pretend to be members of a secretive masonic lodge.

== Cast ==
- Robert Burnier as André Chevilly
- Marguerite Moreno as Mme. Leverdier
- Pierre Stéphen as Paul Daubreuil
- Jackie Monnier as Martha
- Raymonde Allain as Angèle
- Janine Guise as Claire
- Jeanne Fusier-Gir as Colombe
- Armand Lurville as M. Leverdier
- Jacques Maury as Léon Vilcourt
- Georges Cahuzac as Brunoy
- Camille Beuve as Saint-Archange

== Bibliography ==
- Bessy, Maurice & Chirat, Raymond. Histoire du cinéma français: 1929-1934. Pygmalion, 1988.
- Crisp, Colin. Genre, Myth and Convention in the French Cinema, 1929-1939. Indiana University Press, 2002.
