= Miche (film) =

1932 film

- Directed by: Jean de Marguenat
- Written by: Etienne Rey (play); Jean de Marguenat
- Starring: Suzy Vernon; Robert Burnier; Marguerite Moreno
- Music by: Charles Borel-Clerc; Lionel Cazaux
- Production company: Les Films Paramount
- Distributed by: Les Films Paramount
- Release date: 28 April 1932
- Running time: 75 minutes
- Country: France
- Language: French

Miche is a 1932 French drama film directed by Jean de Marguenat and starring Suzy Vernon, Robert Burnier and Marguerite Moreno. It was produced and distributed by the French subsidiary of Paramount Pictures. It was shot at the company's Joinville Studios in Paris.

The film is presumably lost.

== Cast ==
- Suzy Vernon as Micheline
- Robert Burnier as Jacques de Peyriére
- Marguerite Moreno as Madame Sorbiet
- Edith Méra as Countess Esera
- Magdeleine Bérubet as Madame Carpezaud
- Armand Dranem as Maître Raphael Demaze
- Pierre Moreno
- Sam Pierce as L'américain

== Bibliography ==
- Crisp, Colin. Genre, Myth and Convention in the French Cinema, 1929-1939. Indiana University Press, 2002.
