= Robert Kane (producer) =

American film producer

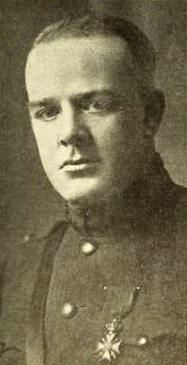
- Robert Kane pictured here wearing his American Expeditionary Forces (AEF) uniform and his Belgium Croix de guerre.
- Born: September 15, 1886; Jamestown, New York; United States
- Died: January 5, 1957 (aged 70); Honolulu, Hawaii; United States
- Other name: Robert T. Kane
- Occupation: Producer
- Years active: 1925–1948

Robert Kane (1886 – 1957) was an American film producer. He is sometimes credited as Robert T. Kane.

== Career ==
William Steiner and Robert T. Kane distributed the 1915 film Prohibition about the dangers of alcohol.

During the 1920s Kane oversaw the Astoria Studios for Paramount Pictures, the company's base on the East Coast. In 1930 Paramount put Kane in charge of the Joinville Studios in Paris where the company made multiple-language versions in various different languages. The move was a response to the introduction of sound film which meant English-language films made in Hollywood were no longer suitable for non-English-speaking markets. Joinville produced hundreds of films in a two-year period, before dubbing became more widespread.

In the late 1930s Kane was involved with 20th Century Fox's British subsidiary which made expensive productions rather than the quota quickies that had been made there by American companies earlier in the decade. In 1937 he produced Wings of the Morning, the first technicolor film to be made in the British Isles. He returned to the United States following the outbreak of the Second World War, where he worked on the bullfighting drama Blood and Sand starring Tyrone Power.

== Filmography ==
- The New Commandment (1925)
- Bluebeard's Seven Wives (1926)
- The Reckless Lady (1926)
- The Dancer of Paris (1926)
- The Great Deception (1926)
- The Prince of Tempters (1926)
- The Wilderness Woman (1926)
- Broadway Nights (1927)
- High Hat (1927)
- Convoy (1927)
- For the Love of Mike (1927)
- Dance Magic (1927)
- French Dressing (1927)
- The Whip Woman (1928)
- Mad Hour (1928)
- Harold Teen (1928)
- Lucky in Love (1929)
- Mother's Boy (1929)
- Syncopation (1929)
- Mistigri (1931)
- A Lucky Man (1930)
- Perché no? (1930)
- Marius (1931)
- Delphine (1931)
- Longing for the Sea (1931)
- Aces of the Turf (1932)
- Passionately (1932)
- A Weak Woman (1933)
- La pouponnière (1933)
- Caravan (1934)
- George White's Scandals (1934)
- Orchids to You (1935)
- Dressed to Thrill (1935)
- Under Pressure (1935)
- The Daring Young Man (1935)
- Spring Tonic (1935)
- Keep Smiling (1937)
- Under the Red Robe (1937)
- Wings of the Morning (1937)
- Dinner at the Ritz (1937)
- So This Is London (1939)
- Inspector Hornleigh (1939)
- Shipyard Sally (1939)
- Blood and Sand (1941)
- A Very Young Lady (1941)
- The Sullivans (1944)
- Canon City (1948)
- He Walked by Night (1948)

== Bibliography ==
- Jarvinen, Lisa. The Rise of Spanish-Language Filmmaking: Out from Hollywood's Shadow, 1929-1939. Rutger's University Press, 2012.
