= Victor and Victoria =

1933 film by Reinhold Schünzel

- Theatrical release poster
- German: Viktor und Viktoria
- Directed by: Reinhold Schünzel
- Written by: Reinhold Schünzel
- Produced by: Alfred Zeisler; Eduard Kubat
- Starring: Renate Müller; Hermann Thimig; Hilde Hildebrand; Friedel Pisetta; Fritz Odemar; Aribert Wäscher; Anton Walbrook
- Cinematography: Konstantin Irmen-Tschet
- Music by: Franz Doelle
- Distributed by: Universum Film AG
- Release date: 23 December 1933 (Germany)
- Running time: 100 minutes
- Country: Germany
- Language: German

Victor and Victoria (German: Viktor und Viktoria) is a 1933 German musical comedy film written and directed by Reinhold Schünzel, starring Renate Müller as a woman pretending to be a female impersonator. The following year, Schünzel directed a French-language version of the film titled George and Georgette, starring Meg Lemonnier and a French cast.

In 1935, Michael Balcon produced an English version titled First a Girl, directed by Victor Saville and starring Jessie Matthews and Sonnie Hale.

A West German remake by Karl Anton was released in 1957.

In 1982, Metro-Goldwyn-Mayer released Victor/Victoria, an English-language remake by Blake Edwards. Edwards later based a successful stage musical on the film. Both the film and the musical starred Julie Andrews.

== Plot ==
Susanne, an aspiring singer, steps in to replace Viktor, a mediocre actor, at a small cabaret in Berlin where he performs as a female impersonator. She catches the attention of an agent, who mistakenly believes that she is actually a man. As a result, Susanne rises to fame, but her situation becomes complicated when she finds herself falling in love with Robert.

== Cast ==
- Renate Müller as Susanne / Monsieur Victoria
- Hermann Thimig as Viktor Hempel
- Anton Walbrook as Robert
- Hilde Hildebrand as Ellinor
- Fritz Odemar as Douglas
- Friedel Pisetta as Lilian
- Aribert Wäscher as F. A. Punkertin, Victoria's agent

== Background ==
Max Hansen was originally considered for the role of Viktor, but Ufa managers had some reservations about his "background", (Note: Hansen was believed to have had a Jewish father, and in 1932, Hansen had satirized Adolf Hitler as a homosexual with his song "War'n Sie schon mal in mich verliebt?" ("Have you ever been in love with me?").) but were willing to ignore their suspicions provided "they were not shared by the Reich Ministry of Public Enlightenment and Propaganda." After an inquiry by the Ministry, Joseph Goebbels refused to give the part to Hansen, and the role went to Hermann Thimig instead.

German songwriter Bruno Balz, who was arrested several times by the Nazis for being gay, wrote the lyrics for the music, and also some of the dialogue that was sung in the film. After the film was released, Adolf Wohlbrück, who played the part of Robert, and was also gay, fled Nazi Germany for England, where he changed his name to Anton Walbrook.

== Critical analysis and reception ==
=== Analysis ===
American scholar Laurence Senelick opined that the film:

was the swan-song of a polymorphously perverse society on the verge of obliteration; for the last time the homosexual subculture of Weimar Berlin pervaded a mass-market movie; meant as light entertainment, the film nevertheless manages to undermine conventional notions of appropriate objects of desire; when men and women both cast lustful glances at Viktoria in her male drag, not quite sure of her essential gender, the film reminds us how arbitrary are the choices of our passions.

In a comparison between the music from the 1995 broadway musical, and the music in this film, American scholar Richard Traubner wrote Schünzel's "hilarious comedy has a completely different, more integrated score by Franz Doelle, and offers nary a whiff of overt gayness; the songs in the film are not meant to be important but add to the frivolity, while in the musical, they do mean to be very important but wind up for the most part utterly useless or incidental, through sheer mediocrity or inappropriateness."

=== Reception ===
The film was well-received in the German-American community of New York. American film critic Mordaunt Hall wrote that "admirers of well-mounted musical comedy carrying the proper amount of romance, embodying several tuneful songs and presented by an excellent cast are likely to fall in love with this German language film; using first class actors, the director has made the old theme of the life of a female impersonator the foundation for a delightful combination of humor and music."

Film critic Malcolm Johnson wrote the film "generates appeal with its operetta like feeling, and its exhilarating technique of dialogue that turns quite suddenly and naturally into song and its richly atmospheric German and English milieus." He went on to say "the production values are not opulent, but they give a fine sense of the gloss and spirit of the German musical film in the post-Weimar era, and Schünzel proves a stylish director with a light, almost Lubitsch touch."

Wanda Hale of the New York Daily News observed that "between the first reel and the last the scenarists try a bundle of tricks to keep the romance running on two wheels and the interest on four; the result is not altogether a smooth ride for the audience." She further stated that Mueller has a "native flair for comedy", and Wohlbrück is "properly handsome and at ease."

== See also ==
- List of films made in Weimar Germany
- List of LGBTQ-related films of the 1930s
- George and Georgette
- First a Girl
- My Girlfriend, the Transvestite
