= Passionately (film) =

1932 French film

- Directed by: René Guissart; Louis Mercanton
- Written by: Jean Boyer; Albert Willemetz
- Based on: Passionately by Maurice Hennequin
- Produced by: Robert T. Kane
- Starring: Florelle; Fernand Gravey; René Koval
- Cinematography: Harry Stradling Sr.
- Music by: André Messager
- Production company: Les Studios Paramount
- Distributed by: Les Studios Paramount
- Release date: 20 September 1932
- Running time: 80 minutes
- Country: France
- Language: French

Passionately (French: Passionnément) is a 1932 French musical comedy film directed by René Guissart and Louis Mercanton and starring Florelle, Fernand Gravey and René Koval. It was produced by the French subsidiary of Paramount Pictures and shot at the Joinville Studios in Paris. It is an operetta film, based on the 1926 stage work of the same title composed by André Messager.

== Synopsis ==
The young and beautiful American Ketty Stevenson arrives in France with her husband who is there to complete a business deal. Intensely jealous and wary of the reputation of Frenchmen, he insists his wife disguise herself as an older and less attractive woman. When she encounters Robert, who her husband hopes to trick into selling some land in Colorado he has inherited with oil on it, she pretends to be her own niece. The two fall in love, while her husband has discovered the joys of French champagne and himself fallen for Ketty's maid Julia.

== Cast ==
- Florelle as Ketty Stevenson
- Fernand Gravey as Robert Perceval
- René Koval as Monsieur Stevenson
- Danièle Brégis as Hélène Le Barrois
- Louis Baron fils as Monsieur Le Barrois
- Davia as Julia
- André Urban as Le commandant
- Julien Carette as Auguste

== Bibliography ==
- Bessy, Maurice & Chirat, Raymond. Histoire du cinéma français: 1929-1934. Pygmalion, 1988.
- Crisp, Colin. Genre, Myth and Convention in the French Cinema, 1929-1939. Indiana University Press, 2002.
- Goble, Alan. The Complete Index to Literary Sources in Film. Walter de Gruyter, 1999.
- Rège, Philippe. Encyclopedia of French Film Directors, Volume 1. Scarecrow Press, 2009.
