= Marcel Magniez =

French art director

- Born: 1888; Rouen, Normandy, France
- Died: Unknown
- Occupation: Art Director
- Years active: 1927-1953 (film)

Marcel Magniez (born 1888) was a French art director who designed sets for around forty film productions from the late 1920s to the early 1950s.

== Selected filmography ==
- Parisian Pleasures (1927)
- A Dog That Pays Off (1932)
- Sidonie Panache (1934)
- Adémaï in the Middle Ages (1935)
- My Aunts and I (1937)
- The Chess Player (1938)
- Three from St Cyr (1939)
- Monsieur Hector (1940)
- Radio Surprises (1940)
- Bach en correctionnelle (1940)
- The Black Diamond (1941)
- Fantastic Night (1942)
- Fever (1942)
- Return to Happiness (1942)
- The Wolf of the Malveneurs (1943)
- The Misfortunes of Sophie (1946)
- The Faceless Enemy (1946)
- The Scarlet Bazaar (1947)
- The Wolf (1949)
- Shot at Dawn (1950)
- Cartouche, King of Paris (1950)
- The Fighting Drummer (1952)
- The Drunkard (1953)

== Bibliography ==
- Crisp, Colin. French Cinema—A Critical Filmography: Volume 2, 1940–1958. Indiana University Press, 2015.
- Soister, John T. Conrad Veidt on Screen: A Comprehensive Illustrated Filmography. McFarland, 2002.
