= Chaste Susanne (1937 film) =

1937 film

- Directed by: André Berthomieu
- Written by: Frederick Gotfurt; Jean Boyer; Austin Melford; Val Valentine
- Based on: Chaste Susanne by Antony Mars; Maurice Desvallières
- Produced by: Curtis Bernhardt; Eugène Tucherer
- Starring: Raimu; Meg Lemonnier; Henri Garat
- Cinematography: Roy Clark
- Edited by: Marcel Cohen
- Music by: Jean Gilbert
- Production companies: B.U.P. Française; British Unity Pictures
- Release date: 27 May 1937
- Running time: 90 minutes
- Countries: France; United Kingdom
- Language: French

Chaste Susanne (French: La chaste Suzanne) is a 1937 French-British comedy film directed by André Berthomieu and starring Raimu, Meg Lemonnier and Henri Garat. It is an adaptation of the 1912 operetta Chaste Susanne by Jean Gilbert, itself based on an earlier play by Antony Mars and Maurice Desvallières. It was made when the 1930s booms in operetta films was at its height.

Made at Ealing Studios in London, it was the French-language version of the British film The Girl in the Taxi. Henri Garat was the only actor to appear in both productions. The film's sets were designed by the art director Jean d'Eaubonne.

== Synopsis ==
In Paris an academy dedicated to promoting virtue awards its annual prize, but accidentally gives it to the wrong woman named Suzanne. The recipient is in fact a dancer who performs at the Moulin Rouge and is conducting an affair with the potential son-in-law of Monsieur des Aubrays, the head of the academy.

== Cast ==
- Raimu as Monsieur des Aubrays
- Meg Lemonnier as Suzanne Pomarel
- Henri Garat as René Boislurette
- Blanchette Brunoy as Jacqueline
- Serge Flateau as Hubert
- Jean Témerson as Alexis
- Blanche Denège as Madame des Aubrays
- Anthony Gildès as Dominique
- Charles Dechamps as Pomarel

== Bibliography ==
- Oscherwitz, Dayna & Higgins, MaryEllen . The A to Z of French Cinema. Scarecrow Press, 2009.
