= The Nude Dancer =

French language 1952 film

- Directed by: Pierre-Louis
- Written by: André-Paul Antoine; Pierre-Louis
- Based on: The Nude Dancer by Colette Andris
- Produced by: Robert de Nesle
- Starring: Catherine Erard; Pierre Larquey; Jean Debucourt
- Cinematography: Charles Bauer
- Edited by: Jeannette Berton
- Music by: Jerry Mengo; Pierre Spiers
- Production company: Comptoir Français du Film Production
- Distributed by: Comptoir Français du Film Production
- Release date: 8 October 1952
- Running time: 105 minutes
- Country: France
- Language: French

The Nude Dancer (French: La danseuse nue) is a 1952 French comedy film directed by Pierre-Louis and starring Catherine Erard, Pierre Larquey and Jean Debucourt. The film's sets were designed by the art director Claude Bouxin. It is based on the interwar career of music hall star Colette Andris.

== Synopsis ==
A student gives up her studies and becomes a cabaret dancer leading to her fiancee breaking off their engagement. She marries an older man who helps her career by buying a nightclub.

== Cast ==
- Catherine Erard as Colette Andris
- Pierre Larquey as Charmois
- Jean Debucourt as Gilbert Chantal
- Raymond Bussières as Saulnier
- Luce Aubertin as Tania
- Gaby Basset as Justine
- Alexandre Dréan as Gallus
- Édith Georges as Peggy
- Elisa Lamotte as Thérèse
- Nicole Lemaire as La speakerine
- Michel Nastorg as Michel
- Philippe Olive as Pépère
- Pierre-Louis as René Laporte
- Robert Pizani as Grégor

== Bibliography ==
- Bessy, Maurice & Chirat, Raymond. Histoire du cinéma français: 1951-1955. Pygmalion, 1989.
