= Alice Cocéa =

French actress and singer

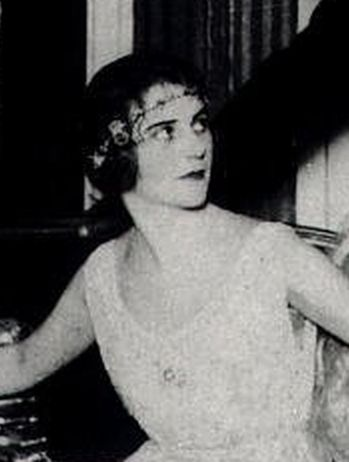
Alice Cocéa, 1921

Alice Sophie Cocéa or Cocea (28 July 1899 – 2 July 1970) was a Romanian-born French actress and singer.

== Early life ==
Alice Cocéa was born in Sinaia, Prahova County on 28 July 1899. She was a daughter of Romanian Land Forces General Dimitrie Cocea. Among her siblings were sister, Florica (who married Bressy), and a brother, Nicolae D. Cocea, a socialist journalist and novelist who was the father of actresses Dina and Tantzi Cocea.

== Career ==
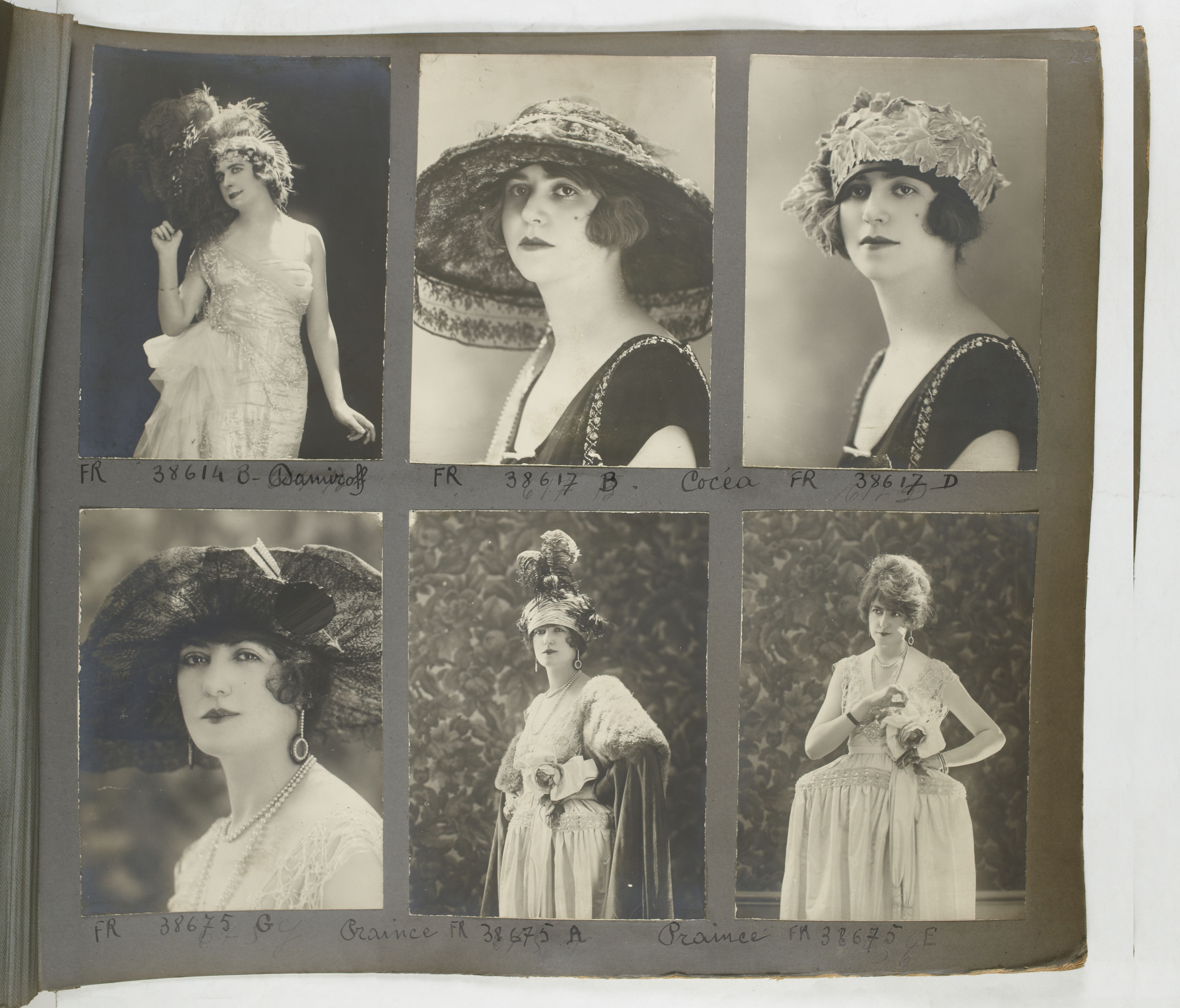
Photographs, including of Cocéa, by Jean Reutlinger

Although born in Romania, Cocéa came to France as a young teen before making her professional debut on the stage. She worked before, during, and after her marriage to Count Stanislas but announced her retirement shortly after her fiancé's death in 1932, stating that she would join a convent. She worked as the manager of the Théâtre des Ambassadeurs, before returning to the screen in the 1960s.

During World War II, Cocéa was arrested as a Nazi collaborator, and later released. Her memoirs, Mes amours que j'ai tant aimées ("The Loves I So Loved"), were published in 1958.

== Personal life ==
She was married in 1926 to Count Stanislas Édouard François Marie de La Rochefoucauld (1903–1965), only son and heir apparent of Édouard de La Rochefoucauld, Duke of Bisaccia. His father opposed the marriage, going so far as to seeking a court order preventing them from marrying, but the French Court ruled in the young couples favor. They marriage ended in divorce in 1931, and Count Stanislas later married Princess Jeanne of San Felice de Viggiano (a granddaughter of Prince Paul de Bauffremont and Countess Valentine de Riquet de Caraman-Chimay), in 1947.

In 1932 her fiancé, Lt. Victor Point, a French explorer and nephew of Philippe Berthelot, killed himself in Agay (a village in Saint-Raphaël in the French Riviera) when Cocéa declined to marry him; he died after shooting himself in the mouth. They had been involved for three years, and she had promised to become his wife once her divorce from Rochefoucauld had been settled.

She was reportedly the mistress of Roger Capgras, who rose from being a vegetable dealer to head of a major newspaper during the Nazi Occupation and later a fascist-leaning theatrical figure.

She died in Boulogne-Billancourt on 2 July 1970.

== Filmography ==
- My Childish Father (1930)
- Let's Get Married (1931)
- Delphine (1931)
- Atout coeur (1931)
- Nicole and Her Virtue (1932)
- Greluchon délicat (1934)
- Le joueur (1962)
- Striptease (1963)
- La ronde (1964)
