= Robert Burnier =

French actor (1897–1974)

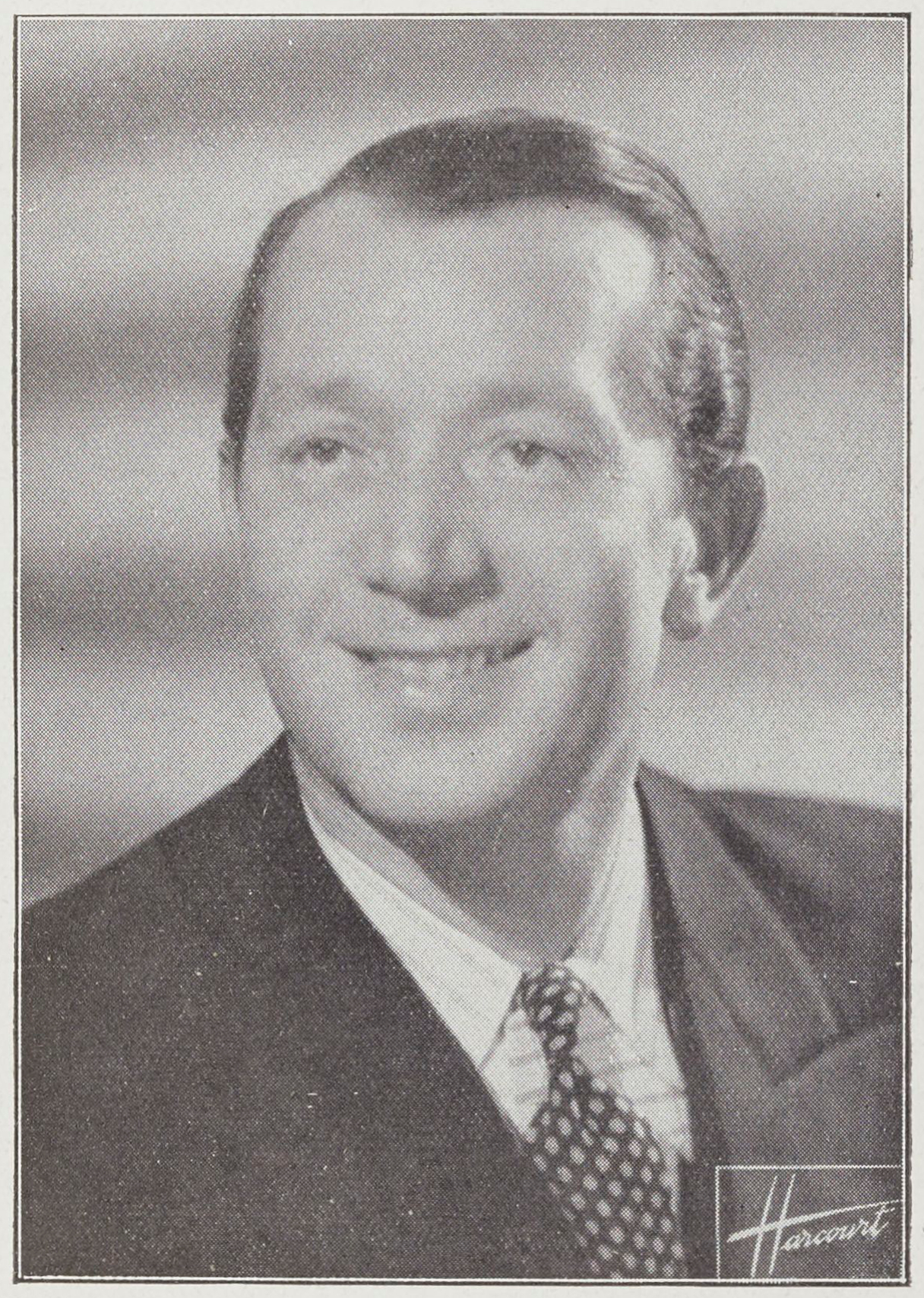
- Born: 19 May 1897; Paris, France
- Died: 24 April 1974 (aged 76); Paris, France
- Occupation: Actor
- Years active: 1931–1972 (film & TV)

Robert Burnier (1897–1974) was a French film actor.

== Selected filmography ==
- When Do You Commit Suicide? (1931)
- Let's Get Married (1931)
- Miche (1932)
- Côte d'Azur (1932)
- Make-Up (1932)
- Nothing But Lies (1933)
- The Porter from Maxim's (1933)
- Ciboulette (1933)
- Coralie and Company (1934)
- Radio Surprises (1940)
- Dakota 308 (1951)
- Love, Madame (1952)
- The Women Couldn't Care Less (1954)
- The Count of Bragelonne (1954)
- Rasputin (1954)
- Leguignon the Healer (1954)
- Your Turn, Callaghan (1955)
- More Whiskey for Callaghan (1955)
- Madonna of the Sleeping Cars (1955)
- The Bureaucrats (1959)
- La Belle Américaine (1961)
- All the Gold in the World (1961)
- Arsène Lupin Versus Arsène Lupin (1962)
- Landru (1963)
- Ophelia (1963)
- The Counterfeit Constable (1964)
- Marie-Chantal contre le docteur Kha (1965)
- Amour (1970)

== Bibliography ==
- Goble, Alan. The Complete Index to Literary Sources in Film. Walter de Gruyter, 1999.
