= The Midnight Prince =

- Directed by: René Guissart
- Written by: Paul Pauley; Jacques de Bénac
- Produced by: Charles Simond
- Starring: Henri Garat; Edith Méra; Monique Rolland
- Cinematography: René Colas
- Edited by: André Versein
- Music by: Pascal Bastia; Germaine Raynal; Maurice Yvain
- Production company: Vedettes Françaises Associees
- Release date: 2 November 1934
- Running time: 100 minutes
- Country: France
- Language: French

The Midnight Prince (French: Prince de minuit) is a 1934 French musical comedy film directed by René Guissart and starring Henri Garat, Edith Méra and Monique Rolland.

The film's sets were designed by the art director Jacques Colombier.

== Synopsis ==
A Paris music shop assistant is employed at night by a nightclub to pretend to be a famous foreign prince in order to drum up business. Things become complicated when he is confused with a real foreign royal.

== Cast ==
- Henri Garat as Henry Leroy
- Edith Méra as Ruth Doxy
- Monique Rolland as Denise
- Palau as Monsieur Achille
- Pierre Juvenet as Rupert
- Jacques Lerner as Le général Sabourovitch
- Paul Pauley as Galoubet
- Robert Pizani as Le comte Maritza
- Claude Benedict
- Georges Bever
- Robert Bossis
- Renée Cloden
- Jacques Derives
- Catherine Fonteney
- Jeanne Fusier-Gir
- Anthony Gildès
- Jean Gobet
- Poncet
- Betty Rowe
- Marthe Sarbel
- Marcel Vidal

== Bibliography ==
- Dayna Oscherwitz & MaryEllen Higgins. The A to Z of French Cinema. Scarecrow Press, 2009.
