= Pierre Dac =

French humorist (1893–1975)

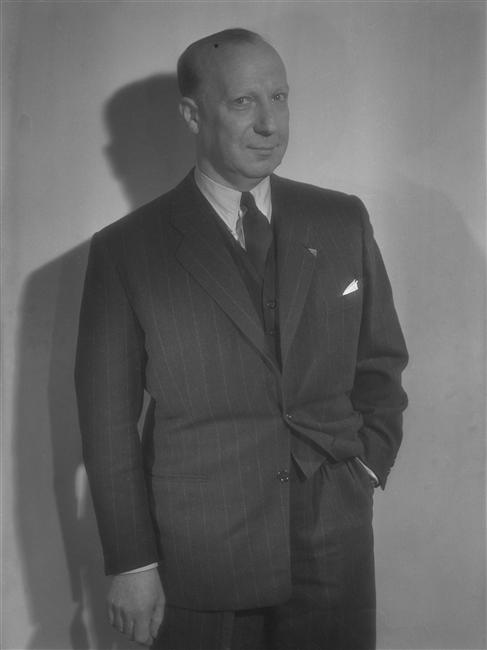
Dac in 1947

André Isaac (15 August 1893 Châlons-sur-Marne, France – 9 February 1975 Paris, France), better known as Pierre Dac, was a French humorist. During World War II, Dac was one of the speakers of the BBC's Radio Londres service to occupied France. He produced a series of satirical songs which were broadcast on the station. After the war, he participated in a comic duet with the humorist Francis Blanche.

A very active freemason, initiated in 1926 at "Les Inséparables d'Osiris" lodge in Paris, he created a parodic and slang masonic rite "Le rite des Voyous" still practiced in some French lodges.

Dac is also the creator of the comic term "Schmilblick."

== Honours and awards ==
- Knight of the Order of Legion of Honour
- Croix de Guerre 1914-1918
- Croix de Guerre 1939-1945
- Resistance Medal

== Selected filmography ==
- Voilà Montmartre (1934)
- Juanita (1935)
- Radio Surprises (1940)
- Good Enough to Eat (1951)
- La Famille Anodin (1956) (TV)
- La Belle Américaine (1961)
- Ne jouez pas avec les Martiens (1968)
- Le Petit Baigneur (1968)
