= Chérie (film) =

1930 film directed by Louis Mercanton

- Directed by: Louis Mercanton
- Written by: Saint-Granier
- Based on: Come Out of the Kitchen! by Alice Duer Miller
- Starring: Saint-Granier; Marguerite Moreno; Mona Goya
- Cinematography: René Guissart
- Music by: Saint-Granier; Sam Coslow
- Production company: Paramount Pictures
- Distributed by: Paramount Pictures
- Release date: 24 December 1930
- Running time: 80 minutes
- Countries: France; United States
- Language: French

Chérie is a 1930 American-French musical comedy film directed by Louis Mercanton and starring Saint-Granier, Marguerite Moreno and Mona Goya. It was produced by the French subsidiary of Paramount Pictures at the Joinville Studios in Paris. It is the French-language version of the Hollywood film Honey. A multiple-language version, common during the early years of sound film, it was remade in several other languages at Joinville, all based on the 1916 novel Come Out of the Kitchen! by Alice Duer Miller.

== Synopsis ==
A brother and sister have no money and decide to rent out their property to a wealthy widow, with themselves anonymously acting as servants. The woman's daughter soon falls in love with the valet while her fiancé is entranced by the maid.

== Cast ==
- Saint-Granier as Charles Dangerfield
- Marguerite Moreno as Mrs. Falkner
- Mona Goya as Olivia Dangerfield
- Janine Guise as Cora Falkner
- Sunshine Woodward as Doris
- Jeanne Fusier-Gir as Mayme
- Georges Bever as Weeks
- Marc-Hély as Mr. Burnstein
- Fernand Gravey as Burton
- Jacqueline Delubac as Cora Falkner

== Bibliography ==
- Goble, Alan. The Complete Index to Literary Sources in Film. Walter de Gruyter, 1999.
- Oscherwitz, Dayna & Higgins, MaryEllen. The A to Z of French Cinema. Scarecrow Press, 2009.
- Rège, Philippe. Encyclopedia of French Film Directors, Volume 1. Scarecrow Press, 2009.
