= George and Georgette =

1933 film

- Directed by: Roger Le Bon; Reinhold Schünzel
- Written by: Henri Falk; Reinhold Schünzel
- Produced by: Alfred Zeisler
- Starring: Julien Carette; Meg Lemonnier; Anton Walbrook
- Cinematography: Konstantin Irmen-Tschet
- Music by: Franz Doelle
- Production company: UFA
- Distributed by: L'Alliance Cinématographique Européenne
- Release date: 2 February 1934
- Running time: 93 minutes
- Country: Germany
- Language: French

George and Georgette (French: Georges et Georgette) is a 1934 German comedy film directed by Roger Le Bon and Reinhold Schünzel and starring Julien Carette, Meg Lemonnier and Anton Walbrook. It is the French-language version of the film Victor and Victoria.

== Synopsis ==
A woman pretends to be a male female impersonator and enjoys great success on the stage, but has trouble concealing her secret when she falls in love.

== Cast ==
- Julien Carette as Georges
- Meg Lemonnier as Suzanne
- Anton Walbrook as Robert
- Jenny Burnay as Elinore
- Paulette Dubost as Lilian
- Félix Oudart as Pokerdass
- Charles Redgie as Douglas

== Bibliography ==
- Prawer, Siegbert (2007). Between Two Worlds: The Jewish Presence in German and Austrian Film, 1910-1933. Berghahn Books. ISBN 978-1845453039.
