= Saint-Granier =

French actor and singer

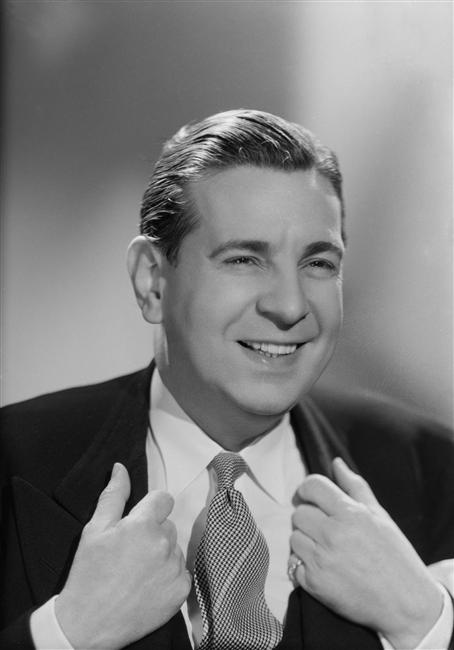
- Born: 27 May 1890; Paris, France
- Died: 25 June 1976 (aged 86); Neuilly-sur-Seine, Hauts-de-Seine, France
- Other name: Jean Adolphe Alfred de Granier de Cassagnac
- Occupation: Actor
- Years active: 1921–1956 (film)

Saint-Granier (1890–1976) was a French actor, singer, songwriter and screenwriter. During the early 1930s he worked for the French subsidiary of Paramount Pictures at the Joinville Studios in Paris.

== Selected filmography ==
- Chérie (1930)
- A Gentleman in Tails (1931)
- Delphine (1931)
- When Do You Commit Suicide? (1931)
- The Man in Evening Clothes (1931)
- Let's Get Married (1931)
- Aces of the Turf (1932)
- Make-Up (1932)
- A Star Disappears (1932)
- Nothing But Lies (1933)
- Tartarin of Tarascon (1934)
- You Can't Fool Antoinette (1936)
- Destiny (1946)
- Nightclub (1951)
- Sins of Paris (1953)
- Naked in the Wind (1953)
- Babes a GoGo (1956)

== Bibliography ==
- Biltereyst, Daniel & Van de Vijver, Lies (ed.) Mapping Movie Magazines: Digitization, Periodicals and Cinema History. Springer Nature, 2020.
- Wild, Jennifer. The Parisian Avant-Garde in the Age of Cinema, 1900–1923. University of California Press, 2023.
