= Madeleine Guitty =

French actress

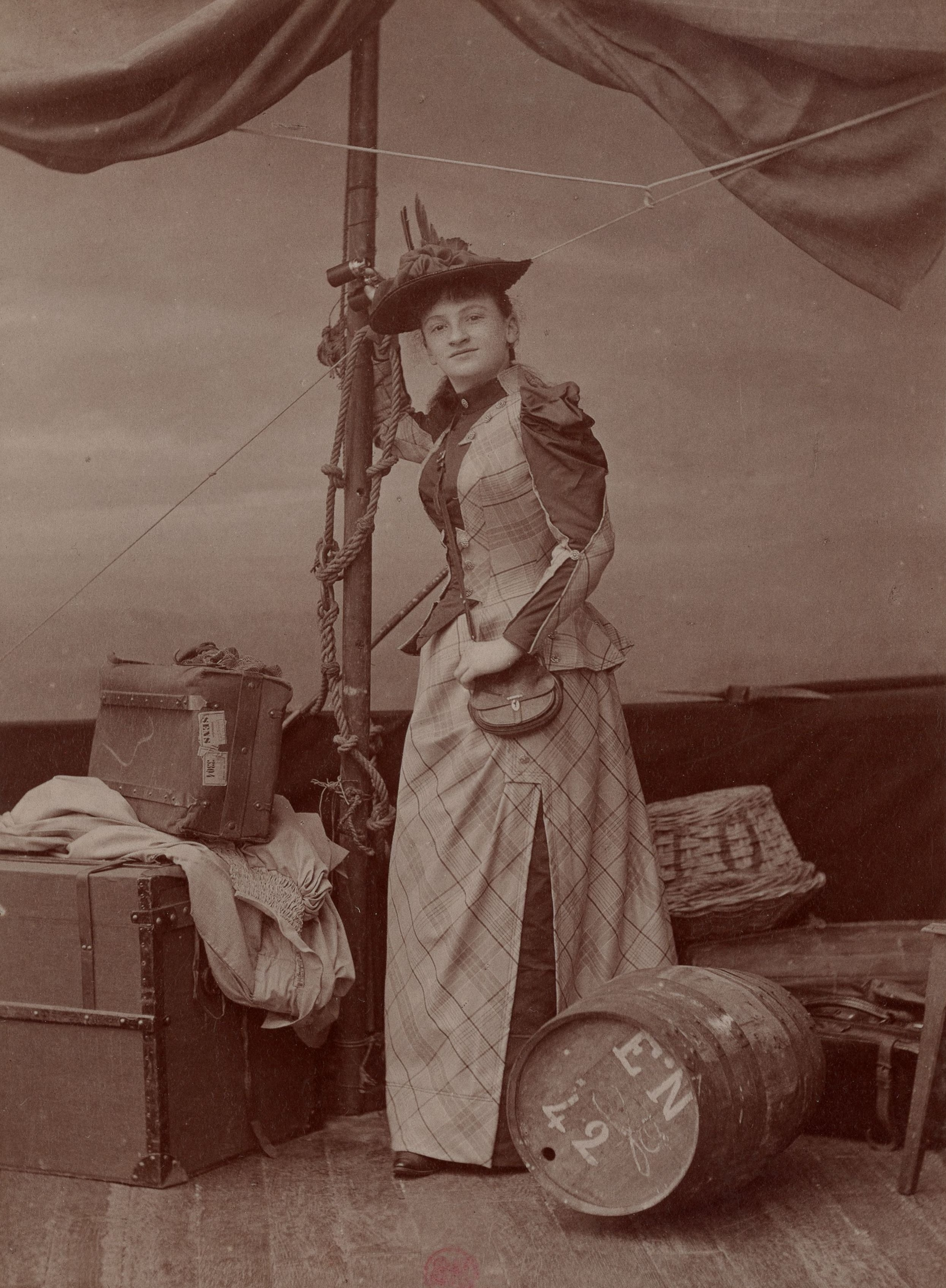
- Born: Marguerite Madeleine Guichard; 5 June 1870; Corbeil (now Corbeil-Essonnes), France
- Died: 12 April 1936 (aged 65); Paris, France
- Occupation: Actress
- Years active: 1910–1936 (film)

Madeleine Guitty (5 June 1870 – 12 April 1936) was a French stage and film actress.

== Selected filmography ==
- The Mysteries of Paris (1922)
- Madame Sans-Gêne (1925)
- Montmartre (1925)
- Paris in Five Days (1926)
- 600,000 Francs a Month (1926)
- Croquette (1927)
- Muche (1927)
- Two Timid Souls (1928)
- Our Masters, the Servants (1930)
- Luck (1931)
- When Do You Commit Suicide? (1931)
- Lilac (1932)
- Aces of the Turf (1932)
- He Is Charming (1932)
- The Champion Cook (1932)
- A Star Disappears (1932)
- A Dog That Pays Off (1932)
- The Picador (1932)
- In Old Alsace (1933)
- The Faceless Voice (1933)
- The Old Devil (1933)
- The Bread Peddler (1934)
- Zouzou (1934)
- If I Were Boss (1934)
- Skylark (1934)
- Sidonie Panache (1934)
- Little Jacques (1934)
- Madame Angot's Daughter (1935)
- A Rare Bird (1935)
- Ferdinand the Roisterer (1935)
- Fanfare of Love (1935)
- Excursion Train (1936)

== Bibliography ==
- Crisp, Colin. French Cinema—A Critical Filmography: Volume 1, 1929-1939. Indiana University Press, 2015.
