= René Dorin =

French chansonnier, screenwriter and playwright

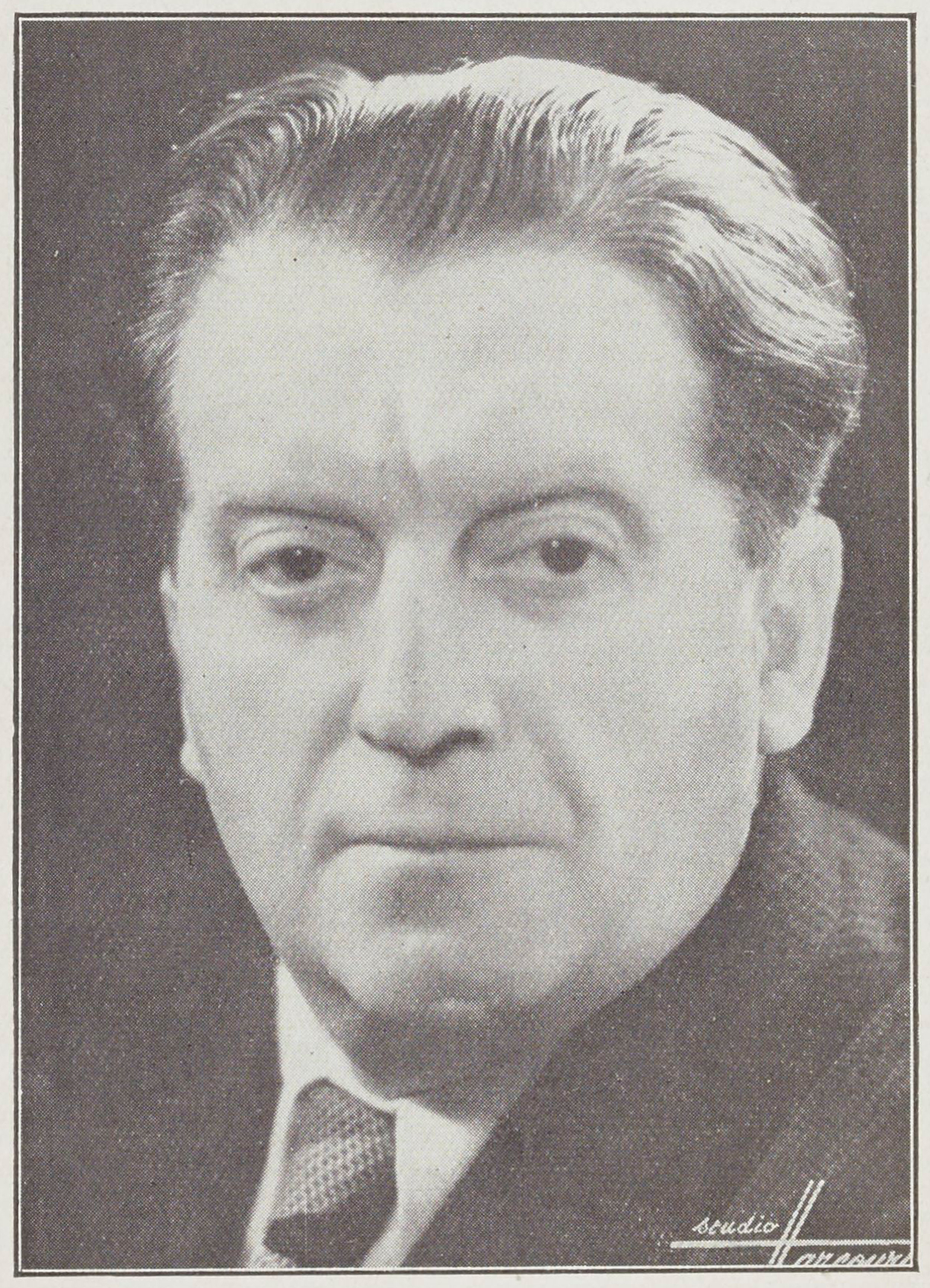
- Born: 13 November 1891; La Rochelle, France
- Died: 25 July 1969 (aged 77); Noisy-le-Grand, France
- Occupations: Chansonnier, screenwriter and playwright

René Dorin (13 November 1891, La Rochelle – 25 July 1969, Noisy-le-Grand) was a 20th-century French chansonnier, screenwriter and playwright. René Dorin was the father of writer André Dorin and comedian, writer and playwright Françoise Dorin.

== Theatre ==
- 1939: Mailloche by René Dorin, Théâtre de la Madeleine

== Cinema ==
- 1932: En lisant le journal, short film by Alberto Cavalcanti (actor and screenwriter)
- 1934: Quatre à Troyes, by Pierre-Jean Ducis (actor and screenwriter)
- 1934: Voilà Montmartre
- 1934: Les Géants de la route, by Pierre-Jean Ducis (actor and screenwriter)
- 1940: Radio Surprises, by Marcel Aboulker (actor, as himself)
