= Return to Happiness =

1942 film

- Directed by: René Jayet
- Written by: René Jayet; Valentine Pley; Claude Revol; Marianne Testa
- Produced by: Valentine Pley
- Starring: Jules Berry; Suzy Vernon; Gina Manès
- Cinematography: Marc Bujard
- Edited by: Pierre Gérau
- Music by: Henri Martinet; Rinaldo Rinaldi
- Production company: Films Comète
- Distributed by: Les Films Georges Muller
- Release date: 9 April 1942
- Running time: 92 minutes
- Country: France
- Language: French

Return to Happiness (French: Retour au bonheur) is a 1942 French comedy drama film directed by René Jayet and starring Jules Berry, Suzy Vernon and Gina Manès. The film's sets were designed by the art director Marcel Magniez. It is also known by the alternative title L'enfant dans la tourmente.

== Cast ==
- Jules Berry as Bertini
- Suzy Vernon as Madeleine Dorval
- Gina Manès as Mélie
- Jean Debucourt as Jacques Dorval
- Gabriel Farguette as Jean
- Charlotte Lysès as Aglaé
- René Génin as Célestin
- René Daix as Georges Dorval
- Jacques Henley as Saxton

== Bibliography ==
- Rège, Philippe. Encyclopedia of French Film Directors, Volume 1. Scarecrow Press, 2009.
