= Jackie Monnier =

French actress

- Born: 2 December 1903; Louveciennes, Yvelines, France
- Died: 20 July 1983 (aged 79); Millemont, Yvelines, France
- Occupation: Actress
- Writing career
- Years active: 1926–1933 (film)

Jackie Monnier (1903–1983) was a French film actress active during the late silent and early sound era. She starred in two films directed by Jean Renoir including the 1929 film Le Bled set in French Algeria. Another appearance was in the 1930 First World War film Westfront 1918 by Georg Wilhelm Pabst.

== Selected filmography ==
- Mon frère Jacques (1926)
- The Chess Player (1927)
- Le tournoi (1928)
- In the Shadow of the Harem (1928)
- Le Bled (1929)
- Three Days of Life and Death (1929)
- La revanche du maudit (1930)
- Westfront 1918 (1930)
- David Golder (1931)
- The Improvised Son (1932)
- Nothing But Lies (1933)
- My Hat (1933)

== Bibliography ==
- Bergan, Ronald. Jean Renoir: Projections of Paradise. Skyhorse, 2016.
- Kester, Bernadette. Film Front Weimar: Representations of the First World War in German films of the Weimar Period (1919-1933). Amsterdam University Press, 2003.
- Neupert, Richard. French Film History, 1895–1946. University of Wisconsin Pres, 2022.
