= Paul Colline =

French actor and screenwriter

- Born: September 22nd, 1895
- Died: November 8th, 1991
- Other names: Paul Louis Élisé Duard
- Occupation(s): Actor and Screenwriter

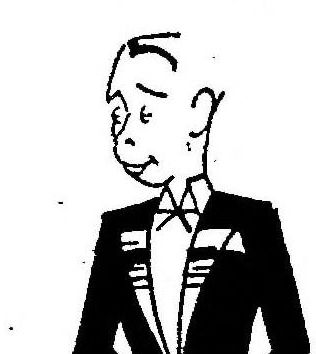
Paul Colline au théâtre de l'Humour

Paul Colline (stage name of Paul Louis Élisé Duard; 22 September 1895 in Paris – 8 November 1991 in Paris) was a French actor and screenwriter.

== Selected filmography ==
- The Three Musketeers (1932)
- Skylark (1934)
- Voilà Montmartre (1934)
- Adémaï in the Middle Ages (1935)
- The Atomic Monsieur Placido (1950)
- Adémaï au poteau-frontière (1950)
