= Edith Méra =

Austrian actress

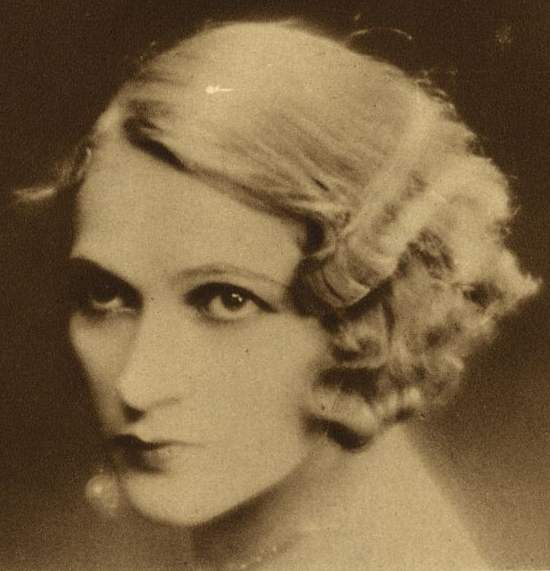
- Born: Edith Claire Zeibert; 7 February 1905; Meran, South Tyrol, Austria-Hungarian Empire
- Died: 24 February 1935 (aged 30); Paris, France
- Occupation: Actress
- Years active: 1931–1935 (film)

Edith Méra (1905–1935) was an Austrian actress known for her roles in French films.

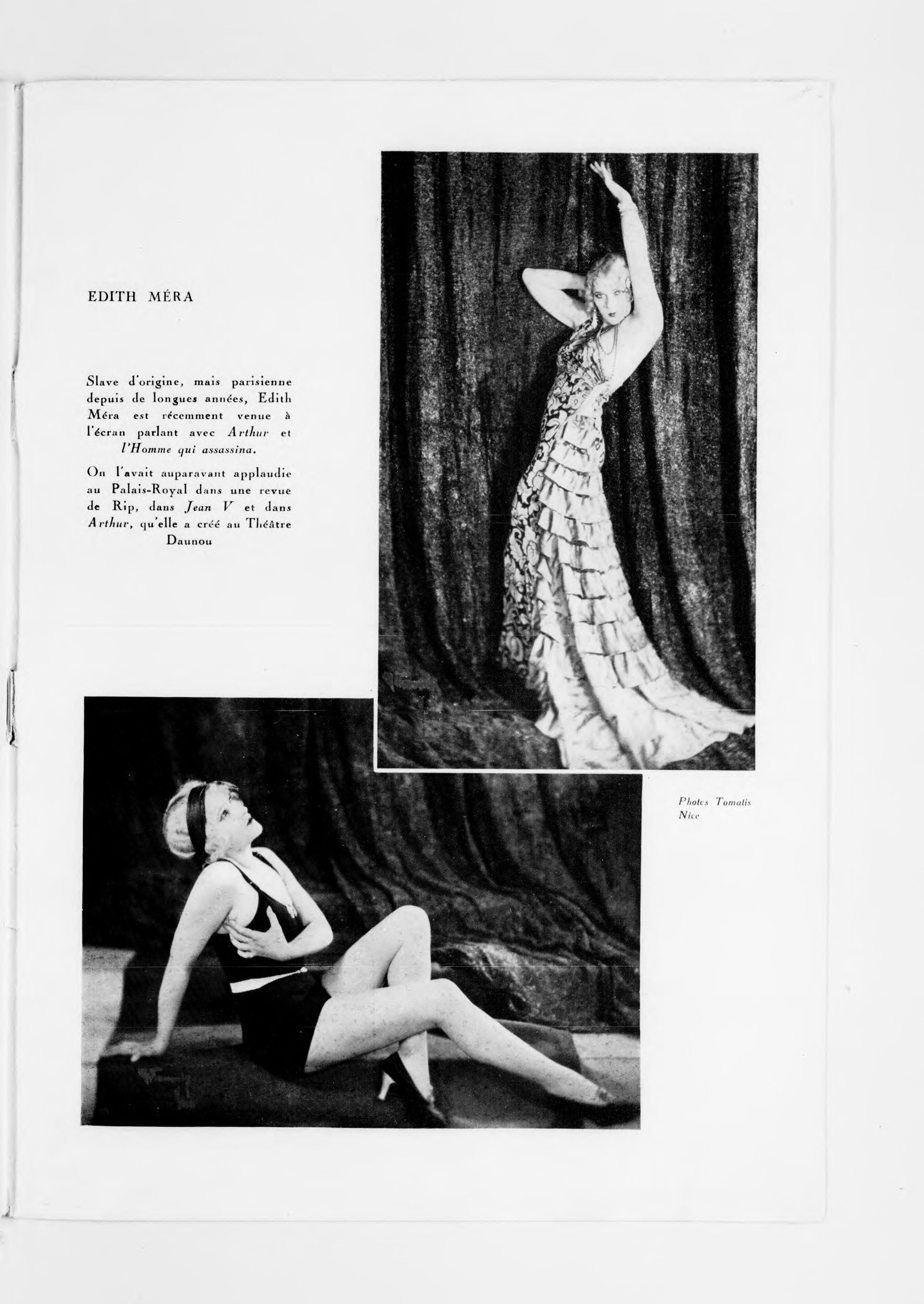
Edith Méra in the French magazine Cinéa in March 1931.

== Selected filmography ==
- A Star Disappears (1932)
- Miche (1932)
- The Three Musketeers (1932)
- Dream Castle (1933)
- Simone Is Like That (1933)
- The Premature Father (1933)
- Mademoiselle Josette, My Woman (1933)
- Fedora (1934)
- Poliche (1934)
- The Midnight Prince (1934)
- Count Obligado (1935)

== Bibliography ==
- John T. Soister. Conrad Veidt on Screen: A Comprehensive Illustrated Filmography. McFarland, 2002.
