= To Be Loved (film) =

1933 film

- Directed by: Jacques Tourneur
- Written by: Jacques Célérier; Henry d'Erlanger
- Produced by: Jacques Natanson
- Starring: Pierre Richard-Willm; Suzy Vernon; Colette Darfeuil
- Cinematography: Georges Raulet
- Edited by: Claude Ibéria
- Music by: Georges Célérier
- Production company: Via Films
- Distributed by: Pathé Consortium Cinéma
- Release date: 27 October 1933
- Running time: 75 minutes
- Country: France
- Language: French

To Be Loved (French: Pour être aimé) is a 1933 French comedy film directed by Jacques Tourneur and starring Pierre Richard-Willm, Suzy Vernon and Colette Darfeuil.

The film's sets were designed by the art director Pierre Schild.

== Synopsis ==
In order to be loved for himself rather than his money, a young millionaire gets a job working as a barman.

== Cast ==
- Pierre Richard-Willm as Gérard d'Ormoise
- Suzy Vernon as Edith
- Marguerite Moreno as Marie-Josèphe des Espinettes
- Colette Darfeuil as Maud
- Paulette Dubost as Maryse
- Fred Pasquali as Emilien
- Jean Hubert as Victor
- Marthe Sarbel as Mme. Costebrave
- William Aguet as Anthénor de la Chaulme-Percée
- Heritza as Chanteuse
- Pierre Juvenet as Costebrave
- Georges Tréville as Weston

== Bibliography ==
- Parish, James Robert & Pitts, Michael R. Film directors: a guide to their American films. Scarecrow Press, 1974.
