= Dream Castle (film) =

1933 film directed by Géza von Bolváry

- Directed by: Géza von Bolváry
- Written by: Henri-Georges Clouzot; Hans H. Zerlett
- Produced by: Siegfried Fritz Fromm
- Starring: Edith Méra; Lucien Baroux; Danielle Darrieux
- Cinematography: Fritz Arno Wagner
- Edited by: Hermann Haller
- Music by: Franz Grothe
- Production companies: UFA; Boston Film
- Distributed by: L'Alliance Cinématographique Européenne
- Release date: 8 December 1933
- Running time: 85 minutes
- Country: Germany
- Language: French

Dream Castle (French: Château de rêve) is a 1933 comedy film directed by Géza von Bolváry and starring Edith Méra, Lucien Baroux, and Danielle Darrieux. It was produced in Berlin as the French-language version of The Castle in the South and released by UFA's French subsidiary.

The film's sets were designed by the art director Emil Hasler.

== Cast ==
- Edith Méra as Maria Foreni
- Lucien Baroux as Ottoni, the cameraman
- Danielle Darrieux as Béatrix
- Adrien Le Gallo as Baron Billichini
- Pierre Sergeol as Déri
- Marcel André as Le metteur en scène / The film director
- Roger Dann as Tonio
- Théo Tony as Directeur de production / The producer
- Vivian Grey as Bianca
- Jaque Catelain as Prince Mirano

== Bibliography ==
- Waldman, Harry (2008). Nazi Films in America, 1933–1942. Jefferson, NC: McFarland. ISBN 978-0-7864-3861-7.
