= The Man in Evening Clothes =

1931 film

- Directed by: René Guissart
- Written by: Yves Mirande (play); André Picard (play); John McDermott; Saint-Granier
- Starring: Fernand Gravey; Diana; Suzy Vernon
- Music by: Charles Borel-Clerc; Lionel Cazaux; Casimir Oberfeld
- Production company: Paramount Pictures
- Distributed by: Paramount Pictures
- Release date: June 26, 1931
- Running time: 88 minutes
- Country: United States
- Language: French

The Man in Evening Clothes (French:Un homme en habit) is a 1931 American pre-Code comedy film directed by René Guissart, in his directorial debut, and starring Fernand Gravey, Diana and Suzy Vernon. It was made by the French subsidiary of Paramount Pictures at the Joinville Studios in Paris. A Spanish-language version A Gentleman in Tails was also released the same year.

The film adapts L'Homme en habit, a play by Yves Mirande and André Picard.

It is presumably lost.

== Cast ==
- Fernand Gravey as André de Lussanges
- Diana as Gaby
- Suzy Vernon as Germaine de Lussanges
- Pola Illéry as Totoche
- Pierre Etchepare as Pierre d'Allouville
- Louis Baron fils as L'huissier Buffetaut
- Jany Holt as Ninette
- Paul Pauley as Le valet de chambre
- Jeanne Fusier-Gir
- Alexandre Dréan
- Marc-Hély
- Pierrette Caillol
- Marcel Carpentier
- Georges Bever
- Henry Prestat
- Georges Cahuzac
- Charlotte Martens
- Henri Vilbert
- Christian Argentin
- Francis Mérey
- Poussard
- Henri Trévoux
- André Pollack
- Henri Jullien
- Henri de Livry

== Reception ==
In 1932, Hebdo-film found it was "one of the best films of the year".

== Bibliography ==
- Goble, Alan. The Complete Index to Literary Sources in Film. Walter de Gruyter, 1999.
