= Alexandre Dréan =

French actor and singer (1884–1977)

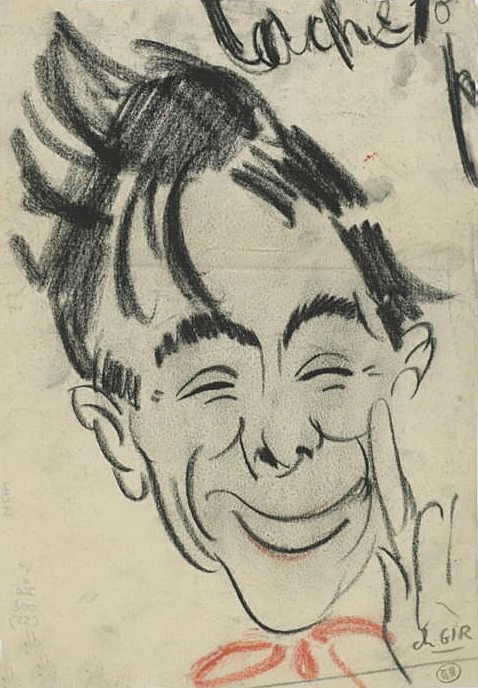
- Caricature par Charles Gir.
- Born: Roch-Alexandre Vincentelli; 12 November 1884; Marseille
- Died: 8 March 1977 (aged 92); Corbeil-Essonnes
- Occupation(s): Actor; Singer

Alexandre Dréan, or simply Dréan, (12 November 1884 – 8 March 1977) was a 20th-century French actor and singer.

His interpretation of the operetta Phi-Phi in 1920 made him popular.

His best-known songs are Cache ton piano and Elle s'était fait couper les cheveux.

== Filmography ==
- 1913: Le Fils de Lagardère : Passepoil
- 1930: Bon appétit, messieurs
- 1931: The Man in Evening Clothes
- 1931: When Do You Commit Suicide?
- 1931: Delphine : Papillon
- 1932: Le Vendeur du Louvre : Le vendeur
- 1932: Aces of the Turf : Papillon
- 1932: A Star Disappears : Claudius
- 1932: Une jeune fille et un million
- 1933: Rivaux de la piste : Paradis
- 1933: The Case of Doctor Brenner
- 1934: The Bread Peddler : Cricri
- 1936: Les Frères Delacloche
- 1952: The Nude Dancer : Gallus
- 1953: Soyez les bienvenus
- 1959: The Gendarme of Champignol : le docteur
- 1962: Un cheval pour deux : le voisin
