= Voilà Montmartre =

1934 film

- Directed by: Roger Capellani
- Produced by: Antoine Rasimi
- Starring: Marguerite Moreno; Dominique Bonnaud; Pierre Dac
- Music by: Albert Chantrier
- Production company: Compagnie Internationale de Transactions Artistiques et Cinématographiques
- Release date: 11 May 1934
- Running time: 90 minutes
- Country: France
- Language: French

Voilà Montmartre is a 1934 French musical comedy film directed by Roger Capellani and starring Marguerite Moreno, Dominique Bonnaud and Pierre Dac. It is a revue film featuring a series of sketches. Like the 1941 film Three Argentines in Montmartre it is set in Montmartre and showcases a number of contemporary cabaret performers.

== Cast ==
- Dominique Bonnaud
- Raymond Bour
- Géo Charley
- Paul Colline
- Pierre Dac
- René Dorin
- Roger Ferréol
- Frédérique
- Robert Goupil
- Géo Lip
- Jean Marsac
- Mauricet
- Morelly
- Marguerite Moreno
- Philippe Olive
- Nicole Ray
- Max Révol
- Toulousain

== Bibliography ==
- Bessy, Maurice & Chirat, Raymond. Histoire du cinéma français: 1929-1934. Pygmalion, 1988.
- Crisp, Colin. Genre, Myth and Convention in the French Cinema, 1929-1939. Indiana University Press, 2002.
- Hewitt, Nicholas. Montmartre: A Cultural History. Oxford University Press, 2017.
- Rège, Philippe. Encyclopedia of French Film Directors, Volume 1. Scarecrow Press, 2009.
