= Catherine Erard =

French actress (1928–2009)

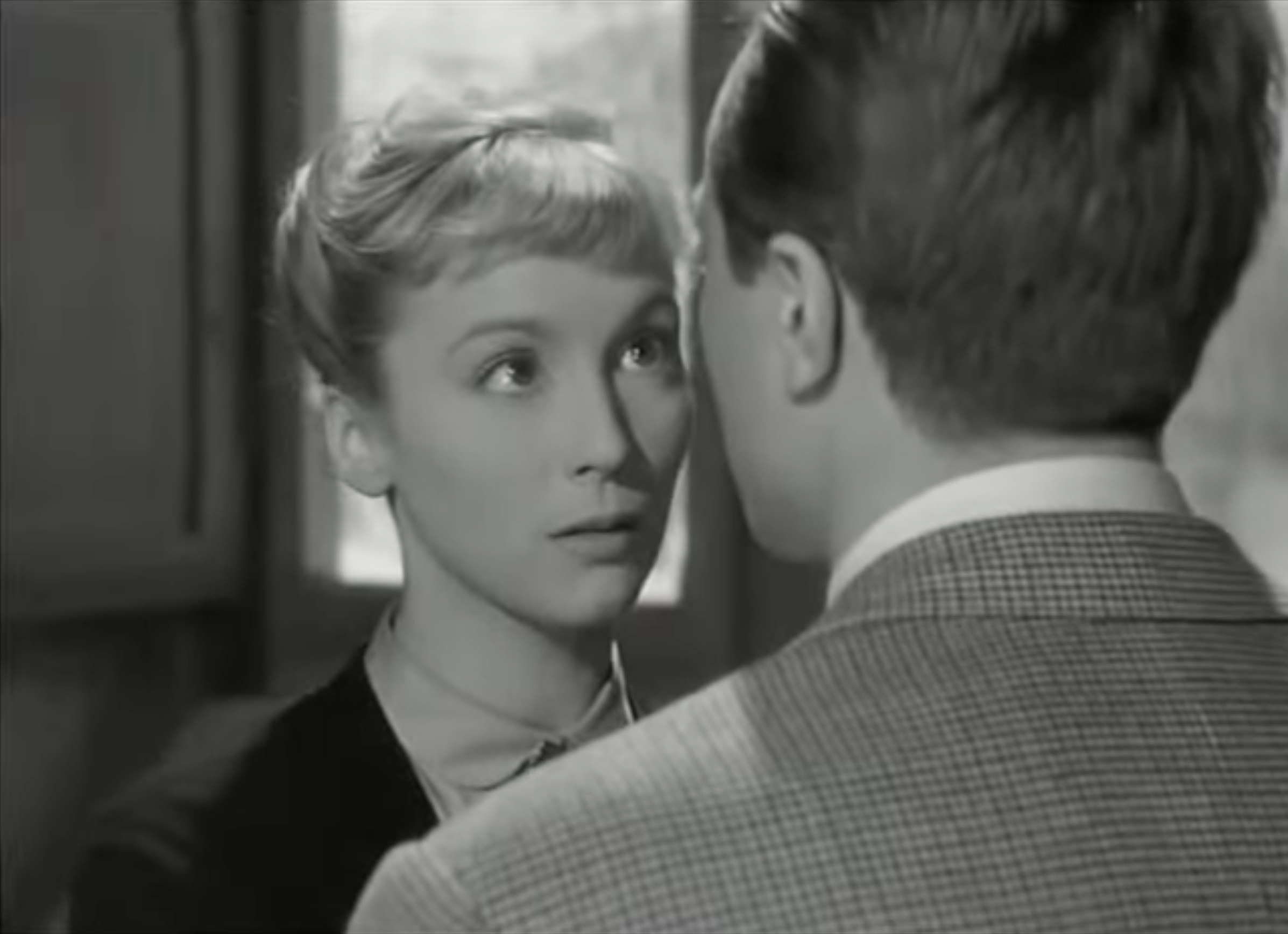
- Erard in Saluti e baci (1953)
- Born: 23 March 1928; Strasbourg, France
- Died: 27 March 2009 (aged 81); Nancy, France
- Occupation: Actress
- Years active: 1947–1959 (film & TV)

Catherine Erard (1928–2009) was a French film and stage actress. She played the female lead in a number of films during the 1950s.

== Selected filmography ==
- Loves, Delights and Organs (1947)
- Young Love (1951)
- Three Women (1952)
- The Nude Dancer (1952)
- The Crime of Bouif (1952)
- Midnight Witness (1953)
- Saluti e baci (1953) Greetings and Kisses
- Les hommes ne pensent qu'à ça (1954) Men Think Only About That

== Bibliography ==
- Goble, Alan. The Complete Index to Literary Sources in Film. Walter de Gruyter, 1999.
- Paietta, Ann C. Teachers in the Movies: A Filmography of Depictions of Grade School, Preschool and Day Care Educators, 1890s to the Present. McFarland, 2007.
