= Henri Garat =

French actor and singer

Henri Garat (born Henri Garascu; 3 April 1902 in Paris – 13 August 1959) was a French actor and singer of Romanian origin.

== Selected filmography ==
- The Road to Paradise (1930)
- Our Masters, the Servants (1930)
- The Girl and the Boy (1931)
- Princess, At Your Orders! (1931)
- Caught in the Act (1931)
- Delphine (1931)
- Students in Paris (1932)
- Congress Dances (1932)
- A Star Disappears (1932)
- He Is Charming (1932)
- Simone Is Like That (1933)
- The Midnight Prince (1934)
- A Man Has Been Stolen (1934)
- Royal Waltz (1936)
- The Blue Mouse (1936)
- Counsel for Romance (1936)
- Madelon's Daughter (1937)
- Chaste Susanne (1937)
- The Girl in the Taxi (1937)
- In the Sun of Marseille (1938)
- That's Sport (1938)
- The President (1938)
- The Path of Honour (1939)
- The Master Valet (1941)
- Annette and the Blonde Woman (1942)
- Madly in Love (1943)
