= Adémaï au poteau-frontière =

- Directed by: Paul Colline
- Written by: Paul Colline
- Produced by: Eole Films
- Starring: Paul Colline; Louis de Funès
- Music by: Francis López
- Release date: 4 September 1950
- Running time: 96 minutes
- Country: France
- Language: French

Adémaï au poteau-frontière English: Ademaï in the frontier post, is a French comedy film from 1950, directed by Paul Colline, written by Paul Colline, and starring Colline as a peasant and featuring Louis de Funès as a soldier.

== Synopsis ==
The peasant Adémaï, returning home, gets lost in the forest and knocks down a border post. In his haste to replant it, he installs it upside down. The patrols of the two bordering - and antagonistic - countries replant the border post facing in a different direction each time they pass it. War becomes more and more likely as the border is repeatedly violated.

== Cast ==
- Paul Colline as Adémaï, the peasant
- Sophie Carral as the female smuggler
- Noël Roquevert
- Jean Richard
- Thérèse Aspar
- Louis de Funès : soldier (uncredited)
- Simone Duhart
- Alice Leitner
- Paul Barre
- Raymond Girard
- Max Revol
- Suzanne Grujon
- Jacques Mareuil
- Rivers Cadet
- Maurice Schutz
- René Lecuyer
