= The Castle in the South =

1933 film directed by Géza von Bolváry

- Directed by: Géza von Bolváry
- Written by: Hans H. Zerlett
- Produced by: Siegfried Fritz Fromm; Heinz Paul
- Starring: Liane Haid; Viktor de Kowa; Paul Kemp
- Cinematography: Fritz Arno Wagner
- Edited by: Hermann Haller
- Music by: Franz Grothe
- Production company: Boston-Film
- Distributed by: UFA
- Release date: 16 November 1933
- Running time: 90 minutes
- Country: Germany
- Language: German

The Castle in the South (German: Das Schloß im Süden) is a 1933 German comedy film directed by Géza von Bolváry and starring Liane Haid, Viktor de Kowa, and Paul Kemp. A separate French-language version Château de rêve was also produced and released by UFA's French subsidiary. It was made at the Tempelhof Studios in Berlin while location shooting took place in Dalmatia and at Rügen in Pomerania. The film's sets were designed by the art director Emil Hasler.

== Synopsis ==
On a film shoot in the Adriatic, an actress falls for a film extra who turns out to be a Prince.

== Cast ==
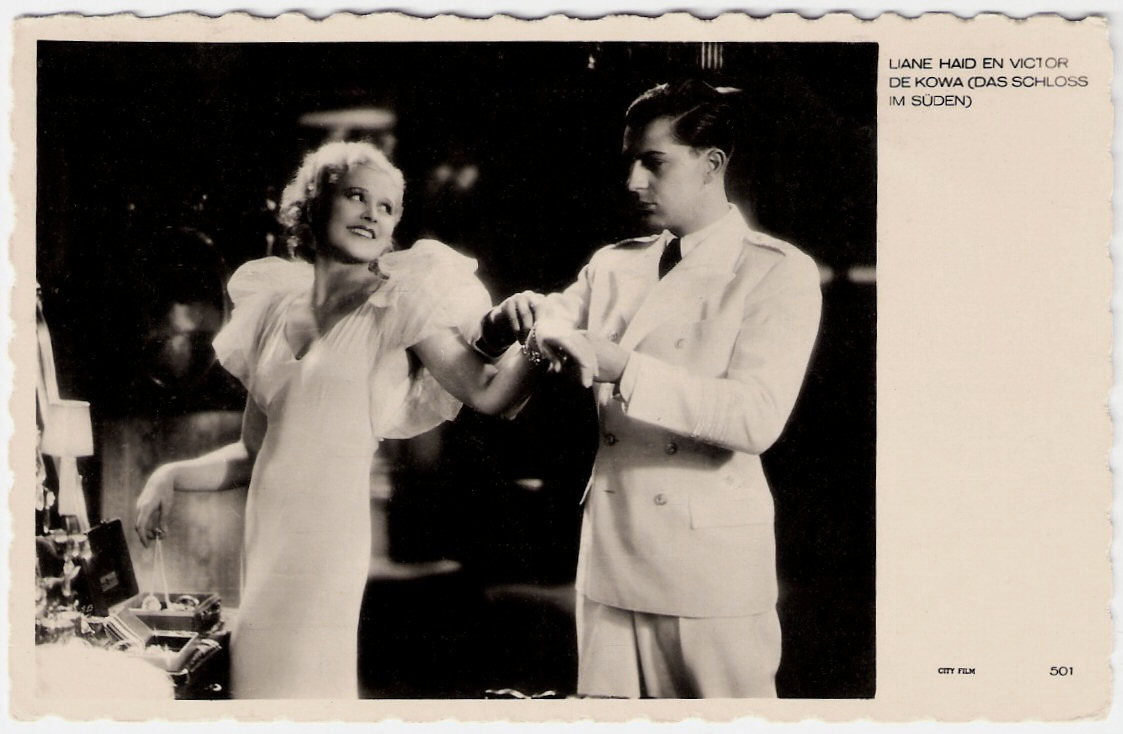
Liane Haid and Viktor de Kowa in a promotional photograph

- Liane Haid as Maria Foreni
- Viktor de Kowa as Mirano
- Paul Kemp as Ottoni
- Max Gülstorff as Baron Billichini
- Helke Jürgensen as Beatrix
- Erik Ode as Tonio
- Fritz Odemar as Der Regisseur
- Erich Kestin as Der Aufnahmeleiter
- Paul Westermeier as Deri
- Jessie Vihrog as Bianca

== Bibliography ==
- Waldman, Harry (2008). Nazi Films in America, 1933–1942. Jefferson, NC: McFarland. ISBN 978-0-7864-3861-7.
- Klaus, Ulrich J. Deutsche Tonfilme: Jahrgang 1933. Klaus-Archiv, 1988.
