= Midnight Witness =

1953 film

- Directed by: Dimitri Kirsanoff
- Written by: René Barjavel; Morvan Lebesque
- Produced by: Guy Diamant; Jean Lefait
- Starring: Henri Guisol; Claude May; Catherine Erard
- Cinematography: Roger Fellous
- Edited by: Jacqueline Sadoul
- Music by: Raymond Legrand
- Production company: Paris-Monde-Production
- Distributed by: L'Alliance Générale de Distribution Cinématographique
- Release date: 13 February 1953
- Running time: 80 minutes
- Country: France
- Language: French

Midnight Witness (French: Le témoin de minuit) is a 1953 French crime drama film directed by Dimitri Kirsanoff and starring Henri Guisol, Claude May and Catherine Erard. The film's sets were designed by the art director Jean Douarinou; costumes were designed by Pierre Balmain. Location shooting took place around Louveciennes.

== Cast ==
- Henri Guisol as Jacques Montet
- Claude May as Madame Montet
- Catherine Erard as Muriel
- Raymond Pellegrin as Roger Noël
- Roland Alexandre as L'aviateur
- María Riquelme as Mimi
- Marcel Josz as L'inspecteur de police
- Jean Hébey as Filmont - l'éditeur
- Raymond Girard as Le marquis
- Germaine Reuver as Léone - la bonne
- André Numès Fils as L'agent de police
- Guy Favières as Le jardinier
- Louis Lions as Le docteur
- Bernard Musson as Le pharmacien

== Bibliography ==
- Oscherwitz, Dayna & Higgins, MaryEllen. The A to Z of French Cinema. Scarecrow Press, 2009.
- Phillips, Alastair. Rififi: French Film Guide. I.B.Tauris, 2009.
- Rège, Philippe. Encyclopedia of French Film Directors, Volume 1. Scarecrow Press, 2009.
