= Suzy Vernon =

French actress (1901–1997)

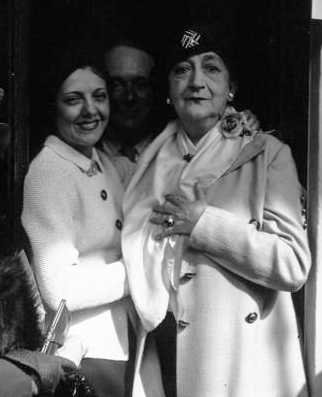
- Suzy Vernon (left) with Marguerite Moreno in 1934
- Born: 26 June 1901; Perpignan, Pyrénées-Orientales, France
- Died: 24 January 1997 (aged 95); Mougins, Alpes-Maritimes, France
- Occupation: Actress
- Years active: 1923–1942 (film)

Suzy Vernon (1901–1997) was a French film actress. Vernon was born Amelie Paris in Perpignan in Southern France. She began her screen career in 1923 during the silent era and went on to appear in just under fifty films. She generally played the female lead, although she occasionally also appeared in supporting roles.

== Selected filmography ==
- The Portrait (1923)
- Faces of Children (1925)
- Barocco (1925)
- The Revenge of the Pharaohs (1925)
- Nitchevo (1926)
- The Bordello in Rio (1927)
- Martyr (1927)
- Napoléon (1927)
- The Last Waltz (1927)
- Sajenko the Soviet (1928)
- The Gambling Den of Montmartre (1928)
- Guilty (1928)
- The President (1928)
- Because I Love You (1928)
- Indizienbeweis (1929)
- A Foolish Maiden (1929)
- The Green Monocle (1929)
- Counter Investigation (1930)
- The Rebel (1931)
- The Man in Evening Clothes (1931)
- Miche (1932)
- Sergeant X (1932)
- A Star Disappears (1932)
- To Be Loved (1933)
- The Porter from Maxim's (1933)
- A Man of Gold (1934)
- Adémaï in the Middle Ages (1935)
- The Scandalous Couple (1935)
- Bux the Clown (1935)
- Napoléon Bonaparte (1935)
- Wells in Flames (1937)
- Return to Happiness (1942)

== Bibliography ==
- Crisp, C.G. The classic French cinema, 1930-1960. Indiana University Press, 1993
- Powrie, Phil & Rebillard, Éric. Pierre Batcheff and stardom in 1920s French cinema. Edinburgh University Press, 2009
