= Three Argentines in Montmartre =

1941 film

- Directed by: André Hugon
- Written by: Diez de las Heras
- Produced by: André Hugon
- Starring: George Rigaud; Paloma de Sandoval; Pierre Brasseur
- Cinematography: Raymond Agnel
- Edited by: Pierre Weill
- Music by: José Sentís
- Production company: Productions André Hugon
- Distributed by: Cinéma de France
- Release date: 14 January 1941
- Running time: 92 minutes
- Country: France
- Language: French

Three Argentines in Montmartre (Spanish: Trois Argentins à Montmartre) is a 1941 French musical drama film directed by André Hugon and starring George Rigaud, Paloma de Sandoval and Pierre Brasseur. The film's sets were designed by the art director Lucien Jaquelux. As with the 1934 film Voilà Montmartre, the plot provides a format for a number of performances by contemporary cabaret stars.

== Synopsis ==
Three Argentines head to Paris hoping for success. They take lodgings in a boarding house in Montmartre where they encounter a number of fellow performers, and meet the singer Maria-Rosa with whom they end up creating a hit number.

== Cast ==
- George Rigaud as Gaston
- Paloma de Sandoval as Maria-Rosa
- Pierre Brasseur as Toninett
- Milly Mathis as Mathilde
- Oscar Aleman as Moncho
- Rafael Medina as Roberto
- Édouard Delmont as Sacrifice
- Óscar Alemán as Moncho

== Bibliography ==
- Bessy, Maurice & Chirat, Raymond. Histoire du cinéma français: encyclopédie des films, 1940–1950. Pygmalion, 1986.
- Hewitt, Nicholas. Montmartre: A Cultural History. Oxford University Press, 2017.
- Rège, Philippe. Encyclopedia of French Film Directors, Volume 1. Scarecrow Press, 2009.
