= Schmilblick =

Imaginary object

The Schmilblick is an imaginary object first described in a nonsense prose by the French humorist Pierre Dac during the 1950s. According to its creator, the Schmilblick can be used in almost any occasion, therefore being strictly indispensable. Dac himself credits the fictional brothers Jules and Raphaël Fauderche with its invention ("Fauderche" means "Fake arse" in French, more commonly "faux cul" which has the sense of "hypocrite").

The Schmilblick resurfaced in 1969, in a TV show by Guy Lux and Jacques Antoine entitled Le Schmilblic (sometimes spelled Schmilblik or Schmilblick). The aim of the game was to guess the name of an object given some of its characteristics (color, shape, use and so on). This TV game actually re-uses an idea from an old radio show called Tirlipot created several years before.

The word quickly became very popular in French language and was sometimes used as a placeholder name, particularly for a strange or unknown object similar to English words like "thingamajig" or "whatchamacallit". The words nowadays remains occasionally used to refer to some limited help provided by someone to solve a difficult problem. The actual idiom is faire avancer le schmilblick ("to make the schmilblick move/get ahead", literally) and was used a lot in the TV quiz show where it meant asking a pertinent question that might make it easier to guess the object.

Coluche used this word in one of his sketches, a parody of Guy Lux's show.

== See also ==
- MacGuffin
- Schtroumpf
