= Raymond Girard =

French actor (1901–1989)

- Born: 11 November 1901; Paris, France
- Died: 18 February 1989 (aged 87); Paris, France
- Other name: Raymond Sébastien Girard
- Occupation: Actor
- Years active: 1928-1975 (film )

Raymond Girard (1901–1989) was a French film and stage actor.

== Filmography ==
Year	Title	Role	Notes
1947	The Husbands of Leontine	Plantain	
1950	Shot at Dawn	Le colonel	
1950	Blonde		
1950	Adémaï au poteau-frontière		
1951	Tapage nocturne	Me Gilbert Sauvin	
1952	Imperial Violets	Prosper Mérimée	
1953	Midnight Witness	Le marquis	
1954	The Count of Monte Cristo	Un pair de France (2)	Uncredited
1955	La Rue des bouches peintes		
1958	Madame et son auto	M. Préfailles	
1974	Stavisky	Dr. Pierre	
1975	Let Joy Reign Supreme	Chirac	(final film role)

== Bibliography ==
- Hayward, Susan. French Costume Drama of the 1950s: Fashioning Politics in Film. Intellect Books, 2010.
