= Fernand Gravey =

Belgian actor (1905–1970)

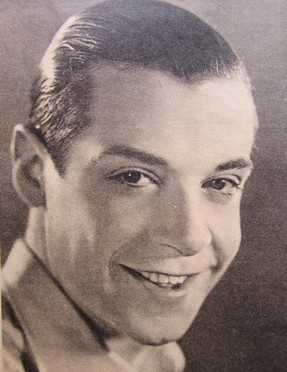
- Born: 25 December 1905; Ixelles, Belgium
- Died: 2 November 1970 (aged 64); Paris, France
- Occupation: Actor
- Years active: 1913–1970
- Spouse: Jane Renouardt (1936-1966) (divorced)

Fernand Gravey (25 December 1905 in Ixelles (Belgium) – 2 November 1970 in Paris, France), also known as Fernand Gravet in the United States, was a Belgian-born French actor.

== Early life ==
Gravey was the son of actors Georges Mertens and Fernande Depernay, who appeared in silent films produced by pioneer Belge Cinéma Film (a subsidiary of Pathé).

Gravey started performing at age five under his father's direction.

Before World War I, he received an education in Britain and could speak both French and English fluently, something which became useful in his movie roles. During the war, Gravey served in the British Merchant Navy.

In 1936, he married the French actress Jane Renouardt, who was 15 years his senior. They remained together until his death on 2 November 1970 of a heart attack. Jane died on 3 February 1972. They had no children.

== Film career ==
Gravey performed in four films in 1913 and 1914 (as Fernand Mertens), but his first film of importance was L'Amour Chante, released in 1930. In 1933 he made Bitter Sweet, his first English language movie which became more famous in its 1940 incarnation with Jeanette MacDonald and Nelson Eddy.

In 1937, after several more French and British movies, Gravey went to Hollywood where the spelling of his last name was altered to Gravet, and he became the focus of a rather extensive Hollywood publicity campaign (instructing moviegoers to pronounce his name properly: "Rhymes with Gravy"). Unfortunately for Gravey, he was offered only standard parts, the Gallic lover roles that Louis Jourdan played in the 1950s and 1960s.

The first two films he made in Hollywood were for Warner Brothers: The King and the Chorus Girl (1937), with Joan Blondell and Jane Wyman, and Fools for Scandal (1938), with Carole Lombard and Ralph Bellamy. Gravey then signed with Metro-Goldwyn-Mayer and was cast as Johann Strauss in the expensive biopic The Great Waltz with Luise Rainer and Miliza Korjus.

MGM next planned to star Gravey in a film version of Rafael Sabatini's adventure novel Scaramouche, but instead he returned to France just before the Nazi occupation began. Although he had agreed to appear in German-approved French films, Gravey was an underminer of the invaders as a member of the French Secret Army and the Foreign Legion.

At the end of the war, Gravey was considered a war hero and continued to be featured in French productions such as La Ronde (with Danielle Darrieux), and Royal Affairs in Versailles (1954). Among his last English language performances were How to Steal a Million (1966), Guns for San Sebastian (1968), and The Madwoman of Chaillot (1969), in which he played the police inspector.

== Selected filmography ==
- Loyalty (1914) - Jonge Jefke / Young Jefke
- Love Songs (1930) - Armand Petitjean
- Chérie (1930) - Burton
- Let's Get Married (1931) - Francis Latour
- The Man in Evening Clothes (1931) - André de Lussanges
- You Will Be a Duchess (1932) - Marquis André de la Cour
- Coiffeur pour dames (1932) - Mario
- Passionately (1932) - Robert Perceval
- The Improvised Son (1932) - Fernand Brassart
- I by Day, You by Night (1932) - Albert
- A Star Disappears (1932) - Himself
- Bitter Sweet (1933) - Carl Linden
- The Premature Father (1933) - Édouard Puma & Fred
- Early to Bed (1933) - Carl
- Court Waltzes (1933) - Franz
- C'était un musicien (1933) - Jean
- The Queen's Affair (1934) - Carl
- Night in May (1934) - Le baron Neuhaus
- If I Were Boss (1934) - Henri Janvier
- Antonia (1935) - Le capitaine Douglas Parker
- Monsieur Sans-Gêne (1935) - Fernand Martin
- Variétés (1935) - Pierre
- Touche-à-Tout (1935) - Georges Martin dit Touche-à-Tout
- Fanfare of Love (1935) - Jean
- Seven Men, One Woman (1936) - Brémontier
- The Great Refrain (1936) - Charles Panard - un compositeur de talent
- Compliments of Mister Flow (1936) - Antonin Rose
- The King and the Chorus Girl (1937) - Alfred Bruger VII
- The Lie of Nina Petrovna (1937) - Lieutenant Franz Korff
- Fools for Scandal (1938) - Rene Vilardell
- The Great Waltz (1938) - Johann Strauss
- Le Dernier Tournant (1939) - Frank Maurice
- Paradise Lost (1940) - Le peintre Pierre Leblanc
- Foolish Husbands (1941) - Gérard Barbier
- Romance for Three (1942) - Charles
- La nuit fantastique (1942) - Denis
- Captain Fracasse (1943) - Le baron de Cigognac / Il barone di Sigognac
- Domino (1943) - Dominique
- La Rabouilleuse (1944) - Colonel Philippe Brideau
- Pamela (1945) - Paul Barras
- Once Is Enough (1946) - Jacques Reval
- Captain Blomet (1947) - Blomet
- Du Guesclin (1949) - Bertrand du Guesclin
- La Ronde (1950) - Charles Breitkopf, Emma's Husband
- Mademoiselle Josette, My Woman (1950) - André Ternay
- Gunman in the Streets (1950) - Commissioner Dufresne
- The Hunted (1950) - Commissioner
- My Wife Is Formidable (1951) - Raymond Corbier
- The Happiest of Men (1952) - Armand Dupuis-Martin
- My Husband Is Marvelous (1952) - Claude Chatel
- Too Young for Love (1953) - Padre di Andrea, presidente del tribunale
- Royal Affairs in Versailles (1954) - Molière
- Thirteen at the Table (1955) - Antoine Villardier
- Short Head (1956) - Olivier Parker
- Mitsou ou Comment l'esprit vient aux filles (1956) - Pierre Duroy-Lelong
- The Flapper (1957) - Georges Sauvage
- Le Temps des œufs durs (1958) - Raoul Gandvivier
- School for Coquettes (1958) - Stanislas de La Ferronière
- Toto in Paris (1958) - Il dottor Duclos
- The Crumblers Are Doing Well (1961) - François Legrand
- Girl on the Road (1962) - L'homme à la cadillac
- La Dama de Beirut (1965) - Dr. Castello
- How to Steal a Million (1966) - Grammont
- Guns for San Sebastian (1968) - Governor
- The Madwoman of Chaillot (1969) - Police Sergeant
- Les Caprices de Marie (1970) - Le capitaine Ragot
- Promise at Dawn (1970) - Jean-Michel Serusier
- L'Explosion (1971) - Labrize

== Bibliography ==
- John Holmstrom, The Moving Picture Boy: An International Encyclopaedia from 1895 to 1995, Norwich, Michael Russell, 1996, pp. 23–24.

Trade union offices
Preceded by Gordon Sandison	President of the International Federation of Actors; 1958–1962	Succeeded by Rodolfo Landa
