= Three Days of Life and Death =

1929 film by Heinz Paul

- Directed by: Heinz Paul
- Written by: Hella Moja
- Starring: Carl de Vogt; Angelo Ferrari; Carl Walther Meyer
- Cinematography: Carl Blumenberg; Viktor Gluck
- Production company: Cinéma-Film-Vertriebs
- Release date: 1929
- Running time: 100 minutes
- Country: Germany
- Languages: Silent; German intertitles

Three Days of Life and Death (German: Drei Tage auf Leben und Tod) is a 1929 German silent war film directed by Heinz Paul and starring Carl de Vogt, Angelo Ferrari and Carl Walther Meyer. It was shot at the Johannisthal Studios in Berlin and on location in Cartagena in Spain and around the Adriatic Sea. The film's sets were designed by the art director Karl Machus.

== Cast ==
- Carl de Vogt as Der Kommandant des U.C.1
- Angelo Ferrari as Der Erste Offizier
- Carl Walther Meyer as Der Zweite Offizier
- Fritz Kampers as Der Obermaat
- John Mylong as Der Koch
- Hans Tost as Der Freiwillige
- Arthur Duarte as Ein Torpedomatrose
- Willy Mendau as Eine Ordonanz
- Fritz Beckmann as Der Kapitän des Seglers
- Jackie Monnier as Seine Nichte Jeanette
- Charles Vanel as Der Steuermann
- José Aguëras as Ein Matrose
- H. Schimack as Besatzung von U.C.I.
- P. Buchholz as Besatzung von U.C.I.
- Arthur Reinhardt as Besatzung von U.C.I.
- Walter Dettmann as Besatzung von U.C.I.
- Max Diekmann as Besatzung von U.C.I.
- Veit Masary as Weitere Besatzung von U.C.1

== Bibliography ==
- Kester, Bernadette. Film Front Weimar: Representations of the First World War in German films of the Weimar Period (1919-1933). Amsterdam University Press, 2003.
