= Adémaï in the Middle Ages =

1935 film

- Directed by: Jean de Marguenat
- Written by: Paul Colline; Charles Spaak
- Produced by: Maurice de Canonge; Xavier Revenaz
- Starring: Noël-Noël; Michel Simon; Suzy Vernon
- Cinematography: Fédote Bourgasoff; Paul Portier
- Edited by: Raymond Lamy
- Music by: Marcel Lattès
- Production company: Lutèce Films
- Distributed by: Compagnie Parisienne de Location de Films
- Release date: 25 October 1935
- Running time: 80 minutes
- Country: France
- Language: French

Adémaï in the Middle Ages (French: Adémaï au Moyen-Âge) is a 1935 French historical comedy film directed by Jean de Marguenat and starring Noël-Noël, Michel Simon and Suzy Vernon. It was shot at the Victorine Studios in Nice. The film's sets were designed by the art director Marcel Magniez. It was the second feature film for Adémaï, a character Noël-Noël had developed on the music hall stage, following the previous year's hit Skylark. The Corsican singer and future film star Tino Rossi appears as a troubadour.

== Synopsis ==
In 1429, shortly after the Siege of Orléans during the Hundred Years' War between France and England, the peasant Adémaï's new bride Tiennette is captured by an English lord who coverts her for himself. She is imprisoned in a castle, then rescued by a French force in which two men also desire her and fight each other in a tournament. Adéma meanwhile keeps getting caught up in the fighting between the English and French. When he sees Tiennette leaving with the handsome Philippe de Beauregard, a resigned Adémaï goes to enlist in the forces of Joan of Arc.

== Cast ==
- Noël-Noël as Adémaï
- Michel Simon as Lord Pickwickdam
- Suzy Vernon as Tiennette
- Marguerite Pierry as Miss Crocks
- Jacques Grétillat as Le connétable
- Maurice Maillot as Philippe de Beauregard
- Tino Rossi as Le troubadour
- Raymond Cordy as Le chef de garde
- Maurice de Canonge as Un officier anglais
- Daniel Mendaille as Un chevalier

== Bibliography ==
- Crisp, Colin. Genre, Myth and Convention in the French Cinema, 1929–1939. Indiana University Press, 2002.
- Rège, Philippe. Encyclopedia of French Film Directors, Volume 1. Scarecrow Press, 2009.
