= The Scandalous Couple =

1935 film

- Directed by: Georges Lacombe
- Written by: Fortuné Paillot; Marcel Pollet; Charles Spaak
- Based on: The Scandalous Couple by Fortuné Paillot
- Starring: Suzy Vernon; René Lefèvre; Maurice Escande
- Cinematography: Michel Kelber
- Music by: Marcel Pollet
- Production company: Fina Film Production
- Distributed by: Monopol Film
- Release date: 12 July 1935
- Running time: 90 minutes
- Country: France
- Language: French

The Scandalous Couple (French: Les Epoux scandaleux) is a 1935 French comedy film directed by Georges Lacombe and starring Suzy Vernon, René Lefèvre and Maurice Escande. The film's sets were designed by the art director Roland Quignon.

== Synopsis ==
A couple marry not because they are in love but to escape their respective families. When their car breaks down and they are forced to spend time together in a mountain hotel, their marriage of convenience gradually turns to love.

== Cast ==
- Suzy Vernon as Loulou
- René Lefèvre as Jean
- Maurice Escande as Desbonnières
- Jeanne Aubert as Jeanne Aubry
- Pierre Finaly as Monsieur Desbois
- Marthe Derminy as Madame Gallet
- Madeleine Suffel as Sylvia
- Mona Dol as Madame Moncourt
- Yvonne Yma as La duègne
- Mathilde Alberti as L'aubergiste
- Ketty France as La bonne
- Rose Yssa as La femme de chambre
- Gaston Dupray as Maître Lepoutre
- Marek Liven as Monsieur Michaud
- Paul Forget as L'impresario
- Jean Kolb as Le directeur du théatre
- Jean Valroy as Le régisseur
- Marcel Charvey as Le bijoutier
- Jean Brochard as Un ouvrier
- Charbonnier as Un ouvrier

== Bibliography ==
- Bessy, Maurice & Chirat, Raymond. Histoire du cinéma français: 1935-1939. Pygmalion, 1986.
- Crisp, Colin. French Cinema—A Critical Filmography: Volume 1, 1929-1939. Indiana University Press, 2015.
- Goble, Alan. The Complete Index to Literary Sources in Film. Walter de Gruyter, 1999.
- Rège, Philippe. Encyclopedia of French Film Directors, Volume 1. Scarecrow Press, 2009.
