= Radio Surprises =

1940 film

- Directed by: Marcel Aboulker
- Written by: Pierre Dac; André Gillois; Jean Nohain; Raymond Souplex
- Produced by: Charles Bauche
- Starring: Marguerite Moreno; Armand Bernard; Grégoire Aslan
- Cinematography: René Gaveau
- Edited by: Marguerite Beaugé
- Music by: Pierre Zeppili
- Production company: Productions Charles Bauche
- Distributed by: Distribution Parisienne de Films
- Release date: 8 May 1940
- Running time: 80 minutes
- Country: France
- Language: French

Radio Surprises (French: Les surprises de la radio) is a 1940 French comedy film directed by Marcel Aboulker and starring Marguerite Moreno, Armand Bernard and Grégoire Aslan. It is a revue show. It was shot at the Epinay Studios in Paris. The film's sets were designed by the art director Marcel Magniez.

== Cast ==
- Marguerite Moreno as Herself
- Armand Bernard as M. Bontemps
- Grégoire Aslan as Robert
- Mady Berry as Mme Bontemps
- Balder as Himself
- Georges Briquet as Himself
- Albert Broquin as Le boucher
- Robert Burnier as Himself
- Géo Charley as Himself
- Pierre Dac as Himself
- Claude Dauphin as Himself
- Yves Deniaud as Le facteur
- Rosine Deréan as Herself
- René Dorin as Himself
- Jacqueline Dumonceau as Jacqueline
- Jacqueline Evrard as La chanteuse
- Anthony Gildès as Le grand-père
- Fabien Loris as Deuxième Duettiste
- Blanche Montel as Herself
- René Navarre as Le Secrétaire
- Jean Nohain as Himself
- Frédéric O'Brady as Himself
- Georges Paulais as Le témoin
- Maurice Pierrat as Himself
- Françoise Pomel as Herself
- Geo Pomel as Himself
- Marcel Pérès as Le greffier
- Fernand Rauzéna as Himself
- Jean Rieux as Himself
- Raymond Souplex as Himself
- Jane Sourza as Herself
- Pierre Zeppili as Le chef d'orchestre
- Daniel Gélin as Extra

== Bibliography ==
- Quinlan, David. Quinlan's Film Stars. Batsford, 2000.
