= The King and the Chorus Girl =

1937 film by Mervyn LeRoy

- Fernand Gravey and Joan Blondell in Movie Poster (1937)
- Directed by: Mervyn LeRoy
- Written by: Norman Krasna; Groucho Marx
- Produced by: Mervyn LeRoy
- Starring: Fernand Gravey; Joan Blondell; Edward Everett Horton; Alan Mowbray
- Cinematography: Tony Gaudio
- Edited by: Thomas Richards
- Music by: Werner R. Heymann
- Production company: Warner Bros. Pictures
- Distributed by: Warner Bros. Pictures
- Release date: March 27, 1937
- Running time: 94 minutes
- Country: United States
- Language: English

The King and the Chorus Girl is a 1937 American romantic comedy film directed by Mervyn LeRoy and starring Fernand Gravey, Joan Blondell and Edward Everett Horton.

Gravey (billed as "Gravet") was at the time the subject of a significant studio publicity campaign to build his image.

The film is notable for being the only one with a screenplay officially credited to Groucho Marx.

== Plot ==
Alfred VII is a young and rich deposed king in exile in Paris and monumentally bored. When he becomes involved with a chorus girl whom he accidentally insults (by falling asleep), her indignation provides an opportunity for his loyal courtiers to bring him back to life.

== Cast ==
- Fernand Gravey as Alfred Bruger VII
- Joan Blondell as Miss Dorothy Ellis
- Edward Everett Horton as Count Humbert Evel Bruger
- Alan Mowbray as Donald Taylor
- Mary Nash as Duchess Anna of Elberfield
- Jane Wyman as Babette Latour
- Luis Alberni as Gaston
- Lionel Pape as Professor Kornisch
- Kenny Baker as Folies Bergère Soloist
- Al Shaw and Sam Lee (Shaw and Lee) as Folies Bergère Entertainers
- unbilled players include Virginia Dabney and Carole Landis

== Production ==
The King and the Chorus Girl was in production in early November, and filming wrapped up in late December, 1936.
