= Beautiful Star (1938 film) =

1938 film

- Directed by: Jacques de Baroncelli
- Written by: Michel Duran
- Produced by: François Chavane
- Starring: Michel Simon; Meg Lemonnier; Jean-Pierre Aumont
- Cinematography: Jean Charpentier; Roger Hubert
- Edited by: Jean Hénin
- Music by: Louis Beydts; André Hornez; Paul Misraki; Ray Ventura
- Production company: Éclair-Journal
- Distributed by: Éclair-Journal
- Release date: 24 November 1938
- Running time: 87 minutes
- Country: France
- Language: French

Beautiful Star (French: Belle Étoile) is a 1938 French comedy drama film directed by Jacques de Baroncelli and starring Michel Simon, Meg Lemonnier, and Jean-Pierre Aumont. The film's sets were designed by the art directors Paul-Louis Boutié and Georges Wakhévitch.

== Synopsis ==
Meg Lemarchal doesn't want to marry the man her father has picked out for her. She is driven to suicide, but is saved by a young man Jean-Pierre. However she is then kidnapped, leading to Jean-Pierre trying to rescue her.

== Cast ==
- Michel Simon as Léon
- Meg Lemonnier as Meg Lemarchal
- Jean-Pierre Aumont as Jean-Pierre
- Saturnin Fabre as Lemarchal
- Georges Lannes as Monsieur Albert
- Jean Aymé as Le receleur
- Marcel Vallée as Le président
- André Numès Fils as Charlot
- René Blancard as Le commissaire
- Robert Ralphy as Un passant

== Bibliography ==
- Crisp, Colin. Genre, Myth and Convention in the French Cinema, 1929-1939. Indiana University Press, 2002.
