= Coralie and Company =

1934 film

- Directed by: Alberto Cavalcanti
- Written by: Alberto Cavalcanti
- Based on: Coralie et Cie by Maurice Hennequin and Antony Valabrègue
- Produced by: René Montis; Jean Dehelly
- Starring: Françoise Rosay; Robert Burnier; Josette Day
- Cinematography: Léonce-Henri Burel
- Edited by: Michel Collet
- Music by: Paul Misraki; Georges Van Parys
- Production company: Les Films Jean Dehelly
- Release date: 7 June 1934
- Running time: 102 minutes
- Country: France
- Language: French

Coralie and Company (French: Coralie et Compagnie) is a 1934 French comedy film directed by Alberto Cavalcanti and starring Françoise Rosay, Robert Burnier and Josette Day. It is based on the 1899 play of the same title by Maurice Hennequin and Antony Valabrègue. The film's sets were designed by the art director Jean d'Eaubonne.

== Cast ==
- Françoise Rosay as Madame Coralie
- Robert Burnier as Étienne
- Josette Day as Lulu
- Catherine Hessling as Liane
- Jacques Lerner as M. Brigueil
- Pierre Bertin as Maître Loizeau
- Jeanne Helbling as Clémence
- Daniel Lecourtois as Jacques Dufauret
- Héléna Manson as L'infirmière
- Nina Myral as Tante Laure

== Bibliography ==
- Bessy, Maurice & Chirat, Raymond. Histoire du cinéma français: 1929-1934. Pygmalion, 1988.
- Crisp, Colin. Genre, Myth and Convention in the French Cinema, 1929-1939. Indiana University Press, 2002.
- Goble, Alan. The Complete Index to Literary Sources in Film. Walter de Gruyter, 1999.
- Rège, Philippe. Encyclopedia of French Film Directors, Volume 1. Scarecrow Press, 2009.
