= Meg Lemonnier =

British-born French actress

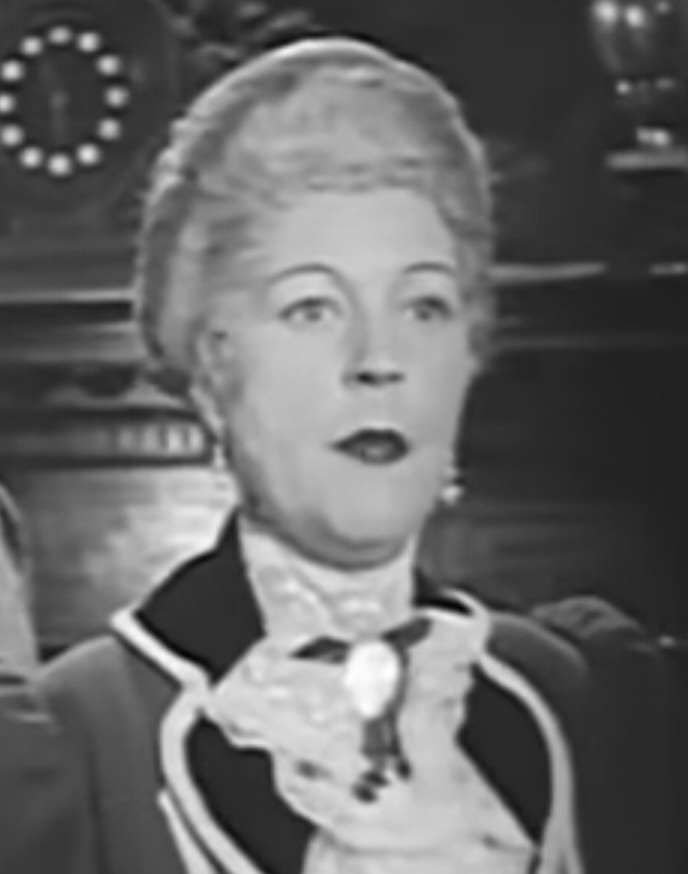
- Lemonnier in an episode of Sherlock Holmes (1954)
- Born: Marguerite Gabrielle Clark; 15 May 1905; London, England
- Died: 12 June 1988 (aged 83); Clichy-la-Garenne, Hauts-de-Seine, France
- Occupation: Actress
- Years active: 1930–1958 (film)

Marguerite Gabrielle Lemonnier (née Clark; 15 May 1905 – 12 June 1988) was a British-born French singer and film actress. Lemonnier played the female lead in the comedy George and Georgette (1933).

== Selected filmography ==
- My Childish Father (1930)
- A Star Disappears (1932)
- Transit Camp (1932)
- Students in Paris (1932)
- He Is Charming (1932)
- George and Georgette (1933)
- Simone Is Like That (1933)
- A Weak Woman (1933)
- Moses and Solomon, Perfumers (1935)
- The Hortensia Sisters (1935)
- The Green Jacket (1937)
- Chaste Susanne (1937)
- La chaste Suzanne (1937)
- Beautiful Star (1938)
- Bolero (1942)
- Don't Shout It from the Rooftops (1943)
- Love Around the Clock (1943)
- Adhémar (1951)
- Maxime (1958)

== Bibliography ==
- Prawer, S.S. Between Two Worlds: The Jewish Presence in German and Austrian Film, 1910–1933. Berghahn Books, 2007.
