= René Guissart (director) =

French film director and cinematographer (1888–1960)

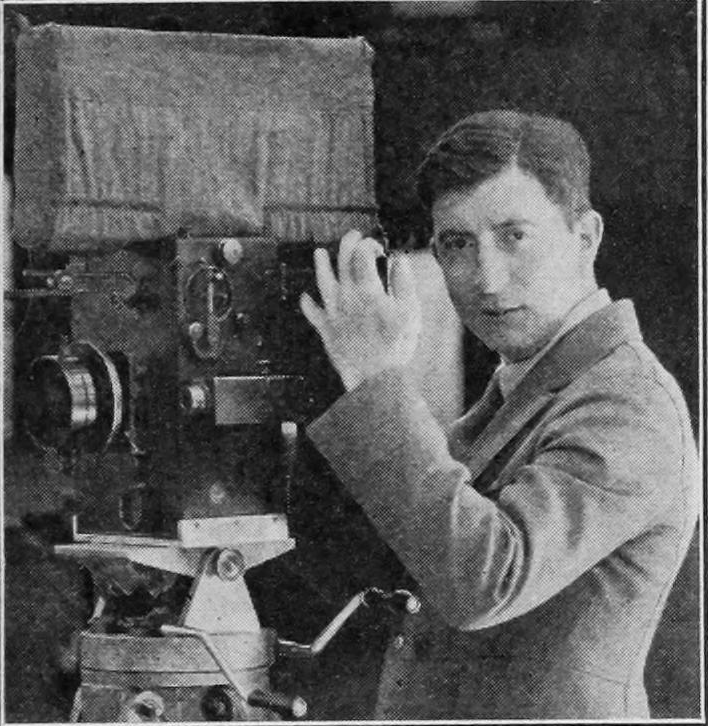
- René Guissart c. 1920
- Born: 24 October 1888; Paris, France
- Died: 19 May 1960 (aged 71); Monaco
- Occupations: Cinematographer; Film director
- Years active: 1916–1939

René Guissart (24 October 1888 – 19 May 1960) was a French film director and cinematographer. During the 1920s and 1930s he worked as cinematographer on numerous British films, many of them for British International Pictures. He also worked on MGM's 1925 epic Ben-Hur. From 1931 Guissart began directing and had made twenty eight films by 1939.

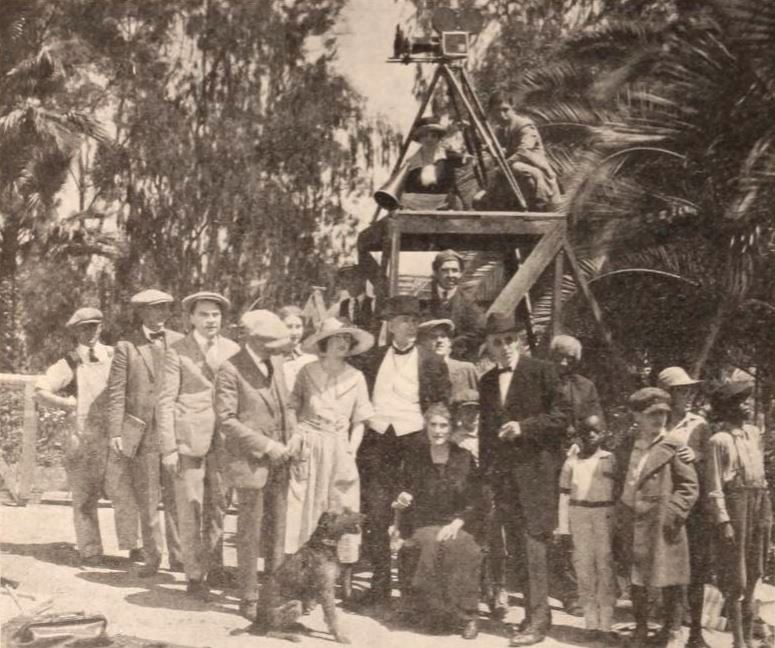
Director Marion Fairfax and René Guissart on the platform for The Lying Truth

== Selected filmography ==
=== Cinematographer ===
- Ambition (1916)
- Love and Hate (1916)
- The Volunteer (1917)
- Adventures of Carol (1917)
- Love Aflame (1917)
- Sister Against Sister (1917)
- Little Women (1918)
- Victory (1919)
- The White Heather (1919)
- My Lady's Garter (1920)
- The Empire of Diamonds (1920)
- Treasure Island (1920)
- Harriet and the Piper (1920)
- The Yellow Typhoon (1920)
- The Butterfly Girl (1921)
- The Money Maniac (1921)
- The Breaking Point (1921)
- Sowing the Wind (1921)
- Flames of Passion (1922)
- The Lying Truth (1922)
- The Bohemian Girl (1922)
- Paddy the Next Best Thing (1923)
- Chu-Chin-Chow (1923)
- While Paris Sleeps (1923)
- Southern Love (1924)
- The Recoil (1924)
- Ben-Hur (1925)
- Madame Sans-Gene (1925)
- Land of Hope and Glory (1927)
- A Little Bit of Fluff (1928)
- The White Sheik (1928)
- Tommy Atkins (1928)
- Adam's Apple (1928)
- Paradise (1928)
- Daughter of the Regiment (1929)
- The American Prisoner (1929)
- The Hate Ship (1929)
- Chérie (1930)
- The Compulsory Husband (1930)
- Raise the Roof (1930)
- The W Plan (1930)
- Tropical Nights (1931)
- Every Woman Has Something (1931)
- Woman in the Jungle (1931)
- A Man Has Been Stolen (1934)
- The Path of Honour (1939)

=== Director ===
- The Man in Evening Clothes (1931)
- Luck (1931)
- The Improvised Son (1932)
- Passionately (1932)
- You Will Be a Duchess (1932)
- The Premature Father (1933)
- The Midnight Prince (1934)
- Primerose (1934)
- Dédé (1935)
- The Hortensia Sisters (1935)
- Speak to Me of Love (1935)
- Dora Nelson (1935)
- You Are Me (1936)
- Ménilmontant (1936)
- Sweet Devil (1938)
- Bourrachon (1938)
- Alexis, Gentleman Chauffeur (1938)

== Bibliography ==
- Phillips, Alastair. City of Darkness, City of Light: Émigré Filmmaker in Paris 1929-1939. Amsterdam University Press, 2004.
