= Joinville Studios =

Film studios located in Paris

- Industry: Film
- Headquarters: Paris, France

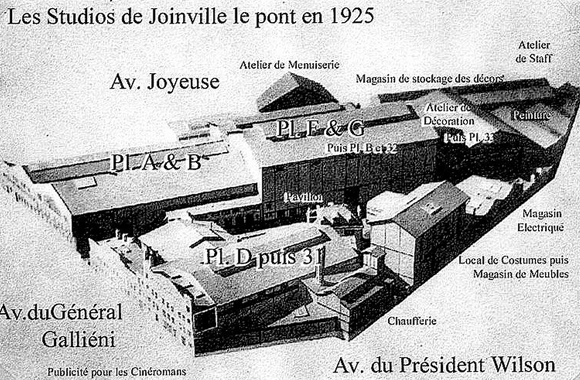
1925 plan of the studio layout

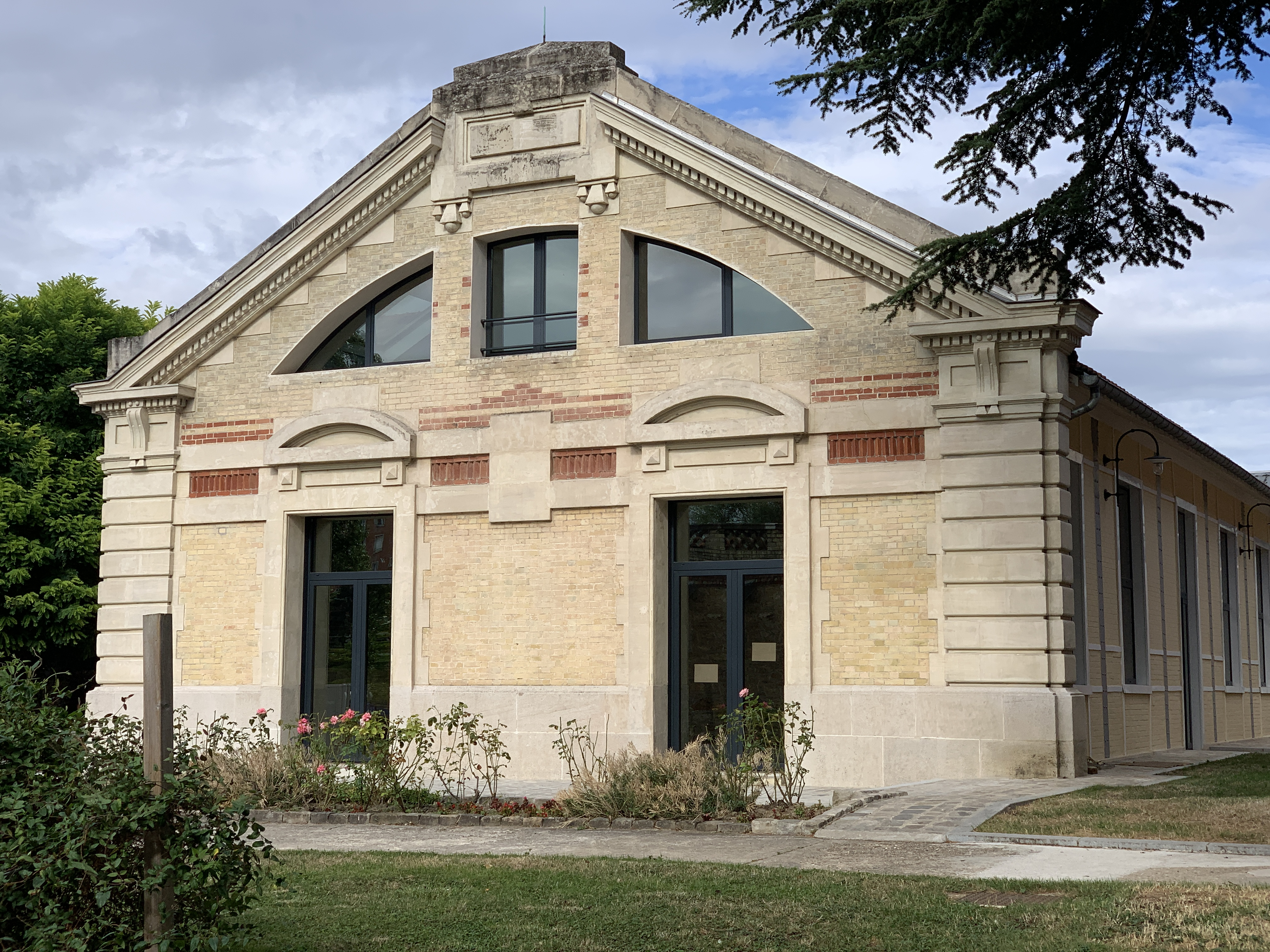
Former studio buildings

The Joinville Studios were a film studio in Paris which operated between 1910 and 1987. They were one of the leading French studios, with major companies such as Pathé and Gaumont making films there.

A second studio was added to the original in 1923. This was located less than a kilometre away, and together the two served as a major filmmaking hub. After the Second World War the studio was merged into the Franstudio network in 1947 along with other major Paris studios including the Saint-Maurice Studios and Francoeur Studios.

In the early 1930s, the American company Paramount Pictures took over the studios and made French-language versions of their hit films. In total, films were made in fourteen different languages as Joinville became a hub of such multi-language versions. While many were remakes of English-language hits, some were original stories. This practice declined as dubbing became more commonplace.

== Bibliography ==
- Bentley, Bernard. A Companion to Spanish Cinema. Boydell & Brewer 2008.
- Crisp, C.G. The Classic French Cinema, 1930-1960. Indiana University Press, 1993
- Williams, Alan Larson. Republic of Images: A History of French Filmmaking. Harvard University Press, 1992.
- Waldman, Harry. Paramount in Paris: 300 Films Produced at the Joinville Studios, 1930-1933, Scarecrow Press, 1998.
