= List of French films of 1943 =

A list of films produced in Occupied France in 1943.

== A–L ==
Title	Director	Cast	Genre	Notes
Adrien	Fernandel	Fernandel, Paulette Dubost, Jean Tissier	Comedy	
After the Storm	Pierre-Jean Ducis	René Dary, Jules Berry, Suzy Prim	Comedy drama	
Angels of the Streets	Robert Bresson	Renée Faure, Jany Holt, Mila Parély	Drama	
Arlette and Love	Robert Vernay	André Luguet, Josette Day, André Alerme	Comedy	
Captain Fracasse	Abel Gance	Fernand Gravey, Assia Noris, Alice Tissot	Historical	
Colonel Chabert	René Le Hénaff	Raimu, Marie Bell, Aimé Clariond	Historical	
Le Corbeau	Henri-Georges Clouzot	Pierre Fresnay, Ginette Leclerc, Micheline Francey	Mystery	
The Count of Monte Cristo	Robert Vernay	Pierre Richard-Willm, Michèle Alfa, Aimé Clariond	Historical	Co-production with Italy
A Dog's Life	Maurice Cammage	Fernandel, Josseline Gaël, Félicien Tramel	Comedy	
Domino	Roger Richebé	Fernand Gravey, Simone Renant, Aimé Clariond	Drama	
Don't Shout It from the Rooftops	Jacques Daniel-Norman	Fernandel, Robert Le Vigan, Meg Lemonnier	Comedy	
The Eternal Return	Jean Delannoy	Jean Marais, Madeleine Sologne, Junie Astor	Romance	Written by Jean Cocteau
The Exile's Song	André Hugon	Tino Rossi, Ginette Leclerc, Aimé Clariond	Drama	
Goodbye Leonard	Pierre Prévert	Charles Trenet, Pierre Brasseur, Jacqueline Pagnol	Comedy	
The Heart of a Nation	Julien Duvivier	Raimu, Michèle Morgan, Louis Jouvet	Drama	
The Honourable Catherine	Marcel L'Herbier, Jacques de Baroncelli	Edwige Feuillère, Raymond Rouleau, André Luguet	Comedy	
I Am with You	Henri Decoin	Yvonne Printemps, Pierre Fresnay, Bernard Blier	Comedy	
The Inevitable Monsieur Dubois	Pierre Billon	Annie Ducaux, André Luguet, Germaine Reuver	Comedy	
It Happened at the Inn	Jacques Becker	Fernand Ledoux, Robert Le Vigan, Blanchette Brunoy	Mystery	
Home Port	Jean Choux	Michèle Alfa, René Dary, Édouard Delmont	Comedy drama	
Jeannou	Léon Poirier	Michèle Alfa, Saturnin Fabre, Thomy Bourdelle	Comedy	
Love Around the Clock	Yvan Noé	Gaby Morlay, Fernandel, Meg Lemonnier	Comedy drama	
Love Story	Claude Autant-Lara	Odette Joyeux, Madeleine Robinson, Roger Pigaut	Romance	
The Lucky Star	Jean Boyer	Fernandel, Janine Darcey, René Génin	Comedy	
Lucrèce	Léo Joannon	Edwige Feuillère, Pierre Jourdan, Jean Tissier	Drama	

== M–Z ==
Title	Director	Cast	Genre	Notes
Mademoiselle Béatrice	Max de Vaucorbeil	Gaby Morlay, André Luguet, Louise Carletti	Comedy	
Madly in Love	Paul Mesnier	Elvire Popesco, Henri Garat, Micheline Francey	Comedy	
Mahlia the Mestiza	Walter Kapps	Käthe von Nagy, Jean Servais, Pierre Magnier	Drama	
La Main du diable	Maurice Tourneur	Pierre Fresnay, Josseline Gaël, Noël Roquevert	Horror	
Malaria	Jean Gourguet	Mireille Balin, Sessue Hayakawa, Jacques Dumesnil	Drama	
The Man from London	Henri Decoin	Fernand Ledoux, Suzy Prim, Jules Berry	Thriller	
The Man Who Sold His Soul	Jean-Paul Paulin	Michèle Alfa, André Luguet, Mona Goya	Drama	
The Man Without a Name	Léon Mathot	Jean Galland, André Alerme, Georges Rollin	Drama	
Marie-Martine	Albert Valentin	Renée Saint-Cyr, Jules Berry, Saturnin Fabre	Drama	
Mermoz	Louis Cuny	Robert Hugues-Lambert, Lucien Nat, Camille Bert	Drama	
The Midnight Sun	Bernard-Roland	Jules Berry, Josseline Gaël, Sessue Hayakawa	Thriller	
Mistral	Jacques Houssin	Roger Duchesne, Ginette Leclerc, Fernand Charpin	Comedy	
Monsieur des Lourdines	Pierre de Hérain	Raymond Rouleau, Mila Parély, Germaine Dermoz	Historical	
My Last Mistress	Sacha Guitry	Sacha Guitry, Aimé Clariond, Mona Goya	Drama	
My Love is Near You	Richard Pottier	Tino Rossi, Annie France	Comedy	
The Mysteries of Paris	Jacques de Baroncelli	Marcel Herrand, Yolande Laffon, Alexandre Rignault	Drama	
The Phantom Baron	Serge de Poligny	André Lefaur, Odette Joyeux, Jany Holt	Drama	
Picpus	Richard Pottier	Albert Préjean, Juliette Faber, Jean Tissier	Crime	
Pierre and Jean	André Cayatte	Renée Saint-Cyr, Noël Roquevert, Jacques Dumesnil	Drama	
The Secret of Madame Clapain	André Berthomieu	Raymond Rouleau, Line Noro, Michèle Alfa	Crime	
Secrets	Pierre Blanchar	Pierre Blanchar, Marie Déa, Jacques Dumesnil	Comedy drama	
Shop Girls of Paris	André Cayatte	Michel Simon, Albert Préjean, Blanchette Brunoy	Historical drama	
Shot in the Night	Robert Péguy	Henri Rollan, Jean Debucourt, Raymond Aimos	Crime drama	
The Stairs Without End	Georges Lacombe	Pierre Fresnay, Madeleine Renaud, Suzy Carrier	Drama	
Strange Inheritance	Louis Daquin	Assia Noris, Jules Berry, Gabrielle Dorziat	Mystery	Co-production with Italy
Summer Light	Jean Grémillon	Madeleine Renaud, Pierre Brasseur, Madeleine Robinson	Drama	
Two Timid Souls	Yves Allégret, Marc Allégret	Pierre Brasseur, Jacqueline Laurent, Gisèle Préville	Comedy	
Valley of Hell	Maurice Tourneur	Ginette Leclerc, Gabrielle Fontan	Drama romance	
Vautrin	Pierre Billon	Michel Simon, Madeleine Sologne, Georges Marchal	Historical	
Voyage Without Hope	Christian-Jaque	Simone Renant, Jean Marais, Paul Bernard	Drama	
The White Truck	Léo Joannon	Jules Berry, Blanchette Brunoy, François Périer	Comedy drama	
The White Waltz	Jean Stelli	Lise Delamare, André Alerme, Aimé Clariond	Drama	
White Wings	Robert Péguy	Gaby Morlay, Jacques Dumesnil, Marcelle Géniat	Drama	
The Wolf Farm	Richard Pottier	François Périer, Paul Meurisse, André Gabriello	Crime	
The Wolf of the Malveneurs	Guillaume Radot	Madeleine Sologne, Pierre Renoir, Gabrielle Dorziat	Mystery	
A Woman in the Night	Edmond T. Gréville	Viviane Romance, Georges Flamant, Claude Dauphin	Drama	

== See also ==
- 1943 in France
