= The Snow on the Footsteps =

The Snow on the Footsteps may refer to:

- The Snow on the Footsteps (1923 film), a French silent drama film
- The Snow on the Footsteps (1942 film), a French drama film
