= Turandot, Princess of China =

1935 film

- French film poster
- French: Turandot, princesse de Chine
- Directed by: Gerhard Lamprecht; Serge Véber
- Written by: Carlo Gozzi (play); Friedrich Schiller (play); Thea von Harbou; Serge Véber
- Produced by: Günther Stapenhorst; Erich von Neusser
- Starring: Käthe von Nagy; Pierre Blanchar; Marcel Dalio
- Cinematography: Fritz Arno Wagner
- Edited by: Arnfried Heyne
- Music by: Franz Doelle
- Production company: UFA
- Distributed by: ACE
- Release date: 14 February 1935
- Running time: 83 minutes
- Country: Germany
- Language: French

Turandot, Princess of China (French: Turandot, princesse de Chine) is a 1935 comedy film directed by Gerhard Lamprecht and Serge Véber and starring Käthe von Nagy, Pierre Blanchar and Marcel Dalio. It is the French language version of the German film Princess Turandot. Such multi-language versions were common during the first decade of sound.

The film's sets were designed by the art directors Robert Herlth and Walter Röhrig.

== Cast ==
- Käthe von Nagy as Turandot
- Pierre Blanchar as Kalaf, the bird-dealer
- Marcel Dalio as Hippolyte
- Sinoël as The Emperor
- José Noguéro as Prince of Samarkand
- Monette Dinay as Mian-Li
- Marfa d'Hervilly as The Empress
- Rognoni aas the fruit dealer
- André Berley as the judge
- Julien Carette
- Edouard Hamel
- Katia Lova
- Philippe Richard
