= The Imaginary Invalid (disambiguation) =

The Imaginary Invalid is a comédie-ballet by Molière.

The Imaginary Invalid may also refer to:

- The Imaginary Invalid (Jenkinson adaptation), a 1948 Australian stage play adapted by Creswick Jenkinson from the Molière play
- The Imaginary Invalid (1934 film), a French historical comedy film, an adaptation of the Molière play
- The Imaginary Invalid (1952 film), a West German comedy film, an adaptation of the Molière play
