= 600,000 Francs a Month =

600,000 Francs a Month may refer to:

- 600,000 Francs a Month (1926 film), a French silent comedy film
- 600,000 Francs a Month (1933 film), a French comedy film
