= Monsieur Sans-Gêne =

1935 film directed by Karl Anton

- Directed by: Karl Anton
- Written by: Emeric Pressburger; René Pujol
- Starring: Fernand Gravey; Josseline Gaël; Ginette Gaubert
- Cinematography: Theodore J. Pahle
- Music by: Ralph Erwin
- Production company: Aurora-Films
- Distributed by: Gallic Films
- Release date: 15 March 1935
- Running time: 95 minutes
- Country: France
- Language: French

Monsieur Sans-Gêne is a 1935 French romantic comedy film directed by Karl Anton and starring Fernand Gravey, Josseline Gaël and Ginette Gaubert. The following year it was remade as an American comedy One Rainy Afternoon, released by United Artists.

== Synopsis ==
A man creates a national scandal after he mistakenly kisses the wrong woman in a darkened cinema.

== Cast ==
- Fernand Gravey as Fernand Martin
- Josseline Gaël as Monique Perrochin
- Ginette Gaubert as Juliette Durand
- Armand Dranem as Le souffleur
- Thérèse Dorny as La féministe
- Jeanne Byrel as La gouvernante
- Charles Dechamps as Pierre Crémieux
- Jim Gérald as Monsieur Perrochin
- Nicolas Rimsky as Le musicien

== Bibliography ==
- Crisp, Colin. Genre, Myth and Convention in the French Cinema 1929-1939. Indiana University Press, 2002.
- Mazdon, Lucy. Encore Hollywood: Remaking French Cinema. British Film Institute, 2000.
