= Fraternité =

Fraternité may refer to:

- Fraternité (film), a 1954 French comedy TV film
- French frigate Fraternité, formerly the Aglaé

== See also ==
- Fraternity (disambiguation)
