= The Duraton Family =

1939 film

- Directed by: Christian Stengel
- Written by: Jean Granier; Noël-Noël; Jean-Jacques Vital; René Wheeler
- Produced by: Christian Stengel
- Starring: Noël-Noël; Jules Berry; Blanchette Brunoy
- Cinematography: André Bac; Joseph-Louis Mundwiller
- Edited by: Louis Chavance; Laura Sejourné
- Music by: Paul Misraki
- Production company: Société de Production du Film Famille Duraton
- Distributed by: Compagnie Générale Cinématographique
- Release date: 6 September 1939
- Running time: 85 minutes
- Country: France
- Language: French

The Duraton Family (French: La famille Duraton) is a 1939 French comedy film directed by Christian Stengel and starring Noël-Noël, Jules Berry and Blanchette Brunoy. It was shot at the Billancourt Studios in Paris. The film's sets were designed by the art director Pierre Linzbach. It is based on a popular radio show of the same name. The plot bears similarities to the 1943 American film True to Life. Another French film inspired by the show The Duratons was released in 1955.

== Synopsis ==
The car of Sammy Walter, an unscrupulous producer for the Paris Radio-Seine, breaks down in the countryside. He manages to find accommodation with the Martin family. He is so amused by their eccentric ways and conversations that he decides to start secretly broadcasting on air every evening, believing listeners will be fascinated by a real portrait of a village in Deep France. Although the show goes out the name The Duration Family, their true identity becomes obvious when indiscreet gossip about local affairs is broadcast.

== Cast ==
- Noël-Noël as Adrien Martin
- Jules Berry as Sammy Walter
- Blanchette Brunoy as Lisette Martin
- Julien Carette as Paradis
- André Certes as Georges Massard
- Marguerite Deval as La grand-mère
- Annie France as Nina
- Jean Granier as Le directeur de la radio
- Marcelle Praince as Madame Martin
- Jean Sinoël as Le grand-père
- Jane Sourza as Jane Sourza
- Marcel Vallée as Monsieur Massard
- Jean-Jacques Vital as Jean-Jacques Vital
- Alfred Adam as Le docteur
- Pierrette Michel as Zizi Martin
- Pierre Palau as Willy
- Pierre Viala as Jean-Jacques Martin

== Bibliography ==
- Bessy, Maurice & Chirat, Raymond. Histoire du cinéma français: 1935-1939. Pygmalion, 1986.
- Crisp, Colin. Genre, Myth and Convention in the French Cinema, 1929-1939. Indiana University Press, 2002.
- Powrie, Phil & Cadalanu, Marie . The French Film Musical. Bloomsbury Publishing, 2020.
- Rège, Philippe. Encyclopedia of French Film Directors, Volume 1. Scarecrow Press, 2009.
