= The Duchess of Langeais (1942 film) =

1942 film

- Directed by: Jacques de Baroncelli
- Written by: Jean Giraudoux; Honoré de Balzac (novel)
- Produced by: H.-A. Kusters
- Starring: Edwige Feuillère; Pierre Richard-Willm; Aimé Clariond
- Cinematography: Christian Matras
- Edited by: Yvonne Martin
- Music by: Francis Poulenc
- Production company: Films Orange Compaigne
- Distributed by: Védis Films
- Release date: 27 March 1942
- Running time: 99 minutes
- Country: France
- Language: French

The Duchess of Langeais (French: La Duchesse de Langeais) is a 1942 French historical drama film directed by Jacques de Baroncelli and starring Edwige Feuillère, Pierre Richard-Willm and Aimé Clariond. It is also known as Wicked Duchess. It is based on the 1834 novel of the same name by Honoré de Balzac. It was shot at the Buttes-Chaumont Studios in Paris. The film's sets were designed by the art director Serge Piménoff. Francis Poulenc composed the music.

== Cast ==
- Edwige Feuillère as Antoinette de Langeais
- Pierre Richard-Willm as Armand de Montriveau
- Aimé Clariond as Ronquerolles
- Lise Delamare as Madame de Serizy
- Charles Granval as Le vidame de Pamiers
- Irène Bonheur as Caroline
- Marthe Mellot as La mère supérieure
- Simone Renant as La vicomtesse de Fontaines
- Hélène Constant as Paméla
- Madeleine Pagès as Suzette
- Dorothée Luss as Madame de Lestorade
- Jacques Varennes as Le duc de Langeais
- Catherine Fonteney as La princesse de Blamont-Chauvry
- Georges Mauloy as Le duc de Grandieu
- Philippe Richard as Le portier
- Gaston Mauger as Louis XVIII
- Maurice Dorléac as Le baron de Maulincour
- Henri Richard as Le duc de Navareins
- Georges Grey as Marsay

== Bibliography ==
- Rège, Philippe. Encyclopedia of French Film Directors, Volume 1. Scarecrow Press, 2009.
