= La Bête Humaine (film) =

1938 film directed by Jean Renoir

- Theatrical release poster
- Directed by: Jean Renoir
- Screenplay by: Jean Renoir; Denise Leblond
- Based on: La Bête humaine 1890 novel by Émile Zola
- Produced by: Raymond Hakim; Robert Hakim
- Starring: Jean Gabin; Simone Simon; Fernand Ledoux; Blanchette Brunoy
- Cinematography: Curt Courant
- Edited by: Suzanne de Troeye; Marguerite Renoir
- Music by: Joseph Kosma
- Production company: Paris Film
- Distributed by: Lux Compagnie Cinématographique de France; Paris Films Location
- Release date: December 23, 1938 (France)
- Running time: 100 minutes
- Country: France
- Language: French

La Bête Humaine (English: The Human Beast and Judas Was a Woman) is a 1938 French crime drama film directed by Jean Renoir, with cinematography by Curt Courant. The picture features Jean Gabin and Simone Simon, and is loosely based on the 1890 novel La Bête humaine by Émile Zola.

La Bête Humaine is partially set "on a train that may be thought of as one of the main characters in the film." Although generally listed as a romantic drama, it is sometimes thought to foreshadow the film noir genre. Fritz Lang directed an adaptation of the same source material as Human Desire 16 years later in the U.S. for Columbia Pictures. The latter film falls more properly within the film noir genre.

== Plot summary ==
Lantier is a railway engine driver obsessively tied to his locomotive, in part because his work distracts him from recurring headaches and violent rages that happen when he is with a woman and become worse when he drinks. During a stop for repairs in Le Havre, Lantier goes to his aunt's nearby village. He tells her he no longer has the attacks of violence, but then has one when he meets Flore, an attractive young woman he knew as a little girl. The two walk and sit beside the railway, but as they embrace, his hands tighten on her neck, and he is stopped from strangling her only by the distracting roar of a passing train. Knowing of his condition, she forgives him.

Roubaud, the deputy stationmaster at Le Havre, is married to Séverine, who formerly worked for her wealthy godfather Grandmorin. Roubaud now accuses her of once having had an affair with Grandmorin, and she confirms that he took advantage of her. Roubaud demands that she be present as he takes his revenge. They arrange to be aboard the same train as Grandmorin; Roubaud and Séverine go to his compartment and Roubaud stabs the man to death. However, while in the corridor between compartments, they meet Lantier, who is a passenger on the same train. With Roubaud's encouragement, Séverine asks Lantier not to tell the police what he knows, and the murder is pinned on a habitual criminal, Cabouche.

Afterwards, Séverine and Roubaud are both haunted by the murder in different ways, and Séverine turns to Lantier for comfort. Meeting in secret during a rainstorm, their passion is suggested by an overflowing rain barrel as they begin an affair. Roubaud has lapsed into depression following the murder; Séverine tells Lantier that her husband will eventually kill her and suggests that Lantier strike first.

Lantier is unable to carry out an attack on Roubaud, but when Séverine at her home tells Lantier that she will leave Roubaud, he agrees to try again. Just then, the couple hear a noise and think that Roubaud is approaching. Lantier then has one of his seizures and kills Séverine. Returning to his locomotive for another run to Paris, he confesses to his fireman Pecqeaux. Although Pecqeaux is understanding of his actions, Lantier is unable to live with the grief. Out on the main line, he attacks Pecqeaux in a fit of despair, then leaps from the moving train to his death. After safely stopping the engine and walking back to Lantier's body, Pecqeaux remarks that Lantier now looks more peaceful than he had for a long time.

== Cast ==
- Jean Gabin as Jacques Lantier
- Simone Simon as Séverine Roubaud
- Fernand Ledoux as Roubaud
- Blanchette Brunoy as Flore
- Gérard Landry as Le fils Dauvergne
- Jenny Hélia as Philomène Sauvagnat
- Colette Régis as Victoire Pecqueux
- Claire Gérard as Une voyageuse
- Charlotte Clasis as Tante Phasie, la marraine de Lantier
- Jacques Berlioz as Grandmorin
- Tony Corteggiani as Dabadie, le chef de section
- André Tavernier as Le juge d'instruction Denizet
- Marcel Pérès as Un lampiste
- Jean Renoir as Cabuche
- Julien Carette as Pecqueux
- Jacques Roussel as Commissaire Cauche
- Jacques Becker as Un lampiste
- Guy Decomble as Le garde-barrière

== Production ==
Jean Gabin wanted to star in a film about locomotives and wrote a screenplay called Train d'Enfer, that was originally to be directed by Jean Grémillon. Dissatisfied with the script, Grémillon suggested an adaptation of La Bête humaine. After his success starring in Renoir's Grand Illusion (1937), Gabin preferred to work with Jean Renoir again, and hired him instead of Grémillon. Renoir eventually wrote the script over a period of eight to fifteen days. (Renoir said it took him twelve days in the introduction to the movie). After its completion, Renoir read the screenplay to Gabin's producer Robert Hakim, who asked for "trifling modifications".

Renoir confessed that at the time when he wrote the screenplay, he had not read Zola's novel in over 25 years: "While I was shooting, I kept modifying the scenario, bringing it closer to Zola ... the dialogue which I gave Simone Simon is almost entirely copied from Zola's text. Since I was working at top speed, I'd re-read a few pages of Zola every night, to make sure I wasn't overlooking anything."

Filming commenced on August 12, 1938, with exteriors on the Gare Saint-Lazare and at Le Havre. Interiors were shot at the Billancourt Studios in Paris. The film's sets were designed by the art director Eugène Lourié. Due to running time restrictions, Renoir had to omit several celebrated occurrences from the novel.

== Reception ==
=== Critical response ===
Frank Nugent, critic for The New York Times, gave La Bête Humaine a positive review even though he felt uncomfortable watching the film, writing:

It is hardly a pretty picture, dealing as it does with a man whose tainted blood subjects him to fits of homicidal mania, with a woman of warped childhood who shares her husband's guilty secret of murder... It is simply a story; a macabre, grim and oddly-fascinating story. Sitting here, a safe distance from it, we are not at all sure we entirely approve of it or of its telling. Its editing could have been smoother—which is another way of saying that Renoir jerks his camera, jumps a bit too quickly from scene to scene, doesn't always make clear why his people are behaving as they do. But sitting here is not quite the same as sitting in the theatre watching it. There we were conscious only of constant interest and absorption tinged with horror and an uncomfortable sense of dread. And deep down, of course, ungrudged admiration for Renoir's ability to seduce us into such a mood, for the performances which preserved it.

=== Accolades ===
Nominations

- Venice Film Festival: Mussolini Cup, Best Film, Jean Renoir; 1939.
