= Heinz Rehfuss =

Swiss-born bass-baritone

Heinz Julius Rehfuss (25 May 1917 – 27 June 1988) was a Swiss operatic bass-baritone, who later became an American citizen. He was particularly associated with the title roles in Don Giovanni and Boris Godunov, and Golaud in Pelléas et Mélisande.

== Life ==
Born in Frankfurt, he was the son of Carl Rehfuss (1885-1946), a baritone, concertist and teacher, and his wife, alto Florentine Rehfuss-Peichert. He spent his youth in Neuchâtel, Switzerland, where his father was teaching at the Conservatory, and was entirely trained by him. He made his debut in 1938 at the Städtebundtheater in Biel-Solothurn, as a choral singer and stage designer, and sang as a soloist in Lucerne during the 1938-39 season.

He appeared at the Zurich Opera from 1940 until 1952, where he undertook some 80 roles. From 1952, he made frequent guest appearances in opera houses all over Europe, including La Scala in Milan, Italy, the Opéra National de Paris, the Vienna State Opera, the Liceo in Barcelona, the Munich State Opera, the Monte Carlo Opera, the Maggio Musicale Fiorentino, La Fenice in Venice, the Edinburgh Festival, etc. He went on concert tours in America, Asia, and Africa. With his smooth and mellifluous voice, he was both a skilled lieder and oratorio singer. Not only has Rehfuss both performed and adapted contemporary works by composers such as Stravinsky, Milhaud, Britten, but he is known to have been uniquely adept at adapting the works of Johann Sebastian Bach.

Rehfuss took part in the premiere of Nono's opera Intolleranza 1960, in 1961.

In later years, Rehfuss taught at the State University of New York in Buffalo, New York, and was a visiting teacher at the Eastman School of Music in Rochester, New York, and at the Conservatoire de musique du Québec à Montréal. He died in Buffalo, New York.

His sister was the Swiss singer Eva Rehfuss (1923-2008), who was married to the composer Roger Roger.

== Selected recordings ==
- Debussy, Pelléas et Mélisande. Suzanne Danco, Pierre Mollet, Heinz Rehfuss, Chœur et Orchestre de la Suisse Romande, Ernest Ansermet - (Decca, 1952)
- Gounod, Faust. Léopold Simoneau, Pierrette Alarie, Heinz Rehfuss, Vienna Opera Chorus and Vienna Festival Orchestra, Gianfranco Rivoli - (VAI, 1963)
- Gounod, Roméo et Juliette. Raoul Jobin, Janine Micheau, Heinz Rehfuss, Chœur et Orchestre de l'Opéra de Paris, Alberto Erede - (Decca, 1953)
- Mahler, Des Knaben Wunderhorn. Maureen Forrester, Heinz Rehfuss, Vienna Festival Orchestra, Felix Prohaska - (Vanguard, 1963)

== Videography ==
- Mozart, Le nozze di Figaro. Heinz Rehfuss, Marcella Pobbé, Rosanna Carteri, Nicola Rossi-Lemeni, Dora Gatta, Orchestra Sinfonica e Coro della RAI di Milano, Nino Sanzogno - (Hardy Classics, 1956)

== Sources ==
- Grove Music Online, Jürg Stenzl, August 2008.
