= The Winner's Circle (1950 film) =

- Directed by: René Wheeler
- Written by: René Wheeler
- Starring: Michèle Alfa; Julien Carette; Paul Frankeur
- Cinematography: Henri Franchi
- Music by: René Cloërec
- Production company: Cady Films
- Distributed by: Armor Films
- Release date: 3 August 1950
- Running time: 87 minutes
- Country: France
- Language: French

The Winner's Circle (French: Premières armes) is a 1950 French drama film directed by René Wheeler and starring Michèle Alfa, Julien Carette and Paul Frankeur.

The film takes place in a stable for aspiring young jockeys.

== Cast ==
- Michèle Alfa as Yvonne
- Julien Carette as Simon
- Guy Decomble as Émile
- Paul Frankeur as Victor
- Serge Grave as Michel
- Henri Poupon as Le père Lelarge
- Roger Rafal as Barrymore
- Santa Relli as Lucienne
- Jean Cordier as René
- Palmyre Levasseur as La concierge
- Suzanne Maury as La duchesse
- Albert Plantier as Josito
- Serge Soltani as Bobo

== Bibliography ==
- Crisp, C.G. The Classic French Cinema, 1930-1960. Indiana University Press, 1993.
