= Ginette Gaubert =

French actress

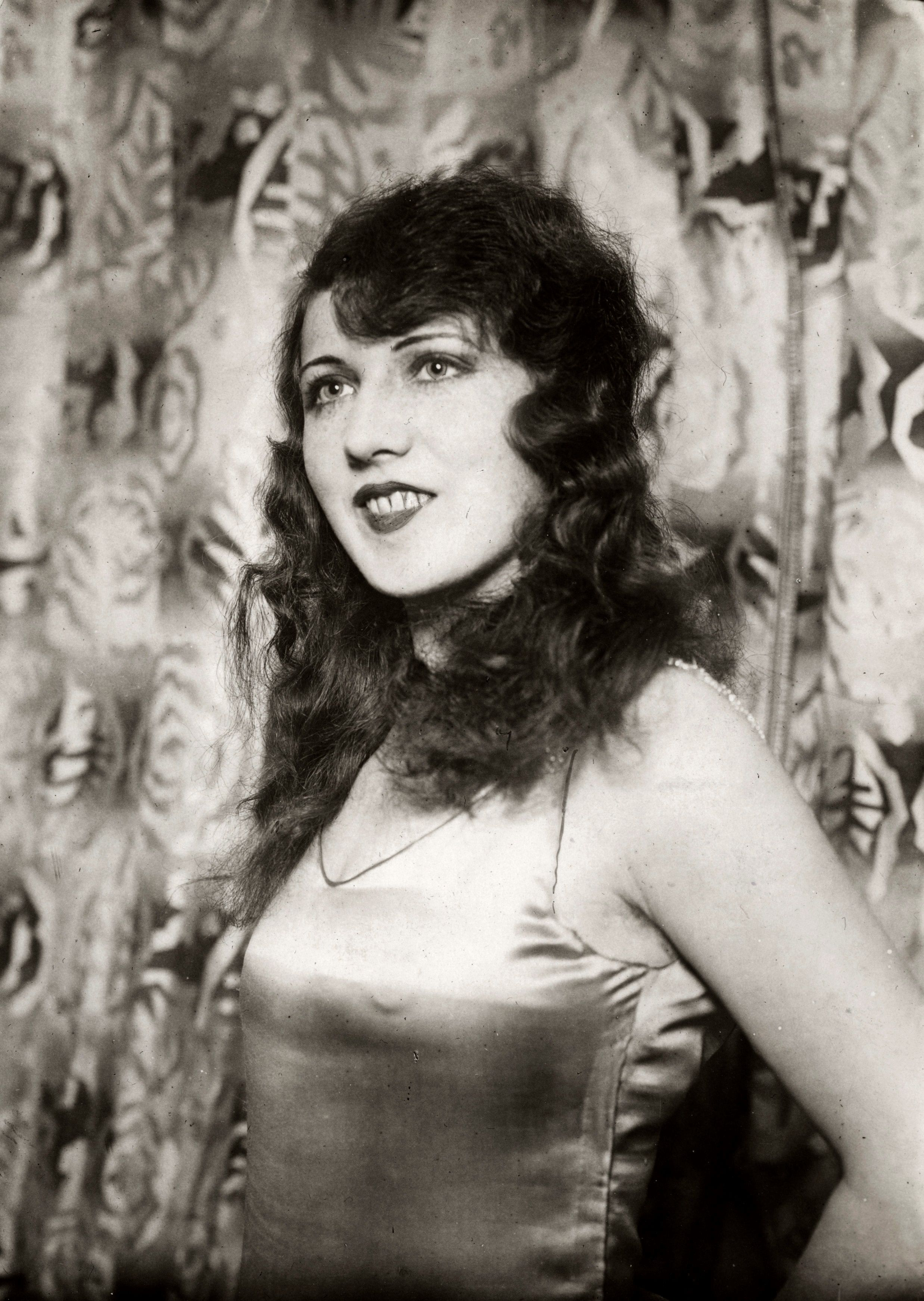
- Born: 20 February 1904; Villeurbanne, France
- Died: 23 January 1987 (aged 82); Nice, France
- Occupation: Actress
- Years active: 1930-1947 (film)

Ginette Gaubert (1904–1987) was a French model and film actress. She was a competitor in the 1930 Miss France competition. As an actress she mainly in supporting roles during the 1930s.

== Selected filmography ==
- Our Masters, the Servants (1930)
- Love and Luck (1932)
- Sailor's Song (1932)
- To the Polls, Citizens (1932)
- Nu comme un ver (1933)
- The Testament of Dr. Mabuse (1933)
- Le coq du régiment (1933)
- The Imaginary Invalid (1934)
- Last Hour (1934)
- Chansons de Paris (1934)
- Monsieur Sans-Gêne (1935)
- Juanita (1935)
- Carnival in Flanders (1935)
- Bach the Detective (1936)
- L'enfant du Danube (1936)
- La peau d'un autre (1937)
- L'escadrille de la chance (1938)
- Rasputin (1938)
- Entente cordiale (1939)
- Monsieur Vincent (1947)

== Bibliography ==
- Goble, Alan. The Complete Index to Literary Sources in Film. Walter de Gruyter, 1999.
- Kalat, David. The Strange Case of Dr. Mabuse: A Study of the Twelve Films and Five Novels. McFarland, 2005.
