= The Snow on the Footsteps (1923 film) =

1923 film

- Directed by: Henri Étiévant
- Written by: Robert Péguy
- Based on: The Snow on the Footsteps by Henry Bordeaux
- Starring: Victor Francen; Germaine Fontanes; Simone Guy
- Production company: Films A. Legrand
- Distributed by: Etablissements E. Giraud
- Release date: 1923
- Country: France
- Languages: Silent; French intertitles

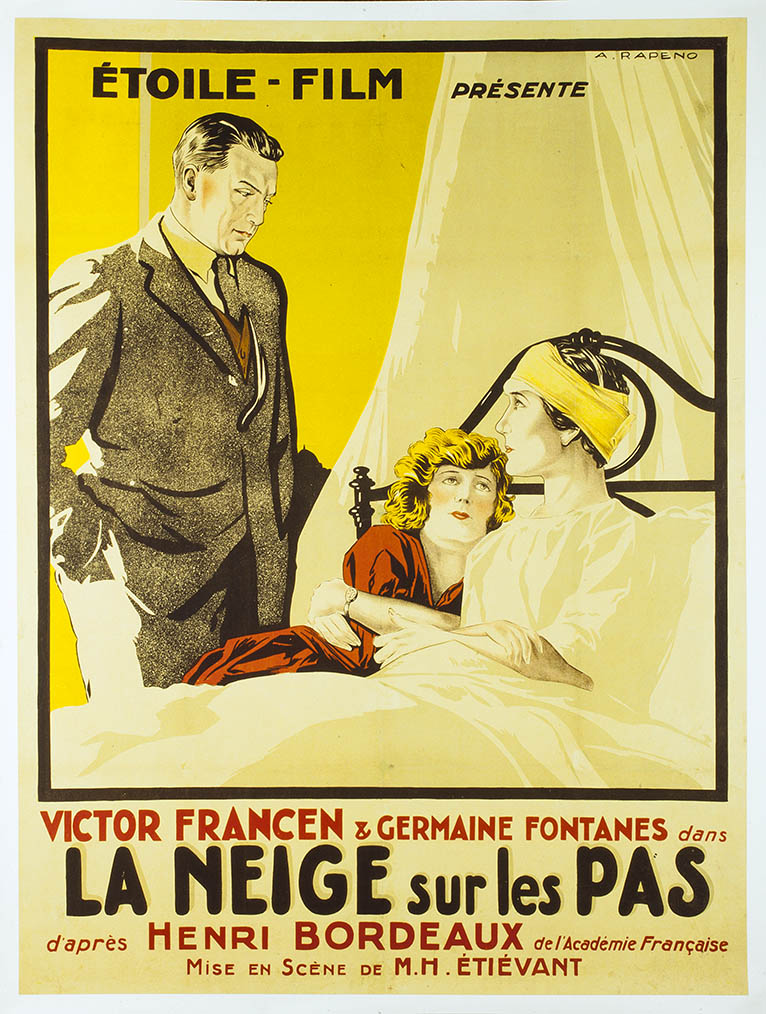
French movie poster for The Snow on the Footsteps.

The Snow on the Footsteps (French: La neige sur les pas) is a 1923 French silent drama film directed by Henri Étiévant and starring Victor Francen, Germaine Fontanes and Simone Guy. It is based on the 1911 novel of the same title by Henry Bordeaux, later adapted into a 1942 sound film.

== Cast ==
- Victor Francen as Marc Romenay
- Germaine Fontanes as Thérèse
- Simone Guy as La petite Juliette
- Monsieur Borin as André Norans
- Marie-Ange Fériel as Madame Romenay
- Madame Caillard-Dubuisson as La gouvernante
- R.P. Sounier as Le révérand père Cornaz
- Alfred Pellouchoud as Chanoine Pellouchoud

== Bibliography ==
- Goble, Alan. The Complete Index to Literary Sources in Film. Walter de Gruyter, 1999.
- Oscherwitz, Dayna & Higgins, MaryEllen. The A to Z of French Cinema. Scarecrow Press, 2009.
- Rège, Philippe. Encyclopedia of French Film Directors, Volume 1. Scarecrow Press, 2009.
