= L'Homme qui vendit son âme au diable =

1920 film

- Directed by: Pierre Caron
- Written by: Pierre Veber (novel)
- Cinematography: Andre A. Dantan
- Release date: 1921
- Running time: unknown
- Country: France
- Language: Silent film

L'Homme qui vendit son âme au diable (The Man Who Sold His Soul to the Devil) is a 1921 French silent film comedy directed by Pierre Caron. The plot was similar to Faust and The Student of Prague, about a man who makes a diabolical deal with the Devil.

The film was made in 1920, but only released in France in 1921. For some reason, it was not shown in the US until 1926, where it was released as The Man Who Sold His Soul to the Devil. It was later remade in France in 1943.

== Plot ==
A wealthy banker becomes depressed over financial matters and decides to commit suicide. Mephistopheles appears to him just as he is about to end his life, and makes a sinister bargain with him to buy his soul. After the deal is done, the banker meets a beautiful young lady and falls in love, no longer desiring to die. Fortunately the woman's love for him is so strong, she is able to drive the Devil away and free him from his pact.

== Cast ==
- Charles Dullin
- Jean-David Évremond
- Yvonne Fursey
- Gladys Rolland
