= Lights of Paris =

1938 film

- Directed by: Richard Pottier
- Written by: Robert Liebmann; René Pujol
- Produced by: Robert Hakim
- Starring: Tino Rossi; Michèle Alfa; Raymond Cordy
- Cinematography: Curt Courant; Claude Renoir
- Edited by: Marguerite Beaugé
- Music by: Henry Himmel; Moïse Simons; Maurice Yvain
- Production company: Paris Film Productions
- Distributed by: Paris Film Productions
- Release date: 5 October 1938
- Running time: 95 minutes
- Country: France
- Language: French

Lights of Paris (French: Lumières de Paris) is a 1938 French musical comedy film directed by Richard Pottier and starring Tino Rossi, Michèle Alfa and Raymond Cordy. It was shot at Pathé's Joinville Studios in Paris. The film's sets were designed by the art director Andrej Andrejew.

== Synopsis ==
A celebrated singer in Paris meets a young woman and courts her by pretending to be a driving instructor.

== Cast ==
- Tino Rossi as Carlo Ferrari
- Michèle Alfa as Renée
- Raymond Cordy as Toto
- Marie Bizet as Yvonne
- Georges Flateau as Joe Parker
- Félix Oudart as Le directeur de casino
- Conchita Montenegro as Pénélopeia - la danseuse
- Moïse Simons as Pianiste
- Fred Pasquali as Beaurivage
- Guy Sloux as Le manager
- Julien Carette as Le vendeur de postes
- Doumel as Le manager
- Raymond Bussières
- Irène Corday
- Claire Gérard
- Liliane Lesaffre
- Franck Maurice
- Émile Riandreys

== Bibliography ==
- Rège, Philippe . Encyclopedia of French Film Directors, Volume 1. Scarecrow Press, 2009.
