= Cécile Didier =

French actress (1888–1975)

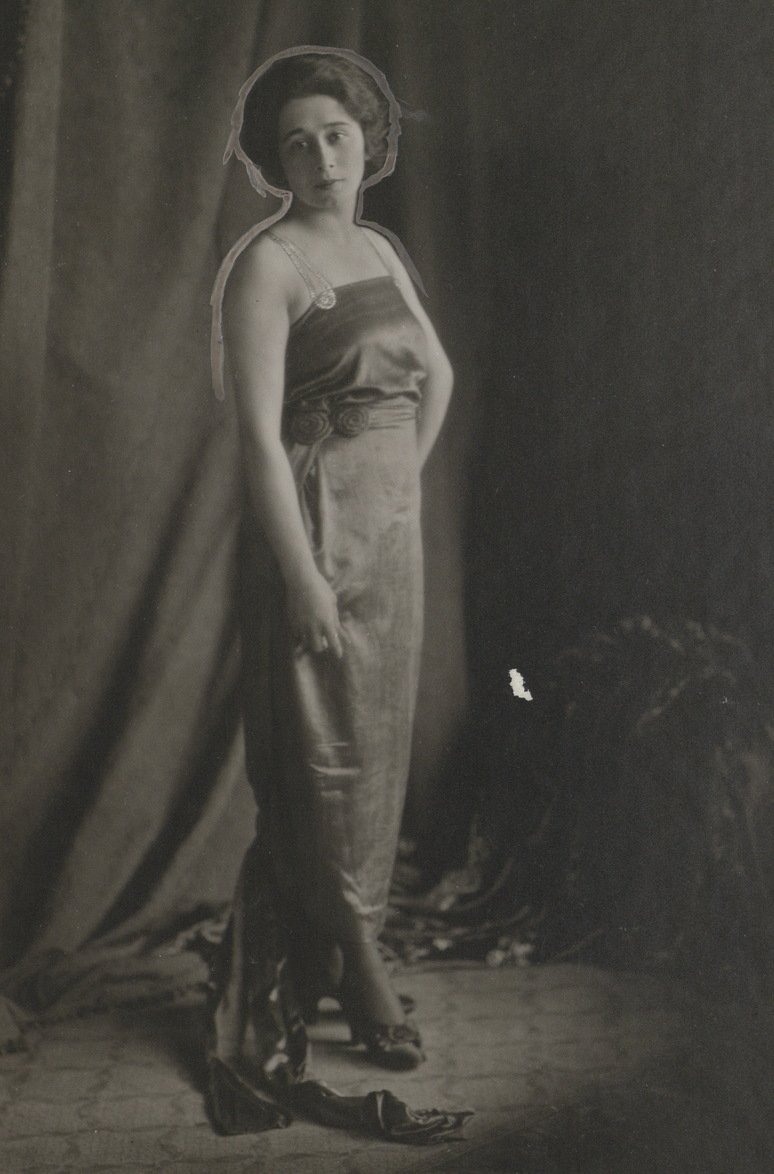
- Born: Carmen Andrée Deschamps; 19 January 1888; Château-du-Loir, Sarthe, Pays de la Loire, France
- Died: 20 July 1975 (aged 87); Montoire-sur-le-Loir, Loir-et-Cher, France
- Occupation: Actress
- Years active: 1910–1955 (film)

Cécile Didier (1888–1975) was a French stage and film actress.

== Selected filmography ==
- Sister of Mercy (1929)
- His Other Love (1934)
- Rasputin (1938)
- Hopes (1941)
- The Secret of Madame Clapain (1943)
- Home Port (1943)
- Man About Town (1947)
- Return to Life (1949)
- Justice Is Done (1950)
- Casimir (1950)
- The Night Is My Kingdom (1951)
- The Drunkard (1953)
- Their Last Night (1953)
- Rasputin (1954)
- Black Dossier (1955)

== Bibliography ==
- Robert Hamilton Ball. Shakespeare on Silent Film: A Strange Eventful History. Routledge, 2013.
