= Melody for You =

1942 film

- Directed by: Willy Rozier
- Written by: Willy Rozier; Pierre Véry
- Produced by: Willy Rozier
- Starring: René Dary; Katia Lova; Gisèle Préville
- Cinematography: Marcel Franchi
- Music by: Raoul Moretti
- Production company: Sport-Films
- Distributed by: Les Films de Koster
- Release date: 11 November 1942
- Running time: 87 minutes
- Country: France
- Language: French

Melody for You (French: Mélodie pour toi) is a 1942 French comedy film directed by Willy Rozier and starring René Dary, Katia Lova and Gisèle Préville. The film's sets were designed by the art directors Auguste Capelier and Georges Wakhévitch.

== Synopsis ==
René Sartène, a celebrated singer performs on stage with Irène Daniel. However, when René meets and falls in love with the attractive Marie their developing romance faces attempts to thwart it by the Marie's brother and the jealous Irène.

== Cast ==
- René Dary as René Sartène
- Katia Lova as Marie
- Gisèle Préville as Irène Daniel
- Pierre Stéphen as Ferdiand
- Lucien Callamand as Monfort
- Jean-François Martial as Le père Louis
- Milly Mathis as Maman Ninette
- Georges Péclet as Harris
- Pierre Boissin as Jacques

== Bibliography ==
- Bessy, Maurice & Chirat, Raymond. Histoire du cinéma français: encyclopédie des films, 1940–1950. Pygmalion, 1986
- Rège, Philippe. Encyclopedia of French Film Directors, Volume 1. Scarecrow Press, 2009.
