= Nane Germon =

French actress (1909–2001)

- Born: 10 June 1909; Paris, France
- Died: 6 March 2001 (aged 91); Asnières-sur-Seine, Hauts-de-Seine, France
- Other name: Germaine Hélène Nannon
- Occupation: Actress
- Years active: 1932–1996 (TV & film)

Nane Germon (1909–2001) was a French television and film actress.

== Selected filmography ==
- Coup de feu à l'aube (1932)
- A Weak Woman (1933)
- Le rayon des amours (1933) - Nicole
- Les aventures du roi Pausole (1933) - Nicole
- Court Waltzes (1933)
- Les aventures du roi Pausole (1933) - Nicole
- Le grillon du foyer (1933)
- Le bien-aimé Lanouille (1933)
- J'ai une idée (1934) - Norah
- The Barber of Seville (1934) - Fanchette
- The Imaginary Invalid (1934) - Toinette
- Pension Mimosas (1935) - La soubrette (uncredited)
- Marchand d'amour (1935)
- Juanita (1935) - Elaine Georgesco
- Madame Angot's Daughter (1935) - Hersilie
- Divine (1935) - Zaza
- Merchant of Love (1935) - Denise
- Mayerling (1936) - Anna Vetsera
- Taras Bulba (1936) - Zelma
- Le train d'amour (1936)
- Forty Little Mothers (1936) - Simone
- Notre-Dame d'amour (1936) - Zanette
- Hercule (1938) - Miette
- Bar du sud (1938) - Gisèle
- The Girls of the Rhône (1938)
- Ma soeur de lait (1938) - Isabelle
- Final Accord (1938) - Marie Poupard
- Girls in Distress (1939) - Ernestine
- Remorques (1941) - Renée Tanguy
- At Your Command, Madame (1942) - Léa
- Shot in the Night (1943) - Pauline
- Vautrin (1943) - Madame Camusot
- Beauty and the Beast (1946) - Adélaïde
- Clockface Café (1947) - Jeanne
- Return to Life (1949) - Henriette (segment 1 : "Le retour de tante Emma")
- Le crime des justes (1950) - Madame Combaroux
- Justice Is Done (1950) - Marie Malingré
- The Red Inn (1951) - Elisa
- The Lottery of Happiness (1953)
- Madame du Barry (1954) - Mlle du Barry
- People of No Importance (1956) - Mme Cussac
- Meeting in Paris (1956) - (uncredited)
- Irresistible Catherine (1957) - Mme Martin
- La bête à l'affût (1959) - Un dame au restaurant
- Le travail c'est la liberté (1959) - La mère d'Odette
- The Long Absence (1961) - Simone
- The Seven Deadly Sins (1962) - La dame au café (segment "Colère, La")
- Carillons sans joie (1962) - La mère de Léa
- La belle vie (1963) - L'amie riche
- Life Upside Down (1964) - La mère
- L'or du duc (1965)
- Le Chant du monde (1965) - Junie
- The Thief of Paris (1967) - Mme Voisin
- I Killed Rasputin (1967) - A follower of Rasputin
- Le 13ème caprice (1967)
- Les Biches (1968) - Violetta
- Sweet Deception (1972) - La sage-femme
- Monsieur Balboss (1975)
- Body of My Enemy (1976) - Mme Kelfer (uncredited)
- Diva (1981) - La vieille dame
- La femme ivoire (1984) - Mme Perrein
- Corentin, ou Les infortunes conjugales (1988) - La paysanne
- My Life Is Hell (1991) - La dame âgée église
- Pourquoi maman est dans mon lit? (1994)
- The City of Lost Children (1995) - Miette, Age 82

== Bibliography ==
- Goble, Alan. The Complete Index to Literary Sources in Film. Walter de Gruyter, 1999.
