= The Rebel (1938 film) =

1938 film

- Directed by: Léon Mathot
- Written by: Henri-Georges Clouzot
- Based on: The Rebel by Maurice Larrouy
- Produced by: Raymond Borderie; Bernard Natan
- Starring: René Dary; Pierre Renoir; Katia Lova
- Cinematography: Maurice Barry; Christian Gaveau; René Gaveau; Charles Suin
- Edited by: Aleksandr Uralsky
- Music by: Wal-Berg
- Production company: Compagnie Industrielle et Commerciale Cinématographique
- Distributed by: Etoile Film
- Release date: 28 October 1938
- Running time: 105 minutes
- Country: France
- Language: French

The Rebel (French: Le révolté) is a 1938 French drama film directed by Léon Mathot and starring René Dary, Pierre Renoir and Katia Lova. It was based on the 1924 novel of the same title by Maurice Larrouy. The film's sets were designed by the art director Robert Gys.

== Synopsis ==
A young, hot-heated recruit joins the French Navy in a fit of bravado. A natural rebel, he is a troublemaker until the patience of his captain and the love of a young woman allow his natural talents as a sailor to flourish.

== Cast ==
- René Dary as Pimaï
- Pierre Renoir as Capitaine Yorritz
- Katia Lova as Marie-Luce
- Aimé Clariond as Commandant Derive
- Marcelle Géniat as La grand-mère
- Fernand Charpin as Le père de Pimaï
- Jean Témerson as Blotaque
- Lucien Dalsace as Courguin - le second
- Pierre Labry as Le quartier-maître
- Marcel Lupovici as Un truand
- Roger Legris as Gauthier
- Andrews Engelmann as Un truand
- Henri Poupon as Le père du blessé
- Georges Paulais as Plantibar, le second
- Ole Cooper as Jeff
- Jean Buquet as Le petit Jacques

== Bibliography ==
- Bessy, Maurice & Chirat, Raymond. Histoire du cinéma français: encyclopédie des films, Volume 2. Pygmalion, 1986.
- Crisp, Colin. Genre, Myth and Convention in the French Cinema, 1929-1939. Indiana University Press, 2002.
- Rège, Philippe. Encyclopedia of French Film Directors, Volume 1. Scarecrow Press, 2009.
