= Last Hour (1934 film) =

1934 film

- Directed by: Jean Bernard-Derosne
- Written by: Jean Bernard-Derosne; Henri Duvernois
- Produced by: Léon Beytout
- Starring: Line Noro; Jean Servais; Ginette Gaubert
- Cinematography: Jacques Montéran; Roger Montéran
- Music by: Jean Tranchant
- Production company: Société Nouvelle de Cinématographie
- Distributed by: Radio Cinéma
- Release date: 1934
- Running time: 70 minutes
- Country: France
- Language: French

Last Hour (French: Dernière heure) is a 1934 French drama film directed by Jean Bernard-Derosne and starring Line Noro, Jean Servais and Ginette Gaubert.

== Synopsis ==
To escape from her brutal, tyrannical husband Madeleine kills him and flees with her young lover who is ignorant of the crime. They live together in happiness for a few days, but she knows that the last hour of her freedom will soon arrive.

== Cast ==
- Line Noro as Madeleine Chevrier
- Jean Servais as Jean Benoit
- Ginette Gaubert as Germaine
- Maurice Rémy as Henri
- Germaine Reuver as La laitière
- Paul Menant as L'ouvrier
- Georges Paulais as Chevrier
- Pedro Elviro as Le garçon de café
- Marcelle Sarret as La patronne du café
- Maurice Genevoix as Le groom
- Gaston Jacquet as Le commissaire
- G.A. Martin as Le facteur
- Jean Sinoël as Le veilleur

== Bibliography ==
- Bessy, Maurice & Chirat, Raymond. Histoire du cinéma français: 1935-1939. Pygmalion, 1986.
- Crisp, Colin. Genre, Myth and Convention in the French Cinema, 1929-1939. Indiana University Press, 2002.
- Rège, Philippe. Encyclopedia of French Film Directors, Volume 1. Scarecrow Press, 2009.
