= Summer storm =

Summer storm may refer to:

- Summer Storm (1944 film), an American film
- Summer Storm (1949 film), a French film
- Summer Storm (2004 film), a German film
