= Robert and Raymond Hakim =

Egyptian-born brothers and film producers

- Other names: Robert Hakim Raymond Hakim
- Citizenship: Egypt
- Occupation: Film producer
- Relatives: André Hakim (brother)

Robert Hakim (19 December 1907 – 9 February 1992) and Raymond Hakim (23 August 1909 – 14 August 1980) were Egyptian-born brothers who usually worked in collaboration as film producers in France and other European countries. Their brother André Hakim was also a film producer.

== Film production ==
Initially working for the American company Paramount, they formed the company Paris-Film Production in 1934. They financed Julien Duvivier's Pépé le Moko (1937), Jean Renoir's La Bête Humaine (1938) and Marcel Carné's Le Jour se lève (1939), all starring Jean Gabin. The brothers lived in the United States during World War II.

After the war they worked on several American films, including Renoir's The Southerner (1945) and The Long Night (1947), a remake of Le Jour se lève with Henry Fonda.

In 1950, they returned to France and embarked on producing films aimed at an international audience. Casque d'or (1953) effectively launched the career of Simone Signoret and Plein Soleil (1960) did the same for Alain Delon. Notre Dame de Paris (1956) with Anthony Quinn as Quasimodo and Gina Lollobrigida as Esmeralda was internationally successful, but not critically well received.

In the 1960s, they made two films with a nouvelle vague director, Claude Chabrol, À double tour (Web of Passion, 1959) and Les Bonnes Femmes (1960), but also worked with older directors, like Luis Buñuel on Belle de jour (1967). On other occasions, they worked with someone relatively new to international audiences, such as Michelangelo Antonioni on L'Eclisse (1962). They also worked with Roger Vadim on a remake of La Ronde (1964), which starred Vadim's then wife, Jane Fonda.

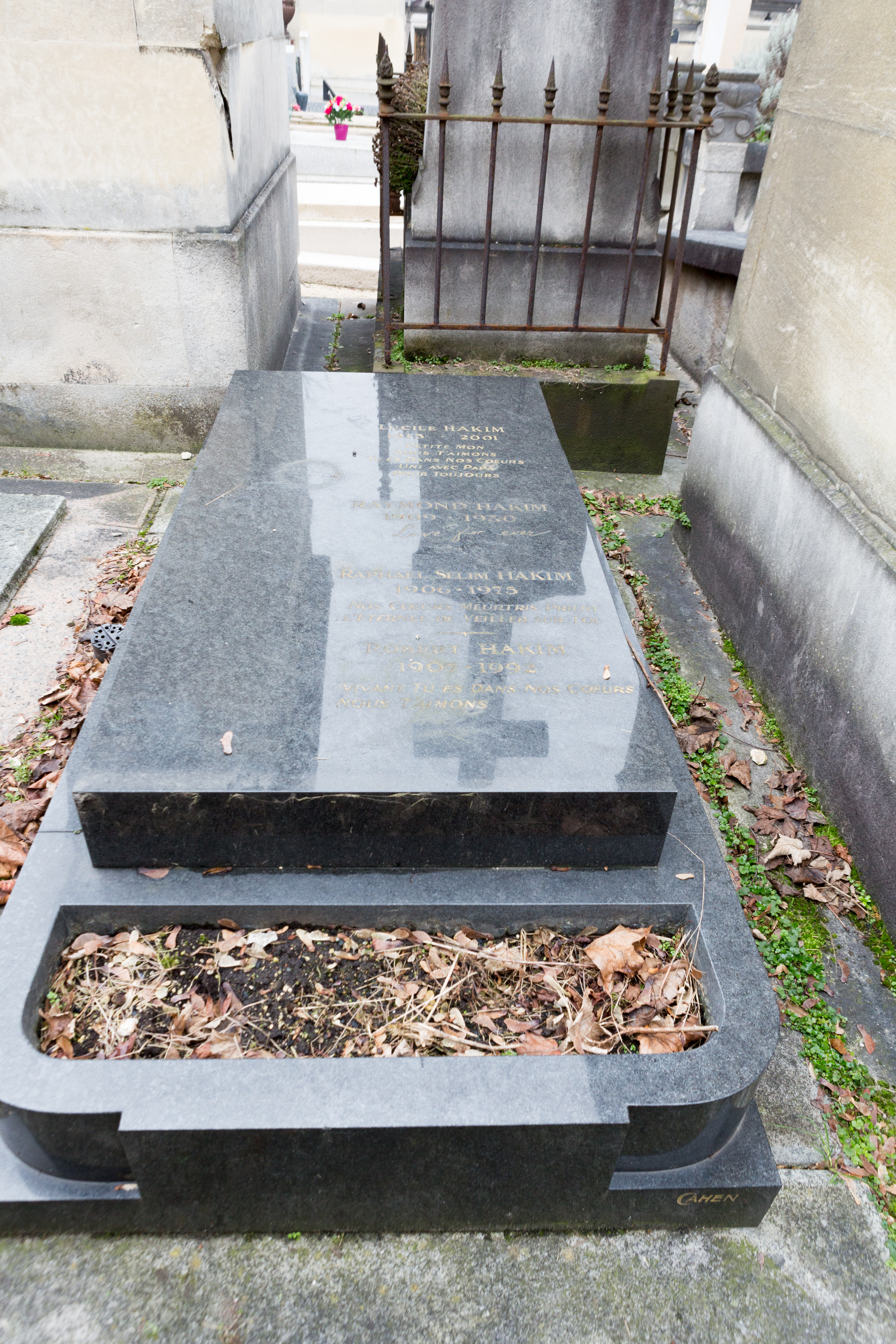
The tomb of Robert and Raymond in Père-Lachaise Cemetery.

The Hakims have a mixed reputation; American director Joseph Losey had an especially fraught relationship with them while making Eva (1962). In post-production, Losey and his team found the film had been recut during the weekend without their consultation; Losey and Robert Hakim almost came to blows. Michel Legrand was commissioned for the score without consultation too, but like actor Jeanne Moreau, was not paid a fee.

== Selected filmography ==
- The Kiss of Fire (1937)
- Marthe Richard (1937)
- Lights of Paris (1938)

== See also ==
Academy 1-2-3, 165 Oxford Street, London, managed by Eric Hakim
