= The Snow on the Footsteps (1942 film) =

1942 film

- Directed by: André Berthomieu
- Written by: André Berthomieu; Bernard Zimmer
- Based on: The Snow on the Footsteps by Henry Bordeaux
- Produced by: Albert Eyguesier; André Mingardon; André Paulvé
- Starring: Pierre Blanchar; Michèle Alfa; Georges Lannes
- Cinematography: Georges Benoît
- Edited by: Pierre Caillet; Henri Taverna
- Music by: Georges Derveaux
- Production company: Société de Production et de Doublage de Films
- Distributed by: Éclair-Journal
- Release date: 15 January 1942
- Running time: 91 minutes
- Country: France
- Language: French

The Snow on the Footsteps (French: La neige sur les pas) is a 1942 French drama film directed by André Berthomieu and starring Pierre Blanchar, Michèle Alfa and Georges Lannes. It was based on the 1911 novel of the same title by Henry Bordeaux. The film's sets were designed by the art director Robert Giordani. The novel had previously been adapted into the 1923 silent film The Snow on the Footsteps.

== Cast ==
- Pierre Blanchar as Marc Romanay
- Michèle Alfa as Thérèse Romanay
- Georges Lannes as André Norans
- Josseline Gaël as Simone Norans
- Line Noro as La gouvernante
- Pauline Carton as La directrice de la pension de famille
- Marcelle Praince as Madame Romanay mère
- Gaston Jacquet as Monastier
- Jean Toulout as Le père prieur
- Roberte Arnaud as Juliette

== Bibliography ==
- Goble, Alan. The Complete Index to Literary Sources in Film. Walter de Gruyter, 1999.
- Griffiths, Kate & Watts, Andrew. The History of French Literature on Film. Bloomsbury Publishing USA, 2020.
- Oscherwitz, Dayna & Higgins, MaryEllen. The A to Z of French Cinema. Scarecrow Press, 2009.
- Rège, Philippe. Encyclopedia of French Film Directors, Volume 1. Scarecrow Press, 2009.
