= Roger Roger (composer) =

French composer

Roger Roger (5 August 1911 – 12 June 1995) was a French composer of light orchestral music and film scores, as well as a conductor and bandleader. His aliases included Eric Swan and Cecil Leuter, the last being a pseudonym he used for his electronic music productions, of which he was somewhat of a pioneer. He is best known for his intricately composed and arranged orchestral contributions to commercial production music during the 1950s and 1960s, many of which have more recently achieved wider recognition. He helped revive the musical exotica genre with his album Jungle Obsession in 1971.

== Career ==
Roger Roger was born in Rouen, Normandy. His father Edmond Roger was a conductor at the Paris Opera and a friend of Claude Debussy, who is said to have named his son Roger "to satisfy a personal whim". He was taught in the classical tradition, influenced especially by Ravel, but he also discovered American popular song, analysing the compositions and arrangements of George Gershwin, Jerome Kern, Cole Porter and Irving Berlin.

Roger Roger began conducting at the age of 18 in music halls and quickly moved into the world of broadcast music. By the late 1930s, he was composing for French feature films and documentaries. Film credits include Fou d'amour (1943), Le camion blanc (1943), L'ange de la nuit (1944) and L'atomique Monsieur Placido (1950). He orchestrated the pantomime sections in Marcel Carné's acclaimed film Les Enfants du Paradis in 1945.

After the war, he came to the attention of the London publishing house Chappell & Co, which signed him up as part of its drive to expand the Chappell Recorded Music Library, formed in 1941. Mostly through the library system (rather than from specially commissioned scores), Roger Roger's music is said to have been used for over 50 radio productions, nearly as many television productions, and in over 500 films. He recorded over 20 albums of his own compositions for Chappell from the mid-1950s on.

In France, he composed for famous artists such as Édith Piaf, Maurice Chevalier, Jean Sablon, and Charles Trenet and was a frequent broadcaster on Radio Luxembourg. His orchestral piece Volatiles became a widely known signature tune on France Inter radio, and another, Versailles was written for use as a theme tune in the earliest days of French Television. In the mid-1960s he also began regularly broadcasting in the UK on BBC Radio's Light Programme, where he was often paired with fellow bandleader Frank Chacksfield.

Roger Roger married the Swiss singer Eva Rehfuss, sister of baritone Heinz Rehfuss and great-granddaughter of composer Felix Mendelssohn in 1973. They had one child. He died in Deauville in 1995. Since his death, renewed interest in light music has seen several CD albums released, both in dedicated albums and in compilations, including music used as the audio soundtrack for broadcasting test card transmissions in the UK.

== Music ==
Comparing him to Raymond Scott and Esquivel, Neil Strauss in The New York Times called Roger Roger "quirky but never zany, melodic but never melodramatic", and "a composer who managed to give all-purpose music a purpose". Characteristic of his many distinctive short orchestral pieces is Busy Streets, which became something of a light music classic in the 1960s. It was first issued under its French title Tourbillon De Paris in 1962 on a Mode LP in France and then two years later on a Pye Golden Guinea LP in the UK. Pieces such as Asia Minor, Greenland Sleigh Dogs (aka Alaska) and Long Hot Summer became familiar as staples of the BBC test card music soundtracks during the 1960s and 1970s. His City Movement (1960) was used in Britain as the theme for the BBC television programme Compact.

Under the name Cecil Leuter, Roger Roger was one of the first (among others such as Pierre Henry, Jean-Jacques Perrey, and Wendy Carlos) to experiment with the Moog synthesizer. His Pop Electronique album was released in 1969, five years after Bob Moog put his electronic device on the market. It was reissued by Fifth Dimension in 2016.

In 1971 he released the album Jungle Obsession, on Neuilly Records, with frequent collaborator and childhood friend Nino Nardini. It has become a classic of the musical exotica genre. Intended as a sound library recording, it soon took on a life of its own. Although clearly influenced by the exotica arrangements of Les Baxter, Martin Denny, Frank Hunter and Dick Hyman, it went beyond the simple themes used by those composers to employ "a series of motifs, leitmotifs, and modes that were out of the musical sphere at the time: they took rock and classical and bossa and jazz and easy listening, wove them together with polyrhythmic invention and a boatload of sound effects".

His piece "Komic Kapers" was used in the 1950s by the Commonwealth cartoon distribution company. They put it as the opening music when adding sound to many of Paul Terry's silent Farmer Alfalfa cartoons from the 1920s (also known as Farmer Grey). Although never chosen by Terry, Roger's piece was indelibly imprinted on a whole generation of children as the signature tune for these strange, eerie, frantic cartoons. He is also listed as the composer for two episodes of the Flash Gordon (1954) television series, and for the series' incidental music. Some of his work, including Toccata, a concert piece for organ, was used for the soundtrack of the British television series The Prisoner in 1967. Another notable library music cue of Roger's, titled "The Toy Shop Window", was used as the theme tune from the animated television cartoon Spunky and Tadpole. An example of the continuing relevance of his library music for film (though often used to evoke nostalgia) is the placing of his piece Scenic Railway in The Stepford Wives (2004).

In France, some of Roger Roger's more extended suites, such as the Suite météo (Weather Suite) of 1970 and the seven movement symphonic suite Les Parfums (commissioned by Radio France's Light Music service in 1973) have been issued on the Orpheus label. Other larger compositions include the Jazz Concerto for harp and orchestra (written for Freddy Alberti) and the symphonic suite Personnages et figurines (1980). One of his last works was Du coté de chez Gatsby, a tribute to the American writer Scott Fitzgerald.

== Discography ==
Thrilling, Roger Roger and his Orchestra (MGM E3201, 1955). Includes Small Talk, In Costa-Rica, Please Do, Paris Waltz, It's You, Ecuador, Chinese Bolero, Thrilling, Joke, Can Can

Tourbillon De Paris, Roger Roger and the Mode Symphony Orchestra (Mode Disques MDINT 9080, 1962). Includes Tourbillon De Paris, Nuages, Fiddles And Bows, L´Orgue De La Fete, Trianon, Menuet, Valse En Re B, Sous Les Ponts De Paris, Joyeux Reveil, Badinage, Paris Palace-Hotel, Marchande De Fruits, En Bateau Mouche

Grande Travaux (Basta 30-9076-2, 1985). Music For film production, 1956-1966, performed by Holland's Metropole Orchestra. Includes Clowneries, Contorsions (The Grip of Fear), Danse Lunaire, Djanina, Eccentric Walk, Fête Foraine, La Foret Enchantée, Grands Travaux, Machinisme, Le Moustique, Nounous et Pioupious, Paris Pullman, Polka Mauve, Profondeurs (Lunar Landscape), Scenic Railway, Tele-Ski, Traffic Boom

Trésors symphoniques de Roger Roger, (Orphée 58). Vol. 1, Suite météo; Vol 2, Suite Les Parfums

Whimsical Days (Vocalion CDLK 4229, 2004), compilation CD, collects together 19 original compositions by Roger Roger, remastered from the original recordings. It includes the short orchestral pieces Busy Streets, Chinese Lantern, Country Romance, Fantasy Waltz, Greenland Sleigh Dogs, The Jolly Postman, Western Montage and Whimsical Days, as well as three suites: The Twenties Suite (four movements), Snapshots (four movements) and Gershwinesque (three movements).

Other long playing releases (mostly featuring arrangements of music by other composers) include Musique Pour Rêver (Vega, 1957), The Heart of Paris (Decca, 1958), Invitation to Paris (Everest, 1960), and Grand Prix: Melodies Of The Four Winds (Columbia, 1962).

The following records were issued by the US production music label Major Music, mostly untitled.

Catalog Nr.	Artists	Track listing
5217	Roger Roger	A – 1. Dramatic Appasionata, 2. Dramatic Appasionata; B – Morning Breezes
5218	Roger Roger	A – The Fascinating Valse; B – 1. Peasant Dance, 2. Cavern Mysterioso
5219	Roger Roger	A – Dawn's Awakening; B – 1. Ballerina Petite, 2. Fanfare
5220	Roger Roger	A – The Coyote Serenade; B – Metropolitan Rhapsody
5222	Roger Roger	A – 1. The Queen's Processional, 2. The Clown's Frolic; B – 1. Devilish Menace, 2. Dismal Mists; 3. Caribbean Winds, 4. Rhythm of Doom
5224	Roger Roger	A – 1. Adoration of Love, 2. Komic Kapers, 3. Dramatic Finale, 4. Uplift Finale, 5. Steps of Mystery; B – Our Industrial World
5225	Roger Roger	A – 1. Love Triumphant, 2. Tipsy Mockingbird; B – 1. Deserted City, 2. Rue de la Paix, 3. The Cafe Musette Waltz
5231	Roger Roger	A – Hope's Awakening; B – Tread of Doom
5266	Geo. S. Chase/Roger Roger	A – Valse Charmante (Geo S. Chase); B – Ivory Coast (Roger Roger)
5267	Roger Roger	A – Damascus; B – Rendezvous, Romantic Interlude, Reverie
5270	Geo. S. Chase/Roger Roger	A – Fujiyama (Geo S. Chase); B – Himalaya/Chopsticks/Everest (Roger Roger)
5272	Geo. S. Chase/Roger Roger	A – A Coin in the Fountain (Geo S. Chase); B – Fun on Ice (Roger Roger)
