= Siren of the Tropics =

1927 French silent film

Siren of the Tropics La sirène des tropiques
- Directed by: Mario Nalpas; Henri Étiévant
- Written by: Maurice Dekobra
- Produced by: Louis Aubert
- Starring: Josephine Baker; Pierre Batcheff; Régina Dalthy; Regina Thomas
- Cinematography: Paul Cotteret; Albert Duverger; Maurice Hennebains
- Music by: Scott Paulson
- Production company: Etablissements Louis Aubert
- Distributed by: La Centrale Cinématographique
- Release dates: 30 December 1927 (France); 22 September 1929 (USA)
- Running time: 86 minutes
- Country: France
- Languages: Silent film French intertitles

Siren of the Tropics (French: La Sirène des tropiques) is a 1927 French silent film starring Josephine Baker. Directed by Mario Nalpas and Henri Étiévant and set in the West Indies, the film tells the story of a native girl named Papitou (Baker) who falls in love with a French man named André Berval (Pierre Batcheff).

== Plot ==
The film is set in a fictional colony called Monte Puebla. Monte Puebla incorporates many colonial stereotypes, with the name suggesting that it could be a Spanish colony, the grass skirts and roofs suggesting a Polynesian influence, and the clothing being a jumble of multiple cultures. The story begins when a rich Parisian man named Marquis Sévéro wishes to divorce his wife and marry his goddaughter, Denise, but Denise is in love with an engineer named André Berval. In order to get rid of Berval, Marquis Sévéro sends him to the West Indies as a prospector, promising that he can marry Denise once he returns. After arriving in the West Indies, Berval meets a woman named Papitou. Papitou quickly falls in love with him, unaware of the fact that he is planning on marrying Denise upon his return to Paris. When Berval leaves the West Indies to return home, Papitou follows him despite the fact that he has a fiancée. Once she arrives in Paris, Papitou accepts that Berval loves only Denise, and finds her true calling as a music hall performer.

== Cast ==
- Josephine Baker as Papitou
- Pierre Batcheff as André Berval
- Régina Dalthy as La marquise Severo
- Regina Thomas as Denise
- Georges Melchior as Le comte Severo
- Kiranine as Le régisseur Alvarez
- Adolphe Candé as Le directeur

== Reception ==
Prior to the film's release, newspaper articles detailing Baker's tour through Europe piqued public interest. The film premiered in December 1927 in Stockholm, Sweden, and received almost unanimously positive reviews from film critics. The film was screened from December 1927 until July 1928, which was considered an exceptionally long running time. Most of these positive reviews focused on Baker's body, comparing her agile movements to those of animals. Following her positive reception in Siren of the Tropics and increased public interest surrounding her, Baker published an autobiography called Les mémoirs de Josephine Baker. Following the film's very successful premiere, Baker also had a doll made in her likeness and sold in Stockholm, and starred in a toothpaste commercial. This positive reception of Baker's feature film debut set the stage for her starring roles in the films Zouzou (1934) and Princesse Tam-Tam (1935).
