= Matrimonial Agency (1952 film) =

- Directed by: Jean-Paul Le Chanois
- Written by: Jean-Paul Le Chanois
- Produced by: Robert Dorfmann; Pierre Lévy
- Starring: Bernard Blier; Louis de Funès; Michèle Alfa
- Cinematography: Marc Fossard
- Edited by: Emma Le Chanois
- Music by: Joseph Kosma
- Production companies: Coopérative Générale du Cinéma Français; Silver Films
- Distributed by: Les Films Corona
- Release date: 21 May 1952
- Running time: 109 minutes
- Country: France
- Language: French
- Box office: $7.7 million

Matrimonial Agency (French: Agence matrimoniale) is a 1952 French comedy drama film directed by Jean-Paul Le Chanois, written by Jean-Paul Le Chanois, and starring Bernard Blier and Louis de Funès.

The film's sets were designed by the art director Max Douy.

== Plot ==
An average man inherits a marriage agency. He isn't prepared in any way to deal with this situation but step by step he lives up to the expectations.

== Partial cast ==
- Bernard Blier as Noël Pailleret (the modest bank clerk)
- Louis de Funès as Monsieur Charles
- Michèle Alfa as Gilberte Jolivet
- Julien Carette as Jérôme
- Jean-Pierre Grenier as Jacques
- Yolande Laffon as Madame Pailleret (Noël's mother)
- Anne Campion as Viviane Galey
- Marcelle Praince as Madame Martin
- Pierre Mondy as The client

== Bibliography ==
- Dayna Oscherwitz & MaryEllen Higgins. The A to Z of French Cinema. Scarecrow Press, 2009.
