= Katia Lova =

Bulgarian-born French film actress

- Born: 31 December 1914; Sofia, Bulgaria
- Died: 24 May 1994 (aged 79); Cannes, Alpes-Maritimes, France
- Occupation: Actress
- Years active: 1931-1949 (film)

Katia Lova (1914–1994) was a Bulgarian-born French film actress. Half-Bulgarian and half-Swiss, she settled in France in the early 1920s.

== Selected filmography ==
- Aces of the Turf (1932)
- Night in May (1934)
- Primerose (1934)
- Turandot, Princess of China (1935)
- Claudine at School (1937)
- The New Rich (1938)
- The Rebel (1938)
- Melody for You (1942)
- Le brigand gentilhomme (1943)
- The Dancer of Marrakesh (1947)

== Bibliography ==
- Goble, Alan. The Complete Index to Literary Sources in Film. Walter de Gruyter, 1999.
