= Georges Colin =

French actor (1880–1945)

Georges Colin (10 March 1880 – 14 January 1945) was a French actor.

== Selected filmography ==
- The Kiddies in the Ruins (1918)
- The Prosecutor Hallers (1930)
- The Train of Suicides (1931)
- The Eaglet (1931)
- End of the World (1931)
- The Imaginary Invalid (1934)
- Madame Angot's Daughter (1935)
- Claudine at School (1937)
- Street of Shadows (1937)
- The Call of Life (1937)
- The Benefactor (1942)
- Vautrin (1943)
- The Man Who Sold His Soul (1943)
- The Count of Monte Cristo (1943)
- The Exile's Song (1943)
