= The Dancer of Marrakesh =

1949 film

- Directed by: Léon Mathot
- Written by: Léopold Gomez
- Produced by: Robert Florat
- Starring: Yves Vincent; Katia Lova; Aimé Clariond
- Cinematography: Charles Bauer
- Edited by: Marguerite Beaugé
- Music by: José Padilla
- Production companies: Adria Films; Société Africaine Cinématographique
- Distributed by: DisCina
- Release dates: 1949; 19 April 1950 (general release)
- Running time: 98 minutes
- Country: France
- Language: French

The Dancer of Marrakesh (French: La danseuse de Marrakech) is a 1949 French drama film directed by Léon Mathot and starring Yves Vincent, Katia Lova and Aimé Clariond. It was made at the Victorine Studios in Nice with sets designed by the art director Claude Bouxin.

== Synopsis ==
A French officer serving in the French protectorate in Morocco falls in love with a native dancer in Marrakesh. A brother officer does his best to separate them.

== Cast ==
- Yves Vincent as Jean Portal
- Katia Lova as Sonia
- Habib Benglia as Taraor
- Aimé Clariond as Barjac
- Sirena Adgemova as Kalina
- Roland Armontel as Le général
- Lahcen Ben Idder Souissi
- Roger Bontemps as Bertin
- Lucien Callamand as Le coiffeur
- Raphaël Patorni as Le colonel
- Jacques Courtin as Un invité
- Raymond Francky
- Philippe Hersent
- Jean-Pierre Lombard
- Gina Manès

== Bibliography ==
- Dayna Oscherwitz & MaryEllen Higgins. The A to Z of French Cinema. Scarecrow Press, 2009.
