= André Hakim =

Egyptian film producer (1915–1980)

- Born: 5 December 1915; Alexandria
- Died: October 19, 1980 (aged 64); Los Angeles
- Other name: André Nessim Hakim
- Citizenship: Egypt
- Occupation: Film producer

André Nessim Hakim (December 5, 1915 in Alexandria, Egypt – October 19, 1980 in Los Angeles) was a film producer.

André and his brothers were in the film industry from the time they were teenagers. His brothers Robert and Raymond Hakim worked at Paramount Pictures before founding their own production company in France. André worked at 20th Century Fox. He produced such films as Mr. Belvedere Rings the Bell (1951), the anthology film, O. Henry's Full House (1952) and The Man Who Never Was (1956).

He was married to Susan Marie Zanuck, one of Darryl F. Zanuck's two daughters. They had a son named Andre Hakim Jr, who became a musician who played with Sly Stone. The couple divorced in 1967, after which Zanuck married Pierre-Francois Savineau.
