= Clockface Café =

1947 film

- Directed by: Jean Gehret; Henri Decoin
- Written by: Pierre Bénard; Henri Decoin
- Produced by: Maurice Saurel
- Starring: Bernard Blier; Blanchette Brunoy; Aimé Clariond
- Cinematography: Jacques Lemare
- Edited by: Charles Bretoneiche
- Music by: Henri Dutilleux
- Production company: Safia
- Distributed by: Société Nouvelle des Films Dispa
- Release date: 27 June 1947
- Running time: 87 minutes
- Country: France
- Language: French

Clockface Café (French: Le Café du Cadran) is a 1947 French drama film directed by Jean Gehret and Henri Decoin and starring Bernard Blier, Blanchette Brunoy and Aimé Clariond. The film's sets were designed by the art director Emile Alex.

== Synopsis ==
A young couple from Auvergne, Julien and Louise Couturier buy a café in the heart of Paris. The capital soon has a detrimental effect on them as Julien falls in with bad company and Louise flirts with violinist Luigi and develops a taste for expensive things.

== Cast ==
- Bernard Blier as Julien Couturier
- Blanchette Brunoy as Louise Couturier
- Aimé Clariond as Luigi
- Félix Oudart as Grégorio
- Charles Vissières as Victor
- Robert Le Fort as Jules
- Nane Germon as Jeanne
- Jean Deninx as Dumur
- Georges Bréhat as Aubert
- Olivier Darrieux as Achille
- Colette Vepierre as La bonne
- Jane Morlet as La concierge
- Marcel Lestan as Le nouveau patron
- Pierre Sergeol as Bianchi
- Robert Seller as Biscarra

== Bibliography ==
- Bessy, Maurice & Chirat, Raymond. Histoire du cinéma français: encyclopédie des films, 1940–1950. Pygmalion, 1986
- Rège, Philippe. Encyclopedia of French Film Directors, Volume 1. Scarecrow Press, 2009.
