= Court Waltzes =

1933 film

- Directed by: Ludwig Berger; Raoul Ploquin
- Written by: Robert Liebmann; Hans Müller; Jacques Bousquet
- Produced by: Günther Stapenhorst
- Starring: Fernand Gravey; Armand Dranem; Madeleine Ozeray
- Cinematography: Carl Hoffmann
- Edited by: Willy Zeyn
- Music by: Alois Melichar
- Production company: UFA
- Distributed by: L'Alliance Cinématographique Européenne
- Release date: 12 December 1933
- Running time: 85 minutes
- Country: Germany
- Language: French

Court Waltzes (French: La guerre des valses) is a 1933 musical film directed by Ludwig Berger and Raoul Ploquin and starring Fernand Gravey, Armand Dranem and Madeleine Ozeray. It was the French-language version of Waltz War, made by the German studio UFA and also directed by Berger. In the early years of sound it was common to shoot completely separate versions of films in different languages before dubbing became more established. This film was part of a trend of operetta films released during the decade. It was initially rejected by the British Board of Film Censors, but later passed with a U certificate.

== Cast ==
- Fernand Gravey as Franz
- Armand Dranem as Le juge
- Madeleine Ozeray as Queen Victoria
- Fernand Charpin as Joseph Lanner
- Pierre Mingand as Johann Strauss
- Janine Crispin as Katie
- Paul Ollivier as Le chambellan
- François Rozet as Prince Albert
- Arletty as La chocolatière
- Maximilienne as Une dame d'honneur
- Eric Roiné
- Nane Germon
- Jane Marken
- Willy Rozier
- Hélène Regelly

== Bibliography ==
- Bock, Hans-Michael; Bergfelder, Tim, eds. (2009). The Concise Cinegraph: Encyclopaedia of German Cinema. New York: Berghahn Books. ISBN 978-1-57181-655-9.
