= Robert Péguy =

French film director

- Born: 14 December 1883; Paris, France
- Died: 21 July 1968 (aged 84); Paris, France
- Occupations: Film director, screenwriter
- Years active: 1909–1949

Marcel Robert Péguy (14 December 1883 – 21 July 1968), publicly known as Robert Péguy and occasionally credited as Marcel Robert, was a French film director best remembered for his output spanning various commercial genres during the 1920s and 1930s.

== Career ==
=== Beginnings and silent films ===
Péguy was trained at the Conservatoire de Paris, and began his professional career as a stage actor at the Bouffes du Nord theater, where he was sometimes paired with another future director, Maurice Tourneur. He was introduced to filmmaking by animation pioneer Émile Cohl and, in 1907, started a mobile cinema business with him in western France. After Cohl was hired at major Gaumont, he recommended Péguy, who joined in 1909. He first worked as a screenwriter under the pen name Marcel Robert and wrote several scripts for the company's star director, Louis Feuillade. He would sell scripts rejected by Gaumont to competitor Lux Compagnie Cinématographique de France, whose boss invited him to get behind the camera. His directorial debut was a brief short called L'escarpin verni (lit. 'The Patent Leather Pump'), which was shot in a single day.

The director surrounded himself with a close knit troupe of crossovers from the stage, including the Étiévant family of thespians. He was also credited for pushing young actors into prominent roles, and gave Charles Vanel several of his early gigs, including his first appearance on record in a little known film named Jim Crow. Péguy was part of the medium's early development in France, and remembered facing the hostility of a producer when he tried to introduce close-ups to his work, which were then considered unaesthetic. When silent star Suzanne Grandais broke up with Gaumont in a salary dispute in 1913, her manager René d'Auchy retained Péguy's services to assist him as the director of a series of films made with German backing.

After serving in World War I, Péguy made a few minor pictures, before signing with Phocea-films in 1921 to make three vehicles for Euro western pioneer Joë Hamman, although only the first, the Italian-shot co-production L'Étrange aventure, appears to have been made. The film is sometimes credited to Hamman himself but is widely acknowledged to have been helmed by Péguy. In 1924, Péguy travelled to Mauritius, where he oversaw two back-to-back productions, including an adaptation of Paul et Virginie. He then teamed up with actor Nicolas Koline for two films, the first of which, the lighthearted 600,000 Francs a Month, was a hit. As a result, Péguy became identified as a comedy specialist for some time, a label he did not care for. He was not stranger to melodramas, often with religious themes. Having adapted the Christian novel The Snow on the Footsteps for Henri Étiévant, he directed for faith-based Nice producer Eugène Barbier, and would periodically return to the genre throughout his career. Mostly, Péguy was known as a fiscally responsible director, which he embraced.

=== Sound films ===
To learn sound filmmaking, Péguy joined major Pathé-Nathan where he first made storyboards for director Pierre Colombier, starting with 1930's The King of the Gate Crashers, before directing a few films himself. However, he felt underused and left within three years to exert more control over his career. Popular composer Vincent Scotto helped him set up an adaptation of his musical Au pays du soleil (which launched Rellys' film career), and scored several more of his works. In the mid-1930s, he founded the Films BAP (BAttesti–Péguy) company with Charles Battesti, which kept making the family-friendly product he was known for, although some dismissed it as formulaic and overly sentimental. Péguy prominently featured children in his works and built up child actress Jacotte Muller—often just called Jacotte—as an in-house star who elicited modest comparisons to Shirley Temple. He also returned to stagecraft as a writer, co-penning a comedy called Tyrannie, which was headlined by Émile Drain and debuted at Théâtre Charles-de-Rochefort in 1942.

Péguy was a horse betting enthusiast who boasted of considerable earnings from his hobby, and used the milieu as a backdrop for several of his later movies. His first post-World War II project, the equidian crime caper Master Love, was not well distributed, which he blamed on an influx of American films that followed the end of the conflict. Shortly after, he was announced as the director of a new Cagliostro adaptation, the second of a two-picture package from the Films de France company, which would pioneer subtractive color in the country. However, the first film was fraught with problems and Cagliostro did not get made. The 63-year old never shot a full-length feature again.

== Personal life ==
Péguy was kicked out of home after high school, when he chose to follow his artistic aspirations against his parents' wishes. His marriage made him the son-in-law of Émile Cohl, who played a part in his early film career. Péguy's daughter Paule subsequently served as his assistant. According to several sources, including an interview of Péguy himself, he was also a cousin of author Charles Péguy.

== Selected filmography ==
- The Snow on the Footsteps (1923)
- 600,000 Francs a Month (1926)
- Croquette (1927)
- Muche (1927)
- Paris-New York-Paris (1928)
- Kiss Me (1929)
- His Highness Love (1931)
- The Yellow House of Rio (1931)
- Clochard (1932)
- In the Land of the Sun (1934)
- Jacques and Jacotte (1936)
- The Mysterious Lady (1936)
- My Little Marquise (1937)
- Monsieur Breloque Has Disappeared (1938)
- Grandfather (1939)
- Notre-Dame de la Mouise (1941)
- Last Adventure (1942)
- White Wings (1943)
- Shot in the Night (1943)
- Master Love (1946)
- Vive la grève ! (short) (1949)
