= Aimé Clariond =

French actor (1894–1959)

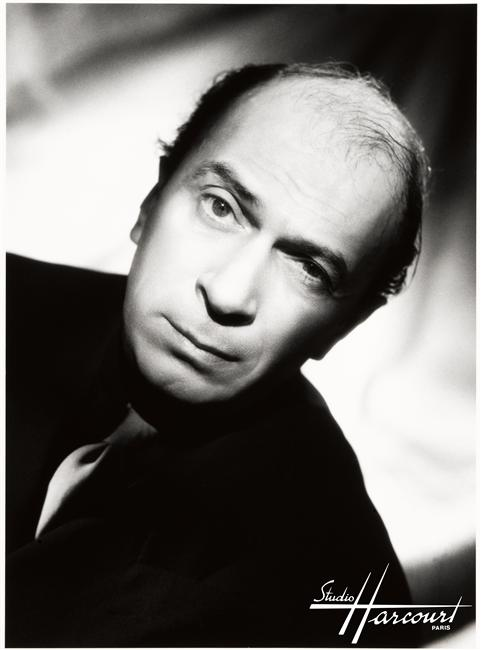
- Aimé Clariond in 1942 (Studio Harcourt)
- Born: Aimé Marius Clariond; 10 May 1894; Périgueux, France
- Died: 31 December 1959 (aged 65); Paris, France
- Occupation: Actor
- Years active: 1932–1956
- Spouses: Marie Louise Marthe Richard (m. 1921; div. 1941) Irène Morozov (m. 1942)
- Children: 6

Aimé Clariond (10 May 1894 – 31 December 1959) was a French stage and film actor.

Clariond was born in Périgueux, Dordogne, France and died in Paris.

== Selected filmography ==
- The Brothers Karamazov (1931) - Ivan Karamazoff
- Amourous Adventure (1932)
- Take Care of Amelie (1932)
- The Faceless Voice (1933) - Maître Clément
- Mariage à responsabilité limitée (1934)
- Beauty of the Night (1934) - Claude Davène
- Sans famille (1934) - James Milligan
- Prince Jean (1934) - Le baron d'Arnheim
- La Route impériale (1935) - Col. Stark
- Crime and Punishment (1935) - Loujine
- Lucrezia Borgia (1935) - Niccollo Machiavelli
- Widow's Island (1937) - Richard Trent
- The Lie of Nina Petrovna (1937) - Baron Engern
- La Marseillaise (1938) - Monsieur de Saint Laurent
- Boys' School (1938) - M. Boisse - le directeur
- The Little Thing (1938) - Monsieur Eyssette père
- Katia (1938) - Le comte Schowaloff
- The Rebel (1938) - Commandant Derive
- Behind the Facade (1939) - Le président Bernier
- Entente cordiale (1939) - L'ambassadeur de Russie
- Coups de feu (1939) - Le Capitaine Hans von Mahringer
- Paris-New York (1940) - M. de Saintonge
- Sarajevo (1940) - Le prince de Montenuovo
- Madame Sans-Gêne (1941) - Le chef de la police Fouché
- Miss Bonaparte (1942) - Le duc de Morny
- The Duchess of Langeais (1942) - Ronquerolles
- The Man Who Played with Fire (1942) - Monsieur Desert
- Le Destin fabuleux de Désirée Clary (1942) - Joseph Bonaparte
- Business Is Business (1942) - Le marquis de Porcellet
- Monsieur La Souris (1942) - Simon Negretti
- Patricia (1942) - Jacques Pressac
- The Blue Veil (1942) - Le juge d'instruction
- The Count of Monte Cristo (1943) - Monsieur de Villefort
- L'auberge de l'abîme (1943) - Le docteur Thierry
- The Exile's Song (1943) - Riedgo
- The Phantom Baron (1943) - L'évêque
- The Midnight Sun (1943) - Grégor
- Les Roquevillard (1943) - Maître Bastard
- Domino (1943) - Heller
- Ceux du rivage (1943) - Rocheteau
- My Last Mistress (1943) - Jean Laurent
- Colonel Chabert (1943) - Maître Derville
- The White Waltz (1943) - Le professeur d'Estérel
- La vie de plaisir (1944) - Monsieur de Lormel - un aristocrate désargenté, le père d'Hélène
- L'enfant de l'amour (1944) - Rantz
- Mademoiselle X (1945) - Michel Courbet
- The Great Pack (1945) - Martin du Bocage
- My First Love (1945) - Le romancier Maurice Fleurville
- The Captain (1946) - Concini
- Strange Fate (1946) - Le professeur Gallois
- Monsieur Grégoire Escapes (1946) - M. Berny
- The Eternal Husband (1946) - Michel Veltchaninov
- The Adventures of Casanova (1947) - Don Luis
- The Seventh Door (1947) - Le fonctionnaire
- Clockface Café (1947) - Luigi
- Monsieur Vincent (1947) - Le cardinal de Richelieu
- Fantomas Against Fantomas (1949) - Bréval
- 56 Rue Pigalle (1949) - Ricardo de Montalban
- The Farm of Seven Sins (1949) - Le marquis de Siblas
- The Dancer of Marrakesh (1949) - Barjac
- The Wreck (1949) - Marcadier
- La ronde des heures (1950) - Méry-Mirecourt
- The Dancer of Marrakesh (1950) - Barjac
- Rue des Saussaies (1951) - Cortedani
- Foyer perdu (1952) - Georges Fontaine
- Royal Affairs in Versailles (1954) - Rivarol
- Napoleon (1955) - Corvisart (uncredited)
- Je suis un sentimental (1955) - M. de Villeterre
- If Paris Were Told to Us (1956) - Beaumarchais
- Le Secret de soeur Angèle (1956) - Le médecin-chef
- Deadlier Than the Male (1956) - Monsieur Prévost
- Marie Antoinette Queen of France (1956) - Louis XV
- Les Lumières du soir (1956) - Franz Hassler
- Three Days to Live (1957) - Charlie Bianchi
- On Foot, on Horse, and on Wheels (1957) - M. de Grandlieu
- Nathalie (1957) - Le comte Auguste Claude Superbe de Lancy
- The Possessors (1958) - Gérard de La Monnerie
- Délit de fuite (1959) - Aitken
- A Mistress for the Summer (1960) - Rosenkrantz (final film role)

== Bibliography ==
- Waldman, Harry. Maurice Tourneur: The Life and Films. McFarland & Co, 2008.
