= Dranem =

Dranem, c.1910

Dranem (23 May 1869 – 13 October 1935) was a French comic singer, music hall, stage and film actor.

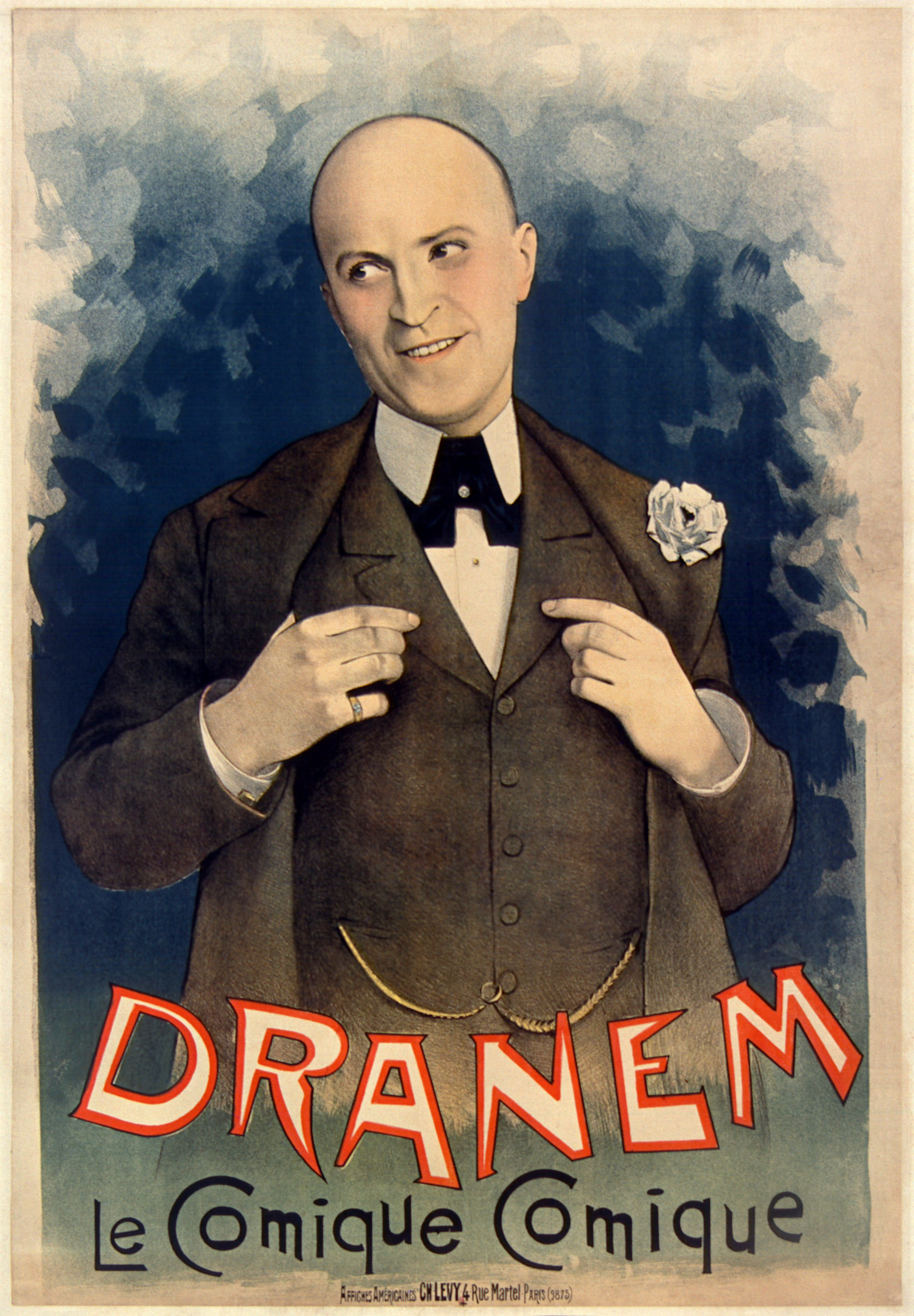
Dranem, 1895 poster

== History ==
Born Armand Ménard, in Paris, he began working as an apprentice jeweler in a local shop before embarking on a career in entertainment. Adopting the singular stage name of Dranem, a palindromic anagram of "Menard," he made his debut performance in 1894. In 1895, he performed with fellow newcomers Félix Mayol and Max Dearly in the "Concert Parisien" from where he went on to become a leading music hall entertainer in his own comic absurdist genre. In 1899, he was signed to perform at the famous Eldorado Club, where he appeared regularly for the next twenty years.

Dranem's comedic singing routine brought a loyal following, and his work made him a very wealthy man. In 1910, he purchased the Château de Ris in the town of Ris-Orangis south of Paris and established a charitable foundation to operate the large building as a senior citizens home for retired performers. On the grounds, a bandstand and an open-air theatre provided entertainment. His "Dranem Foundation" continued to operate until the year 2000, and the property remains a government operated retirement home open to all members of the public. During World War I, Dranem continued his benevolence by performing for the troops at music halls and for wounded soldiers at military hospitals.

Active in variety shows, café-concerts, and as a performer in operettas, Dranem also acted and sang in live theatre and in film. He made his screen debut in the 1902 Gaumont silent film "Bonsoir m'sieurs dames" directed by Alice Guy. Although he appeared in two more silent films, as well as two 1905 Phonoscènes (an early Sound-on-disc system) the advent of synchronized sound film in the late 1920s made him much in demand for screen roles featuring his singing routines. In 1932 alone, he appeared in six films and another six over the next three years.

He appeared at the Paris Opéra-Comique as Buteux in La fille de Madame Angot in 1918 and as the caissier in Les brigands in 1931.

Dranem died in Paris in 1935 at the age of sixty-six and was buried at the Château de Ris.

== Selected filmography ==
- King of the Hotel (1932)
- Monsieur Albert (1932)
- Miche (1932)
- He Is Charming (1932)
- Ciboulette (1933)
- Court Waltzes (1933)
- The Imaginary Invalid (1934)
- The Mascot (1935)
