= Madly in Love (1943 film) =

1943 film

- Directed by: Paul Mesnier
- Written by: Paul Mesnier; Max d'Yresme (novel)
- Produced by: André Tranché
- Starring: Elvire Popesco; Henri Garat; Micheline Francey
- Cinematography: Georges Clerc
- Music by: Roger-Roger
- Production company: Monaco Films
- Distributed by: Radio Cinéma
- Release date: 16 June 1943
- Running time: 85 minutes
- Country: France
- Language: French

Madly in Love (French: Fou d'amour) is a 1943 French comedy film directed by Paul Mesnier and starring Elvire Popesco, Henri Garat and Micheline Francey. The film's sets were designed by the art director René Renoux.

== Synopsis ==
The son of a department store owner falls in love with one of the customers. He discovers that she is the goddaughter of a professor who runs a private psychiatric hospital. In order to spend more time with her he decides to pretend to be mad and have himself admitted to the hospital as a patient.

== Main cast ==
- Elvire Popesco as Arabella
- Henri Garat as Claude Sauvin
- Andrex as Ulysse
- Julien Carette as L'homme aux mouches
- Micheline Francey as Solange Perrier
- Marcel Vallée as Monsieur Sauvin
- Jacques Louvigny as Le professeur Hauteclerc
- Fred Pasquali as Le parieur
- Sinoël as Le vieux client
- Jean Rigaux as Le ténor
- Paul Gobert as Le docteur Bardin
- Viviane Gosset as Noémie
- Marcelle Rexiane as La pudibonde
- Simone Allain as Madame Hauteclerc

== Bibliography ==
- Holmstrom, John. The Moving Picture Boy: An International Encyclopaedia from 1895 to 1995. Michael Russell, 1996.
