= Julien Carette =

French actor (1897–1966)

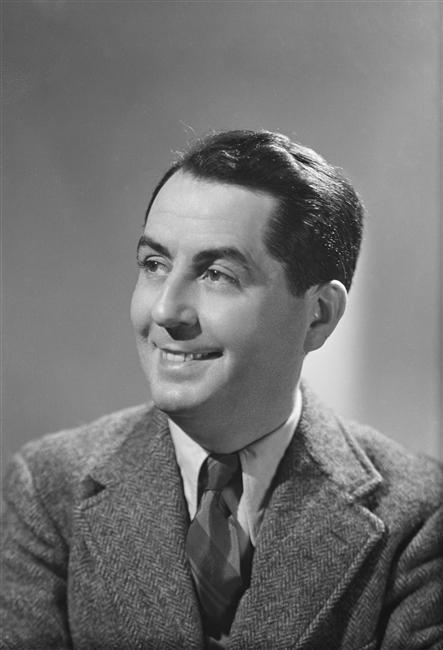
- Born: Julien Henri Carette; 23 December 1897; Paris, France
- Died: 20 July 1966 (aged 68); Saint-Germain-en-Laye, France
- Occupation: Actor
- Years active: 1931–1964

Julien Henri Carette (23 December 1897 – 20 July 1966) was a French film actor. He appeared in more than 120 films between 1931 and 1964.

== Selected filmography ==
- American Love (1931) - Lepape
- Seul (1932) - Michel
- Fun in the Barracks (1932) - Un cavalier (uncredited)
- Passionately (1932) - Auguste
- L'affaire est dans le sac (1932) - Clovis
- Baby (1933) - Pat
- La pouponnière (1933) - Le domestique
- Je te confie ma femme (1933) - Nicou
- The Empress and I (1933) - Le médecin-major
- Goodbye, Beautiful Days (1933) - Fred
- Gonzague (1933)
- George and Georgette (1934) - Georges
- My Heart Is Calling You (1934) - Coq
- Le greluchon délicat (1934) - Emile
- Un petit trou pas cher (1934)
- Le billet de mille (1935) - Un inspecteur
- Turandot (1935)
- Ferdinand the Roisterer (1935) - Farjol
- Gangster malgré lui (1935)
- L'heureuse aventure (1935) - Labaume
- Wedding Night (1935) - Duvallier
- Et moi, j'te dis qu'elle t'a fait de l'oeil (1935) - Auguste
- Paris Camargue (1935) - Escanette
- Speak to Me of Love (1935) - Wolff
- Dora Nelson (1935) - Fouchard
- Fanfare of Love (1935) - Pierre
- The Hortensia Sisters (1935) - Mazareaud
- Charley's Aunt (1936) - Spettik
- Le Golem (1936) - (uncredited)
- Marinella (1936) - Trombert
- 27 Rue de la Paix (1936) - Jules
- Adventure in Paris (1936) - Le chasseur du restaurant
- La Reine des resquilleuses (1937) - Richard
- The Grand Illusion (1937) - Cartier - l'acteur
- Gribouille (1937) - Lurette
- The Kings of Sport (1937) - Vachette
- La fessée (1937) - Le valet de chambre
- Les chevaliers de la cloche (1938) - le clochard Picolard
- La Marseillaise (1938) - Un volontaire
- Le monsieur de 5 heures (1938) - Amédée
- Les gaietés de l'exposition (1938) - Le premier détective
- Café de Paris (1938) - Le journaliste
- The Curtain Rises (1938) - Lurette - le journaliste
- L'accroche-coeur (1938) - Le barman
- Lights of Paris (1938) - Le vendeur de postes
- La route enchantée (1938) - Cosaque
- Je chante (1938) - Julien Lorette
- La Bête Humaine (1938) - Pecqueux
- Coral Reefs (1939) - Havelock
- Behind the Facade (1939) - Le soldat
- The World Will Tremble (1939) - Julien Bartaz
- Le paradis des voleurs (1939) - Scotland
- The Rules of the Game (1939) - Marceau, le braconnier
- The Duraton Family (1939) - Paradis
- Beating Heart (1940) - Yves Calubert
- Thunder Over Paris (1940) - Juvénal - l'épicier
- Sixième étage (1940) - Max Lescalier
- Parade en sept nuits (1941) - Anicet - l'employé de la fourrière
- Fromont jeune et Risler aîné (1941) - Achille
- La prière aux étoiles (1941) - Frédéric Richaud
- Sideral Cruises (1942) - Lucien Marchand
- Soyez les bienvenus (1942)
- Love Letters (1942) - Loriquet - le maître à danser
- Une étoile au soleil (1943) - Plessis
- The Lucky Star (1943) - Le parisien
- À la Belle frégate (1943) - Pierre
- Monsieur des Lourdines (1943) - Albert
- Madly in Love (1943) - L'homme aux mouches
- Goodbye Leonard (1943) - Félicien Léonard - un fabricant de farces et attrapes ruiné
- Bonsoir mesdames, bonsoir messieurs (1944) - Sullivan
- Night Shift (1944) - Auguste Masson
- Le merle blanc (1944) - Hyacinthe Camusset
- Vingt-quatre heures de perm (1945) - Gaston Boran
- Sylvie and the Ghost (1946) - Hector
- Messieurs Ludovic (1946) - Julien
- Impasse (1946) - Michel
- Gates of the Night (1946) - Monsieur Quinquina
- Something to Sing About (1947) - Robert
- Last Chance Castle (1947) - Faustin
- Love Around the House (1947) - Le père Jus
- La fleur de l'âge (1947) - Le Parisien
- The Murdered Model (1948) - Léonisse
- Une si jolie petite plage (1949) - Le voyageur de commerce
- Night Round (1949) - Trinquet
- Keep an Eye on Amelia (1949) - Pochet - le père d'Amélie
- Branquignol (1949) - Lui-même en majordome - puis en machiniste de théâtre minable
- Amédée (1950) - Ange-Louis
- Marie of the Port (1950) - Thomas Viau
- His Last Twelve Hours (1950) - Amedeo Santini
- The Winner's Circle (1950) - Simon
- Without Leaving an Address (1951) - Le tapissier
- Bernard and the Lion (1951) - Le narrateur (voice)
- The Red Inn (1951) - Pierre Martin
- Rome-Paris-Rome (1951) - Direttore parigino dei vagoni letto
- Matrimonial Agency (1952) - Jérôme
- Drôle de noce (1952) - Julien Barbezat - concierge
- Holiday for Henrietta (1952) - Arthur - le chef des gangsters
- Au diable la vertu (1953) - Tellier
- Good Lord Without Confession (1953) - Eugène
- The Love of a Woman (1953) - Le Quellec
- What Scoundrels Men Are! (1953) - Padre di mariuccia
- Fraternité (1954, TV Movie)
- House of Ricordi (1954) - Felix - l'oste
- Sur le banc (1954) - Sosthène
- Pas de coup dur pour Johnny (1955) - Mimile
- Scandal in Montmartre (1955) - Le portier de l'Arc en Ciel
- Si Paris nous était conté (1956) - Un Cocher
- Meeting in Paris (1956) - L'encaisseur
- Ces sacrées vacances (1956) - Le premier campeur
- Coup dur chez les mous (1956) - Le Suisse
- Forgive Us Our Trespasses (1956) - La père Rapine
- Paris, Palace Hotel (1956) - Bébert
- Crime and Punishment (1956) - Pierre Marcellin
- I'll Get Back to Kandara (1956) - Grindel - le gardien de prison
- Les 3 font la paire (1957) - Léon, le patron du bistrot (uncredited)
- Le temps des oeufs durs (1958) - Grillot
- La belle et le tzigane (1958) - Grand Robert
- Le Miroir à deux faces (1958) - Albert Benoît (uncredited)
- Le joueur (1958) - Bagdovitch (uncredited)
- Archimède le clochard (1959) - Félix - le clochard aux chiens
- The Green Mare (1959) - Philibert
- Pantalaskas (1960) - Zuwalki
- La 1000eme fenêtre (1960) - Grand-père Billois
- Vive Henri IV... vive l'amour! (1961) - Epernon
- Mon oncle du Texas (1962) - Dédé Girofle
- La foire aux cancres (Chronique d'une année scolaire) (1963) - Le cheminot
- Les pieds nickelés (1964) - Merluche
- The Adventures of Salavin (1964) - Lhuillier - un clochard (final film role)
