= René Dary =

French actor (1905–1974)

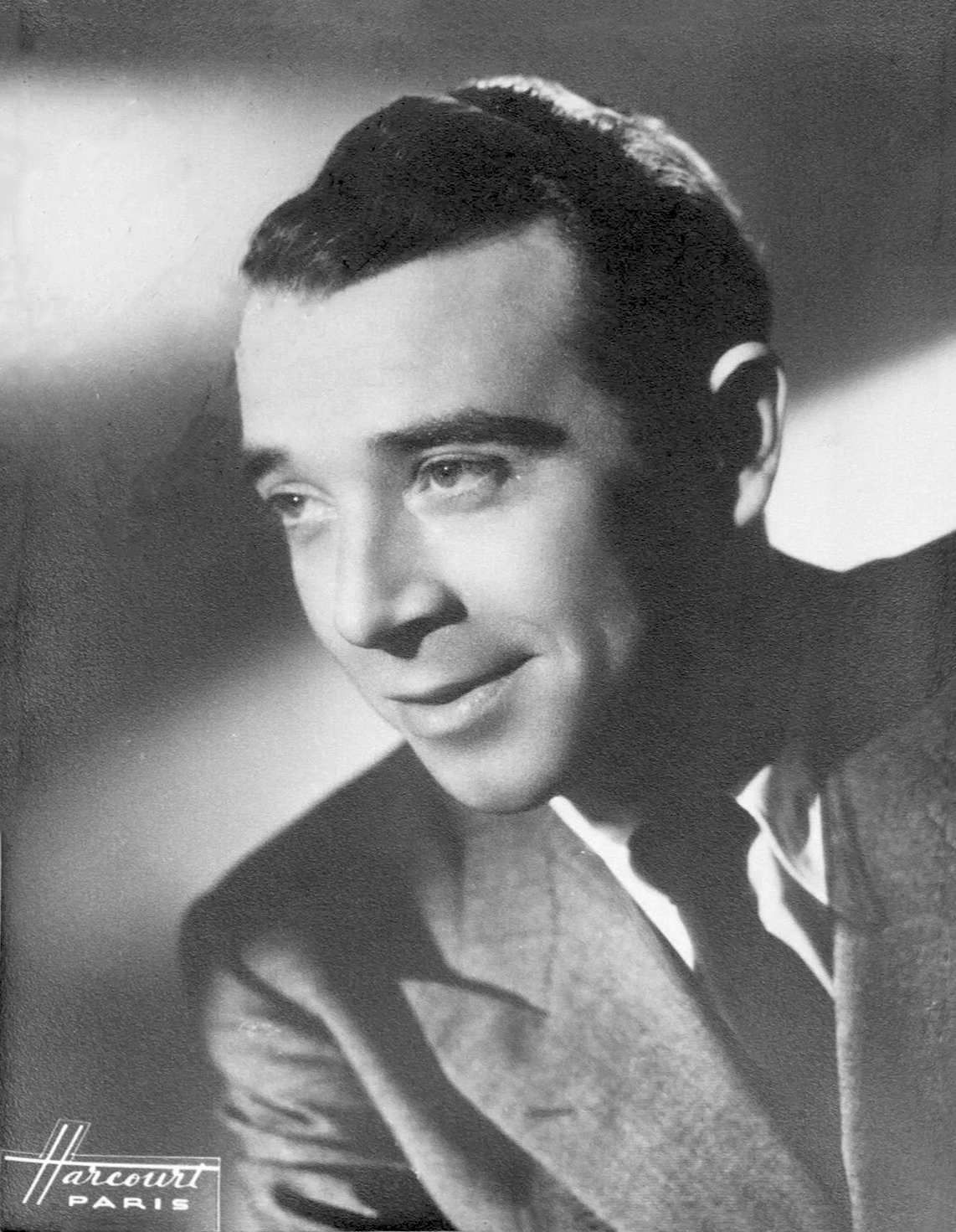
- René Dary
- Born: 18 July 1905; Paris, France
- Died: 6 October 1974 (aged 69); Marseille, France
- Other name: Anatole Clément Mary
- Occupation: Actor
- Years active: 1909–1974 (film)

René Dary (19 July 1905 – 6 October 1974) was a French film actor. Dary began his career as a child actor.

== Selected filmography ==
See Bébé for his 1910-1913 short silent comedy films in which he acted as a child named Bébé.

- Sidonie Panache (1934)
- The Lie of Nina Petrovna (1937)
- S.O.S. Sahara (1938)
- The Postmaster's Daughter (1938)
- The Rebel (1938)
- The Spirit of Sidi-Brahim (1939)
- Moulin Rouge (1941)
- Melody for You (1942)
- Eight Men in a Castle (1942)
- Home Port (1943)
- After the Storm (1943)
- Bifur 3 (1945)
- 120, Gare Street (1946)
- The Fugitive (1947)
- City of Hope (1948)
- Five Red Tulips (1949)
- Suzanne and the Robbers (1949)
- A Certain Mister (1950)
- One Only Loves Once (1950)
- Fugitive from Montreal (1950)
- Touchez pas au grisbi (1954)
- The Loves of Hercules (1960)
- Napoleon II, the Eagle (1961)
- Daniella by Night (1961)
- Trap for Cinderella (1965)
- Fire of Love (1967)

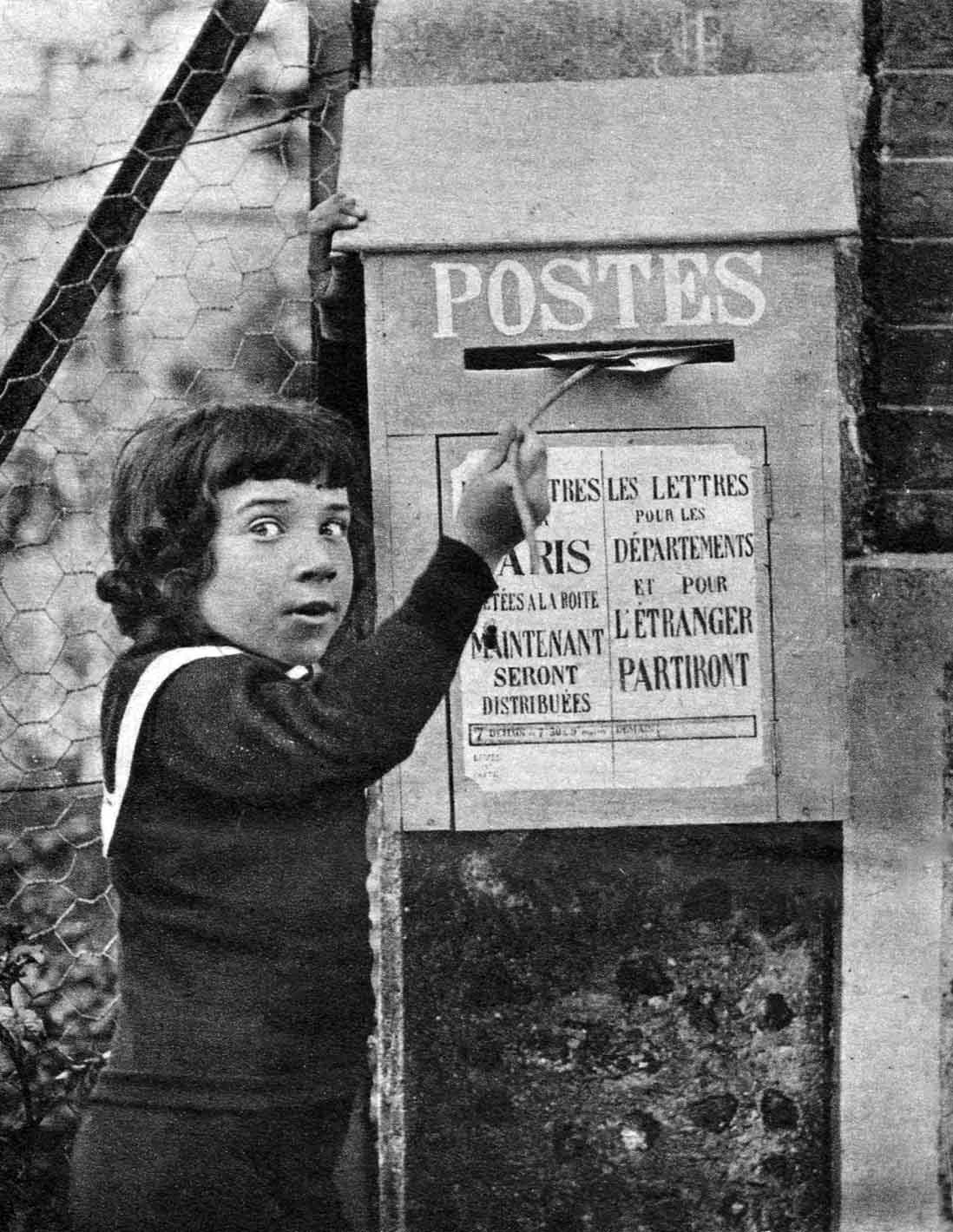
Bébé

== Bibliography ==
- Michael Witt & Michael Temple. The French Cinema Book. Palgrave Macmillan, 2008.
- Holmstrom, John. The Moving Picture Boy: An International Encyclopaedia from 1895 to 1995, Norwich, Michael Russell, 1996
