= Robert-Hugues Lambert =

French actor

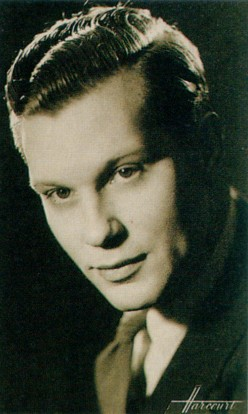
- Born: 1 April 1908; Paris, France
- Died: 7 March 1945 (aged 36); Flossenbürg concentration camp, Nazi Germany
- Occupation: Actor
- Years active: 1943

Robert-Hugues Lambert (1 April 1908 – 7 March 1945) was a French actor. He was active in film in 1943. A homosexual man, he was arrested in a gay bar by German troops in 1943 and died of exhaustion in Flossenbürg concentration camp two months before the end of the Second World War.

== Filmography ==
- Mermoz (1943)
