= Line Noro =

French actress

- Born: Aline Simone Noro; 22 February 1900; Houdelaincourt, Lorraine; France
- Died: 4 November 1985 (aged 85); Paris, France
- Occupation: Actress
- Years active: 1929 - 1959 (film)

Line Noro (22 February 1900 – 4 November 1985) was a French stage and film actress. During the 1930s she played glamorous, often exotic, women in films such as Pépé le Moko. Between 1945 and 1966 Noro was a member of the Comédie Française. She was married to the film director André Berthomieu.

== Selected filmography ==
- The Divine Voyage (1929)
- Montmartre (1931)
- La Tête d'un homme (1933)
- Little Jacques (1934)
- At the End of the World (1934)
- Last Hour (1934)
- Justin de Marseille (1935)
- The Flame (1936)
- Pépé le Moko (1937)
- Widow's Island (1937)
- J'accuse! (1938)
- Ramuntcho (1938)
- Street Without Joy (1938)
- The Well-Digger's Daughter (1940)
- The Snow on the Footsteps (1942)
- The Secret of Madame Clapain (1943)
- Vautrin (1943)
- The Count of Monte Cristo (1943)
- La Fiancée des ténèbres (1945)
- Girl with Grey Eyes (1945)
- Jericho (1946)
- Pastoral Symphony (1946)
- The Lost Village (1947)
- Eternal Conflict (1948)
- Murders (1950)
- The Lovers of Bras-Mort (1951)
- The Road to Damascus (1952)
- Before the Deluge (1954)

== Bibliography ==
- Hayward, Susan. French National Cinema. Routledge, 2006.
