= The Man Who Sold His Soul =

1943 film

- Directed by: Jean-Paul Paulin
- Written by: Charles Méré
- Based on: L'Homme qui vendit son âme au Diable by Pierre-Gilles Veber
- Produced by: Charles Méré
- Starring: Michèle Alfa; André Luguet; Mona Goya
- Cinematography: Jean Bourgoin
- Edited by: Andrée Sélignac
- Music by: Henri Goublier
- Production company: Les Films Minerva
- Distributed by: Les Films Minerva
- Release date: 20 September 1943
- Running time: 99 minutes
- Country: France
- Language: French

The Man Who Sold His Soul (French: L'homme qui vendit son âme) is a 1943 French drama film directed by Jean-Paul Paulin and starring Michèle Alfa, André Luguet and Mona Goya. The film's sets were designed by the art director Pierre Marquet. It is based on a 1918 novel by Pierre-Gilles Veber, previously adapted into a 1921 silent film.

== Synopsis ==
A bank headed by Martial is about to collapse, until he is approached by the evil Grégori who offers him unlimited credit so long as he agrees to do the utmost harm in the world. Martial is ultimately freed from the grip of this diabolical character by the moral Blanche.

== Cast ==
- Michèle Alfa as Blanche
- André Luguet as Le banquier Martial
- Mona Goya as Colette
- Robert Le Vigan as Grégori
- Jean Périer as Donatien
- Georges Colin as Surot
- Raymond Raynal as Le médecin
- Henri Charrett as Papavert
- Roger Vincent as Le gérant du 'Canari'
- Jean-Jacques Delbo as Armand
- Marcel Talmont as Le chef salutiste
- Lucien Hubert as Le portier
- Hélène Dartigue as Marie
- Renée Thorel as La capitaine de l'Armée du Salut
- Guita Karen as Juliette
- Pierre Larquey as L'abbé Lampin

== Bibliography ==
- Moraly, Yehuda. Revolution in Paradise: Veiled Representations of Jewish Characters in the Cinema of Occupied France. Liverpool University Press, 2019.
- Rège, Philippe. Encyclopedia of French Film Directors, Volume 1. Scarecrow Press, 2009.
