= 600,000 Francs a Month (1926 film) =

1926 film

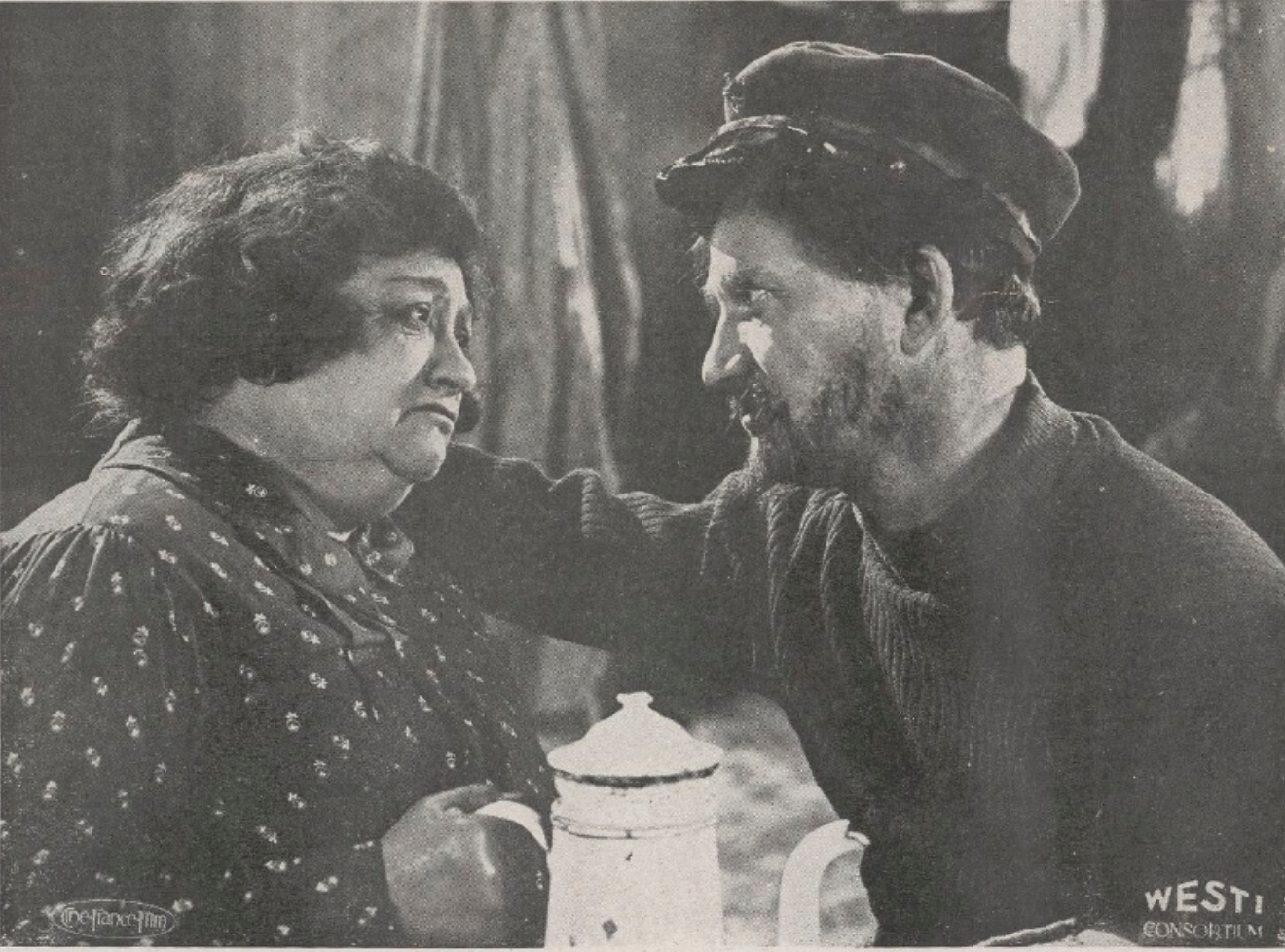
- Madeleine Guitty and Nicolas Koline
- Directed by: Nicolas Koline; Robert Péguy
- Written by: Jean Drault (novel)
- Produced by: Gregor Rabinovitch
- Starring: Charles Vanel; Madeleine Guitty
- Production company: Ciné France
- Distributed by: Pathé Consortium Cinéma
- Release date: 2 July 1926
- Country: France
- Languages: Silent; French intertitles

600,000 Francs a Month (French: 600 000 francs par mois) is a 1926 French silent comedy film directed by Nicolas Koline and Robert Péguy and starring Charles Vanel and Madeleine Guitty. It was released in the United Kingdom in 1927 with the alternative title of Mister Mustard's Millions.

It adapts a novel by Jean Drault.

In 1933 it was remade as 600,000 Francs a Month.

== Cast ==
- Nicolas Koline as Anatole Galupin
- Charles Vanel as John Durand
- Madeleine Guitty as Ernestine Galupin
- Hélène Darly as Anna Galupin
- Louis Vonelly as Le secrétaire

== Bibliography ==
- Parish, James Robert. Film Actors Guide. Scarecrow Press, 1977.
