= Henri Étiévant =

French actor and film director

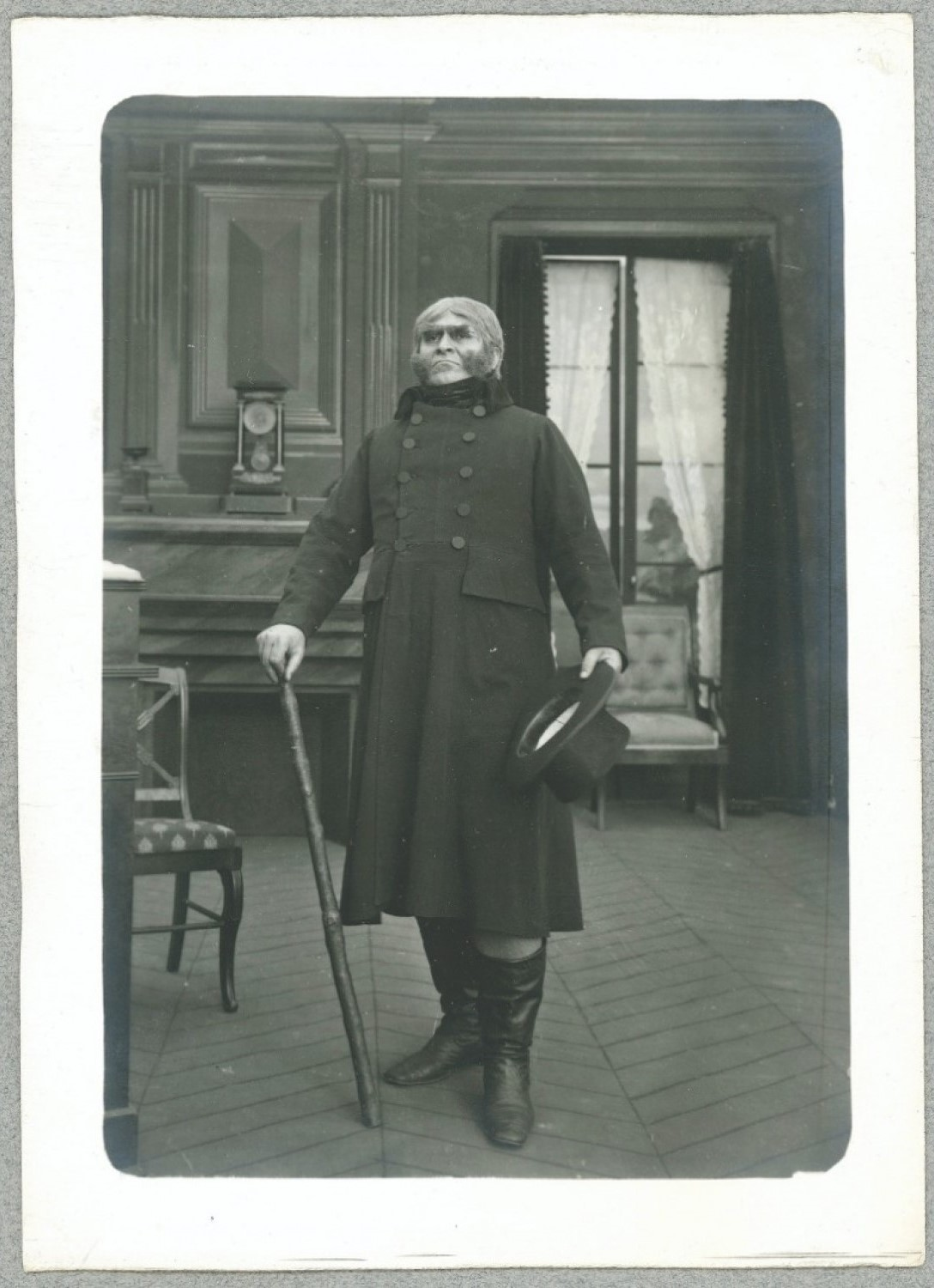

Henri Gaston Étiévan-Estival (13 March 1870 – 9 August 1953) was a French actor and film director.

Born in Paris, he trained at the National Conservatory of Dramatic Arts of Paris and was an experienced stage actor before he entered the world of film. He played Javert in Albert Capellani's 1912 silent film Les Miserables. He died in 1953 in the 11th arrondissement of Paris. His daughter, Yvette Etiévant, was also an actress.

== Selected filmography ==
- The Snow on the Footsteps (1923)
- The Lady of Lebanon (1926)
- Siren of the Tropics (1927) featuring Josephine Baker making her the first ever African-American woman to star in a major motion production.
- A Telephone Call (1932)
