= Fraternité (film) =

1954 film

- Directed by: René Lucot
- Written by: Fernand Fleuret; Georges Girard
- Starring: Julien Carette; Louis de Funès
- Release date: 4 March 1954 (France)
- Country: France
- Language: French

Fraternité English: Brotherhood, is a French comedy TV film from 1954, directed by René Lucot, written by Fernand Fleuret, starring Julien Carette and Louis de Funès.

== Cast ==
- Julien Carette
- Louis de Funès
- Hubert Deschamps
