= Home Port (1943 film) =

1943 film

- Directed by: Jean Choux
- Written by: Jean Choux; René Dary; Pierre Lestringuez; Marcel Rivet; Émile Roussel
- Produced by: Ferdinand Liffran; Adrien Remaugé
- Starring: Michèle Alfa; René Dary; Édouard Delmont
- Cinematography: René Gaveau; Marcel Grignon
- Edited by: Madeleine Gug
- Music by: Henri Verdun
- Production company: Pathé Consortium Cinéma
- Distributed by: Pathé Consortium Cinéma
- Release date: 10 February 1943
- Running time: 91 minutes
- Country: France
- Language: French

Home Port (French: Port d'attache) is a 1943 French comedy drama film directed by Jean Choux and starring Michèle Alfa, René Dary and Édouard Delmont. The film's sets were designed by the art directors Lucien Aguettand and Raymond Nègre.

== Synopsis ==
A sailor returns to port and is discharged from his ship. He arrives in a village and offers to help an older farmer restore his estate. While working there he encounters the attractive Ginette.

== Cast ==
- Michèle Alfa as Ginette
- René Dary as René
- Édouard Delmont as La père Garda
- Alfred Adam as Bertrand
- Albert Duvaleix as Le médecin
- Raymond Bussières as Fernand
- Ginette Baudin as Clara
- Jacques Sommet as Michel
- Henri Charrett as Auguste
- René Fluet as Le cuistot
- Alfred Baillou as Rémy
- Génia Vaury as Françoise
- Agnès Raynal as Zélie
- Janine Villard as Bichette
- Anne Iribe as La jeune employée
- Jean Daurand as Marius
- Henri Vidal as Raymond
- Cécile Didier as La mère de Bichette
- Max Doria as Zéphyrin
- Robert Le Fort as Un villageois
- Marcel Meral as Traviel
- René Michel as Le chauffeur du car

== Bibliography ==
- Crisp, Colin. French Cinema—A Critical Filmography: Volume 2, 1940–1958. Indiana University Press, 2015.
- Oscherwitz, Dayna & Higgins, MaryEllen. The A to Z of French Cinema. Scarecrow Press, 2009.
- Rège, Philippe. Encyclopedia of French Film Directors, Volume 1. Scarecrow Press, 2009.
