= Rognoni =

Rognoni is an Italian surname.

In particular, it can refer to a family of musicians, who also spelled it Rognino, Rogniono, Rognone, Rongione, or Rongioni. They were also called "Taeggio" (or "Taegio") after the presumed place of birth of Riccardo.

- Riccardo Rognoni or Rogniono (c. 1550–1620), Italian violinist and composer
- Francesco Rognoni Taeggio (second half of the 16th century – after 1626), Italian violinist composer, son of Riccardo
- Giovanni Domenico Rognoni Taeggio (2nd half of 16th century – before Oct 1624), Italian organist and composer, son of Riccardo

== Others with the surname ==
- Giorgio Rognoni (1946–1986), Italian professional football player
- Glòria Rognoni (1944–2025), Spanish actress
- Luigi Rognoni (1913–86), Italian musicologist and critic
- Maria Cecilia Rognoni Potocki, (born 1976), Argentine field hockey defender
- Raymond Rognoni (1892–1965), French actor and comedian
- Virginio Rognoni (1924–2022), Italian politician
