= The Count of Monte Cristo (1943 film) =

1943 film by Robert Vernay

- Directed by: Robert Vernay
- Written by: Charles Spaak
- Based on: Le Comte de Monte-Cristo by Alexandre Dumas père
- Produced by: Arys Nissotti; Pierre O'Connell
- Starring: Pierre Richard-Willm; Michèle Alfa; Aimé Clariond
- Cinematography: Victor Arménise
- Edited by: Jean Feyte
- Music by: Roger Desormière
- Production companies: Regina Films; Excelsa Film
- Distributed by: Variety Distribution
- Release date: 21 January 1943 (France)
- Running time: 183 minutes
- Countries: France; Italy
- Languages: French; Italian

The Count of Monte Cristo (French: Le comte de Monte Cristo) is a 1943 French-Italian historical drama film directed by Robert Vernay, with Ferruccio Cerio serving as the supervising director. Based on the classic 1844 novel Le Comte de Monte Cristo by Alexandre Dumas père, this two-part film stars Pierre Richard-Willm in the title role. It was shot at the Cinecittà Studios in Rome and the Cité Elgé in Paris. The film's sets were designed by the art director René Renoux.

== Plot ==
Edmond Dantès, first mate of a merchant ship returning from the Orient, having taken command of his ship after the death of the captain, docks at Elba to deliver a letter to Napoleon. As a result of this imprudence, committed to respect the will of his predecessor, he falls victim to a plot hatched by the sailor Caderousse, by the officer Fernand Mondego (later Count de Morcerf), in love with Mercédès, Dantès's fiancée, and by the magistrate Gérard de Villefort (who fears to be compromised by the ultra-Bonapartist activities of his father, General Noirtier). Dantes is then taken in secret to the depths of a castle off the coast of Marseille…

== Cast ==
- Pierre Richard-Willm as Edmond Dantès
- Michèle Alfa as Mercédès
- Aimé Clariond as Monsieur de Villefort
- Marcel Herrand as Bertuccio
- Ermete Zacconi as L'abbé Faria
- Alexandre Rignault as Caderousse
- Henri Bosc as Fernand, le comte de Morcerf
- Jacques Baumer as Noirtier
- André Fouché as Benedetto
- René Bergeron as Le policier
- Marie-Hélène Dasté as Madame de Villefort
- Yves Deniaud as Pénélan
- Fred Pasquali as Joannès
- Jean Joffre as Dantès père
- Paul Faivre as Brissard
- Georges Colin as Le juge d'instruction
- Line Noro as La Carconte
- Charles Granval as Monsieur Morel
