= The Secret of Madame Clapain =

1943 film

- Directed by: André Berthomieu
- Written by: Édouard Estaunié (novel); Françoise Giroud; Marc-Gilbert Sauvajon
- Starring: Raymond Rouleau; Line Noro; Michèle Alfa
- Cinematography: Jean Bachelet; Christian Matras
- Edited by: Andrée Danis
- Music by: Maurice Thiriet; Marceau Van Hoorebecke
- Production company: Jason Films
- Distributed by: Société Nouvelle des Films Dispa
- Release date: 11 August 1943
- Running time: 95 minutes
- Country: France
- Language: French

The Secret of Madame Clapain (French: Le secret de Madame Clapain) is a 1943 French crime film directed by André Berthomieu and starring Raymond Rouleau, Line Noro and Michèle Alfa.

The film's sets were designed by the art director Serge Piménoff.

== Cast ==
- Raymond Rouleau as François Berthier
- Line Noro as Madame Clapain
- Michèle Alfa as Thérèse Cadifon
- Cécile Didier as Mathilde Cadifon
- Fernand Charpin as Le docteur Joude
- Pierre Larquey as Hurteaux
- Raymonde Vernay as Pauline
- Germaine Stainval as Aurélie
- Michele Olivier as Florence
- Colette Régis as Une dame
- Alexandre Rignault as Le garde-chasse
- Louis Seigner as Ancelin
- Paul Faivre as Miron
- Pierre Cueille as Le joueur de billard
- Gaston Mauger as Le juge

== Bibliography ==
- Rège, Philippe. Encyclopedia of French Film Directors, Volume 1. Scarecrow Press, 2009.
