= Mermoz (film) =

1943 film

- Directed by: Louis Cuny
- Written by: Louis Cuny; Henry Dupuis-Mazuel; Marcelle Maurette
- Produced by: André Tranché
- Starring: Robert Hugues-Lambert; Lucien Nat; Camille Bert
- Cinematography: Jean Lehérissey
- Edited by: Madeleine Reculard; Marcelle Saysset
- Music by: Arthur Honegger
- Production company: Les Productions Françaises Cinématographiques
- Distributed by: Les Films Minerva
- Release date: 3 November 1943
- Running time: 100 minutes
- Country: France
- Language: French

Mermoz is a 1943 French biographical drama film directed by Louis Cuny and starring Robert Hugues-Lambert, Lucien Nat and Camille Bert. It is based on the life of the aviator Jean Mermoz. The film's score was composed by Arthur Honegger. The film's sets were designed by the art director Raymond Gabutti.

== Cast ==
- Robert Hugues-Lambert as Jean Mermoz
- Lucien Nat as Julien Pranville
- Camille Bert as Bouilloux-Laffont
- Jean Marchat as L'intellectuel
- Henri Vilbert as Le mécanicien de Fort-Lamy
- André Nicolle as Didier Daurat
- Max Fontal as Collenot
- Héléna Manson as Madame Mermoz

== Bibliography ==
- Bessy, Maurice & Chirat, Raymond. Histoire du cinéma français: encyclopédie des films, 1940–1950. Pygmalion, 1986.
- Fulcher, Jane F. Renegotiating French Identity: Musical Culture and Creativity in France During Vichy and the German Occupation. Oxford University Press, 2018.
- Rège, Philippe. Encyclopedia of French Film Directors, Volume 1. Scarecrow Press, 2009.
