= The Imaginary Invalid (1934 film) =

1934 film

- Directed by: Lucien Jaquelux
- Based on: The Imaginary Invalid by Molière
- Starring: Robert Pizani; Ginette Gaubert; Nane Germon
- Cinematography: Lejaret
- Release date: 31 July 1934
- Country: France
- Language: French

The Imaginary Invalid (French: Le malade imaginaire) is a 1934 French historical comedy film directed by Lucien Jaquelux and starring Robert Pizani, Ginette Gaubert and Nane Germon. It is an adaptation of the 1673 play The Imaginary Invalid by Molière, later turned into a 1952 West German film of the same title.

== Synopsis ==
A bedridden hypochondriac is exploited by his wife and physicians who run rings round him. Only his daughter really cares for him, and he is eventually convinced to allow her to marry the man she really wants rather than the match he had planned for her.

== Cast ==
- Robert Pizani as Thomas Diafoirus
- Ginette Gaubert as Angélique
- Nane Germon as Toinette
- Dranem as Argan
- Alfred Argus as Béralde
- Jacqueline Cartier as Louison
- Georges Colin as Docteur Diafoirus
- Robert Darthez as Cléante
- Marguerite Ducouret as Bélise
- Anthony Gildès as Monsieur Bonnefoi
- Raymond Ménage as Monsieur Purgon

== Bibliography ==
- Bessy, Maurice & Chirat, Raymond. Histoire du cinéma français: 1935-1939. Pygmalion, 1986.
- Crisp, Colin. Genre, Myth and Convention in the French Cinema, 1929-1939. Indiana University Press, 2002.
- Goble, Alan. The Complete Index to Literary Sources in Film. Walter de Gruyter, 1999.
- Rège, Philippe. Encyclopedia of French Film Directors, Volume 1. Scarecrow Press, 2009.
