= Vautrin (film) =

1943 film

- Directed by: Pierre Billon
- Written by: Marc-Gilbert Sauvajon; Pierre Benoit; Pierre Billon
- Based on: Novels by Honoré de Balzac
- Produced by: Jean Le Duc; Roger Sallard
- Starring: Michel Simon; Madeleine Sologne; Georges Marchal
- Cinematography: Paul Cotteret
- Edited by: André Gug; Madeleine Gug
- Music by: Maurice Thiriet
- Production company: Gaumont
- Distributed by: Compagnie Parisienne de Location de Films
- Release date: 13 December 1943
- Running time: 120 minutes
- Country: France
- Language: French

Vautrin is a 1943 French historical drama film directed by Pierre Billon and starring Michel Simon, Madeleine Sologne and Georges Marchal. It is based on the novels featuring the character of Vautrin by Honoré de Balzac—Illusions perdues, Père Goriot and Splendeurs et misères des courtisanes—and is one of a number of adaptations of the author's works during the Occupation period. It was shot at the Cité Elgé studios in Paris and on location around Fontainebleau. The film's sets were designed by the art director René Renoux.

== Cast ==
- Michel Simon as Jacques Collin dit Vautrin
- Madeleine Sologne as Esther Gobseck
- Georges Marchal as Lucien Chardon - marquis de Rubempré
- Louis Seigner as Le baron Frédéric de Nucingen
- Gisèle Casadesus as Clotilde de Grandlieu
- Lucienne Bogaert as Europe
- Renée Albouy as La marquise Jeanne d'Espard
- Line Noro as Madame de Saint-Estève
- Gisèle Préville as Diane de Maufrigneuse
- Marcel André as Camusot
- Georges Colin as Cotenson
- Nane Germon as Amélie Camusot
- Pierre Labry as Paccard
- Michèle Lahaye as Madame de Sérizy
- Tony Laurent as Le chef de la Sûreté
- Georges Marny as Eugène de Rastignac
- Guillaume de Sax as Le gouverneur
- Jacques Varennes as e procureur Grandville
- Marcel Mouloudji as Calvi
- Georges Paulais as Maître Dherville
- Lycette Darsonval as La danseuse
- Hélène Dartigue as Amélie
- René Blancard as Coquard

== Bibliography ==
- Goble, Alan. The Complete Index to Literary Sources in Film. Walter de Gruyter, 1999.
- Neupurt, Richard. French Film History, 1895–1946. University of Wisconsin Pres, 2022.
