= Michèle Alfa =

French actress (1911–1987)

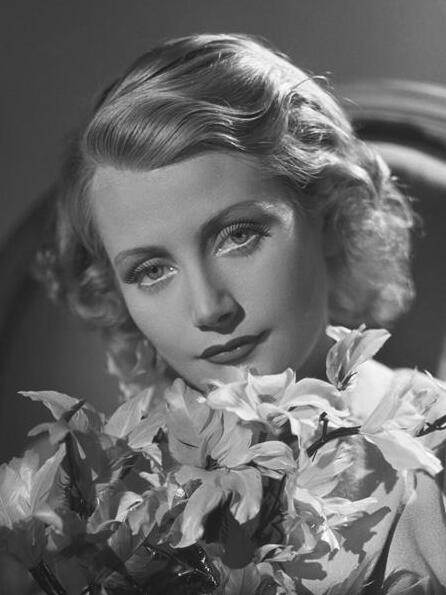
- Alfa in 1939
- Born: Joséphine Blanche Alfreda Bassignot; August 20, 1911; Gujan-Mestras, Gironde, France
- Died: August 24, 1987 (aged 76); Le Vésinet, Yvelines, France
- Occupation: Actress
- Years active: 1932–1952

Michèle Alfa (born Joséphine Blanche Alfreda Bassignot; August 20, 1911 – August 24, 1987) was a French stage and film actress. After appearing mainly in supporting roles during the 1930s she starred in a number of films during the 1940s.

During the German occupation of France she became the lover of German officer Bernhardt Rademecker, who was the nephew of Joseph Goebbels, the Reich Minister of Propaganda, while Rademecker was stationed in Paris. She used her influence to secure the release of fellow actor Charles de Rochefort from an internment camp. She also hid leaders of the French Resistance.

== Selected filmography ==
- The Beautiful Adventure (1932)
- Ramuntcho (1938)
- Lights of Paris (1938)
- Peace on the Rhine (1938)
- Adrienne Lecouvreur (1938)
- Le Corsaire (1939)
- Prince Bouboule (1939)
- The Pavilion Burns (1941)
- The Last of the Six (1941)
- The Woman I Loved Most (1942)
- Le Lit à colonnes (1942)
- The Snow on the Footsteps (1942)
- Home Port (1943)
- The Secret of Madame Clapain (1943)
- Jeannou (1943)
- The Man Who Sold His Soul (1943)
- The Count of Monte Cristo (1943)
- The Secret of Madame Clapain (1944)
- Chinese Quarter (1947)
- Dark Sunday (1948)
- Judicial Error (1948)
- The Winner's Circle (1950)
- Matrimonial Agency (1952)

== Bibliography ==
- Riding, Alan. And the Show Went On. Gerald Duckworth, 2011.
