= Henry Bordeaux =

French novelist and lawyer

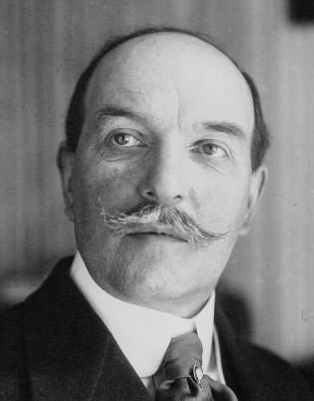
- Henry Bordeaux in 1919
- Born: 25 January 1870; Thonon-les-Bains, Haute-Savoie, France
- Died: 29 March 1963 (aged 93); Paris, France
- Occupations: Writer, lawyer

Henry Bordeaux (French pronunciation: [ɑ̃ʁi bɔʁdo]; 25 January 1870 – 29 March 1963) was a French writer and lawyer.

Bordeaux came from a family of lawyers of Savoy. He was born in Thonon-les-Bains, Haute-Savoie. His grandfather was a magistrate and his father served on the Chambéry bar. During his early life, he relocated between Savoy and Paris and the tensions between provincial and city life influenced his writings. In his professional life he observed closely the dissolution of numerous families and analysed the causes and consequences of these. From the age of seventeen he spent three years in Paris studying law. Then he returned to practice law in Savoy. He returned to Paris after the publication of his first book during 1894. When his father died in 1896 he returned to Savoy.

The writings of Bordeaux reflect the values of traditional provincial Catholic communities. One recurring theme is loyalty. Loyalty is pervasive, and it applies to family, country and God. This theme is particularly evidenced in the novels "La Peur de vivre" and "Les Roquevillard."

Bordeaux was elected to the Académie française on 22 May 1919. This elite group of writers, popularly known as the "immortals," are responsible for establishing and maintaining the grammar, usage and acceptance of vocabulary into standard French.

He was a contributor to Le Visage de l'Italie, a 1929 book about Italy prefaced by Benito Mussolini.

Bordeaux died in Paris in 1963.

== Popular culture ==
Henry Miller makes fun of Bordeaux in Tropic of Cancer. "I have yet to meet a whore who doesn't know of Henry Bordeaux! . . . It seemed to me that I heard her say, 'quand il n'y aura plus de temps.' It sounded like that anyway. In the state I was in, a phrase like that was worth a hundred francs. I wondered if it was her own or if she had pulled it from Henry Bordeaux."

== Bibliography ==
- Le Pays natal (1900)
- La Peur de vivre (1902)
- La Petite mademoiselle (1905)
- Les Roquevillard (1906)
- Les Yeux qui s’ouvrent (1907); in English The Awakening (1914) and A Mind Awakened (1915)
- La Croisée des chemins (1909)
- La Robe de laine (1910)
- La Neige sur les pas (1911)
- La Maison (1913)
- Le Chevalier de l'air : Vie héroïque de Guynemer, Plon (1918)
- La Résurrection de la chair (1920)
- Yamilé sous les cèdres (1923)
- La Chartreuse du Reposoir (1924)
- Le Cœur et le sang (1925)
- Le Bouquet Rouge (1926)
- La Revenante (1932)
- Le Cœur de la Reine Hortense (1933)
