= Manon of the Spring (1952 film) =

1952 two-part French drama film by Marcel Pagnol

- Theatrical release poster
- Directed by: Marcel Pagnol
- Written by: Marcel Pagnol
- Produced by: Marcel Pagnol
- Starring: Jacqueline Pagnol; Raymond Pellegrin; Rellys
- Cinematography: Willy Faktorovitch
- Edited by: Jacques Bianchi; Raymonde Bianchi
- Music by: Raymond Legrand
- Production company: La Société Nouvelle des Films Marcel Pagnol
- Distributed by: Gaumont Distribution
- Release date: 16 December 1952
- Running time: 235 minutes
- Country: France
- Language: French

Manon of the Spring (French: Manon des sources, pronounced [manɔ̃ de suʁs]) is a 1952 French two-part drama film directed by Marcel Pagnol and starring Jacqueline Pagnol, Raymond Pellegrin and Rellys. The diptych and the first film are both titled Manon of the Spring, while the second film is titled Ugolin. Marcel Pagnol conceived the film specifically as a vehicle for his wife Jacqueline to star in.

The titular protagonist is a young woman who lives in rural Provence, near a village where she is considered an outsider. As the story unfolds, it gradually reveals how Manon is taking her revenge on the man who tricked her parents out of their property and on the community who let that happen.

Ten years later, Pagnol adapted and expanded the story into the two-volume novel The Water of the Hills. The complete saga was adapted in 1986 as the films Jean de Florette and Manon of the Spring.

== Plot ==
=== Part one: Manon of the Spring ===
In a small Provençal village, gendarmes search for Manon, a young woman who lives with her ailing mother in the hills, scraping out a living through goat herding and poaching. The Mayor and a group of locals explain her history to the newly arrived schoolteacher. Manon is the daughter of a hunchbacked farmer who died two years earlier. She is nicknamed "Manon of the Springs" after her father, who used a dowsing rod in a futile search for water to irrigate his land.

The hunchback was considered an outsider, even though his mother, Florette, was a local woman who had married into a neighboring village. Her son eventually returned after inheriting his uncle's farm. Several villagers remark that the hunchback suffered an injustice—one that might have been avoided had they realized he was Florette's son and, therefore, one of their own. However, Le Papet ("the grandfather"), a surly elder who had unsuccessfully courted Florette in his youth, argues that her marriage to a stranger revoked her village status and caused her son’s deformity. After the hunchback's death, his land was bought by Ugolin, a local farmer. Meanwhile, local women dislike Manon, even accusing her of witchcraft.

Up in the hills, Manon meets her friend Baptistine, an old woman cursing the village because her husband's grave was relocated for administrative reasons. Soon after, Manon is arrested and brought to the village, accused of wounding a young man named Polyte and stealing melons from Ugolin's farm. To determine if charges can be filed, the chief gendarme improvises an informal, public trial. The schoolteacher stands up for Manon, calling her a victim of bigotry and superstition. Manon explains that Polyte attempted to sexually assault her and that she merely defended herself. Ugolin also speaks in her defense, claiming he gave her the melons willingly, and Manon is set free.

As the villagers prepare for the feast of the fountain, Manon returns to the hills. There, she reunites with Baptistine, who shows her how to exact her revenge, telling her, “Now that you have seen, do whatever you want!” Manon later befriends the schoolteacher. During their conversation, she expresses dislike for the villagers and recalls how, during her childhood, her family had to walk miles every day just to fetch water for their crops. She notes that Ugolin bought the farm after her father's death and immediately found a spring on the land. When Manon mentions Baptistine's curse, the schoolteacher scoffs, but she implies that a catastrophe could befall the village.

Shortly after leaving the schoolteacher, Manon encounters Ugolin in the hills. After an awkward opening conversation, Ugolin confesses his love for her. She rebuffs him and walks away, while he continues to shout his professions of love, promising her everything he owns and mentioning his inheritance from his uncle, Le Papet. As she departs, she jokes that he would look handsomer without his mustache—a comment he takes seriously. Later, Manon emerges from a crevice in a steep hillside carrying tools and a pickaxe.The next day, Manon returns to the village just as the feast of the fountain begins. Ugolin is there, having shaved his mustache. Suddenly, the fountain stops flowing; the spring that supplies the entire village has dried up. Faced with the sudden loss of water for themselves and their farms, the villagers begin to panic.

=== Part two: Ugolin ===
A water engineer tries to determine why the spring dried up but finds no clues. He advises the villagers to rely on a water tanker or abandon the village entirely. Later, up in the hills, Manon observes Ugolin praying before a statue of the Virgin Mary, begging for the water's return and admitting to an evil deed.

The next day during Mass, the priest suggests the village is facing divine punishment for a hidden sin. Among the audience, Ugolin listens uncomfortably. Declaring that those who tolerate an injustice are as guilty as the perpetrator, the priest urges everyone to examine their consciences and announces a procession in honor of Saint Dominic to pray for water. Afterward, the schoolteacher reminds Manon of her prediction of a disaster. She replies, "You know very well that I'm a bit of a witch," and mentions that she plans to leave the village. He asks her to come to the meeting that will be held at his home.

That afternoon, a group of villagers gathers in the schoolteacher's garden to discuss the crisis, quickly pointing suspicion toward Ugolin. Manon joins them and openly accuses him. While Ugolin denies any wrongdoing, several men admit the village had always suspected he tricked the hunchback; only Le Papet defends his nephew. Manon then reveals that Ugolin plugged the only spring on her family's farm, forcing her father into a debt that ultimately cost him his land. Though Ugolin claims he merely loaned the money to help, a younger villager named Eliacin corroborates Manon's story, recalling how he saw Ugolin plug the spring with stolen cement.

Manon details how the village's silence drove her family to ruin: her brother, Paul, died from drinking contaminated cistern water, her father died of heartbreak, and her mother lost her sanity. Without confessing outright, Ugolin implies that he has been tortured for years by remorse, and that he wants to give everything back to Manon by marrying her. He kneels to profess his love for Manon; she rejects him in disgust. As everyone turns against him, Ugolin keeps protesting his innocence; when asked to swear on the Gospel, he refuses, then flees in disgrace.

A delirious Ugolin wanders through the hills, haunted by visions of the hunchback and his family carrying water for their farm. Meanwhile, the villagers decide to visit Ugolin to formalize the restitution of the property to Manon. Upon arriving at his home, they discover a written confession, followed by Ugolin himself, who has committed suicide by hanging. The villagers then visit Manon to inform her of Ugolin's death and to explain that he bequeathed the farm to her in his will. They invite her to attend the upcoming procession. Afterward, the schoolteacher speaks with Manon, persuading her to abandon her vengeance against the community. Together, they go to the hillside crevice and unplug the spring.

The next day, during the procession, the fountain begins flowing once more. The priest praises the Lord for the miracle. Later, Manon sells Ugolin's remaining carnation harvest to another farmer. Realizing the farm will bring her financial independence, she discusses her future with the schoolteacher, sharing her plans to use the money to care for her mother and build a proper tomb for her father. Their conversation is interrupted by the Mayor, who arrives to propose that the village renovate the old presbytery for her to live in, though he quickly departs upon realizing he is intruding. Left alone again, the schoolteacher declares his love to Manon.

== Cast ==
- Jacqueline Pagnol as Manon
- Raymond Pellegrin as the schoolteacher
- Rellys as Ugolin
- Henri Vilbert as the parish priest
- Fernand Sardou as Philoxène, the Mayor
- Henri Poupon as Le Papet
- Robert Vattier as Mr Belloiseau
- Jean Panisse as Eliacin
- Annie Roudier as Schoolteacher's mother
- Edmond Ardisson as Ange, the fountaineer
- Henri Arius as Claudius, the butcher
- André Bervil as Anatole, the baker
- Charles Blavette as Pamphile, the carpenter
- Jean-Marie Bon as Cabridan
- Marguerite Chabert as Polyte's mother
- Luce Dassas as Ange's wife
- Daxely as Josias, brother of Jonas
- Del Bosco as Jonas, brother of Josias
- Édouard Delmont as Anglade
- Alfred Goulin as Jean, the hunchback
- Marcelle Géniat as Baptistine
- Jenny Hélia as Aricie, Cabridan's wife
- Christian Lude as engineer
- Julien Maffre as Pétugue, the blacksmith
- Jeanne Mars as Nathalie
- Marthe Marty as Sidonie
- Milly Mathis as Amélie, the carpenter's wife
- René Sarvil as Brigadeer
- Jean Toscan as Polyte
- Andrée Turcy as butcher's wife
- Jacques Valois as Bauxites director
- Yvonne Gamy as Elodie

== Production ==
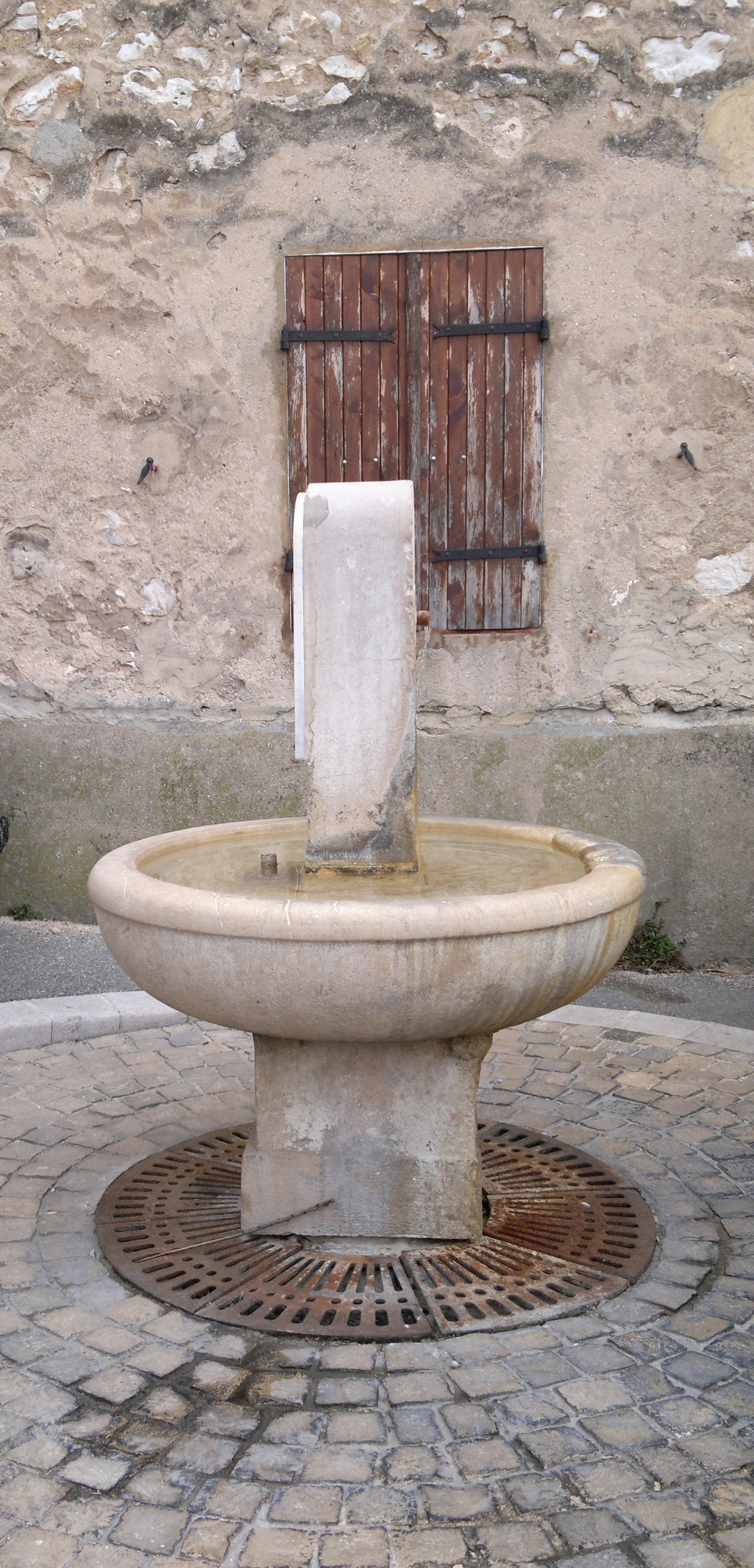
The fountain in La Treille, Marseille, which is featured in several key scenes.

Manon of the Spring was conceived by Marcel Pagnol as a "gift" for his wife, actress Jacqueline Pagnol, whom he had married in 1945 and who had starred in his three previous films, Naïs, The Pretty Miller Girl and Topaze. The latter film had been Pagnol's biggest post-war box-office success, granting him greater freedom on his next projects.

Pagnol based his script on an allegedly true story he had been told as a child, about a young woman who had taken revenge on those who had appropriated her father's farm. Depending on the versions, the story involved a spring. Pagnol also drew some inspiration from the memories of Jacqueline, who had herded goats as a child.

Pagnol wished to cast his frequent collaborator Fernandel, then one of France's biggest stars, as Ugolin, but the actor, who had just made several films in a row and was busy with other projects, turned down the role. Pagnol was so displeased by Fernandel's refusal that the two men remained at odds for several years. Pagnol considered casting Fernandel's brother, Fransined, but ultimately settled for Rellys.

Filming started in June 1952; it took place at Marseille Studios and on location around La Treille and Aubagne. The film's sets were designed by the art director Eugène Delfau. Shooting took place during a particularly hot summer. To stay in the atmosphere of the film, Pagnol and his wife resided in a house in La Treille throughout the production. Rellys stayed in the same house, allowing Pagnol to explain him his role in detail.

The fountain appearing in several pivotal scenes, situated on place Maurice Thouvenin in La Treille, is now commonly called fontaine Manon des sources (Manon of the Spring fountain).

== Release and reception ==
Pagnol's first cut lasted six hours. It was later reduced to four hours, as Pagnol considered that there was enough material for two 2-hour films. At the request of distributor Gaumont, Pagnol further reduced the cut to three hours. The film premiered in Nice in December 1952. It was well received by audiences, though critical reception was mixed. When the film received a general theatrical release in January 1953, Jean de Baroncelli of Le Monde argued that, at three hours, it was still too long. Again at Gaumont's request, Pagnol made a shorter, 90-minute version of the film.

The film was a commercial success upon release, selling 4,2 million admissions and ranking 9th at the box-office for 1953.

Film historian Colin Crisp later called Manon of the Spring "one of the great triumphs of naive filmmaking, picking up on and continuing Marcel Pagnol’s great prewar films". However, he found Jacqueline Pagnol's performance in the title role to be the film's weakest point, noting that the actress was also "too exquisitely made-up (combed hair, plucked eyebrows, lipstick) to convince as a rustic goatherd, let alone as a representative of nature".

In 1968, Pagnol made the film's 4-hour version widely available by re-editing it as a television miniseries consisting of 18 episodes of 15 minutes each.

== Retelling as a novel and remake ==
Feeling the need to expand the film's story, Pagnol decided to adapt his script into a novel which would also tell the story of Jean, the hunchback. The two-part book, titled The Water of the Hills (L'Eau des collines), was published ten years after the release of the original film, with the first volume, Jean de Florette, functioning as a "prequel" to the film. The second volume, Manon des sources, retold the film's story with several differences in terms of structure and plot elements. Le Papet was made a much more central character in the novel, where he played a leading role in the scheming against Jean; Pagnol notably added a final plot twist in which Le Papet discovers that Jean was his biological son. In 1986, the novel was adapted into a new two-part film directed by Claude Berri, Jean de Florette and Manon of the Spring.

== Home media ==
The four-hour version of Manon of the Spring was released on DVD in 2007. In 2023, it was released on Blu-ray, in a restored 4K version supervised by Marcel Pagnol's grandson Nicolas. It was also released on VOD on several streaming services including Pathé Home, Canal+ and Arte.

== Sources ==
- Crisp, C. G. (2015). French cinema : a critical filmography. Volume 1, 1929-1939. Bloomington: Indiana University Press. ISBN 978-0-253-01703-1. JSTOR j.ctt16gz9x6. OCLC 911179668.
- Hayward, Susan (2016). "Middlebrow Taste". In Faulkner, Sally (ed.). Middlebrow cinema. London: Routledge, Taylor and Francis Group. ISBN 978-1-315-63056-4. OCLC 945771729 – via Open Research Library.
