= The Most Wanted Man =

1953 film by Henri Verneuil

- Directed by: Henri Verneuil
- Written by: Michel Audiard; Jean Manse; Max Favalelli
- Produced by: Jacques Bar
- Starring: Fernandel; Zsa Zsa Gabor; Louis Seigner
- Cinematography: Armand Thirard
- Edited by: Christian Gaudin
- Music by: Raymond Legrand; Nino Rota
- Production companies: Cité Films; Fidès; Cocinor; Peg Produzione
- Distributed by: Cocinor
- Release date: 25 December 1953
- Running time: 105 minutes
- Countries: France; Italy
- Language: French

The Most Wanted Man or Public Enemy Number One (French: L'ennemi public n° 1, Italian: Il nemico pubblico n° 1) is a 1953 French-Italian comedy film directed by Henri Verneuil and starring Fernandel, Zsa Zsa Gabor and Louis Seigner. It was shot at Cinecittà Studios in Rome. The film's sets were designed by the art director Robert Giordani. It was one of many co-productions between the France and Italy during the postwar era.

== Synopsis ==
An ordinary American man is mistaken for a public enemy number one after he puts on a gangster's coat. Only with the help of the real gangster's girlfriend, Lola, is he able to bring the criminal to justice and clear his own name.

== Cast ==
- Fernandel as Joe Calvet
- Zsa Zsa Gabor as Lola la Blonde
- Louis Seigner as Le directeur de la prison
- David Opatoshu as Slim le Tueur
- Nicole Maurey as Peggy
- Alfred Adam as Le shérif
- Jean Marchat as L'attorney general
- Saturnin Fabre as W.W. Stone, l’avocat
- Paolo Stoppa as Teddy « Tony » Fallone
- Tino Buazzelli as Parker
- Carlo Ninchi as Nick le Flicard
- Guglielmo Barnabò as M Click
- Arturo Bragaglia as Jack le Caissier
- Paul Barge as Le gardien-chef
- Michel Ardan as Un Inspecteur
- Jess Hahn as Walter le Vicieux, un truand
- André Dalibert as Un surveillant
- Bob Ingarao as Le chef de la police
- Manuel Gary as Charly

== Bibliography ==
- Higbee, Will & Leahy, Sarah. Studies in French Cinema: UK perspectives, 1985-2010. Intellect Books, 27 2014.
