= Topaze (play) =

Topaze is a 1928 comedy play in four acts by the French writer Marcel Pagnol. It tells the story of a modest school teacher who is fired for being too honest and decides to become a dishonest businessman. The play premiered on 9 October 1928 at the Théâtre des Variétés. It was performed on Broadway in 1930 with Frank Morgan in the title role.

== Summary ==
=== Act 1 ===
Topaze is a teacher at a boarding school, deeply in love with his fellow teacher Ernestine. Ernestine, the daughter of the school principal Mr. Muche, takes advantage of him, making him do her paperwork and watch her students, but Topaze naively takes this to be a mark of affection and asks his friend Tamise, another teacher, to quietly see if Mr. Muche would let Ernestine marry. In the meantime, a young woman named Suzy Courtois arrives; she is the aunt of a private student of Topaze and intends to enroll the child at the school, but she changes her mind after visiting.

Topaze is asked to change the report card of a wealthy student to improve the student's grades, as the student is the son of a baroness. Truthful Topaze refuses despite M. Muche's insistences, making the principal angry. Tamise unwittingly reveals Topaze's intent to marry Ernestine. This is the last straw for Mr. Muche and he fires Topaze.

=== Act 2 ===
Topaze is giving a lesson to his private pupil at Suzy's house. Suzy, beneath her spotless exterior, has a secret: she is the mistress of Régis Castel-Benac, a municipal counsellor who uses his office to engage in shady but lucrative business deals which have enriched not only himself but Suzy. Roger, Castel-Benac's frontman, wants a bigger share of the profits, but Castel-Benac refuses. Suzy proposes using Topaze to get around Roger, and along with Castel-Benac successfully convinces Topaze to become the director of a brand-new office regulating business and then to sign some documents in place of Castel-Benac. When Roger reveals the nature of the business dealings to Topaze, Suzy quickly steps in and keeps Topaze from denouncing them by claiming that Castel-Benac has forced her to go along. Topaze keeps his silence, convinced that he must do so to "save" Suzy.

=== Act 3 ===
Topaze is now the director of a business firm, but his "good luck" doesn't make him happy; he is tormented by his conscience and constantly fears arrest, and he has discovered that Suzy is Castel-Benac's accomplice and mistress as opposed to victim. He confessed his love to Suzy, but she now sees him as merely a friend. He spurns Ernestine and Mr. Muche in favor of Suzy, and continues to work as Castel-Benac's frontman despite knowing the truth.

=== Act 4 ===
Suzy is angry at Castel-Benac for keeping her out of his new business, a move which he denies. For once he is telling the truth; this venture was launched by Topaze, who is now an elegant and confident businessman and who announces to Castel-Benac that he will now work alone on his ventures. Castel-Benac has no recourse against his former frontman. Suzy also splits with Castel-Benac to become mistress to Topaze.

Tamise has stayed an honest professor. When he visits Topaze he is at first horrified by how money has corrupted his old friend, but he does not refuse when Topaze offers him a job.

== Film adaptations ==
The play has been adapted for film multiple times, most notably in 1933 with John Barrymore in the title role.

- Topaze (1933), French film directed by Louis J. Gasnier, starring Louis Jouvet
- Topaze (1933), American film directed by Harry d'Abbadie d'Arrast, starring John Barrymore
- Yacout Effendi (1933), Egyptian film directed by Nagib El-Rihani
- Topaze (1936), French film directed by Marcel Pagnol, starring Arnaudy
- Jinyin Shijie (金銀世界, The World of Money) (1939), Chinese film directed by Li Pingqian
- Topaze (1951), French film directed by Marcel Pagnol, starring Fernandel
- Topaze (1956), French film directed by Jean Kerchbron
- Mr. Topaze (1961), British film directed by Peter Sellers, starring Sellers
- Topaze (1963), Swedish television film directed by Jan Molander
- Topaze (1966) Australian TV film
- Sang Guru (1981), Indonesia film directed by Edward Sirait
