= Nina Myral =

French actress (1884–1975)

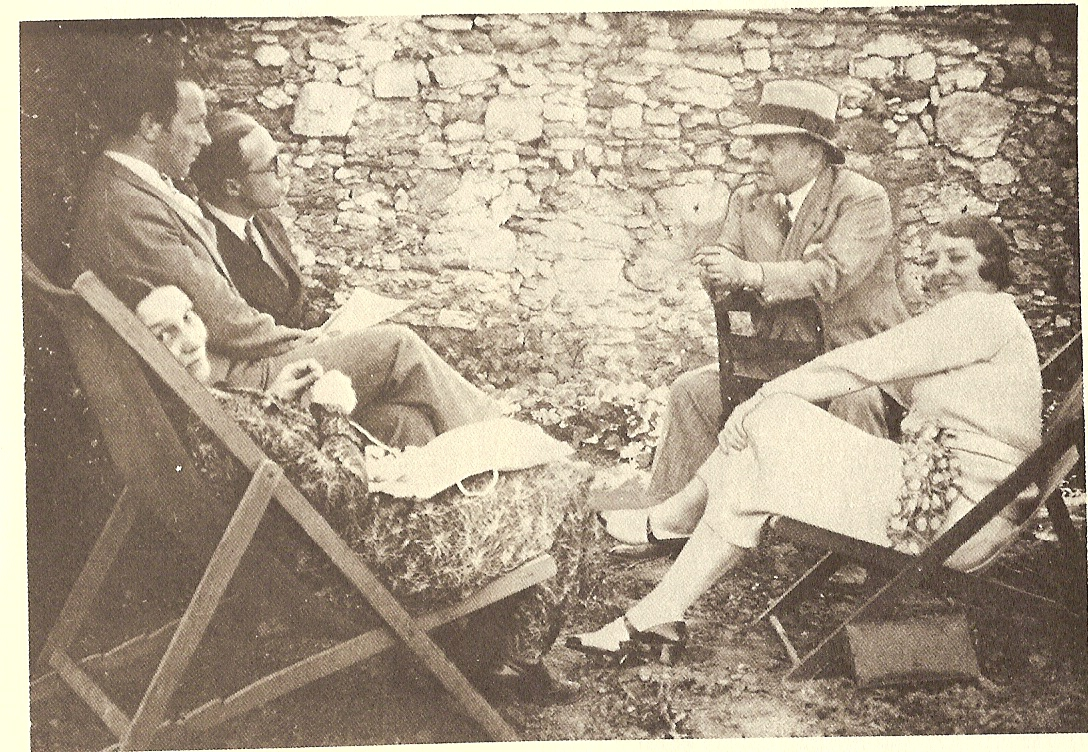
- Robert Burnier, Pierre Vellones both left and René Milan in hat. In the foreground,, Marie-Louise Casadesus and Nina Myral.
- Born: Eugénie, Hortense Gruel; 26 June 1884; 10th arrondissement of Paris
- Died: 30 March 1975 (aged 90); Draveil
- Occupations: Actress; Dancer; Singer

Nina Myral, stage name of Eugénie, Hortense Gruel, (26 June 1884 – 30 March 1975) was a 20th-century French actress, dancer and singer.

== Filmography ==
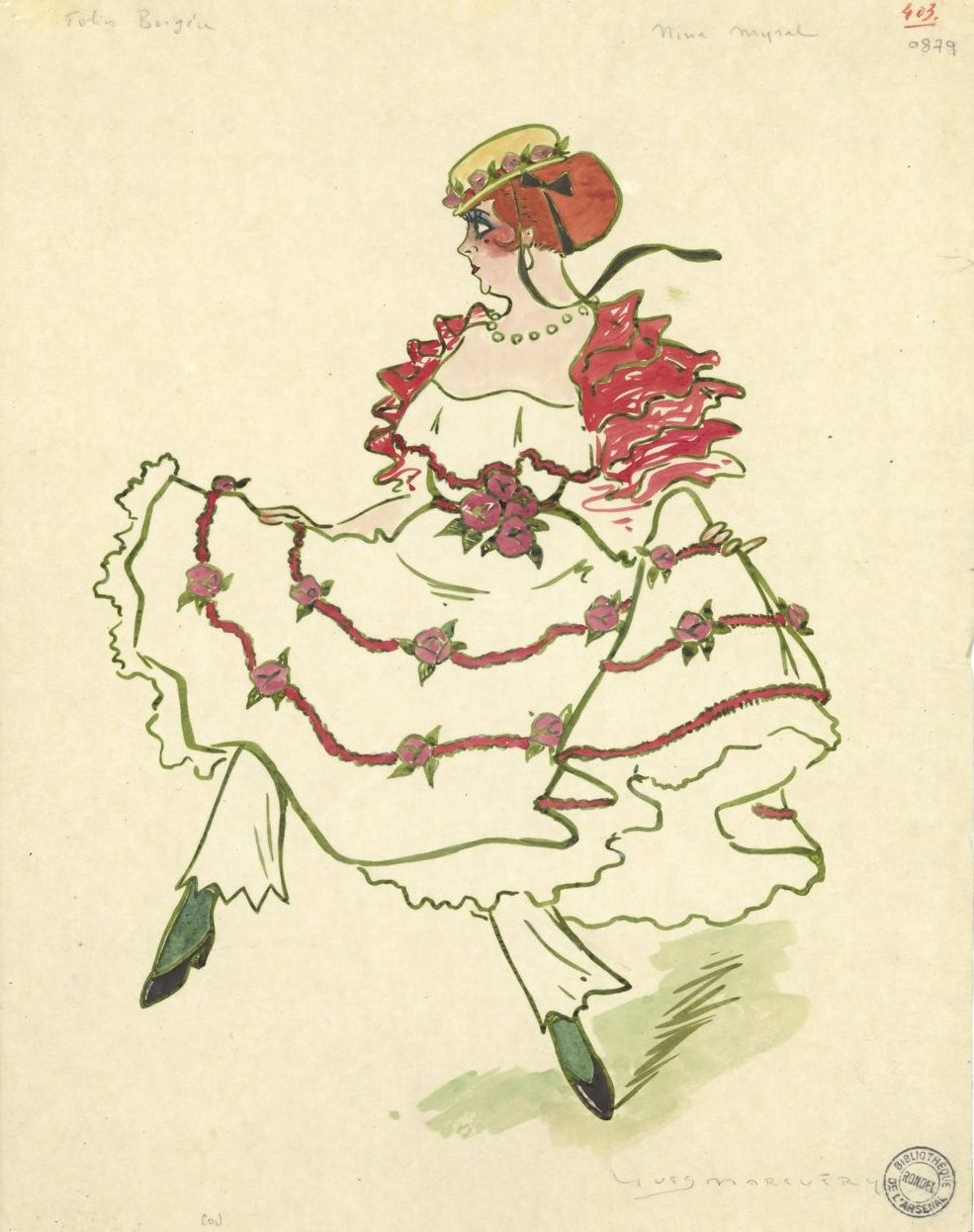
Nina Myral in a revue at the Folies Bergère, drawing by Yves Marevéry (1913)

- 1916: Paris pendant la guerre by Henri Diamant-Berger
- 1917: Ils y viennent tous au cinéma by Henri Diamant-Berger
- 1923: Gonzague by Henri Diamant-Berger : Pierrette
- 1922: Le Mauvais Garçon by Henri Diamant-Berger: La bonne
- 1931: Coiffeur pour dames by René Guissart : Mme Dupetit-Flageot
- 1931: L'Indéfrisable by Jean de Marguenat, short film
- 1932: Les Bleus de l'amour by Jean de Marguenat - La comtesse
- 1932: Histoire de rire by Jean Boyer (short film) : La vieille cuisinière
- 1932: Je vois ça d'ici / Un coup de téléphone by Jean Caret - short film
- 1932: Quand monsieur voudra by Jean Marguerite - short film
- 1932: La Saisie by Jean Marguerite, short film
- 1933: Coralie and Company by Alberto Cavalcanti - La tante Laure
- 1933: A Man Has Been Stolen by Max Ophüls - La vieille dame
- 1933: L'Accordeur by Henri Diamant-Berger, short film
- 1934: Nous ne sommes plus des enfants by Augusto Genina
- 1934: Le Prince Jean by Jean de Marguenat - Mme de Grivelles
- 1935: Martha by Karl Anton - La duchesse
- 1936: L'Ange du foyer by Léon Mathot - Miss Watson
- 1937: Le Fauteuil 47 by Fernand Rivers - Arsinöé, l'habilleuse
- 1937: Maman Colibri by Jean Dréville - Mme de Saint-Puy
- 1937: Le Compositeur du dessus by Paul Mesnier, short film
- 1938: Sirocco by Pierre Chenal - L'épouse du collectionneur
- 1938: Ma sœur de lait by Jean Boyer - Mlle Estève, la gouvernante
- 1938: The President by Fernand Rivers - Sophie
- 1938: Visages de femmes by René Guissart - Mme Legrand
- 1939: Marseille mes amours by Jacques Daniel-Norman - Tante Anna
- 1940: They Were Twelve Women by Georges Lacombe - La bonne
- 1941: White Patrol by Christian Chamborant - Mme Galvin
- 1941: Moulin Rouge by André Hugon - La concierge
- 1941: The Master Valet by Paul Mesnier - Agathe
- 1945: We Are Not Married by Bernard-Roland
- 1945: Her Final Role by Jean Gourguet
- 1946: Le Charcutier de Machonville by Vicky Ivernel - La marquise
- 1946: La Kermesse rouge by Paul Mesnier - Éléonore de Saint-Aubin
- 1948: The Cupboard Was Bare by Carlo Rim - La première commère
- 1948: The Ladies in the Green Hats by Fernand Rivers - Mlle de Valencourt
- 1948: City of Hope by Jean Stelli - Mme Euridipe
- 1948: Jo la Romance by Gilles Grangier - Mamita
- 1949: The Atomic Monsieur Placido by Robert Hennion - La vieille dame
- 1949: At the Grand Balcony by Henri Decoin - Mme Viard
- 1949: Wedding Night by René Jayet - La présidente
- 1949: Ronde de nuit by François Campaux - Une concierge
- 1950: A Hole in the Wall by Émile Couzinet - La concierge
- 1950: Justice Is Done by André Cayatte - La mère de béatrice
- 1950: Mr. Peek-a-Boo by Jean Boyer - Mme Eloïse
- 1950: The Prize by Jean Boyer - Mme de Goudreville
- 1953: Carnaval by Henri Verneuil - La présidente des filles repenties
- 1954: The Sheep Has Five Legs by Henri Verneuil - Justine, la bonne des Durand-Perrin
- 1955: The French, They Are a Funny Race by Preston Sturges
- 1955: People of No Importance by Henri Verneuil - Une employée chez Barchandeau
- 1955: Je suis un sentimental by John Berry - La malade dans la chambre d’hôpital
- 1955: Quatre jours à Paris by André Berthomieu - L'habilleuse
- 1956: Mademoiselle et son gang by Jean Boyer - La bourgeoise qui emploie Agnès comme nurse
- 1956: Nous autres à Champignol by Jean Bastia - Mlle Tintoret
- 1956: La Terreur des dames ou Ce cochon de Morin by Jean Boyer
- 1957: Sénéchal le magnifique by Jean Boyer - La souffleuse au théâtre
- 1960: Boulevard by Julien Duvivier
- 1962: The Devil and the Ten Commandments by Julien Duvivier - Une paroissienne, in the sketch: "Dieu en vain ne jureras"
- 1963: That Man from Rio by Philippe de Broca

== Theatre ==
- 1905: Tom Pitt, le roi des pickpockets by Victor de Cottens and Victor Darlay, Théâtre du Châtelet
- 1936: Le Guéridon Empire by Rip, directed by Edmond Roze, Comédie des Champs-Élysées
