= Panisse =

Panisse may refer to:

- Panisse, a French variation of farinata made from chickpea flour
- Chez Panisse, the Californian restaurant
- Jean Panisse (1928–2021), a French actor
- Honoré Panisse, a character from the French theatre trilogy La Trilogie Marseillaise (Marius, Fanny, César) and its adaptations.
