= Pagnol (disambiguation) =

Marcel Pagnol (1895 – 1974) was a French writer.

Pagnol may also refer to:

- Lycée Français International Marcel Pagnol (disambiguation), French international schools
- Jacqueline Pagnol (née Bouvier, 1926), French actress and second wife of Marcel Pagnol
- The asteroid 10306 Pagnol
