= Girl and the River =

1958 film

- Directed by: François Villiers
- Written by: Alain Allioux; Jean Giono
- Produced by: Claude Clert
- Starring: Pascale Audret
- Cinematography: Paul Soulignac
- Edited by: Edouard Berne
- Music by: Guy Béart
- Distributed by: Gaumont Distribution
- Release date: May 1958
- Running time: 96 minutes
- Country: France
- Language: French

Girl and the River (French: L'Eau vive, lit. 'Living Water') is a 1958 French drama film directed by François Villiers. It was entered into the 1958 Cannes Film Festival.

== Cast ==
In alphabetical order by surname

- Henri Arius - The uncle from Cavaillon
- Pascale Audret - Hortense
- Odette Barencey - Joséphine
- Charles Blavette - L'oncle Simon
- Jean Clarens - Le notaire
- Andrée Debar - The cousin from Rochebrune
- Hubert de Lapparent - Elie, a peasant
- Hélène Gerber - La femme d'Elie
- Jean Giono - Le récitant (voice)
- Harry-Max - Le juge de paix
- Germaine Kerjean - The aunt from Rochebrune
- Robert Lombard - Le cousin de Rochebrune
- Milly Mathis - The aunt from Cavaillon
- Pierre Moncorbier - L'oncle vigneron
- Jean Panisse - The butcher
- Maurice Sarfati - The cousin from Cavaillon
- Dany Saval
- Jean-Marie Serreau - Le Jéhovah de Perthuis
- Madeleine Sylvain - La bouchère
- Arlette Thomas - La femme de Dabisse

== Reception ==
Jean-Luc Godard considered it the best French film of 1958.
