= Raymond Pellegrin =

French actor

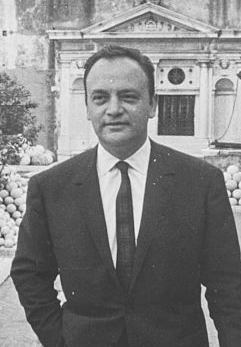
Pellegrin in 1962

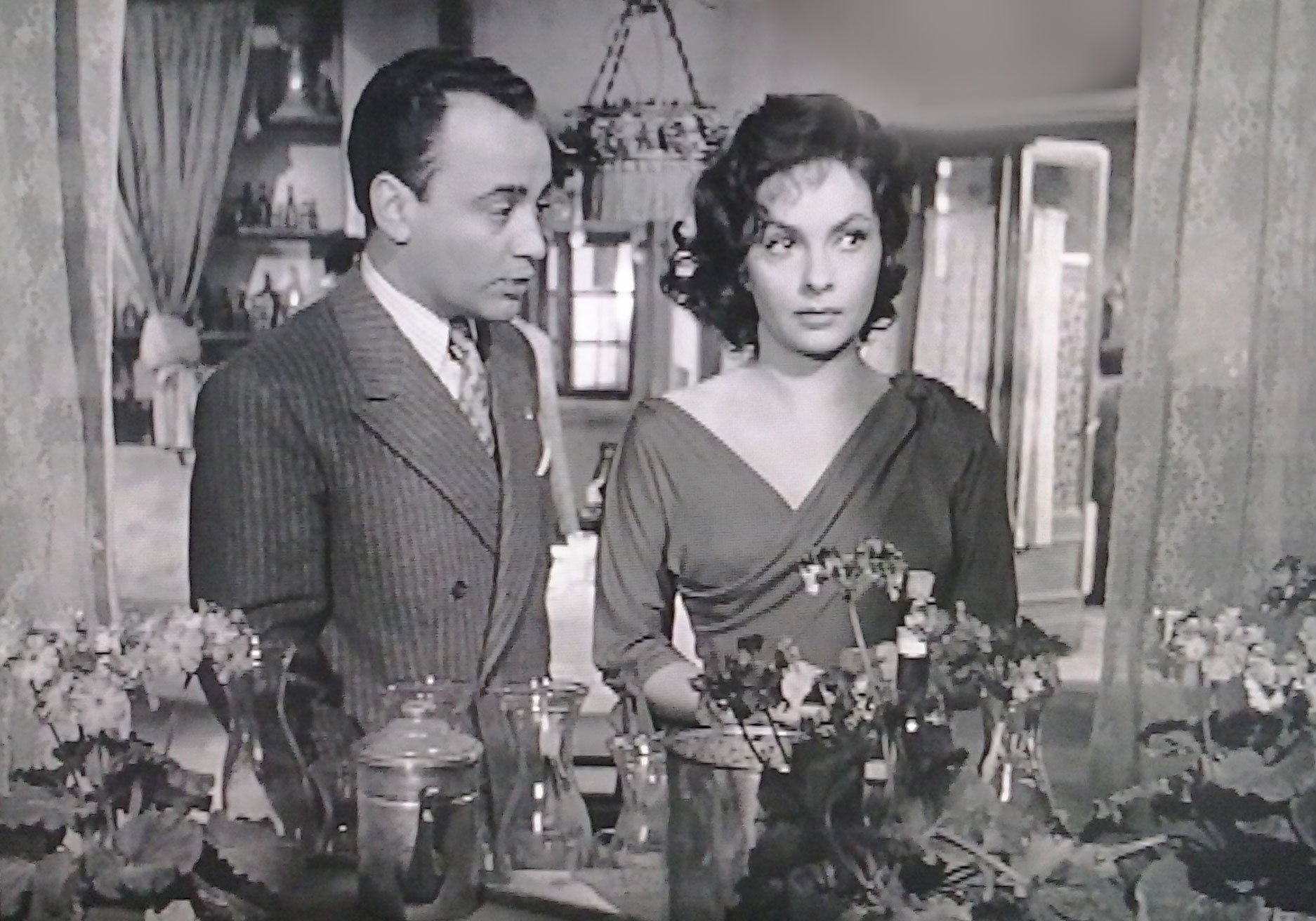
Raymond Pellegrin and Gina Lollobrigida

Raymond Pellegrin (1 January 1925 – 14 October 2007) was a French actor.

Born in Nice, Pellegrin made his screen debut in the 1945 French feature Naïs.

He was also famous in France for dubbing Jean Marais for the voice of Fantômas in the eponymous film trilogy.

He married actress Dora Doll on 12 July 1949; the couple had a daughter named Danielle, and divorced in 1955. He married actress Gisèle Pascal on 8 October 1955; on 12 September 1962, the couple had a daughter, Pascale Pellegrin, now also an actress.

In his films, he is sometimes credited as "Raymond Pellegrini." He died in Garons.

== Filmography ==
- Six petites filles en blanc (1943) .... Un jeune homme
- Marie la Misère (1945) .... Georges
- Naïs (1945) .... Frédéric
- Jericho (1946) .... Pierre, le fils du pharmacien
- La femme en rouge (1947) .... Jean Talais
- A Cop (1947) .... Georges Monnier
- Le Diamant de cent sous (1948) .... Tony
- Guilty? (1951) .... Noël Portal
- The Billionaire Tramp (1951) .... Henri Laplanche
- The Smugglers' Banquet (1952) .... Michel Demeuse
- We Are All Murderers (1952) .... Gino Bollini
- Three Women (1952) .... Julien (segment "Mouche")
- Forbidden Fruit (1952) .... Octave
- Manon of the Spring (1952) .... L'instituteur
- Midnight Witness (1953) .... Roger Noël
- Les Compagnes de la nuit (1953) .... Jo Verdier
- Tempest in the Flesh (1954) .... Antonio 'Tonio' Borelli
- Les Intrigantes (1954) .... Andrieux
- Flesh and the Woman (1954) .... Mario
- Women Without Hope (1954) .... René
- Le Feu dans la peau (1954) .... Célestin Rabou
- Woman of Rome (1954) .... Astarita
- Les Impures (1954) .... Mario
- Napoléon (1955) .... Napoléon Bonaparte - vieux
- The Hotshot (1955) .... Philippe
- Men in White (1955) .... Dr. Jean Nérac
- Blackmail (1955) .... Jean-Louis Labouret
- The Light Across the Street (1955) .... Georges Marceau
- Law of the Streets (1956) .... Jo le Grec
- Burning Fuse (1957) .... Ludovic 'Ludo' Ferrier
- Until the Last One (1957) .... Fernand Bastia
- Vacances explosives (1957) .... L'homme dans le placard du Coq Hardi (uncredited)
- Bitter Victory (1957) .... Mekrane
- La Bonne Tisane (1958) .... Dr. Augereau
- Mimi Pinson (1958) .... Frédéric de Montazel
- It Only Happens to the Living (1959) .... Henri Brunier
- Secret professionnel (1959) .... Dr. André Foucaud
- El casco blanco (1959)
- Chien de pique (1960) .... Robert
- The Mishap (1961) .... Serizeilles
- A View From the Bridge (1962) .... Marco
- Horace 62 (1961) .... Noël Colonna
- Carillons Sans Joie (1962) .... Charles Bourgeon
- The Mysteries of Paris (1962) .... Baron de Lansignac
- Imperial Venus (1962) .... Napoleon Bonaparte
- La Bonne Soupe (1964) .... Armand Boulard
- Behold a Pale Horse (1964) .... Carlos
- Fantômas (1964) .... Fantômas (voice, uncredited)
- Un soir à Tibériade (1965) .... L'ingénieur Carlo Bronti
- OSS 117 Mission for a Killer (1965) .... Leandro
- Fantômas se déchaîne (1965) .... Fantômas (voice, uncredited)
- Brigade antigangs (1966) .... Roger Sartet
- Le Deuxième Souffle (1966) .... Paul Ricci
- Maigret a Pigalle (1966) .... Fred Alfonsi
- L'Écharpe (1966, based on The Scarf, by Francis Durbridge), directed by Abder Isker
- Fantômas contre Scotland Yard (1967) .... Fantômas (voice, uncredited)
- L'Homme qui valait des milliards (1967) .... Novak
- A Taste of Death (1968) .... Bill Ransom
- Sous le signe de Monte-Cristo (1968) .... Morcerf
- The Conspiracy of Torture (1969) .... Cardinal Lanciani
- Un caso di coscienza (1970) .... Solfi
- La Part des lions (1971) .... Marcati
- Le Saut de l'ange (1971) .... Diego Alvarez
- L'Odeur des fauves (1972) .... Fallen
- Les Intrus (1972) .... Frédéric Personne
- Shadows Unseen (1972) .... Nicola Dalò
- Gang War in Naples (1972) .... Don Mario Capece
- The Big Family (1973) .... Don Peppino Scalise
- Un officier de police sans importance (1973) .... Commissaire Dekervan
- Crescete e moltiplicatevi (1973)
- Le Complot (1973) .... Paraux
- Viaggia, ragazza, viaggia, hai la musica nelle vene (1973) .... Giorgio Fontaine
- Flatfoot (1973) .... Lawyer De Ribbis
- Le Solitaire (1973 film) (1973) .... Isnard, 'Kepi-Blanc'
- Blood Brothers (1974) .... Aiossa
- Shoot First, Die Later (1974) .... Pascal
- Only the Wind Knows the Answer (1974) .... Kommissar Jean-Pierre Lacrosse
- H-Bomb (1975, a.k.a. "Great Friday"; Thai name ตัดเลี่ยมเพชร [Dtàt lìam pét])
- The Climber (1975) .... Don Enrico
- Manhunt in the City (1975) .... Inspector Bertone
- Change (1975) .... Antoine Mäzen
- Bait (1976) .... Boss
- Submission (1976) .... Professor Henri Michoud
- A Special Cop in Action (1976) .... Arpino
- Puttana galera! (1976) .... Vangelli
- Quand la ville s'éveille (1977) .... Jo
- Antonio Gramsci: The Days of Prison (1977)
- Fear in the City (1978) .... Lettieri
- orci con la P 38 (1978) .... Olden
- La promessa (1979, TV Movie) .... Il capo della polizia
- Le bar du téléphone (1980) .... Robert Pérez
- Les Uns et les Autres (1981) .... M. Raymond
- Le Rose et le Blanc (1982) .... Albert Faria
- Porca vacca (1982)
- Plus beau que moi, tu meurs (1982) .... L'inspecteur Tétard
- Ronde de nuit (1984) .... Sissia Carpelli - le propriétaire d'un tripot
- Louisiana (1984, TV Movie) .... Morley
- Viva la vie (1984) .... Barret
- Naso di cane (1986, TV Mini-Series) .... Antonio Garofalo
- Jubiabá (1986) .... Le commandeur
- Don Bosco (1988) .... Pio IX
- Der Leibwächter (1989, TV Movie) .... Serge Mazra
