= The Prize (1950 film) =

1950 film by Jean Boyer

- Directed by: Jean Boyer
- Written by: Marcel Pagnol
- Based on: Le Rosier de Madame Husson; 1887 novel by Mireille Perrey
- Produced by: Georges Agiman; Jean Darvey
- Starring: Bourvil; Jacqueline Pagnol; Mireille Perrey
- Cinematography: Charles Suin
- Edited by: Fanchette Mazin
- Music by: Paul Misraki
- Production companies: Eminente Films; Les Films Agiman
- Distributed by: Gaumont Distribution
- Release date: 29 September 1950
- Running time: 84 minutes
- Country: France
- Language: French
- Box office: 4 304 624 admissions (France)

The Prize (French: Le rosier de Madame Husson) is a 1950 French comedy film directed by Jean Boyer and starring Bourvil, Jacqueline Pagnol and Mireille Perrey. It is based on the 1887 novel Le Rosier de Madame Husson. It was shot at the Saint-Maurice Studios in Paris and on location in Normandy including around Eure. The film's sets were designed by the art director Robert Giordani. It was a sizeable box office hit, being the seventh most popular film of the year in France.

== Synopsis ==
A circle of a small town's older ladies decide to award a prize for virtue for a young woman with an unblemished reputation. When it turns out nobody in the settlement qualifies, they instead award it to Isidore an idiotic and bashful young man with a fear of the opposite sex. However when Isidore encounters and spends the night with a countess, who sits on the board giving out the prize, he is suddenly transformed into a worldly figure who returns to the town in triumph.

== Cast ==
- Bourvil as Isidore Pastouret
- Jacqueline Pagnol as Élodie - la bergère / Young Girl
- Mireille Perrey as La comtesse de Blonville / Countess de Blonville
- Pauline Carton as Virginie Pastouret - l'épicière
- Henri Vilbert as Le brigadier / Brigadier of the Gendarmerie
- Jeanne Véniat as Madame Pitard
- Albert Duvaleix as Le curé / Priest
- Germaine Reuver as Nicoline - la fermière
- Jean Dunot as Polyte - le fermier
- Nina Myral as Madame de Gondreville
- Christian Lude as Le docteur Barbesol
- Yvette Etiévant as Marie
- Georges Baconnet as Fulgence Laboureur - le maire
- Suzanne Dehelly as Mdaemoiselle Irène Cadenat
- Germaine Dermoz as Madame Husson
- Fernand Blot as Un conseiller communal
- André Dalibert as Célestin - un conseiller communal
- Marcelle Féry as Une cliente de l'épicerie Pastouret
- Marcel Loche as Un conseiller communal
- Étienne Lorin as Le chef d'orchestre

== Bibliography ==
- Goble, Alan. The Complete Index to Literary Sources in Film. Walter de Gruyter, 1999.
- Oscherwitz, Dayna & Higgins, MaryEllen. The A to Z of French Cinema. Scarecrow Press, 2009.
