= Don't Shout It from the Rooftops =

1943 film

- Directed by: Jacques Daniel-Norman
- Written by: Alex Joffé; Jean Manse; Jean Bernard-Luc
- Produced by: Jean Le Duc; Xavier Revenaz; Roger Sallard
- Starring: Fernandel; Robert Le Vigan; Meg Lemonnier
- Cinematography: Léonce-Henri Burel
- Edited by: Pierre Caillet; Jean Sacha
- Music by: Roger Dumas
- Production company: Société Nouvelle des Établissements Gaumont
- Distributed by: Gaumont
- Release date: 14 July 1943
- Running time: 99 minutes
- Country: France
- Language: French

Don't Shout It from the Rooftops (French: Ne le criez pas sur les toits) is a 1943 French comedy drama film directed by Jacques Daniel-Norman and starring Fernandel, Robert Le Vigan and Meg Lemonnier. It was shot at the Marseille Studios in the Unoccupied Zone of France. The film's sets were designed by the art director Robert Giordani.

== Synopsis ==
Vincent Fleuret, assistant to a celebrated scientist, is working on a formula to try and prolong the life of flowers. His boss is close to inventing a new type of synthetic fuel. After his death a number of people mistakenly believe that Vincent holds the secret of the scientist's potentially valuable discovery.

== Cast ==
- Fernandel as Vincent Fleuret
- Robert Le Vigan as Le professeur Léonard Bontagues
- Meg Lemonnier as Renée Lancel
- Jacques Varennes as Octave
- Thérèse Dorny as Madame Noblet
- Jean Toulout as Le président du tribunal
- Marie-Josée Maffei as Angélica
- Paul Azaïs as P'tit Louis
- Henri Arius as Trapu
- Georges Lannes as Cartier
- Pierre Feuillère as Riquet
- Léon Belières as Monsieur Noblet
- Albert Gercourt as Le professeur Moucherotte
- Marcel André as L'avocat général
- Gaston Séverin as L'avocat de Vincent
- Robert Dalban as Un plombier
- Jacques Berlioz as Le professeur Holtz
- Manuel Gary as Un journaliste
- Lucien Brulé as L'avocat de la défense
- Harry-James as Le premier commanditaire
- Robert Moor as Le deuxième commanditaire
- Jean Daniel as Le groom

== Bibliography ==
- Moraly, Yehuda. Revolution in Paradise: Veiled Representations of Jewish Characters in the Cinema of Occupied France. Liverpool University Press, 2019.
- Rège, Philippe. Encyclopedia of French Film Directors, Volume 1. Scarecrow Press, 2009.
