= Les Films Corona =

French film company

Opening of a film featuring the company's credit.

Les Films Corona was a French film distribution company based in Paris. Active between the 1930s and the 1970s, it also took part in film production during its later years under the guidance of Robert Dorfmann. It enjoyed its greatest success in the postwar era.

Many of its films such as 1968's Mayerling were co-productions.

== Selected filmography ==
- François Villon (1945)
- A Lover's Return (1946)
- The Orchid Man (1946)
- The Adventure of Cabassou (1946)
- Bethsabée (1947)
- The Royalists (1947)
- Crossroads of Passion (1948)
- Woman Without a Past (1948)
- The Cupboard Was Bare (1948)
- Mademoiselle Has Fun (1948)
- Manon (1949)
- Une si jolie petite plage (1949)
- Five Red Tulips (1949)
- At the Grand Balcony (1949)
- The Perfume of the Lady in Black (1949)
- The Lovers Of Verona (1949)
- Thus Finishes the Night (1949)
- Miquette (1950)
- A Man Walks in the City (1950)
- We Will All Go to Paris (1950)
- Bed for Two; Rendezvous with Luck (1950)
- The Chocolate Girl (1950)
- Beauty and the Devil (1950)
- The Glass Castle (1950)
- La Marie du port (1950)
- Without Leaving an Address (1951)
- Never Two Without Three (1951)
- Adhémar (1951)
- Mr. Peek-a-Boo (1951)
- Adventures of Captain Fabian (1951)
- Skipper Next to God (1951)
- The Turkey (1951)
- Matrimonial Agency (1952)
- Forbidden Games (1952)
- The House on the Dune (1952)
- Three Women (1952)
- Les Compagnes de la nuit (1953)
- The Virtuous Scoundrel (1953)
- The Air of Paris (1954)
- Tempest in the Flesh (1954)
- Touchez pas au grisbi (1954)
- The Lovers of Lisbon (1955)
- The Hotshot (1955)
- Magic Village (1955)
- Blackmail (1955)
- House on the Waterfront (1955)
- Je suis un sentimental (1955)
- Gervaise (1956)
- Plucking the Daisy (1956)
- Man and Child (1956)
- Not Delivered (1958)
- Virginie (1962)
- The Bamboo Stroke (1963)
- Relax Darling (1964)
- The Majordomo (1965)
- La Grande Vadrouille (1966)
- Col cuore in gola (1967)
- The Day of the Owl (1968)
- Death Laid an Egg (1968)
- The Great Silence (1968)
- Mayerling (1968)
- The Most Beautiful Month (1968)
- Manon 70 (1968)
- The Battle of El Alamein (1969)
- Army of Shadows (1969)
- The Conspirators (1969)
- Tristana (1970)
- Red Sun (1971)
- A Lizard in a Woman's Skin (1971)
- Long Live Robin Hood (1971)
- Ivanhoe, the Norman Swordsman (1971)
- The Iguana with the Tongue of Fire (1971)
- Trafic (1971)
- Un flic (1972)
- Papillon (1973)
- Challenge to White Fang (1974)
- The Blue Ferns (1977)
- Womanlight (1979)

== Bibliography ==
- Crisp, C.G. The Classic French Cinema, 1930-1960. Indiana University Press, 1993
