= Relax Darling =

1964 film

- Directed by: Jean Boyer
- Written by: Jean Boyer
- Based on: Le Complexe de Philémon by Jean Bernard-Luc
- Produced by: Roger de Broin
- Starring: Fernandel; Sandra Milo; Jean-Pierre Marielle
- Cinematography: Robert Lefebvre
- Edited by: Jacqueline Brachet
- Music by: Guy Magenta
- Production companies: Ceres Films; Les Films Corona; Zebra Films
- Distributed by: Les Films Corona
- Release date: 19 August 1964
- Running time: 85 minutes
- Countries: France; Italy
- Language: French

Relax Darling (French: Relaxe-toi chérie) is a 1964 French-Italian comedy film directed by Jean Boyer and starring Fernandel, Sandra Milo and Jean-Pierre Marielle. Based on the play Le Complexe de Philémon by Jean Bernard-Luc, it was the final film of the veteran director Jean Boyer.

The film's sets were designed by the art director Robert Giordani. It was shot at the Billancourt Studios in Paris.

== Synopsis ==
A couple have been happily married for twelve years, until the wife discovers psychoanalysis. She becomes convinced that her husband's normal exterior conceals endless secrets and enlists her friends to try and find out the truth.

== Cast ==
- Fernandel as François Faustin
- Sandra Milo as Helene Faustin
- Jean-Pierre Marielle as David Kouglov
- Jean Lefebvre as Blaise
- Maurice Chevit as Hubert
- Hélène Dieudonné as Antonia
- Jacqueline Jefford as Mademoiselle Pelusso
- Hella Petri as Olga
- Catherine Clarence as La dactylo brune
- Liliane Gaudet as Christiane
- Nicole Gueden as La dactylo blonde
- Kajio Pawlowski as Van Druck, l'industriel hollandais
- Jean-Paul Zola as Le président de la société industrielle
- Pascale Roberts as Cécile
- Yvonne Clech as Lucienne

== Bibliography ==
- Quinlan, David. Quinlan's Illustrated Directory of Film Stars. Batsford, 1996.
