= The Woman with the Orchid =

- Directed by: Raymond Leboursier
- Written by: Raymond Leboursier; R.G. Méra; Jean Pariny
- Produced by: Marius Lesoeur
- Starring: Tilda Thamar; Georges Rollin; Lucien Gallas
- Cinematography: Michel Rocca
- Edited by: Denise Double
- Music by: Charly Bailly; Jean Marion; André Varel
- Production company: Paris-Nice Productions
- Distributed by: Cocinor
- Release date: 4 January 1952
- Running time: 80 minutes
- Country: France
- Language: French

The Woman with the Orchid (French: La femme à l'orchidée) is a 1952 French crime film directed by Raymond Leboursier and starring Tilda Thamar, Georges Rollin and Lucien Gallas.

== Cast ==
- Tilda Thamar as Léna
- Georges Rollin as Karl
- Lucien Gallas as Commissaire Renaudin
- Nada Fiorelli as Une danseuse
- Hennery
- Lucien Callamand
- Félix Clément as Capitaine Wells
- Gisèle Gray as Une amie de Luciano
- Jacques-Elie Moreau
- Jean Esplau
- Fred Ellis
- Michel Barbey as Walter
- Georgette Plana

== Bibliography ==
- Rège, Philippe. Encyclopedia of French Film Directors, Volume 1. Scarecrow Press, 2009.
