= Roger Monteaux =

French actor

- Born: 18 July 1879; Boulogne-Billancourt, Hauts-de-Seine, France
- Died: 23 December 1974 (aged 95); Monaco
- Occupation: Actor
- Years active: 1908 - 1960 (film)

Roger Monteaux (1879–1974) was a French stage and film actor.

== Filmography ==
Year	Title	Role	Notes
1915	Loin des yeux, près du coeur		
1921	Toute une vie		
1922	Le pauvre village	Le directeur d'usine	
1922	Roger la Honte	L. de Noirville	
1924	Le cousin Pons	Le docteur Poulain	
1937	Nights of Fire	Le commissaire	
1938	La goualeuse	Le juge	
1939	Entente cordiale		
1940	Paradise Lost	Le médecin	Uncredited
1947	The Village of Wrath	Le curé	
1949	56 rue Pigalle		
1949	The Pretty Miller Girl		
1949	The King	Aubergiste	
1950	Dominique	Eugène Fougerolles	
1951	Guilty?	L'avocat	
1951	Le bagnard	Le commissaire de police	Uncredited
1951	Adhémar	Le troisième conseiler	
1955	A Missionary		
1956	Les Aventures de Till L'Espiègle	Le bourgmestre	
1957	Le Cas du docteur Laurent	Minor rôle	Uncredited
1960	Normandie-Niémen	posol France v Irane	(final film role)

== Bibliography ==
- Goble, Alan. The Complete Index to Literary Sources in Film. Walter de Gruyter, 1999.
