= The Devil and the Ten Commandments =

Le Diable et les Dix Commandements
- Original French film poster
- Directed by: Julien Duvivier
- Written by: David Alexander; Michel Audiard
- Produced by: Claude Jaeger; Robert Amon
- Starring: Michel Simon; Louis de Funès
- Music by: Georges Garvarentz; Guy Magenta; Michel Magne
- Distributed by: Cinédis (1962) (France); Union Film Distributors Inc. (1963) (USA)
- Release date: 1962
- Running time: 143 minutes; 126 minutes (France)
- Country: France
- Language: French
- Box office: $13.6 million

Le Diable et les Dix Commandements (English: The Devil and the Ten Commandments) is a French film from 1962 directed by Julien Duvivier that consists of seven sketches (eight in the versions shown in Germany and Japan) played by an ensemble cast that includes Michel Simon, Micheline Presle, Françoise Arnoul, Mel Ferrer, Charles Aznavour, Lino Ventura, Fernandel, Alain Delon, Danielle Darrieux, Jean-Claude Brialy, and Louis de Funès.

The film contrasts a series of human failings with the ever-present hope of redemption and a snake (voiced by Claude Rich) adds the Devil's comments.

== Plot ==
Episode 1 Jérôme, the old handyman at a convent, is warned that he will lose his job if he continues to take the name of the Lord in vain, but is saved when the visiting bishop proves to be an old school friend.

Episode 2 To obtain a beautiful necklace, Françoise succumbs to the wealthy Philip, husband of her friend Micheline. Her husband Georges finds the necklace she had hidden and gives it to Micheline after a happy afternoon together.

Episode 3 Denis, a Jesuit novice, leaves the order to avenge his sister's suicide, which was provoked by Garigny, who seduced her into prostitution and drug addiction. The police tell him that Garigny, if convicted for pimping and dealing, would only get a few years. He arranges to confront Garigny alone and unarmed, but in fact has a concealed shotgun. When he says he is leaving to inform the police, Garigny grabs the gun and shoots him dead. In fact Denis had already alerted the police, who arrest Garigny for murder.

Episode 4 A stranger arrives at an isolated farm, saying that he is God. He gets the grandfather, who had pretended to be paralysed, out of his chair and walking, and then eases the last moments of the dying grandmother. On his way out, he is found by the psychiatric nurses who have been looking for him.

Episode 5 Pierre, a medical student who is nearly 21, has a tense relationship with his taciturn father Marcel and shrewish mother Germaine. Out of the blue, Marcel tells him his real mother was Clarisse, now a noted stage actress. When he visits Clarisse after a rehearsal, she first tries to seduce the handsome young stranger and then, without ceasing to be flirtatious, retreats into vagueness once she is told the truth. Realising that she is not worth his time, Pierre resolves to be a good son to the couple who have brought him up.

Episode 6 Having lost interest in his job as a bank cashier, Didier is told to leave at the end of the week. When a gunman appears at his position, he fills the man's suitcase with notes and coins. He then tracks down the thief, breaks into his apartment, and recovers the case. The thief then tracks him down and, after much argument, the two agree to share the loot. On opening the case, it contains bread, wine, and a sausage. The tramp who had substituted his lunch for the money is arrested for the theft.

Episode 7 From Episode 1, Jérôme and the bishop are enjoying a well-lubricated lunch, after which the bishop has difficulty in remembering what are the Ten Commandments.

== Cast ==
=== 1st episode ===
- Michel Simon : Jérôme Chambard
- Lucien Baroux : Monsignor Trousselier
- Claude Nollier : Mother Superior
- Albert Michel : vegetable seller
- Nina Myral : a nun (uncredited)

=== 2nd episode ===
- Micheline Presle : Micheline Allan
- Françoise Arnoul : Françoise Beaufort
- Mel Ferrer : Philip Allan
- Claude Dauphin : Georges Beaufort
- Marcel Dalio : jeweller (uncredited)
- Claude Piéplu : security guard (uncredited)
- Marie-France Pisier : girl at a dance (uncredited)

=== 3rd episode ===
- Charles Aznavour : Denis Mayeux
- Lino Ventura : Garigny, the pimp
- Maurice Biraud : Louis, police inspector
- Maurice Teynac : Father Superior
- Clément Harari : Garigny's muscle

=== 4th episode ===
- Fernandel : the madman
- Germaine Kerjean : grandmother
- Gaston Modot : grandfather
- René Clermont : father

=== 5th episode ===
- Alain Delon : Pierre Messager
- Danielle Darrieux : Clarisse Ardant
- Madeleine Robinson : Germaine Messager
- Georges Wilson : Marcel Messager
- Roland Armontel : Mercier
- Hubert Noël : Clarisse's lover
- Dominique Paturel : actor
- Gaby Basset : Clarisse's dresser
- Raoul Marco : actor

=== 6th episode ===
- Jean-Claude Brialy : Didier Marin, the bank clerk
- Louis de Funès : Antoine Vaillant, the bank raider
- Noël Roquevert : police inspector

=== 7th épisode ===
- Michel Simon : Jérôme Chambard
- Lucien Baroux : Monsignor Trousselier

== Reception ==
According to the US critic Bosley Crowther, only one of the seven episodes tickled him, that in which Louis de Funès and Jean-Claude Brialy star.

== See also ==
- The Ten Commandments (1956 film)
