= Adhémar (film) =

1951 film

- Directed by: Fernandel
- Written by: Sacha Guitry
- Produced by: Henri Bérard; François Carron
- Starring: Fernandel; Jacqueline Pagnol; Bernadette Lange; Meg Lemonnier
- Cinematography: Noël Ramettre
- Edited by: Raymond Lamy
- Music by: Louiguy
- Production company: Indusfilms
- Distributed by: Les Films Corona
- Release date: 14 September 1951
- Running time: 89 minutes
- Country: France
- Language: French

Adhémar (French: Adhémar ou le jouet de la fatalité) is a 1951 French comedy film directed by and starring Fernandel alongside Jacqueline Pagnol, Bernadette Lange and Meg Lemonnier. It was made at the Victorine Studios in Nice. Location shooting took place in Paris, Nice and Monaco. The film's sets were designed by the art director Eugène Piérac.

== Cast ==
- Fernandel as Adhémar Pomme
- Jacqueline Pagnol as La marchande de fleurs
- Bernadette Lange as Clémentine
- Meg Lemonnier as La garde de nuit
- Sophie Mallet as La bonne de l'asile
- Maximilienne as La soeur du Marquis
- Primerose Perret as La bonne de l'hôtel
- Marguerite Pierry as Lady Braconfield
- Annie Ravel as La secrétaire
- Andrex as Tisalé
- Alexandre Arnaudy as Le ministre
- Maurice Bernard as Le quatrième conseiller
- Georges Bever as Le mari trompé
- Albert Duvaleix as L'employé du casino
- Jacques de Féraudy as Le Marquis de Saltarello
- Jean Hervé as Le premier tragédien
- Marcel Lévesque as Brunel-Lacaze
- Roger Monteaux as Le troisième conseiler
- José Noguéro as Don Cristobal
- Jacques Sablon as Le détective privé
- Robert Vidalin as Le deuxième tragédien
- Robert Seller as Le premier conseiller

== Bibliography ==
- Bessy, Maurice & Chirat, Raymond. Histoire du cinéma français: encyclopédie des films, 1940–1950. Pygmalion, 1986
- Rège, Philippe. Encyclopedia of French Film Directors, Volume 1. Scarecrow Press, 2009.
