= Cocinor =

French film company

company logo

Cocinor was a French film production and distribution company based in Paris. Established in 1938 its full name is the Compagnie cinématographique du Nord. It was founded by Ignace Morgenstern out of a former distribution company SEDIF he had previously worked for. The company was later sold to Edmond Tenoudji. The company took over Les Films Marceau and distributed some films under the name Cocinor-Marceau. It also acquired the back catalogue of Charles Delac's old company.

The company established its reputation in the 1950s by releasing a number of commercial hits including comedies. The company also handled films by French New Wave directors from the late 1950s onwards.

== Selected filmography ==
- The Three Cousins (1947)
- Lost Souvenirs (1950)
- Beautiful Love (1951)
- Duel in Dakar (1951)
- Music in the Head (1951)
- Paris Still Sings (1951)
- The Red Inn (1951)
- Feather in the Wind (1952)
- Forbidden Fruit (1952)
- An Artist with Ladies (1952)
- Desperate Decision (1952)
- It Is Midnight, Doctor Schweitzer (1952)
- The Damned Lovers (1952)
- The Woman with the Orchid (1952)
- The Baker of Valorgue (1953)
- The Most Wanted Man (1953)
- Children of Love (1953)
- The Adventurer of Chad (1953)
- Saluti e baci (1953)
- Royal Affairs in Versailles (1954)
- The Sheep Has Five Legs (1954)
- Yours Truly, Blake (1954)
- Storm (1954)
- Papa, Mama, the Maid and I (1954)
- Les Hussards (1955)
- The Little Rebels (1955)
- Your Turn, Callaghan (1955)
- More Whiskey for Callaghan (1955)
- It Happened in Aden (1956)
- And God Created Woman (1956)
- Honoré de Marseille (1956)
- The Case of Doctor Laurent (1957)
- Three Sailors (1957)
- Police Judiciaire (1958)
- Maxime (1958)
- The Lord's Vineyard (1958)
- Life Together (1958)
- The 400 Blows (1959)
- Hiroshima mon amour (1959)
- Les Scélérats (1960)
- Sergeant X (1960)
- Two Women (1960)
- Between Love and Duty (1960)
- Rocco and His Brothers (1960)
- The Season for Love (1961)
- Last Year at Marienbad (1961)
- Prey for the Shadows (1961)
- One Night on the Beach (1961)
- The Game of Truth (1961)
- A View from the Bridge (1962)
- The Changing of the Guard (1962)
- The Suitor (1962)
- It's Not My Business (1962)
- Germinal (1963)
- Enough Rope (1963)
- Contempt (1963)
- L'Immortelle (1963)
- Diary of a Chambermaid (1964)
- Gibraltar (1964)
- The Monocle Laughs (1964)
- The Majordomo (1965)
- The Duke's Gold (1965)
- The Game Is Over (1966)
- The War Is Over (1966)
- Love in the Night (1968)
- Slogan (1969)
- Le Bal du comte d'Orgel (1970)
- Not Dumb, The Bird (1972)

== Bibliography ==
- Crisp, C.G. The Classic French Cinema, 1930-1960. Indiana University Press, 1993
- Baecque, Antoine de & Toubiana, Serge. Truffaut: A Biography. University of California Press, 2000.
- Marie, Michel. The French New Wave: An Artistic School. John Wiley & Sons, 2008.
