= Raoul Marco =

French actor

- Born: 22 November 1892; Paris, France
- Died: 3 April 1971 (aged 78); Paris, France
- Other name: Maurice Raoul Mayzaud
- Occupation: Actor
- Years active: 1931–1971 (film)

Raoul Marco (22 November 1892 – 3 April 1971) was a French film actor.

== Partial filmography ==
- Bric à Brac et compagnie (1931) - Monsieur Verly
- Le gendre de Monsieur Poirier (1933) - Le premier créancier
- The Red Robe (1933) - Bridet
- Chourinette (1934)
- A Man Has Been Stolen (1934) - Inspector
- Les deux canards (1934)
- Liliom (1934) - L'inspecteur - The Detective
- L'or (1934) - O'Kelly
- Night in May (1934) - Le sergent
- The Queen of Biarritz (1934) - Esteban, le mari
- Le diable en bouteille (1935)
- The Mysteries of Paris (1935) - Le Chourineur
- Light Cavalry (1935) - Pietro
- Les gaîtés de la finance (1936) - Le detective
- Donogoo (1936) - (uncredited)
- Ernest the Rebel (1938) - Sam
- L'enfer des anges (1941) - (uncredited)
- The Chain Breaker (1941) - Alphonse
- Finance noire (1943) - X27
- The Woman Who Dared (1944) - Monsieur Noblet
- La Rabouilleuse (1944)
- A Friend Will Come Tonight (1946) - Le maire
- Beauty and the Beast (1946) - The Usurer
- Copie conforme (1947) - Un inspecteur
- Dernière heure, édition spéciale (1949) - Le président
- The Pretty Miller Girl (1949) - Maître Guillaume
- The Unexpected Voyager (1950) - Dupont
- The Sleepwalker (1951) - Le directeur des magasins
- Identité judiciaire (1951) - Le docteur Martin - le médecin légiste
- Duel in Dakar (1951) - Vaminy
- My Wife, My Cow and Me (1952)
- Brelan d'as (1952) - Le docteur
- Feather in the Wind (1952) - Docteur Magazelle
- The Last Robin Hood (1953) - Le principal
- Une fille dans le soleil (1953) - Coste-Combette
- The Lovers of Marianne (1954) - Jobert
- Leguignon the Healer (1954) - Le vétérinaire
- La bella Otero (1954) - Le directeur du Kursaal
- People of No Importance (1956) - Le propriétaire du magasin de meubles
- Paris, Palace Hotel (1956) - Le monsieur 'pince fesse'
- The Man in the Raincoat (1957) - Le régisseur
- The Case of Dr. Laurent (1957) - Un médecin du conseil de l'ordre (uncredited)
- Life Together (1958) - Le docteur Leclerc (uncredited)
- Asphalte (1959) - (uncredited)
- La tête contre les murs (1959)
- Ravishing (1960) - L'aubergiste
- The President (1961)
- Les livreurs (1961)
- The Devil and the Ten Commandments (1962) - (uncredited)
- Up from the Beach (1965) - Cobbler

== Bibliography ==
- Phillips, Alastair. City of Darkness, City of Light: Émigré Filmmakers in Paris, 1929-1939. Amsterdam University Press, 2004.
