= Naïs (film) =

1945 film by Raymond Leboursier and Marcel Pagnol

- Theatrical release poster
- Directed by: Raymond Leboursier; Marcel Pagnol
- Written by: Marcel Pagnol, based on the short story Naïs Micoulin, by Émile Zola
- Produced by: Marcel Pagnol
- Starring: Fernandel; Jacqueline Bouvier; Raymond Pellegrin
- Cinematography: Charles Suin, Walter Wottitz
- Edited by: Jeannette Rongier
- Music by: Vincent Scotto, Henri Tomasi
- Production company: La Société Nouvelle des Films Marcel Pagnol
- Distributed by: Gaumont Distribution
- Release date: 27 November 1945
- Running time: 117 minutes
- Country: France
- Language: French

Nais is a 1945 French romantic drama film directed by Raymond Leboursier and produced by Marcel Pagnol (also an uncredited co-director). It stars comedian Fernandel in one of his dramatic roles. The script was written by Pagnol based on the short story Naïs Micoulin, by Émile Zola.

== Plot ==
Toine, a hunchbacked farmhand, is employed on a property owned by the Rostaings, who live in Aix and only come during the holydays. Toine works under the tyrannical sharecropper Micoulin. A hard-hearted widower, Micoulin treats his own daughter Naïs as if she were his servant.

Toine secretly loves Naïs; he dreams of winning her heart and consoles himself by reading about the exploits of an 18th-century nobleman who was both a hunchback and a ladies' man.

The Rostaing family comes over for the summer. The owners' son, Frédéric, starts a relationship with Naïs. Frédéric has a gambling habit and initially sees Naïs as a summer fling, but then becomes more serious as he falls genuinely in love with her.

Micoulin disapproves of his daughter's love for Frédéric, whom he sees as a debauched lothario. He plans to murder Frédéric by sabotaging a cabin near a cliff on the property, so it will collapse on the young man and look like an accident.

While heartbroken because Naïs loves Frédéric and not him, Toine decides to help the two youngsters; he causes the cabin to collapse earlier on Micoulin, who dies a victim of the trap he had himself prepared. Naïs and Frédéric are now free to be together.

== Cast ==
- Fernandel as Toine
- Jacqueline Bouvier as Naïs Micoulin
- Raymond Pellegrin as Frédéric Rostaing
- Henri Poupon as Micoulin
- Germaine Kerjean as Mrs Rostaing
- Henri Arius as Mr Rostaing
- Charles Blavette as Henri Bernier
- Paule Langlais as Simone

== Production ==
Naïs was Pagnol's return to filmmaking after World War II. The Nazi occupation of France had caused the near-collapse of Pagnol's production system: Pagnol even had to destroy the copies of his latest film project, La Prière aux étoiles, so the German-controlled Continental Films could not get hold of it. Naïs, shot immediately after the war, was the first production of Pagnol's new company, as well as an opportunity to reunite with some of his pre-war colleagues. Pagnol was convinced by director Raymond Leboursier to adapt a short story by Émile Zola. Pagnol's script notably differs from Zola's original story in that it has a happy ending. Pagnol, who produced the film, was present on the set throughout the shooting, closely supervised Leboursier's work and by all accounts directed much of the film himself.

It was also the first film made by Pagnol with actress Jacqueline Bouvier, whom he married later the same year and who went on to star in his next films under the name Jacqueline Pagnol.

== Reception ==
Naïs was a box-office success upon release; it was one of the most popular movies in France in 1945 with 3,467,792 admissions.

== Home media ==
The film was released on DVD and later on Blu-ray and on VOD on several services.
