= Charles Blavette =

French actor (1902–1967)

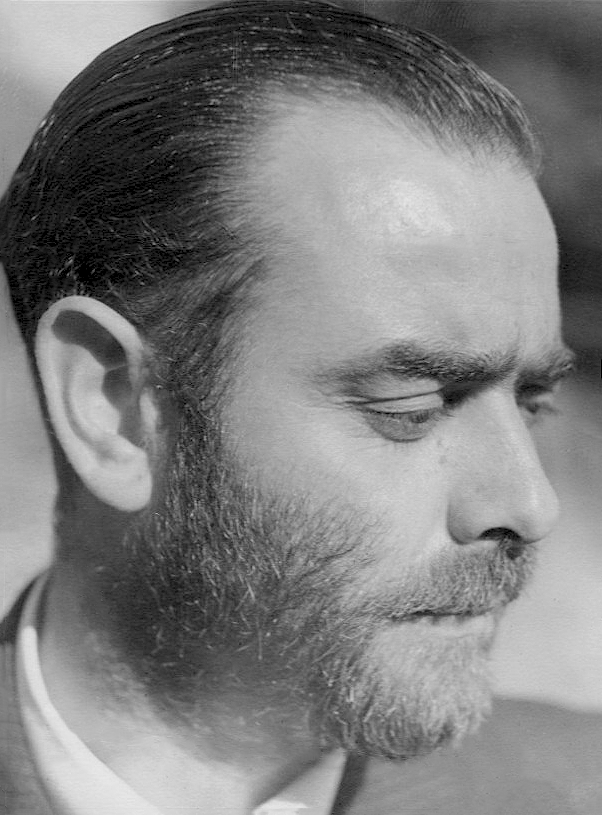
- Born: 24 June 1902; Marseille, France
- Died: 21 November 1967 (aged 65); Suresnes, France
- Occupation: Actor
- Years active: 1933-1966

Charles Blavette (24 June 1902 – 21 November 1967) was a French film actor. He appeared in 50 films between 1933 and 1966.

== Selected filmography ==
- Jofroi (1934) – Antoine
- Angèle (1934) – Tonin
- Toni (1935) – Antonio Canova / Toni
- Cigalon (1935) – Le Gendarme
- Life Belongs to Us (1936) – Tonin
- Harvest (1937) – Jasmin
- La Marseillaise (1938) – Un Marseillais
- The Girls of the Rhône (1938) – Sergent de ville
- The Strange Monsieur Victor (1938) – Le premier inspecteur
- The Baker's Wife (1938) – Antonin
- The Last Turning (1939) – Un camionneur
- The Well-Digger's Daughter (1940) – Le teinturier
- Parade en 7 nuits (1941) – (uncredited)
- Stormy Waters (1941) – Gabriel Tanguy
- Twisted Mistress (1942) – Casimir
- Simplet (1942) – Malandran
- Le soleil a toujours raison (1943)
- Après l'orage (1943)
- The Lucky Star (1943) – Le pêcheur
- Summer Light (1943) – Vincent
- Le val d'enfer (1943) – Cagnard
- Cecile Is Dead (1944) – Monfils
- The Island of Love (1944) – Le contrebandier
- Naïs (1945) – Honoré Bernier l'ingénieur
- Le charcutier de Machonville (1947) – Le bouliste niçois
- Quai des Orfèvres (1947) – Le gendarme Poitevin
- Colomba (1948)
- The Lovers Of Verona (1949) – Le patron de la verrerie
- The Wreck (1949) – Raymond la Douleur
- Prelude to Glory (1950) – Le caissier
- Manon of the Spring (1952) – Pamphile, le menuisier
- Carnival (1953) – Lambrequin
- Le club des 400 coups (1953) – Le garde
- Dangerous Turning (1954)
- House on the Waterfront (1955) – Un homme du 'Goéland' (uncredited)
- The Wicked Go to Hell (1955) – Le pompiste
- Girl and the River (1958) – L'oncle Simon
- Toi, le venin (1959) – L'inspecteur de police
- Archimède le clochard (1959) – Le gendarme cannois (uncredited)
- Picnic on the Grass (1959) – Gaspard
- Eyes Without a Face (1960) – L'homme de la fourrière (scenes deleted)
- Classe Tous Risques (1960) – Bénazet
- The Long Absence (1961) – Fernand
- La Vendetta (1962) – Sosthène
- Sun in Your Eyes (1962)
- Mon oncle du Texas (1962) – Le père
- Two Are Guilty (1963)
- Le roi du village (1963)
- Dis-moi qui tuer (1965) – Un poivrot
- The Gardener of Argenteuil (1966) – M. Arnaud
