= Germaine Kerjean =

French actress

- Born: 22 July 1893; Le Havre, Seine-Inférieure, France
- Died: 6 May 1975 (aged 81); Viry-Châtillon, Paris, France
- Occupation: Actress
- Years active: 1929–1974 (film)

Germaine Kerjean (1893–1975) was a French stage and film actress. She spent a decade with the Comédie-Française. In films she frequently played character roles.

== Filmography ==
Year	Title	Role	Notes
1929	Monte Cristo	La Carconte	
1942	Fra Diavolo		
1942	The Man Who Played with Fire	Madame Suzanne	
1943	It Happened at the Inn	Goupi-Tisane	
1943	The Mysteries of Paris	La Chouette	
1944	Cecile Is Dead	Madame Boynet	
1945	St. Val's Mystery	Madame de Saint-Val	
1945	Naïs	Madame Rostaing	
1946	As Long as I Live	Madame Levallois	
1947	Anger of the Gods	Marthe	
1947	The Scarlet Bazaar	Mme Bonnardet	
1948	Le destin exécrable de Guillemette Babin	Radegonde, la mère de Guillemette	
1948	The Cupboard Was Bare	Madame Coufignac	
1950	God Needs Men	Mme. Kerneis	
1950	Murders	Madame Frangier	
1951	Darling Caroline	La Chabannes	
1951	Messalina	Ismene	
1952	An Artist with Ladies	Madame Vatherin	
1953	Women of Paris	Mme. Rédéri	
1955	Naná	La Tricon	
1955	Proibito	Maddalena Solinas	
1956	Deadlier Than the Male	Madame Chatelin mère	
1958	White Cargo	Irma	
1958	Girl and the River	La tante de Rochebrune	
1958	Women's Prison	La directrice	
1962	The Devil and the Ten Commandments	La grand-mère	(segment "Un seul Dieu tu adoreras")
1963	Kriss Romani	Tinka	
1963	Codine	Anastasia	
1965	Crime on a Summer Morning	Madame Zegetti - la mère de Max	

== Bibliography ==
- Crisp, Colin. French Cinema—A Critical Filmography: Volume 2, 1940-1958. Indiana University Press, 2015.
