= A Man Has Been Stolen =

1934 film

- Directed by: Max Ophüls
- Written by: René Pujol; Hans Wilhelm
- Produced by: Erich Pommer
- Starring: Lili Damita; Henri Garat; Raoul Marco
- Cinematography: René Colas; René Guissart
- Edited by: Ralph Baum
- Music by: Walter Jurmann; Bronislau Kaper
- Production company: Fox Europa
- Distributed by: Fox Film; Gaumont British Distributors (UK)
- Release date: 13 March 1934
- Running time: 102 minutes
- Country: France
- Language: French

A Man Has Been Stolen (French: On a volé un homme) is a 1934 French drama film directed by the German director Max Ophüls and starring Lili Damita, Henri Garat and Raoul Marco.

It was shot at the Joinville Studios in Paris. The film's sets were designed by the art director Max Heilbronner. The film was produced by Erich Pommer, recently escaped from Nazi-controlled Germany, for the European subsidiary of Fox Film. Many of the filmmakers employed were refugees from Nazi Germany.

Pommer also produced another film simultaneously Liliom, a romance film directed by Fritz Lang. Ophüls later suggested that he felt that the two directors had each been assigned to the wrong production "had we exchanged the films Lang most likely would have made an extraordinary mystery and I a very good romantic comedy". Neither film was very successful at the box office. It is now a lost film.

== Synopsis ==
A millionaire is kidnapped, but begins to fall in love with the woman keeping him prisoner.

== Cast ==
- Lili Damita as Annette
- Henri Garat as Jean de Lafaye
- Raoul Marco as Inspector
- Charles Fallot as Victor
- Lucien Callamand as Legros
- Nina Myral as Old Woman
- Pierre Labry as Balafre
- Fernand Fabre as Robert
- Robert Goupil as Legros
- Pierre Piérade as Remy
- Guy Rapp
- André Siméon

== Bibliography ==
- Hardt, Ursula. From Caligari to California: Erich Pommer's Life in the International Film Wars. Berghahn Books, 1996.
- Williams, Alan L. Republic of Images: A History of French Filmmaking. Harvard University Press, 1992.
