= Carnival (1953 film) =

1953 film

- Directed by: Henri Verneuil
- Written by: Marcel Pagnol
- Based on: Dardamelle by Emile Mazaud
- Produced by: Marcel Pagnol; Charles Pons
- Starring: Fernandel; Jacqueline Pagnol; Pauline Carton
- Cinematography: André Germain
- Edited by: Jacques Bianchi; Raymonde Bianchi
- Music by: Raymond Legrand
- Production company: Societe Nouvelle des Films Marcel Pagnol
- Distributed by: Gaumont Distribution
- Release date: 26 July 1953
- Running time: 90 minutes
- Country: France
- Language: French

Carnival (French: Carnaval) is a 1953 French comedy film directed by Henri Verneuil and starring Fernandel, Jacqueline Pagnol and Pauline Carton. It was based on the play Dardamelle by Emile Mazaud. It was shot at the Marseille Studios of Marcel Pagnol and on location around Aix-en-Provence. The film's sets were designed by the art director Robert Giordani.

== Cast ==
- Fernandel as Dardamelle
- Jacqueline Pagnol as Francine Dardamelle
- Pauline Carton as Toinette
- Renée Passeur as Aunt
- Nina Myral as La présidente des filles repenties
- Antonin Berval as Le commissaire
- Manuel Gary as Arthur
- Alexandre Arnaudy as Le curé
- Géo Dorlis as L'éveillé
- Charles Blavette as Lambrequin
- Henri Arius as Mayor
- Mireille Perrey as Isabelle
- Saturnin Fabre as Dr. Caberlot
- Jean Panisse as Le deuxième client

== Bibliography ==
- Oscherwitz, Dayna & Higgins, MaryEllen. The A to Z of French Cinema. Scarecrow Press, 2009.
- Rège, Philippe. Encyclopedia of French Film Directors, Volume 1. Scarecrow Press, 2009.
