= Georges Baconnet =

French actor

- Born: 30 October 1892; Ratenelle, Saône-et-Loire, France
- Died: 9 March 1961 (aged 68); Paris, Île-de-France, France
- Occupation: Actor
- Years active: 1926–1959 (film)

Georges Baconnet (1892–1961) was a French stage and film actor. He was a member of the Comédie-Française from 1946 to his death.

== Selected filmography ==
- The Last Judgment (1945)
- La carcasse et le tord-cou (1958)
- We Will All Go to Paris (1950)
- The Prize (1950)
- Le rosier de Madame Husson (1950)
- Two Pennies Worth of Violets (1951)
- Never Two Without Three (1951)
- Alone in Paris (1951)
- Monsieur Leguignon, Signalman (1952)
- Le Plaisir (1952)
- Their Last Night (1953)
- Madelon (1955)
- The Duratons (1955)
- La joyeuse prison (1956)
- Sénéchal the Magnificent (1957)
- Élisa (1957)
- The Marriage of Figaro (1959)

== Bibliography ==
- Milena Gabanelli & Alessandra Mattirolo. Brigitte Bardot. Gremese Editore, 1983.
