= The Baker of Valorgue =

1953 film

- Directed by: Henri Verneuil
- Written by: Yves Favier; Pierre Lozach; Jean Manse
- Produced by: Jacques Bar
- Starring: Fernandel; Georges Chamarat; Leda Gloria
- Cinematography: Charles Suin
- Edited by: Christian Gaudin
- Music by: Raymond Legrand; Nino Rota
- Production companies: Cite-Films-Fides; Peg Produzione
- Distributed by: Cocinor
- Release date: 27 February 1953
- Running time: 103 minutes
- Countries: France; Italy
- Language: French

The Baker of Valorgue (French: Le boulanger de Valorgue, Italian: Me li mangio vivi) is a 1953 French-Italian comedy film directed by Henri Verneuil and starring Fernandel, Georges Chamarat and Leda Gloria. It was shot at the Saint-Maurice Studios in Paris. The film's sets were designed by the art directors Robert Giordani and Jean Mandaroux. It is also known by the alternative title The Wild Oat.

== Synopsis ==
In the village of Valorgue in Provence, the son of the baker romances the daughter of the grocer before he heads off to do his military service in French Algeria. A baby is born from the assignation, but the baker refuses to acknowledge that it is his grandson and a feud begins between him and the grocer. Soon the whole village is divided into two camps at war with each other.

== Cast ==
- Fernandel as Félicien Hébrard – le boulanger
- Georges Chamarat as M. Aussel
- Pierrette Bruno as Françoise Zanetti
- Leda Gloria as Mme Zanetti, l'épicière
- Francis Linel as Justin Hébrard
- Madeleine Sylvain as Madame Clotilde Hébrard
- Edmond Ardisson as Le facteur Evariste
- Henri Arius as Antonin, le forgeron
- Mag-Avril as La Vieille Fille
- José Casa as Le garde-champêtre
- Manuel Gary as Le Receveur du Car
- René Génin as Arnaud, le secrétaire de mairie
- Antonin Berval as Noël Courtade dit Courtecuisse
- André Carnège as Le sous-préfet
- Jean Mello as Le Gendarme
- Geo Georgey as Le boucher
- Georges Briquet as le reporter
- Jenny Hélia as Prudence
- Marthe Marty as Louise
- Mado Stelli as Félicie
- Fernand Sardou as Le Brigadier
- Jean Gaven as Le curé
- Henri Vilbert as M. le Maire

== Bibliography ==
- Bessy, Maurice & Chirat, Raymond. Histoire du cinéma français: 1951-1955. Pygmalion, 1989.
- Oscherwitz, Dayna & Higgins, MaryEllen. The A to Z of French Cinema. Scarecrow Press, 2009.
