= The Lord's Vineyard =

1958 film

- Directed by: Jean Boyer
- Written by: Jean Boyer; Jean Manse; Serge Veber
- Based on: The Lord's Vineyard by Francis de Croisset and Robert de Flers
- Produced by: Ernest Rupp; Walter Rupp
- Starring: Fernandel; Pierre Dux; Simone Valère
- Cinematography: Charles Suin
- Edited by: Jacqueline Brachet
- Music by: Fred Freed
- Production companies: Cocinor; Régis Films
- Distributed by: Cocinor
- Release date: 24 December 1958
- Running time: 94 minutes
- Country: France
- Language: French

The Lord's Vineyard (French: Les Vignes du Seigneur) is a 1958 French comedy film directed by Jean Boyer and starring Fernandel, Pierre Dux and Simone Valère. The title is a traditional expression for drunkenness in French. It is based on a play by Francis de Croisset and Robert de Flers, which had previously been adapted into a 1932 film.

It was shot at the Billancourt Studios in Paris. The sets were designed by the art director Robert Giordani.

== Cast ==
- Fernandel as Henri Lévrier
- Pierre Dux as Comte Hubert Martin de Kardec
- Simone Valère as Gisèle Bourjeon
- Évelyne Dandry as Yvonne Bourjeon
- Charles Bouillaud as Jean - le domestique des Bourjeon
- Mag-Avril as La générale
- Lona Rita as Lulu
- Jeanne Fusier-Gir as Tante Aline Tremplin
- Michel Garland as Jack
- Béatrice Bretty as Mme. Bourjeon

== Bibliography ==
- Goble, Alan. The Complete Index to Literary Sources in Film. Walter de Gruyter, 1999.
