= Guilty? (1951 film) =

1951 film

- Directed by: Yvan Noé
- Written by: Mario Van Montfort (novel); Yvan Noé
- Produced by: Alexandre Kamenka
- Starring: Raymond Pellegrin; Junie Astor; André Le Gall
- Cinematography: Roger Arrignon
- Edited by: Lola Barache; Henriette Caire
- Music by: Wal Berg
- Production companies: Coopérative du Film Coupable; Les Films Alkam
- Distributed by: Filmsonor Marceau
- Release date: 29 June 1951
- Running time: 83 minutes
- Country: France
- Language: French

Guilty? (French: Coupable?) is a 1951 French mystery film directed by Yvan Noé and starring Raymond Pellegrin, Junie Astor and André Le Gall. It was shot at the Victorine Studios in Nice. The film's sets were designed by the art director Emile Alex.

== Cast ==
- Raymond Pellegrin as Noël Portal
- Arlette Accart as Line Walter
- Junie Astor as Suzanne
- André Le Gall as Charles Walter
- Víctor Merenda as Le contremaître
- Roger Monteaux as L'avocat
- Charles Moulin as Joseph
- Noël Darzal as Ernest - le barman
- Marco Villa as Steve
- Félix Clément
- Gustave Hamilton
- Jean-François Martial
- René Maupré
- Marcelle Pax
- Jacques Valois
- Irène Young

== Bibliography ==
- Goble, Alan. The Complete Index to Literary Sources in Film. Walter de Gruyter, 1999.
