= The Adventure of Cabassou =

1946 film

- Directed by: Gilles Grangier
- Written by: Paul Brehat; Léopold Marchand
- Produced by: René Pagnol
- Starring: Fernandel; Micheline Francey; André Fouché
- Cinematography: Charles Suin
- Edited by: Jeanne Rongier
- Music by: Roger Dumas
- Production company: Les Films René Pagnol
- Distributed by: Les Films Corona
- Release date: 3 June 1946
- Running time: 105 minutes
- Country: France
- Language: French

The Adventure of Cabassou (French: L'aventure de Cabassou) is a 1946 French comedy film directed by Gilles Grangier and starring Fernandel, Micheline Francey and André Fouché. The film's sets were designed by the art director Robert Giordani.

== Synopsis ==
A celebrated architect discovers that his wife has been cheating on him. He goes to live in a cave as a hermit but still keeps in touch with events in the outside world. Finally he attends the unveiling of a statue of himself and reconciles with his wife.

== Cast ==
- Fernandel as Cabassou
- Micheline Francey as Madame Cabassou
- André Fouché as Ocyave
- Marcel Maupi as Motto
- Henri Poupon as Faraille
- Henri Vilbert as Gaudin
- Henri Arius as Carcenac
- Auguste Mouriès as Roubide
- Germaine Gerlata as Mademoiselle Michaux
- Robert Vattier as De Salicette

== Bibliography ==
- Baylie, Claude. Marcel Pagnol, ou, Le cinéma en liberté. Editions Atlas, 1986.
- Rège, Philippe. Encyclopedia of French Film Directors, Volume 1. Scarecrow Press, 2009.
