= The Cupboard Was Bare =

1948 film

- Directed by: Carlo Rim
- Written by: Carlo Rim
- Produced by: Raymond Borderie; Jean Darvey
- Starring: Fernandel; Pauline Carton; Annette Poivre
- Cinematography: Nicolas Hayer
- Edited by: Henri Taverna
- Music by: Georges Van Parys
- Production company: CICC Films Borderie
- Distributed by: Les Films Corona
- Release date: 29 October 1948
- Running time: 90 minutes
- Country: France
- Language: French

The Cupboard Was Bare (French: L'armoire volante) is a 1948 French comedy crime film directed by Carlo Rim and starring Fernandel, Pauline Carton and Annette Poivre. It was shot at the Boulogne Studios in Paris. The film's sets were designed by the art director Emile Alex.

== Synopsis ==
Alfred Puc's elderly and wealth aunt is travelling towards Paris on a furniture van when both she and the truck vanish. It turns out it has been stolen by thieves.

== Cast ==
- Fernandel as Alfred Puc
- Berthe Bovy as Madame Lea Lobligeois
- Pauline Carton as Mme Ovide
- Annette Poivre as Mimi
- Germaine Kerjean as Madame Coufignac
- Marcel Pérès as Frejus
- Albert Dinan as P'tit Louis
- Maximilienne as La commandant e de l'armée du salut
- Paul Demange as Le Frise
- Louis Florencie as Le notaire
- Jean Toulout as L'acteur
- André Bervil as Le premier habitué
- Nina Myral as La première commère
- Jean Témerson as Le deuxième habitué
- Christiane Sertilange as La jeune mariée
- Jean Daurand as Le jeune marié
- Katherine Kath as L'actrice
- Gaston Modot as Un gangster
- Jacques Tarride as Le commissaire-priseur
- René Hell as Le régissseur
- Zélie Yzelle as La deuxième commère
- Luc Andrieux as Le troisième habitué
- Marcelle Monthil as La cliente
- Henri Charrett as Caillol
- Robert Pizani as Le médecin
- Edmond Beauchamp as Le commissaire
- Yves Deniaud as Monsieur Martinet
- Antonin Berval as Grand Charles
- Rivers Cadet as Boirot
- Palmyre Levasseur as Une actrice

== Bibliography ==
- Rège, Philippe. Encyclopedia of French Film Directors, Volume 1. Scarecrow Press, 2009.
