= Ernest the Rebel =

1938 film

- Directed by: Christian-Jaque
- Written by: Jean Manse; Jacques Prévert
- Based on: Ernest the Rebel by Jacques Perret
- Produced by: Jean-Pierre Frogerais
- Starring: Fernandel; Mona Goya; Pierre Alcover
- Cinematography: Raymond Agnel; Robert Lefebvre
- Edited by: William Barache
- Music by: Henri Verdun
- Production company: Productions Sigma
- Distributed by: Les Films Vog
- Release date: 23 September 1938
- Running time: 92 minutes
- Country: France
- Language: French

Ernest the Rebel (French: Ernest le rebelle) is a 1938 French comedy film directed by Christian-Jaque and starring Pierre Alcover, Mona Goya and Arthur Devère. It is based on the 1937 novel of the same title by Jacques Perret. Location shooting took place on the Côte d'Azur around Nice, while interiors were filmed at the city's Victorine Studios. The film's sets were designed by the art director Pierre Schild.

== Synopsis ==
The accordionist working on a cruise liner is accidentally left behind in a South American port and gets involved in a series of adventures.

== Cast ==
- Fernandel as Ernest Pic
- Pierre Alcover as Tonio
- Mona Goya as Suzanne
- Arthur Devère as L'amiral
- René Génin as Démosthène
- Raoul Marco as Sam
- Montero as Le Noir
- Rosita Montenegro as Rosita
- Guillaume de Sax as Gruingue
- Robert Le Vigan as Le gouverneur-président de Mariposa

== Bibliography ==
- Blakeway, Claire. Jacques Prévert: Popular French Theatre and Cinema. Fairleigh Dickinson University Press, 1990.
