= Albert Dinan =

French actor (1902–1976)

- Born: 27 March 1902; Paris, France
- Died: 3 July 1976 (aged 74); Paris, France
- Other name: Albert Edouard Ferdinand Neuzillet
- Occupation: Actor
- Years active: 1931–1970 (film)
- Spouse: Joëlle Meudec (1943-2001)

Albert Dinan (27 March 1902 – 3 July 1976) was a French film actor. He appeared in more than ninety films and television series during his career.

== Selected filmography ==
- Bric à Brac et compagnie (1932) - Jean Verly
- Lunegarde (1946)
- 120, Gare Street (1946) - Bébert
- The Fugitive (1947) - Mac Gregg
- The Adventures of Casanova (1947) - Esprit Jasmin
- A Cop (1947) - Bouthillon
- Le diamant de cent sous (1948) - Jim
- The Murdered Model (1948) - Didier
- Colonel Durand (1948) - Raffart
- City of Hope (1948) - M. Victor
- The Cupboard Was Bare (1948) - P'tit Louis
- Scandal (1948) - Jeff
- L'homme aux mains d'argile (1949) - Buck
- The Red Angel (1949) - Max
- Dernière heure, édition spéciale (1949) - L'inspecteur Perrier
- Drame au Vel'd'Hiv' (1949) - Trois Pattes
- La voyageuse inattendue (1950) - Dudule
- Sending of Flowers (1950) - Rodolphe Salis
- Pigalle-Saint-Germain-des-Prés (1950) - Monsieur Jo
- The Hunted (1950) - Gaston
- Fugitive from Montreal (1950) - Le marchand de journaux
- Street Without a King (1950) - François
- Gunman in the Streets (1950) - Gaston
- Four in a Jeep (1951) - Sgt. Marcel Pasture
- Domenica (1952) - Carlo
- My Wife, My Cow and Me (1952)
- Sergil Amongst the Girls (1952) - L'adjoint
- Trial at the Vatican (1952) - Pranzini
- Rayés des vivants (1952) - Toto
- Je suis un mouchard (1953) - Petit-Jules
- Innocents in Paris (1953) - Louvre Doorman
- Rhine Virgin (1953) - Le commissaire Guérin
- Alarm in Morocco (1953) - Roland
- J'y suis... j'y reste (1953) - Jules
- Crime au Concert Mayol (1954)
- The Infiltrator (1955) - Mariani
- Caroline and the Rebels (1955) - Lieutenant Guéneau
- La villa Sans-Souci (1955) - Le commissaire
- Montmartre Nights (1955) - Francis
- Je suis un sentimental (1955) - Henri
- Gas-Oil (1955) - Émile Serin
- Mémoires d'un flic (1956) - Pino - le patron du Marabout
- Le secret de soeur Angèle (1956) - L'inspecteur de Marseille
- Zaza (1956) - Malardot
- Alerte au deuxième bureau (1956)
- Reproduction interdite (1957) - Le boucher
- The Man in the Raincoat (1957) - Le peintre
- Speaking of Murder (1957) - L'inspecteur Pluvier
- Sénéchal the Magnificent (1957) - Léon Duchêne aka M. Léon
- The Inspector Likes a Fight (1957) - Raty
- Deuxième bureau contre inconnu (1957) - Georio
- Vacances explosives! (1957) - Le brigadier
- Not Delivered (1958) - Aldo
- Sinners of Paris (1958) - Emile, un bistrot indicateur
- La fille de feu (1958) - Captain Le Guen
- The Law Is the Law (1958) - Le brigadier-chef des douanes
- Why Women Sin (1958) - Lefébure - le père de Betty
- Ramuntcho (1959) - Baptistin
- Archimède le clochard (1959) - Le restaurateur
- La bête à l'affût (1959) - Yves Le Guen
- Pêcheur d'Islande (1959) - Quémeneur
- Soupe au lait (1959) - L'ami de Roland
- An Angel on Wheels (1959)
- Rue des prairies (1959) - Le barman de Montfort l'Amaury
- À pleines mains (1960) - Bob
- Les Bonnes Femmes (1960) - Albert
- Tomorrow Is My Turn (1960) - Le milicien Cadix
- Wise Guys (1961) - Albert, un ecclésiastique
- L'imprevisto (1961)
- Daniella by Night (1961)
- Le cave se rebiffe (1961) -Le commissaire Rémy
- Secret File 1413 (1961) - Un inspecteur
- Première brigade criminelle (Dossier Interpol M.A.T. 444) (1962) - Un Inspecteur de Police
- Douce violence (1962) - Popoff
- Gigot (1962) - Bistro Proprietor
- The Gentleman from Epsom (1962) - Léon
- Jeff Gordon, Secret Agent (1963) - L'indicateur (uncredited)
- The Trip to Biarritz (1963) - Bastide
- Les femmes d'abord (1963) - Clémenti
- Carom Shots (1963) - Un homme (uncredited)
- The Bread Peddler (1963) - Le Tourangeau, un boulanger
- Anatomy of a Marriage (1964)
- Le bluffeur (1964) - Henri
- Coplan Takes Risks (1964)
- Requiem pour un caïd (1964) - Inspecteur Picard
- L'homme à la Buick (1968) - Le plombier

== Bibliography ==
- Goble, Alan. The Complete Index to Literary Sources in Film. Walter de Gruyter, 1999.
