= The Trip to Biarritz =

1963 film

- Directed by: Gilles Grangier
- Written by: Michel Audiard; Raymond Castans; Gilles Grangier; Jean Manse; Massimo Uleri
- Based on: The Trip to Biarritz by Jean Sarment
- Produced by: Jacques Plante; Massimo Uleri
- Starring: Fernandel; Michel Galabru; Rellys
- Cinematography: Roger Hubert
- Edited by: Madeleine Gug
- Music by: Georges Van Parys
- Production companies: Millimax; Produzione Cinematografica Mediterranee
- Distributed by: Cinédis
- Release date: 15 March 1963
- Running time: 94 minutes
- Countries: France; Italy
- Language: French

The Trip to Biarritz (French: Le voyage à Biarritz) is a 1963 French-Italian comedy film directed by Gilles Grangier and starring Fernandel, Michel Galabru and Rellys. It is based on the play of the same title by Jean Sarment which was staged at the Comédie-Française in 1936.

It was shot at the Billancourt Studios in Paris and on location in Cadenet, Trets, Toulon and London. The sets were designed by the art director Rino Mondellini. It also marked the final film role of the veteran actress Arletty in the role of a hotel proprietor.

== Synopsis ==
Guillaume Dodut is a stationmaster in rural France at a station where trains no longer stop. His dream has always been to holiday in the famous resort town of Biarritz. Meanwhile, he gets involved in the romantic life of his son who is studying to be an engineer in London.

== Cast ==
- Fernandel as Guillaume Dodut
- Michel Galabru as Touffanel
- Rellys as Louis
- Catherine Sola as Thérèse
- Jacques Chabassol as Charles Dodut
- Hélène Tossy as Madeleine Dodut
- Anna Massey as Marjorie Robertson
- Arletty as Fernande
- Jacques Balutin as Le reporter
- Paul Bonifas as Bourrély
- Daniel Ceccaldi as Paul Bonnenfant
- Albert Dinan as Bastide
- Jean-Pierre Moulin as Philippe
- Gaston Rey as Beaucoiran
- Max de Rieux as Laget
- Michael Anthony
- Richard Caldicot
- José Casa
- Josette Chavassieux
- Jean Daniel
- Germaine Gerlata
- Alvys Maben
- Viviane Méry
- Anthony Stuart
- Robert Casa as Le facteur
- Paul Frankeur as Le chauffeur de la locomotive
- Alix Mahieux as Petit rôle

== Bibliography ==
- Patrice Le Bail & Bruno Le Bail. La forteresse des illusions: petite anthologie du cinéma français. 2007.
