= The Pretty Miller Girl =

1949 film

- Directed by: Marcel Pagnol
- Written by: Marcel Pagnol
- Starring: Tino Rossi; Jacqueline Pagnol; Raoul Marco
- Cinematography: Willy Faktorovitch
- Edited by: Jeanne Rongier
- Music by: Tony Aubin
- Production company: Société du Film La Belle Meunière
- Distributed by: Gaumont
- Release date: 23 November 1949
- Running time: 99 minutes
- Country: France
- Language: French

The Pretty Miller Girl (French: La Belle Meunière) is a 1949 French musical film directed by Marcel Pagnol and starring Tino Rossi, Jacqueline Pagnol and Raoul Marco. It is part of the tradition of operetta films. The title is a reference to Schubert's song cycle Die schöne Müllerin.

== Synopsis ==
Composer Franz Schubert goes to the countryside to find inspiration. He meets a girl, Brigitte, near a windmill. However, the local lord wants her as his lover. Distraught, Schubert leaves and writes some new music to get over it.

The film was shot with Rouxcolor technology. The film's sets were designed by the art director Robert Giordani.

== Cast ==
- Tino Rossi as Franz Schubert
- Jacqueline Pagnol as Brigitte
- Raoul Marco as Maître Guillaume
- Lilia Vetti as the Countess
- Raphaël Patorni as Count Christian
- Emma Lyonel as the Baroness
- Suzanne Desprès as the lavender-girl
- Roger Monteaux
- Christian Bertola
- Jean-Paul Coquelin
- Pierrette Rossi
- Gustave Hamilton
- Edouard Hemme
- Jules Dorpe
