= Raymond Leboursier =

French film editor, film director, actor and screenwriter

- Born: 22 May 1917; Paris
- Died: 26 June 1987 (aged 70); Cannes
- Occupations: film editor, film director, actor and screenwriter.
- Years active: 1930–1969

Raymond Leboursier (22 May 1917 – 26 July 1987) was a French film editor, film director, actor, and screenwriter.

== Filmography ==
=== Actor ===
- 1930: Le Réquisitoire (first title of the film: Homicide) by Dimitri Buchowetzki
- 1931: The Devil's Holiday by Alberto Cavalcanti: Monk McConnell
- 1931: À mi-chemin du ciel by Alberto Cavalcanti
- 1932: Une jeune fille et un million by Fred Ellis and Max Neufeld
- 1934: Un de la montagne by Serge de Poligny
- 1934: Château de rêve by Géza von Bolváry and Henri-Georges Clouzot

=== Director ===
- 1942: Les Petits Riens
- 1945: Naïs, directed with Marcel Pagnol
- 1949: Death Threat
- 1949: Le Furet
- 1951: La vie est un jeu
- 1952: La femme à l'orchidée
- 1959: Henri Gagnon organiste
- 1960: Le Prix de la science (short film)
- 1961: Dubois et fils (documentary), codirected with Bernard Devlin
- 1969: Les Gros Malins

=== Assistant director ===
- 1948: Les Parents terribles by Jean Cocteau

=== Film editor ===
- 1936: Les Petites Alliées de Jean Dréville
- 1937: White Nights in Saint Petersburg de Jean Dréville
- 1937: Men of Prey de Willy Rozier
- 1938: His Uncle from Normandy de Jean Dréville
- 1938: The Chess Player de Jean Dréville
- 1938: Rasputin de Marcel L'Herbier
- 1939: Entente cordiale by Marcel L'Herbier
- 1940: Marseille mes amours by Jacques Daniel-Norman
- 1940: President Haudecoeur by Jean Dréville
- 1941: L'An 40 by Fernand Rivers
- 1941: Un chapeau de paille d'Italie (1941 film) by Maurice Cammage
- 1942: The Newspaper Falls at Five O'Clock by Georges Lacombe
- 1942: Monsieur La Souris by Georges Lacombe
- 1943: Domino by Roger Richebé
- 1948: The Eagle with Two Heads by Jean Cocteau
- 1949: The Cupid Club by Marc-Gilbert Sauvajon
- 1953: Their Last Night by Georges Lacombe
- 1953: La Belle de Cadix by Raymond Bernard
- 1955: Fruits of Summer by Raymond Bernard
- 1955: The Light Across the Street by Georges Lacombe
- 1956: Babes a GoGo by Paul Mesnier
- 1957: The Suspects by Jean Dréville
- 1958: Les Mains nettes by Claude Jutra
- 1959: Les Brûlés by Bernard Devlin
- 1960: Walk down Any Street (short film) by Bernard Devlin
- 1967: Comment les séduire de Jean-Claude Roy
- 1967: The Viscount by Maurice Cloche
