= Robert Giordani =

French art director

- Born: 7 June 1902; Paris, France
- Died: 26 October 1981 (aged 79); Paris, France
- Occupation: Art director
- Years active: 1941-1974 (film & TV)

Robert Giordani (7 June 1902 – 26 October 1981) was a French art director. He designed the sets for more than eighty productions during his career.

== Selected filmography ==
- The Italian Straw Hat (1941)
- The Crossroads (1942)
- Promise to a Stranger (1942)
- The Snow on the Footsteps (1942)
- Arlette and Love (1943)
- A Dog's Life (1943)
- Don't Shout It from the Rooftops (1943)
- The Adventure of Cabassou (1946)
- Rooster Heart (1946)
- The Three Cousins (1947)
- The Ironmaster (1948)
- The Pretty Miller Girl (1949)
- The Prize (1950)
- Monsieur Fabre (1951)
- Topaze (1951)
- Crazy for Love (1952)
- Carnival (1953)
- The Baker of Valorgue (1953)
- A Hundred Francs a Second (1953)
- Madelon (1955)
- Stopover in Orly (1955)
- The Terror with Women (1956)
- Fernandel the Dressmaker (1956)
- Sénéchal the Magnificent (1957)
- Mademoiselle and Her Gang (1957)
- Girls of the Night (1958)
- The Lord's Vineyard (1958)
- Happy Arenas (1958)
- Women's Prison (1958)
- The Indestructible (1959)
- Dynamite Jack (1961)
- It's Not My Business (1962)
- The Bamboo Stroke (1963)
- Relax Darling (1964)
- Angelique and the King (1966)
- Untamable Angelique (1967)
- Angelique and the Sultan (1968)

== Bibliography ==
- Alessandro Pirolini. The Cinema of Preston Sturges: A Critical Study. McFarland, 2014.
