= Fernandel =

French actor (1903–1971)

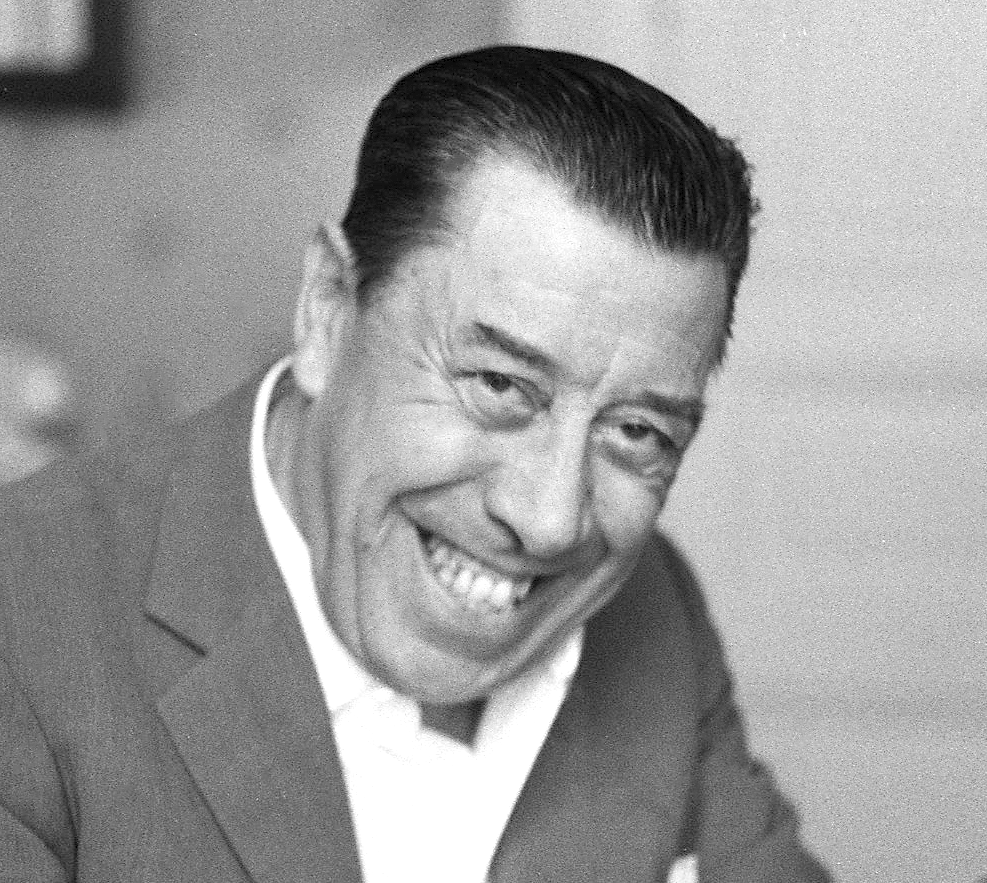
- Fernandel in 1970
- Born: Fernand Joseph Désiré Contandin; 8 May 1903; Marseille, France
- Died: 26 February 1971 (aged 67); Paris, France
- Occupations: Actor; director; singer; comedian
- Years active: 1908–1970
- Spouse: Henriette-Félicie Manse (m. 1925)

Fernand Joseph Désiré Contandin (French pronunciation: [fɛʁnɑ̃ ʒozɛf deziʁe kɔ̃tɑ̃dɛ̃]; 8 May 1903 – 26 February 1971), better known as Fernandel ([fɛʁnɑ̃dɛl]), was a French comic actor. Born in Marseille, France, to Désirée Bedouin and Denis Contandin, originating in Perosa Argentina, a town located in the province of Turin, Italy, he became a comedy star, first gaining popularity in French vaudeville, operettas, and music-hall revues. His stage name originated from his marriage to Henriette Manse, the sister of his best friend and frequent cinematic collaborator Jean Manse. So attentive was he to his wife that his mother-in-law amusingly referred to him as Fernand d'elle ("Her Fernand").

== Biography ==
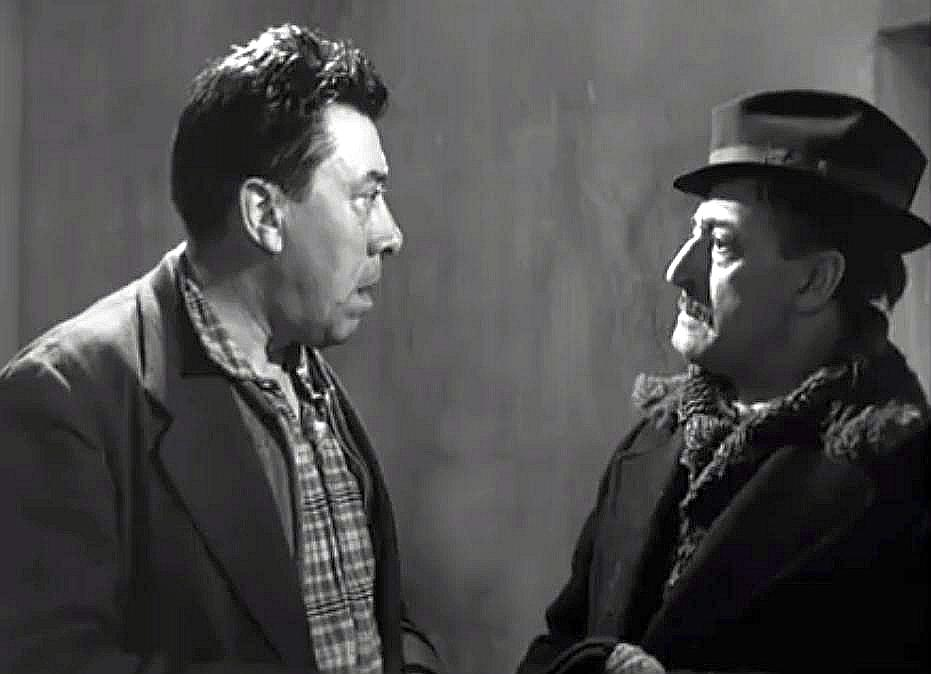
Fernandel (left) and Totò in The Law Is the Law (1958)

Appearing as Fernandel since 1922, in 1930, Fernandel appeared in his first motion picture and for more than forty years he would be one of France's top comic actors. He was perhaps best loved for his portrayal of the irascible Italian village priest at war with the town's Communist mayor in the Don Camillo series of motion pictures. His horse-like teeth became part of his trademark.

He also appeared in Italian and American films. His first Hollywood motion picture was 1956's Around the World in 80 Days in which he played David Niven's coachman. His popular performance in that film led to his starring with Bob Hope and Anita Ekberg in the 1958 comedy Paris Holiday.

In addition to acting, Fernandel also directed or co-produced several of his own films. His profile was raised in Britain by the 60s TV advertisements for Dubonnet in which he would say "Do 'Ave A Dubonnet"

Fernandel died from lung cancer and is buried in the Cimetière de Passy, Paris, France.

== Family ==
He had two daughters, Josette (1926) and Janine (1930), and a son Franck (1935). His son, known as Franck Fernandel, became an actor and a singer. Franck acted alongside his father in two films, Gilles Grangier's L'Âge ingrat and Georges Bianchi's En avant la musique.

== Literature ==
In The Stranger by Albert Camus, Meursault and his girlfriend Marie Cordona watch a movie starring Fernandel on the day after the funeral of Meursault's mother. According to Meursault, "The movie was funny in parts, but otherwise it was just too stupid." In the book, the film is unspecified; in the film version The Stranger (2025 film) by François Ozon, it is Le Schpountz

== Honors and awards ==
- Knight of the Order of Legion of Honour (1953)
- Knight of the Ordre des Palmes Académiques
- Knight of the Ordre des Arts et des Lettres (1960)

== Filmography ==
Year	Title	Role	Director	Notes
1931	Black and White	Le groom vierge	Marc Allégret and Robert Florey	
1931	On purge bébé	Horace Truchet	Jean Renoir	
1931	The Darling of Paris	Ficelle	Augusto Genina	
1931	Bric-à-brac et compagnie	Fernand	André E. Chotin	
1932	Sailor's Song		Carmine Gallone	
1932	Lilac	Le garçon d'honneur	Anatole Litvak	
1932	Le rosier de Madame Husson	Isidore	Dominique Bernard-Deschamps	
1932	Vive la classe	Moussin	Maurice Cammage	
1932	No Women	Casimir	Mario Bonnard	
1932	Fun in the Barracks	Vanderague	Maurice Tourneur	
1932	Man Without a Name	Julot	Roger Le Bon and Gustav Ucicky	
1932	Un beau jour de noces	Gustave Dupied	Maurice Cammage	
1932	Par habitude	Valentin Bourgeasse	Maurice Cammage	
1932	L'Ordonnance malgré lui	Alfred Leveneux	Maurice Cammage	
1933	Le jugement de minuit	Sam Hackitt	Alexander Esway and André Charlot	
1933	The Orderly	Étienne	Viktor Tourjansky	
1933	D'amour et d'eau fraîche	Eloi	Félix Gandéra	
1933	Le coq du régiment	Médard	Maurice Cammage	
1933	Le gros lot		Maurice Cammage	
1933	Ça colle		Christian-Jaque	
1934	La garnison amoureuse	Frédéric, un cavalier	Max de Vaucorbeil	
1934	The Bread Peddler	Billenbuis	René Sti	
1934	Une nuit de folies	Fernand	Maurice Cammage	
1934	Le train de huit heures quarante-sept	Croquebol	Henry Wulschleger	
1934	Les bleus de la marine	Lafraise	Maurice Cammage	
1934	Angèle	Saturnin	Marcel Pagnol	
1934	Skylark	Méchelet	Jean Tarride	
1934	Hotel Free Exchange	Boulot	Marc Allégret	
1934	Le cavalier Lafleur	Fernand Lafleur	Pierre-Jean Ducis	
1934	The Darling of His Concierge	Eugene Crochard	Giuseppe Guarino	
1935	Ferdinand the Roisterer	Ferdinand Piat	René Sti	
1935	Jim la houlette	Moluchet	André Berthomieu	
1936	Les gaîtés de la finance	Marivol Lambinet	Jack Forrester	
1936	A Legionnaire	Fernand Espitalion	Christian-Jacque	
1937	Josette	Albert Durandal aka Albertal	Christian-Jacque	
1937	Francis the First	Honorin	Christian-Jacque	
1937	Les dégourdis de la 11ème	L'ordonnance Patard	Christian-Jacque	
1937	Ignace	Le soldat Ignace Boitaclou	Pierre Colombier	
1937	Life Dances On	Fabien Coutissol	Julien Duvivier	
1937	The Kings of Sport	Fernand	Pierre Colombier	
1937	Harvest	Urbain Gédémus	Marcel Pagnol	
1938	Hercule	Hercule Maffre	Alexander Esway	
1938	Heartbeat	Irénée Fabre, 'le Schpountz'	Marcel Pagnol	
1938	Barnabé	Barnabé	Alexander Esway	
1938	Tricoche and Cacolet	Tricoche	Pierre Colombier	
1938	Ernest the Rebel	Ernest Pic	Christian-Jaque	
1939	Raphaël le tatoué	Modeste Manosque, alias Raphaël	Christian-Jaque	
1939	The Five Cents of Lavarede	Armand Lavarède	Maurice Cammage	
1939	Berlingot and Company	François Arnaud	Fernand Rivers	
1939	Fric-Frac	Marcel	Claude Autant-Lara and Maurice Lehmann	
1940	The Mondesir Heir	Bienaimé de Mondésir, le baron de Mondésir & ses aïeux	Albert Valentin	
1940	Monsieur Hector	Hector	Maurice Cammage	
1940	La Fille du Puisatier	Félipe Rambert	Marcel Pagnol	
1940	The Marvelous Night	Le berger	Jean-Paul Paulin	
1941	The Acrobat	Ernest Sauce	Jean Boyer	
1941	The Suitors Club	Antoine Valoisir	Maurice Gleize	
1941	The Italian Straw Hat	Fadinard	Maurice Cammage	
1942	Simplet	Simplet	Fernandel and Carlo Rim	
1942	Les petits riens	Astier	Raymond Leboursier	
1943	The Lucky Star	Auguste	Jean Boyer	
1943	A Dog's Life	Gustave Bourdillon	Maurice Cammage	
1943	Don't Shout It from the Rooftops	Vincent Fleuret	Jacques Daniel-Norman	
1943	La cavalcade des heures	Antonin	Yvan Noé	
1943	Adrien	Adrien Moulinet	Fernandel	
1945	St. Val's Mystery	Le détective Désiré, Henri Le Sec	René Le Hénaff	
1945	Nais	Toine	Raymond Leboursier	
1946	Hoboes in Paradise	Pons	René Le Hénaff	
1946	The Adventure of Cabassou	Cabassou	Gilles Grangier	
1946	Pétrus	Pétrus	Marc Allégret	
1946	Rooster Heart	Tulipe	Maurice Cloche	
1948	Emile the African	Émile Boulard	Robert Vernay	
1948	If It Makes You Happy	Martial Gonfaron	Jacques Daniel-Norman	
1948	The Cupboard Was Bare	Alfred Puc	Carlo Rim	
1949	The Heroic Monsieur Boniface	Boniface	Maurice Labro	
1949	On demande un assassin	Bob	Ernst Neubach	
1950	I'm in the Revue	Philippe - le peintre dévot	Mario Soldati	
1950	Casimir	Casimir	Richard Pottier	
1950	Tu m'as sauvé la vie	Fortuné Richard	Sacha Guitry	
1950	Murders	Noël Annequin	Richard Pottier	
1950	Uniformes et grandes manœuvres	Luc	René Le Hénaff	
1951	Topaze	Albert Topaze	Marcel Pagnol	
1951	The Sleepwalker	Victor Boniface	Maurice Labro	
1951	The Red Inn	The Monk	Claude Autant-Lara	
1951	Adhémar	Adhémar Pomme	Fernandel	
1951	Village Feud	Urbain Coindet	Henri Verneuil	
1952	Little World of Don Camillo	Don Camillo	Julien Duvivier	
1952	An Artist with Ladies	Marius, dit Mario	Jean Boyer	
1952	Forbidden Fruit	Doctor Charles Pellegrin	Henri Verneuil	
1953	The Baker of Valorgue	Félicien Hébrard - le boulanger	Henri Verneuil	
1953	Carnival	Dardamelle	Henri Verneuil	
1953	The Return of Don Camillo	Don Camillo	Julien Duvivier	
1953	The Most Wanted Man	Joe Calvet	Henri Verneuil	
1954	Mam'zelle Nitouche	Célestin Floridor	Yves Allégret	
1954	The Sheep Has Five Legs	Alain / Désiré / Étienne / Bernard / Charles / Édouard (their father)	Henri Verneuil	
1954	Ali Baba and the Forty Thieves	Ali Baba	Jacques Becker	
1955	Spring, Autumn and Love	Fernand 'Noël' Sarrazin	Gilles Grangier	
1955	Don Camillo's Last Round	Don Camillo	Carmine Gallone	
1956	Don Juan	Sganarelle	John Berry	
1956	Fernandel the Dressmaker	Fernand Vignard	Jean Boyer	
1956	Around the World in 80 Days	a coachman in Paris	Michael Anderson	cameo appearance
1956	The Virtuous Bigamist	Paul Verdier	Mario Soldati	
1956	Honoré de Marseille	Honoré	Maurice Régamey	
1957	The Man in the Raincoat	Albert Constantin	Julien Duvivier	
1957	Sénéchal the Magnificent	François, Lucien Sénéchal	Jean Boyer	
1957	Easiest Profession	Baptistin Lachaud dit Tistin	Jean Boyer	
1958	Paris Holiday	Fernydel	Gerd Oswald	
1958	The Law Is the Law	Ferdinand Pastorelli	Christian-Jaque	
1958	Life Together	Marcel Gaboufigue (Marguerite's husband)	Clément Duhour	
1958	The Lord's Vineyard	Henri Lévrier	Jean Boyer	
1959	The Big Chief	Antoine Venturen	Henri Verneuil	
1959	Le Confident de ces dames	Giuliano Goberti	Jean Boyer	
1959	La Vache et le Prisonnier	Charles Bailly	Henri Verneuil	
1960	Croesus	Jules	Jean Giono	
1960	Le caïd	Justin Migonet	Bernard Borderie	
1961	Cocagne	Marc-Antoine	Maurice Cloche	
1961	The Last Judgement	the widower	Vittorio De Sica	
1961	Don Camillo: Monsignor	Don Camillo	Carmine Gallone	
1961	Dynamite Jack	Dynamite Jack / Antoine Espérandieu	Jean Bastia	
1962	L'assassin est dans l'annuaire	Albert Rimond	Léo Joannon	
1962	Le Diable et les Dix Commandements	Father Gilbert	Julien Duvivier	
1962	The Changing of the Guard	Attilio Cappelaro	Giorgio Bianchi	
1963	The Trip to Biarritz	Guillaume Dodut	Gilles Grangier	
1963	Blague dans le coin	Jeff Burlington	Maurice Labro	
1963	Le bon roi Dagobert	Monsieur Pelletan / Le roi Dagobert	Pierre Chevalier	
1963	La Cuisine au beurre	Fernand Jouvin	Gilles Grangier	
1964	Relax Darling	François Faustin	Jean Boyer	
1964	That Tender Age	Adolphe Lartigue	Gilles Grangier	
1965	Don Camillo in Moscow	Don Camillo	Luigi Comencini	
1966	Your Money or Your Life	Charles Migue	Jean-Pierre Mocky	
1966	Le voyage du père	Quantin	Denys de La Patellière	
1968	L'Homme à la Buick	Armand Favrot	Gilles Grangier	
1969	Nuit de Terreur	Fernando	Camillo Mastrocinque	
1970	Heureux qui comme Ulysse...	Antonin	Henri Colpi	

== Selected discography ==
- "Félicie aussi" (1939)
