= Topaze (1951 film) =

- Directed by: Marcel Pagnol
- Written by: Marcel Pagnol
- Based on: Topaze by Marcel Pagnol
- Starring: Fernandel; Hélène Perdrière; Marcel Vallée
- Cinematography: Philippe Agostini
- Edited by: Monique Lacombe
- Music by: Raymond Legrand
- Production company: Les Films Marcel Pagnol
- Distributed by: Gaumont Distribution
- Release date: 2 February 1951
- Running time: 136 minutes
- Country: France
- Language: French

Topaze is a 1951 French comedy film directed by Marcel Pagnol and starring Fernandel, Hélène Perdrière and Marcel Vallée. It is based on Pagnol's own 1928 play of the same name, which has been adapted for the screen a number of times including a 1936 film directed by Pagnol.

It was shot at the Saint-Maurice Studios in Paris. The film's sets were designed by the art director Robert Giordani.

== Cast ==
- Fernandel as Albert Topaze
- Hélène Perdrière as Suzy Courtois
- Jacqueline Pagnol as Ernestine Muche
- Marcel Vallée as M. Muche
- Jacques Castelot as Roger Gaëtan de Bersac
- Milly Mathis as La barone / The Baroness
- Yvette Etiévant as La dactylo de Topaze / Topaze's typist
- Robert Moor as Le vénérable vieillard
- Rivers Cadet as L'agent de police
- Marcel Loche as Un domestique
- Pierre Larquey as Tamise
- Jacques Morel as Régis Castel-Vernac

== Bibliography ==
- Vincendeau, Ginette. The Companion to French Cinema. Cassell, 1996.
