= Jean Manse =

- Born: 19 November 1899; Marseille, Bouches-du-Rhône, France
- Died: 25 August 1967 (aged 67); Marseille, Bouches-du-Rhône, France
- Occupation: Writer
- Years active: 1932-1963 (film)

Jean Manse (1899–1967) was a French screenwriter. He was the brother of Henriette Manse, and brother-in-law of Fernandel with whom he frequently collaborated. He was also a lyricist, working with composer Henri Betti on the hit Christmas song C'est Noël.

== Selected filmography ==
- Ignace (1937)
- Ernest the Rebel (1938)
- Berlingot and Company (1939)
- The Suitors Club (1941)
- The Lucky Star (1943)
- Don't Shout It from the Rooftops (1943)
- St. Val's Mystery (1945)
- A Dog's Life (1943)
- If It Makes You Happy (1948)
- Casimir (1951)
- The Sleepwalker (1951)
- Forbidden Fruit (1952)
- The Baker of Valorgue (1953)
- Spring, Autumn and Love (1955)
- Honoré de Marseille (1956)
- Fernandel the Dressmaker (1956)
- Don Juan (1956)
- Sénéchal the Magnificent (1957)
- The Lord's Vineyard (1958)
- The Big Chief (1959)
- Cocagne (1961)
- Dynamite Jack (1961)
- The Changing of the Guard (1962)
- The Trip to Biarritz (1963)

== Bibliography ==
- Klossner, Michael. The Europe of 1500-1815 on Film and Television: A Worldwide Filmography of Over 2550 Works, 1895 Through 2000. McFarland & Company, 2002.
