= Henri Poupon =

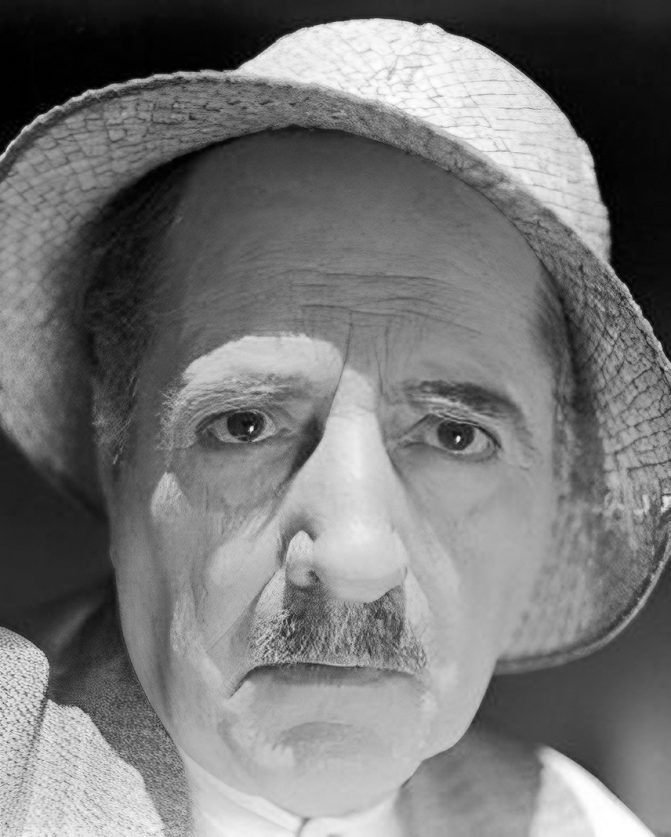
- Born: 14 July 1884; Marseilles, France
- Died: 16 February 1954 (aged 69); Toulon, France
- Occupation: Actor
- Years active: 1930-1953 (film)

Henri Poupon (1884–1953) was a French stage and film actor. He worked a number of times with writer-director Marcel Pagnol.

== Selected filmography ==
- The Fortune (1931)
- To the Polls, Citizens (1932)
- Angèle (1934)
- I Have an Idea (1934)
- Jofroi (1934)
- Merlusse (1935)
- Topaze (1936)
- Blanchette (1937)
- Lady Killer (1937)
- The Rebel (1938)
- If You Return (1938)
- Hercule (1938)
- Heartbeat (1938)
- Stormy Waters (1941)
- Jeannou (1943)
- Arlette and Love (1943)
- The Adventure of Cabassou (1946)
- Mirror (1947)
- Passion for Life (1949)
- A Change in the Wind (1949)
- The Winner's Circle (1950)
- Bouquet of Joy (1951)
- Manon of the Spring (1952)
- The Blonde Gypsy (1953)

== Bibliography ==
- Ann C. Paietta. Teachers in the Movies: A Filmography of Depictions of Grade School, Preschool and Day Care Educators, 1890s to the Present. McFarland, 2007.
