= Alexandre Arnaudy =

French actor

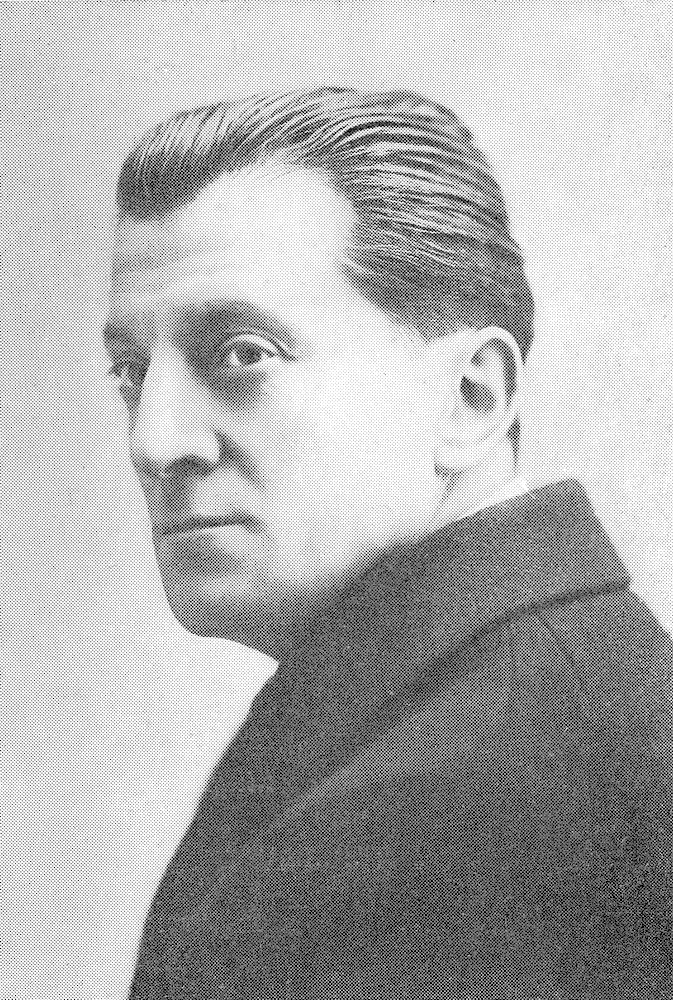
Image of Alexandre Arnaudy

Alexandre Arnaudy was a French actor, born Marius Guarino on July 17, 1881 in Marseille, where he died on November 1, 1969.

== Filmography ==
- 1932 : A Telephone Call from Georges Lacombe : Cormainville
- 1932 : The Last Shock of Jacques de Baroncelli : Vachot
- 1932 : Direct in the heart of Roger Lion and Arnaudy: César Cannebois
- 1933 : The Sunset of the Bride of Roger Lion : Édouard Exubert
- 1934 : The Jean Prince of Jean de Marguenat : Liétard
- 1935 : The alarm bell of Christian-Jaque
- 1935 : Cigalon of Marcel Pagnol: Cigalon
- 1936 : Topaz by Marcel Pagnol : Mr. Topaze
- 1937 : The Daughters of the Rhone by Jean-Paul Paulin
- 1937 : The Escadrille of luck of Max de Vaucorbeil : Tardimont
- 1939 : They were nine singles of Sacha Guitry : Me Renard
- 1946 : The Guardian of Jean de Marguenat : Parish Priest
- 1946 : Not a word to the queen mother of Maurice Cloche
- 1951 : Banco de Prince of Michel Dulud : The concierge
- 1951 : Adhémar of Fernandel : The minister
- 1951 : Village Feud by Henri Verneuil : Miloin
- 1952 : Sergil girls of Jacques Daroy
- 1953 : A girl in the sun of Maurice Cam : Bouzigues
- 1953 : Carnival of Henri Verneuil : The priest

== Theater ==
- 1909 : Lysistrata by Maurice Donnay
- 1912 : The Double Madrigal of Jean Auzanet ; Directed by: André Antoine
- 1922 : Heart Trump of Felix Gandera
- 1922 : The alarm bell of Maurice Hennequin and Romain Coolus
- 1923 : Romance of Robert de Flers and Francis de Croisset
- 1926 : The Rose of September by Jacques Deval
