= Jacqueline Pagnol =

French actress (1920–2016)

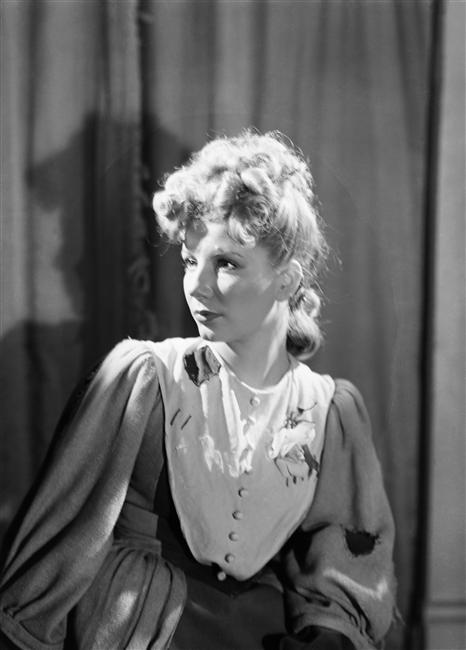
- Jacqueline Pagnol aged 23–24
- Born: Jacqueline Andrée Bouvier; 6 October 1920; Malakoff, France
- Died: 22 August 2016 (aged 95); Paris, France
- Occupation: Actress
- Spouse: Marcel Pagnol
- Children: 2

Jacqueline Andrée Pagnol (French pronunciation: [ʒaklin ɑ̃dʁe paɲɔl]; née Bouvier [buvje]; October 6, 1920 – August 22, 2016) was a French actress. She is best known for being the wife of French author and filmmaker Marcel Pagnol and for starring in several of his films, notably the original Manon of the Spring (1952).

== Biography ==
=== Early life ===
Jacqueline Bouvier was born on 6 October 1920. Though she was born in the Paris area, she spent part of her childhood in Camargue where she tended her aunt's goats. She took classes at Charles Dullin's acting school. In 1938, she met Marcel Pagnol who was auditioning young actors and actresses for a film project based on his own youth. The project fell through but they remained in contact, exchanging letters during the war.

=== Career ===
She began her career in the early 1940s, playing supporting roles in several films. In 1944, she and Marcel Pagnol met again. They eventually began a relationship. Marcel Pagnol later called her his own "touch of poetry and tenderness". According to their grandson Nicolas Pagnol, Jacqueline helped Marcel rediscover his taste for creation after the trials of the Nazi occupation, and her presence later helped him write his highly successful books My Father's Glory and My Mother's Castle. She was called Marcel Pagnol's "muse".

In 1945, Pagnol cast Bouvier in the title role of Naïs, his first post-war film. Following their marriage the same year, she was credited under her married name Jacqueline Pagnol. Her husband later cast her in The Pretty Miller Girl (1949) and the highly successful Topaze (1951).

In 1952, her husband cast her in the title role of Manon of the Spring, which he had written especially for her to star in. She said that the character was partially based on aspects of her own childhood.

Jacqueline Pagnol made several films with other directors, but later said that she had found it boring to work without her husband. After he retired from filmmaking, she put an end to her acting career. She was supported in that choice by her husband, who wished to spend more time with her.

Following Marcel Pagnol's death in 1974, she endeavored to keep his legacy alive, notably creating the Marcel Pagnol literary prize. Owning the rights to her husband's work, she had the responsibility to approve all adaptations. In 1981, she received an honorary César Award.

In the early 1980s, following several years of negotiations, she greenlit Claude Berri's film adaptation project of The Water of the Hills that resulted in the box-office hits Jean de Florette and Manon of the Spring (1986).

== Personal life ==
When not residing in the South, Jacqueline and Marcel lived in Avenue Foch in Paris. They had two children, Frédéric (1946) and Estelle (1951). Estelle died in 1954 of encephalitis, aged 2 and 1/2.

== Death ==
Jacqueline Pagnol died on 22 August 2016 in Paris, aged 95. She was buried alongside her husband and their daughter in La Treille, Marseille.

== Filmography ==
- La maison des sept jeunes filles (1942).
- White Wings (1943).
- Goodbye Leonard (1943).
- Night Shift (1944).
- Nais (1945).
- The Pretty Miller Girl (1949).
- The Prize (1950).
- Topaze (1951).
- Adhémar (1951).
- Manon of the Spring (1952).
- Carnival (1953).
- The Terror with Women (1956).
