= Raymond Legrand =

French composer and conductor (1908–1974)

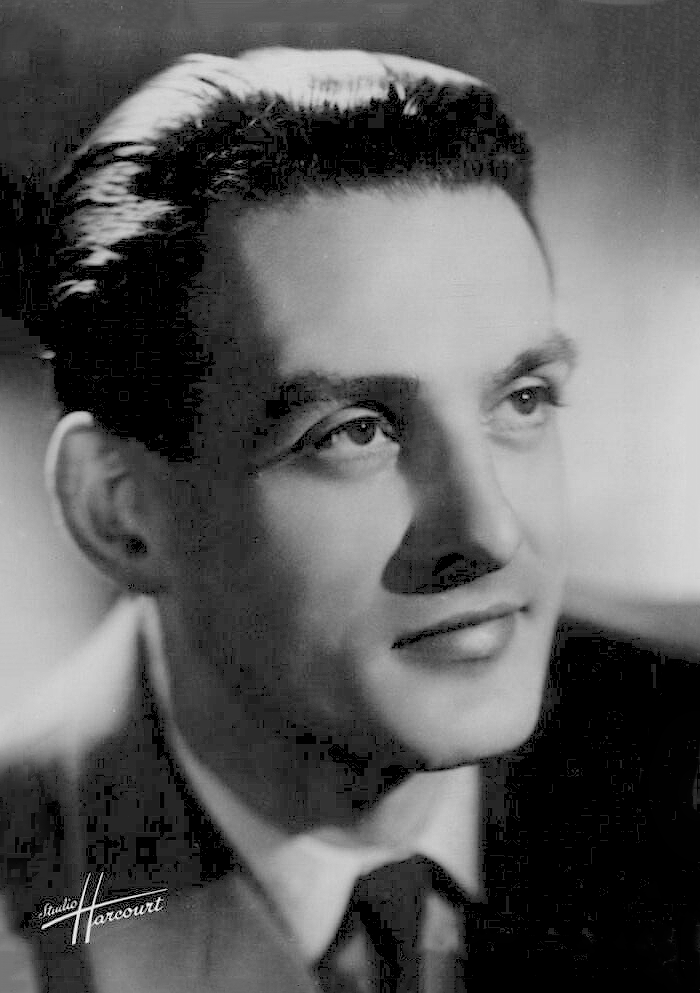
Raymond Legrand poses, turning slightly to his left, looking slightly upwards, showing a very slight smile.

Raymond Paul Legrand (May 23, 1908, in Paris – November 25, 1974, in Nanterre) was a French composer and conductor.

== Career ==
Legrand studied harmony and orchestration as a pupil of Gabriel Faure. In the realms of jazz and light music, he made arrangements for Ray Ventura and his ensemble from 1934, before assembling his own group under the Occupation. He surrounded himself with former musicians met while with Ventura, especially Henri Bourtayre (composition) and Guy Dejardin (arrangement, orchestration). During the Second World War, he participated in the Collaboration with the Vichy government.

Raymond Legrand's orchestra included Irène de Trébert, Maurice Chevalier, Georges Guétary, Tino Rossi, and Colette Renard. He also collaborated with figures of French song like Francis Lemarque, Mouloudji, Édith Piaf and Henri Salvador.

In 1948, he directed the orchestra for the recording of C'est si bon by Les Soeurs Étienne, which became a hit. In 1966, his son Michel Legrand directed the orchestra for the version of this song by Barbra Streisand on the album Color Me Barbra.

He also composed copiously for film.

== Personal life ==
Legrand married Marcelle Ter Mikaëlian (sister of Jacques Hélian) in 1929; their children were the singer Christiane Legrand, born in 1930 and the composer Michel Legrand, born in 1932. By 1935, he abandoned his wife and children. In 1943, he had a son, Michel-Patrick Legrand with the singer Irène de Trebert.

In 1946, he divorced, and several years later married Paulette Bonimond; they had two children, the writer Benjamin Legrand and the painter Olivier Legrand. In 1960, he and Paulette divorced, and he married Colette Renard. In 1971, he divorced again to marry Martine Leroy, with whom he had a daughter, Coralie Legrand.

== Film soundtracks ==
- Grisou, Maurice de Canonge (1938)
- Le Roman de Renard, Ladislas Starewitch and Irène Starewitch (1941)
- Mademoiselle Swing, Richard Pottier (1942)
- Destiny, Richard Pottier (1946)
- Vertigo (1947), Richard Pottier (1946)
- L'aventure commence demain, Richard Pottier (1948)
- Two Loves, Richard Pottier (1949)
- Justice est faite, André Cayatte (1950)
- Murders, Richard Pottier (1950)
- Alone in Paris, Hervé Bromberger (1951)
- Topaze, Marcel Pagnol (1951)
- Manon of the Spring, Marcel Pagnol (1952)
- Nous sommes tous des assassins, André Cayatte (1952)
- Paris chante toujours, Pierre Montazel (1952)
- Une fille dans le soleil, Maurice Cam (1953)
- Les Compagnes de la nuit, Ralph Habib (1953)
- Carnival, Henri Verneuil (1953)
- The Baker of Valorgue, Henri Verneuil (1953)
- Ce soir les jupons volent, Dimitri Kirsanoff (1956)
- Business, Maurice Boutel (1960)
- Clodo, Georges Clair (1975)

== Sources ==
- Chantal Brunschwig, Louis-Jean Calvet, Jean-Claude Klein, Cent ans de chanson française, Seuil, 1972 ISBN 2-02-00-2915-4
- Jacques Hélian, Les Grands orchestres de music-hall en France : souvenirs et témoignages, Filipacchi, 1984 ISBN 2-85018-491-8
- Jean Jour, Roger Darton : pince-moi, je rêve !, Éditions Dricot, 1993 ISBN 2870951272
