= Sénéchal the Magnificent =

1957 film

- Directed by: Jean Boyer
- Written by: Jean Boyer; Jean Manse; Jean-Jacques Rouff; Serge Veber
- Produced by: Jean Boyer; Julien Rivière; Marcel Roux
- Starring: Fernandel; Nadia Gray; Madeleine Barbulée
- Cinematography: Charles Suin
- Edited by: Jacques Desagneaux
- Music by: Paul Misraki
- Production companies: Chronos Films; France Cinéma Productions; Rizzoli Film; Union Cinématographique Lyonnaise
- Distributed by: Cinédis
- Release date: 24 May 1957
- Running time: 95 minutes
- Countries: France; Italy
- Language: French

Sénéchal the Magnificent (French: Sénéchal le magnifique) is a 1957 French-Italian comedy film directed by Jean Boyer and starring Fernandel, Nadia Gray and Madeleine Barbulée. It was shot at Billancourt Studios. The film's sets were designed by the art director Robert Giordani. It is also known by the alternative title His Greatest Role.

== Cast ==
- Fernandel as François, Lucien Sénéchal
- Nadia Gray as La princesse Marida Ludibescu
- Madeleine Barbulée as Mme Roberte
- Simone Paris as L'actrice qui joue Mme Serval
- Robert Pizani as Le prince Alexandre
- Suzanne Dehelly as La malade
- Roland Armontel as Carlini
- Paul Azaïs as Le garagiste - mécanicien du car
- Georges Baconnet as Le président du tribunal
- Sacha Briquet as Le représentant en télévision
- Jacqueline Caurat as Nicole, une soubrette
- Albert Dinan as Léon Duchêne aka M. Léon
- Giovanni Guarducci as M. de La Torre - attaché d'ambassade
- Georges Lannes as Castel-Boissac
- Jacques Mancier as M. Bardin - le responsible de la tournée théâtrale
- Serge Nadaud as L'acteur qui joue M.Serval
- Gaston Orbal as Le directeur du théâtre
- Liliane Patrick as Mado Clarieux
- André Philip as Beluze
- Pierre Stéphen as Un joueur de poker
- Hélène Tossy as Mme Léon
- Georges Chamarat as Le colonel Trochu
- Jeanne Aubert as La colonelle Trochu

== Bibliography ==
- Bessy, Maurice & Chirat, Raymond. Histoire du cinéma français: 1956-1960. Pygmalion, 1986.
- Oscherwitz, Dayna & Higgins, MaryEllen. The A to Z of French Cinema. Scarecrow Press, 2009.
