= Jean Panisse =

French actor (1928–2021)

- Born: 17 March 1928; Marseille, France
- Died: 1 January 2021 (aged 92); Marseille, France
- Occupation: Actor
- Years active: 1952–2004

Jean Panisse (17 March 1928 – 1 January 2021) was a French actor.

== Acting career ==
Panisse debuted his acting career by starring in the French movie Les Révoltés du Danaé.

== Death ==
Panisse died from complications of COVID-19 on 1 January 2021, at the age of 92, during the COVID-19 pandemic in France.

== Selected filmography ==
- Manon of the Spring (1952)
- Napoleon Road (1953)
- Carnival (1953)
