= List of French films of 1951 =

A list of films produced in France in 1951.

== A-L ==
Title	Director	Cast	Genre	Notes
Adele's Gift	Émile Couzinet	Marguerite Pierry, Lilo, Charles Dechamps	Comedy	
Adhémar	Fernandel	Fernandel, Jacqueline Pagnol, Meg Lemonnier	Comedy	
Adventures of Captain Fabian	William Marshall	Errol Flynn, Micheline Presle, Vincent Price	Adventure	Co-production with US
Alone in Paris	Hervé Bromberger	Bourvil, Magali Noël, Yvette Etiévant	Comedy drama	
Amazing Monsieur Fabre	Henri Diamant-Berger	Pierre Fresnay, Elina Labourdette, André Randall	Comedy drama	
Andalusia	Robert Vernay	Luis Mariano, Carmen Sevilla, Arlette Poirier	Musical	Co-production with Spain
Atoll K	Léo Joannon	Stan Laurel, Oliver Hardy, Suzy Delair	Comedy	Co-production with Italy
The Beautiful Image	Claude Heymann	Frank Villard, Françoise Christophe, Pierre Larquey	Drama	
Beautiful Love	François Campaux	Giselle Pascal, António Vilar, Odile Versois	Drama	
Bernard and the Lion	Robert Dhéry	Gérard Calvi, René Dupuy, Capucine	Comedy	
Bibi Fricotin	Marcel Blistène	Maurice Baquet, Colette Darfeuil, Alexandre Rignault	Comedy	
The Billionaire Tramp	Hervé Bromberger	Henri Guisol, Jacqueline Gauthier, Raymond Pellegrin	Comedy	
The Black Crown	Luis Saslavsky	María Félix, Vittorio Gassman, Rossano Brazzi	Drama	Co-production with Spain
Bluebeard	Christian-Jaque	Hans Albers, Cécile Aubry, Lina Carstens	Comedy	Co-production with West Germany and Switzerland
Bouquet of Joy	Maurice Cam	Charles Trenet, Tilda Thamar, Jean Lefebvre	Comedy	
The Cape of Hope	Raymond Bernard	Edwige Feuillère, Frank Villard, Jean Debucourt	Drama	Co-production with Italy
Captain Ardant	André Zwoboda	Yves Vincent, Renée Saint-Cyr, Roland Toutain	Adventure	
Casabianca	Georges Péclet	Pierre Dudan, Gérard Landry, Alain Terrane	War	
The Case of Doctor Galloy	Maurice Boutel	Jean-Pierre Kérien, Henri Rollan, Suzy Prim	Drama	
Clara de Montargis	Henri Decoin	Ludmilla Tchérina, Michel François, Louis Seigner	Drama	
Come Down, Someone Wants You	Jean Laviron	Noëlle Norman, Daniel Clérice, Paulette Dubost	Comedy	
The Convict	Willy Rozier	Lucien Nat, Lili Bontemps, Juliette Faber	Drama	
Coq en pâte	Charles-Félix Tavano	Jacqueline Gauthier, Maurice Escande, Annette Poivre	Comedy	
Dakota 308	Jacques Daniel-Norman	Suzy Carrier, Jean Pâqui, Louis Seigner	Crime	
Darling Caroline	Richard Pottier	Martine Carol, Jacques Dacqmine, Marie Déa	Historical	
The Darling of His Concierge	René Jayet	Jean Parédès, André Gabriello, Paulette Dubost	Comedy	
Deburau	Sacha Guitry	Sacha Guitry, Lana Marconi, Robert Seller	Biopic	
Diary of a Country Priest	Robert Bresson	Claude Laydu, Adrien Borel, Nicole Maurey	Drama	5 wins & 2 nominations
Dirty Hands	Fernand Rivers	Pierre Brasseur, Daniel Gélin, Claude Nollier	Drama	
The Dream of Andalusia	Luis Lucia	Carmen Sevilla, Arlette Poirier	Musical	Co-production with Spain
Dr. Knock	Guy Lefranc	Louis Jouvet, Jean Brochard, Pierre Renoir	Comedy	
Edward and Caroline	Jacques Becker	Daniel Gélin, Anne Vernon, Elina Labourdette	Comedy	
Gigolo	Roger Richebé	Arletty, Pierre Dux, Nicole Courcel	Drama	
Good Enough to Eat	Raoul André	Gaby Morlay, Louise Carletti, Serge Reggiani	Comedy	
Great Man	Yves Ciampi	Pierre Fresnay, Renée Devillers, Claire Duhamel	Drama	
Guilty?	Yvan Noé	Raymond Pellegrin, Junie Astor, André Le Gall	Mystery	
His Last Twelve Hours	Luigi Zampa	Jean Gabin, Mariella Lotti, Elli Parvo	Drama	Co-production with Italy
Juliette, or Key of Dreams	Marcel Carné	Gérard Philipe, Suzanne Cloutier, René Génin	Drama	Entered into the 1951 Cannes Film Festival
The King of Camelots	André Berthomieu	Robert Lamoureux, Colette Ripert, Yves Deniaud	Comedy	
Life Is a Game	Raymond Leboursier	Rellys, Jacqueline Delubac, Jimmy Gaillard	Comedy	
The Little Cardinals	Gilles Grangier	Saturnin Fabre, Véra Norman, Denise Grey	Comedy	
Love and Desire	Henri Decoin	Martine Carol, António Vilar, Carmen Sevilla	Drama	Co-production with Spain
The Lovers of Bras-Mort	Marcello Pagliero	Nicole Courcel, Frank Villard, Henri Génès	Drama	

== M-Z ==
Title	Director	Cast	Genre	Notes
Mammy	Jean Stelli	Gaby Morlay, Pierre Larquey, Françoise Arnoul	Drama	
Maria of the End of the World	Jean Stelli	Paul Meurisse, Jacques Berthier, Marcel Delaître	Drama	
Miracles Only Happen Once	Yves Allégret	Alida Valli, Jean Marais, Marcelle Arnold	Drama	Co-production with Italy
Monsieur Fabre	Henri Diamant-Berger	Pierre Fresnay, Elina Labourdette, André Randall	Comedy	
Monsieur Octave	Maurice Boutel	Pierre Larquey, Marcel Pérès, Irène de Trebert	Comedy	
The Most Beautiful Girl in the World	Christian Stengel	Françoise Arnoul, Jacqueline Gauthier, Paul Bernard	Comedy	
Moumou	René Jayet	Robert Murzeau, Nathalie Nattier, Jeannette Batti	Comedy	
Mr. Peek-a-Boo	Jean Boyer	Bourvil, Joan Greenwood, Marcelle Arnold	Comedy	
Music in the Head	Georges Combret, Claude Orval	Jacques Hélian, Jimmy Gaillard, Colette Deréal	Musical	
My Seal and Them	Pierre Billon	Marie Daëms, François Périer, Jeanne Fusier-Gir	Comedy	
My Wife Is Formidable	André Hunebelle	Fernand Gravey, Louis de Funès	Comedy	
Never Two Without Three	André Berthomieu	Roger Nicolas, Marthe Mercadier, Alice Tissot	Comedy	
The Night Is My Kingdom	Georges Lacombe	Jean Gabin, Simone Valère, Gérard Oury	Drama	
Nightclub	Alfred Rode	Claudine Dupuis, Louis Seigner, Junie Astor	Musical crime	
Olivia	Jacqueline Audry	Edwige Feuillère, Simone Simon, Suzanne Dehelly	Drama	
Pardon My French	Bernard Vorhaus	Paul Henreid, Merle Oberon, Jim Gérald	Comedy	Co-production with US
Paris Still Sings	Pierre Montazel	Lucien Baroux, Madeleine Lebeau, Clément Duhour	Musical	
Paris Vice Squad	Hervé Bromberger	Odette Barencey, Robert Berri	Crime thriller	
The Passage of Venus	Maurice Gleize	Pierre Larquey, Blanchette Brunoy, Annette Poivre	Comedy	
The Passerby	Henri Calef	Henri Vidal, Maria Mauban	Drama	
Passion	Georges Lampin	Viviane Romance, Clément Duhour, Paul Frankeur	Drama	
Piédalu in Paris	Jean Loubignac	Félix Oudart, Nathalie Nattier, Armand Bernard	Comedy	
Poison	Sacha Guitry	Michel Simon, Marcelle Arnold	Comedy drama	
The Prettiest Sin in the World	Gilles Grangier	Georges Marchal, Dany Robin, Marthe Mercadier	Romantic comedy	
The Real Culprit	Pierre Thévenard	Raymond Souplex, Philippe Lemaire, Jean Davy	Crime	
The Red Inn	Claude Autant-Lara	Fernandel, Françoise Rosay, Julien Carette	Comedy crime	
The Red Needle	Emil-Edwin Reinert	Michel Auclair, Michèle Philippe, Jean Marchat	Drama	
The Red Rose	Marcello Pagliero	Françoise Arnoul, Yves Deniaud, Dora Doll	Comedy	
Rendezvous in Grenada	Richard Pottier	Luis Mariano, Nicole Maurey, Jean Tissier	Musical	
The River	Jean Renoir	Esmond Knight, Nora Swinburne, Arthur Shields	Romantic drama	Nominated for 2 BAFTA, 1+ win, +1 nom.
Rome-Paris-Rome	Luigi Zampa	Aldo Fabrizi, Sophie Desmarets, Peppino De Filippo	Comedy	Co-production with Italy
Rue des Saussaies	Ralph Habib	Anne Vernon, Maurice Régamey, Aimé Clariond	Crime	
Savage Triangle	Jean Delannoy	Madeleine Robinson, Frank Villard, Henri Vilbert	Drama	
Serenade to the Executioner	Jean Stelli	Paul Meurisse, Tilda Thamar, Antonin Berval	Crime	
Shadow and Light	Henri Calef	Simone Signoret, María Casares	Drama	
Sins of Madeleine	Henri Lepage	Madeleine Lebeau, Henri Vilbert	Drama	
Skipper Next to God	Louis Daquin	Pierre Brasseur, Loleh Bellon, Jean-Pierre Grenier	Drama	
The Sleepwalker	Maurice Labro	Fernandel, Andrex, Gaby André	Comedy	
The Straw Lover	Gilles Grangier	Jean-Pierre Aumont, Gaby Sylvia	Comedy	
The Strange Madame X	Jean Grémillon	Michèle Morgan, Henri Vidal	Drama	
Sweet Madness	Jean-Paul Paulin	Marthe Mercadier, André Gabriello, Frédéric Duvallès	Comedy	
That Rascal Anatole	Émile Couzinet	Frédéric Duvallès, Armand Bernard, Daniel Sorano	Comedy	
Tomorrow We Get Divorced	Louis Cuny	Sophie Desmarets, Jean Desailly, Armand Bernard	Comedy	
Topaze	Marcel Pagnol	Fernandel, Hélène Perdrière, Marcel Vallée	Comedy	
The Two Girls	Maurice de Canonge	Léo Marjane, Suzy Prim	Drama	
Two Pennies Worth of Violets	Jean Anouilh	Dany Robin, Georges Baconnet, Madeleine Barbulée	Drama	
Under the Sky of Paris	Julien Duvivier	Brigitte Auber, Paul Frankeur	Drama	
Victor	Claude Heymann	Jean Gabin, Françoise Christophe	Drama	
Village Feud	Henri Verneuil	Fernandel, Maria Mauban, Andrex	Comedy	
The Voyage to America	Henri Lavorel	Pierre Fresnay, Yvonne Printemps, Jean Brochard	Comedy	
Without Leaving an Address	Jean-Paul Le Chanois	Bernard Blier, Danièle Delorme	Comedy	Won the Golden Bear at the 1st Berlin International Film Festival
Young Love	Guy Lefranc	Louis Jouvet, Dany Robin, Daniel Gélin	Drama	

== See also ==
- 1951 in France
