= Wakhevitch =

Wakhevitch, also transliterated Wakhévitch into French, official transliteration Vakevich (Russian: Вакевич) is a Russian surname.

Notable people with this surname include:

- Georges Wakhévitch (1907-1984), Russian-French art director
- Igor Wakhevitch, French composer
