= Capitaine Pantoufle =

1953 film by Guy Lefranc

- Directed by: Guy Lefranc
- Written by: Alfred Adam
- Produced by: Alain Poiré; Paul Wagner; Paul Claudon
- Starring: Madeleine Lebeau; Louis de Funès; Marthe Mercadier
- Cinematography: Maurice Barry
- Edited by: Raymond Lamy
- Music by: Marc Lanjean
- Production company: Gaumont
- Distributed by: Gaumont Distribution
- Release date: 31 July 1953 (France)
- Running time: 90 minutes
- Country: France
- Language: French

Capitaine Pantoufle (English: Captain Pantoufle) is a French comedy film of 1953, directed by Guy Lefranc, written by Alfred Adam, starring Madeleine Lebeau and Louis de Funès. The scenario was based on the work of Alfred Adam – "Many".

== Cast ==
- François Périer : Emmanuel Bonnavent, second-in-command of the bank
- Louis de Funès : Mr. Rachoux, the director of bank
- Marthe Mercadier : Claire Bonnavent, wife of Emmanuel
- Michèle Monty : Carmen, the prostitute
- Noël Roquevert : Mr. Cauchard, the father of Claire
- Jane Marken : Mrs Cauchard, mother of Claire
- Jean Brochard : M. Lesurpied, a colleague of Emmanuel
- Dominique Page : Zite
- Pierre Mondy : Henri
- Françoise Spira : the russet lady
- Judith Magre : the companion of Carmen
- Paul Faivre : Mr. Charnudet, the cashier of the bank
- Léonce Corne : the doctor
- Maguy Horiot : the cashier of café
- Richard Francoeur : Mr. Lamberjeton
- Jacques Jouanneau : The barman of Goéland
- Alain Poiré
