= Auguste Capelier =

French art director (1905–1977)

- Born: 2 April 1905; Paris, France
- Died: 4 May 1977 (aged 72); Paris, France
- Occupation: Art director
- Years active: 1942–1970 (film)

Auguste Capelier (April 2, 1905 – May 4, 1977) was a French art director. He worked designing film sets in the French film industry, often collaborating with Georges Wakhévitch during the early stages of his career. He later worked on international co-productions shot in France.

== Selected filmography ==
- Melody for You (1942)
- Box of Dreams (1945)
- Mademoiselle X (1945)
- Song of the Clouds (1946)
- Messieurs Ludovic (1946)
- Voyage surprise (1947)
- Three Telegrams (1950)
- Marie of the Port (1950)
- Miracles Only Happen Once (1951)
- Love Is at Stake (1957)
- Gigot (1962)
- Behold a Pale Horse (1964)
- The Night of the Generals (1967)
- A Flea in Her Ear (1968)
- The Only Game in Town (1970)
- Hello-Goodbye (1970)

== Bibliography ==
- Capua, Michelangelo. Anatole Litvak: The Life and Films. McFarland, 2015.
- Hayward, Susan. Simone Signoret: The Star as Cultural Sign. Continuum, 2004.
- Turk, Edward Baron . Child of Paradise: Marcel Carné and the Golden Age of French Cinema. Harvard University Press, 1989.
