= Geneviève Morel =

French actress (1916–1989)

- Born: 19 March 1916; Les Andelys, Haute-Normandie, France
- Died: 30 August 1989 (aged 73); Clichy-la-Garenne, Hauts-de-Seine, France
- Occupation: Actress
- Years active: 1940–1966 (film)

Geneviève Morel (1916–1989) was a French stage and film actress.

== Selected filmography ==
- Beating Heart (1940) − Marinette − une élève (uncredited)
- Sarajevo (1940) − (uncredited)
- Madame Sans−Gêne (1941) − Julie − une blanchisseuse (uncredited)
- Ne bougez plus (1941)
- Chèque au porteur (1941) − La dame du vestiaire du dancing (uncredited)
- The Woman I Loved Most (1942) − La bouquetière (uncredited)
- Mademoiselle Swing (1942) − Une chanteuse du 'Trio'
- Signé illisible (1942)
- No Love Allowed (1942) − La femme de chambre (uncredited)
- Secrets (1943) − Magali
- Madame et le mort (1943) − Une philosophe
- Angels of Sin (1943) − Soeur Berthe
- Goodbye Leonard (1943) − La bonne (uncredited)
- Secrets of a Ballerina (1943) − Rosalie, jeune
- Lucrèce (1943) − L'habilleuse
- Cecile Is Dead (1944) − Une amie de Madame Petiot (uncredited)
- Manon, a 326 (1945)
- The Captain (1946)
- Madame et son flirt (1946) − La patronne de l'Hôtel du Théâtre
- The Misfortunes of Sophie (1946) − La bonne de Sophie
- Messieurs Ludovic (1946) − La remplaçante de la concierge des Seguin (uncredited)
- Dropped from Heaven (1946) − La servante de ferme
- Dreams of Love (1947) − La servante
- Nuit sans fin (1947) − Maria
- La maison sous la mer (1947) − Une femme (uncredited)
- Monsieur Vincent (1947) − Marguerite Naseau (uncredited)
- The Lovers of Pont Saint Jean (1947) − La bonne
- La dame d'onze heures (1948) − La cuisinière des Pescara (uncredited)
- Une jeune fille savait (1948) − Sidonie − la bonne
- Clochemerle (1948) − Fouache (uncredited)
- Man to Men (1948) − Amélie Coquillet
- Monelle (1948) − La bonne des Picart (uncredited)
- Two Loves (1949) − Clémentine
- Jean de la Lune (1949) − Louise
- Fantomas Against Fantomas (1949) − Irma
- Manon (1949) − La mère dans le tarin (uncredited)
- White Paws (1949) − Marguerite
- The Barton Mystery (1949) − La bonne de Beverley
- Night Round (1949) − La mère de Michel
- Thirst of Men (1950) − La Savoyarde
- Miquette (1950) − Une commère
- Tuesday's Guest (1950) − La patronne
- Bed for Two; Rendezvous with Luck (1950) − La concierge
- Justice Is Done (1950) − Hortense − la bonne des Flavier (uncredited)
- A Love Under an Umbrella (1950, Short)
- The King of Camelots (1951) − Mme Marguerite
- Without Leaving an Address (1951) − La voisine de palier d'Emile
- The Red Rose (1951) − La dame du vestiaire
- Darling Caroline (1951) − Une voyageuse du coche (uncredited)
- Dr. Knock (1951) − La dame en noir
- The Strange Madame X (1951) − Une invitée
- Two Pennies Worth of Violets (1951) − Germaine
- Monte Carlo Baby (1951) − La voisine
- Paris Still Sings (1951) − La femme de Raoul (uncredited)
- Matrimonial Agency (1952) − La concierge #2
- She and Me (1952) − La buraliste
- Crimson Curtain (1952) − Pierrette − l'habilleuse
- Holiday for Henrietta (1952) − La bonne de l'hôtel de Guyane (uncredited)
- Open Letter (1953) − La grosse dame (uncredited)
- Wonderful Mentality (1953) − La cuisinière
- Minuit... Quai de Bercy (1953) − Une cliente au cabaret (uncredited)
- The Three Musketeers (1953) − La marchande de poulets
- Their Last Night (1953) − La bonne de l'hôtel
- Monte Carlo Baby (1953) − Landlady
- Les révoltés de Lomanach (1954) − Yvonne
- Les hommes ne pensent qu'à ça (1954) − La mère qui marie sa fille
- The Big Knife (1955) − La concierge
- Impasse des vertus (1955) − Rose Séguin
- Blackmail (1955) − La concierge
- The Duratons (1955) − Pauline − la bonne des Duraton
- Marguerite de la nuit (1955) − La concierge
- La Bande à papa (1956) − La marchande de mimosas
- The Suspects (1957) − La dame au cinéma (uncredited)
- Maxime (1958) − Mme Mignolet
- Dans la gueule du loup (1961)
- Par−dessus le mur (1961) − Une voisine

== Bibliography ==
- Ayfre, Amédée. The Films of Robert Bresson. Praeger, 1970.
- Bessy, Maurice & Chirat, Raymond. Histoire du cinéma français: encyclopédie des films, 1940–1950. Pygmalion, 1986
