= Mademoiselle Swing =

- Directed by: Richard Pottier
- Written by: Daniel Margo; Louis Poterat; Richard Pottier
- Produced by: Bernard-Roland
- Starring: Irène de Trebert; Jean Murat; Raymond Legrand
- Cinematography: Nicolas Hayer
- Edited by: Germaine Fouquet
- Music by: Marc Lanjean; Raymond Legrand
- Production company: S.U.F.
- Distributed by: Union Française de Production Cinématographique
- Release date: 12 June 1942
- Running time: 100 minutes
- Country: France
- Language: French

Mademoiselle Swing is a 1942 French musical film directed by Richard Pottier and starring Irène de Trebert, Jean Murat and Raymond Legrand. It was shot at the It was shot at the Photosonor Studios in Paris. The film's sets were designed by the art director Robert Dumesnil.

== Synopsis ==
A young woman with a passion for swing music is bored with her life in provincial Angoulême. When a troupe of swing musicians pass through the town, she decides to follow them to Paris.

== Cast ==
- Irène de Trebert as Irène Dumontier
- Jean Murat as Armand de Vinci
- Raymond Legrand as Raymond Serre et son orchestre
- Elvire Popesco as Sofia de Vinci
- Pierre Mingand as Pierre Dornier
- Saturnin Fabre as Grégoire Dimitresco
- René Génin as Durieu
- Max Elloy as Max
- André Carnège as Le directeur du journal
- Paul Demange as Le chef de gare
- Émile Riandreys as Le secrétaire de l'orchestre
- Albert Brouett as Un membre de l'association
- Marcel Charvey as Le barman
- Édouard Francomme as Un bagagiste
- Maurice Marceau as Villard, le rédacteur des spectacles
- Jean Maugier as Le brigadier
- Geneviève Morel as Une chanteuse du 'Trio'
- Colette Régis as La dame de l'association

== Bibliography ==
- Mike Zwerin. Swing Under the Nazis: Jazz as a Metaphor for Freedom. Cooper Square Press, 2000.
