= Dropped from Heaven =

1946 film directed by Emil E. Reinert

- Directed by: Emil E. Reinert
- Written by: Gérard Carlier; Roger Fernay
- Produced by: Roger Ribadeau-Dumas
- Starring: Jacqueline Gauthier; Claude Dauphin; Giselle Pascal
- Cinematography: Charles Bauer
- Music by: Joe Hajos; Jacques Larue
- Production company: Société Française de Cinématographie
- Distributed by: Compagnie Commerciale Française Cinématographique
- Release date: 31 July 1946
- Running time: 85 minutes
- Country: France
- Language: French

Dropped from Heaven (Tombé du ciel) is a 1946 French comedy film directed by Emil E. Reinert and starring Jacqueline Gauthier, Claude Dauphin and Giselle Pascal. A singer jokingly tells one of her bandmates that he is the father of her child, who is really not her daughter at all but belongs to a friend.

== Cast ==
- Jacqueline Gauthier as Gaby
- Claude Dauphin as Maurice
- Giselle Pascal as Madeleine
- Albert Broquin
- Jean Carmet
- Henri de Livry
- Pierre Destailles as Fernand
- Mona Dol
- Charlotte Ecard
- Jean Gabert
- Jean Gaven as Robert
- Renaud Mary as Raymond
- Geneviève Morel
- Félix Oudart as Léon
- Sinoël
- Roger Vincent
- Jeanne Véniat

== Production ==
Guy Lefranc was assistant director on the movie.

== Bibliography ==
- Rège, Philippe. Encyclopedia of French Film Directors, Volume 1. Scarecrow Press, 2009.
