= Night Warning =

Night Warning may refer to:

- Butcher, Baker, Nightmare Maker, later released as Night Warning, a 1981 American exploitation horror film
- Night Warning (1946 film), a French war drama film
