= The Adventures of Casanova =

1947 film

- Directed by: Jean Boyer
- Written by: Marc-Gilbert Sauvajon
- Based on: Memoirs of Jacques Casanova by Giacomo Casanova
- Produced by: Lucien Masson
- Starring: Georges Guétary; Aimé Clariond; Noëlle Norman
- Cinematography: Charles Suin
- Edited by: Fanchette Mazin
- Music by: René Sylviano
- Production company: La Société des Films Sirius
- Distributed by: La Société des Films Sirius
- Release dates: 26 February 1947 (part I); 26 March 1947 (part II)
- Running time: 100 minutes (part I); 88 minutes (part II)
- Country: France
- Language: French

The Adventures of Casanova (French: Les aventures de Casanova) is a 1947 French historical adventure film directed by Jean Boyer and starring Georges Guétary, Aimé Clariond and Noëlle Norman. It was shot at the Epinay Studios and the Photosonor Studios in Paris. The film's sets were designed by the art director Jacques Krauss. Inspired by the Memoirs of Jacques Casanova by Giacomo Casanova, it was released in two parts.

== Cast ==
- Georges Guétary as Le chevalier Giacomo Casanova de Seingalt
- Aimé Clariond as Don Luis
- Noëlle Norman as Clotilde du Manoir
- Gisèle Préville as Esther Van Hope
- Jacqueline Gauthier as La danseuse Coraline
- Albert Dinan as Esprit Jasmin
- Gisèle Casadesus as Geneviève de Cerlin
- Jean Tissier as Van Hope
- Hélène Dassonville as Henriette de Labzac
- Georges Tourreil as Piquebise
- Luce Feyrer as La Borelli
- Claudette Falco as La fille du juge
- Lucien Pascal as François
- Marcel Pérès as Le sergent
- Marcel Charvey as Comédien
- Georges Jamin as L'officier de police
- Gaston Mauger as L'aubergiste de la 'Pomme de Pin'
- Pierre Labry as Le moine
- Nicolas Amato as Le directeur du théâtre
- Raymond Faure as Le seigneur Tortoli
- Micheline Gary as Consuela
- André Bervil as Croce
- Marguerite Ducouret as Concepcion
- Barbara Shaw as Lady Ancliff
- Raymond Loyer as Maxime de Cerlin

== Bibliography ==
- Curti, Roberto. Riccardo Freda: The Life and Works of a Born Filmmaker. McFarland, 2017.
- Rège, Philippe. Encyclopedia of French Film Directors, Volume 1. Scarecrow Press, 2009.
