= Mademoiselle Has Fun =

1948 film

- Directed by: Jean Boyer
- Written by: Jean Boyer; Serge Véber
- Produced by: Jean Darvey
- Starring: Ray Ventura; Giselle Pascal; Bernard Lancret
- Cinematography: Charles Suin
- Edited by: Franchette Mazin
- Music by: Paul Misraki
- Production company: Hoche Productions
- Distributed by: Les Films Corona
- Release date: 30 January 1948
- Running time: 95 minutes
- Country: France
- Language: French

Mademoiselle Has Fun (French: Mademoiselle s'amuse) is a 1948 French comedy film directed by Jean Boyer and starring Ray Ventura, Giselle Pascal and Bernard Lancret. It was shot at the Photosonor Studios in Paris. The films sets were designed by the art director Jacques Colombier. It portrays the adventures of an American heiress in France.

== Synopsis ==
Christine a spoilt American heiress is asked by her father what she wants for his birthday and is told she wants Ray Ventura and his orchestra to perform for her. They are hired to accompany her on all her activities that day but soon grow frustrated by her whims.

== Cast ==
- Ray Ventura as Ray Ventura
- Giselle Pascal as Christine Gibson
- Bernard Lancret as Jacques Roussel
- Catherine Gay as Thérèse
- Jeannette Batti as Fifi
- Max Elloy
- Henri Legay
- André Toffel
- Henri Salvador as Henri Salvador
- Georges Tourreil as Le commissaire
- Germaine Reuver as La cuisinière
- Marcel Charvey
- Nicolas Amato
- Christiane Barry as Édith
- Roland Bailly as Gégène
- Lucien Hector as Un domestique
- René Stern as Le proviseur
- Georgé
- Georges Lannes as Georgey
- Jeanne Fusier-Gir as Mlle. Agathe
- André Randall as William Gibson
- Annette Poivre as Miette
- Léon Bary as Le gérant
- Rivers Cadet as L'agent
- Gregori Chmara as Petit rôle
- Janine Clairville as Petit rôle
- Marguerite de Morlaye as La marquise
- Jacqueline Huet
- Marcel Loche as Le garçon
- Julien Maffre as Un dur
- Frédéric O'Brady as Petit rôle
- Ray Ventura Orchestra as L'orchestre
- Guy Saint-Clair as Petit rôle
- René Sauvaire as Petit rôle

== Bibliography ==
- Rège, Philippe. Encyclopedia of French Film Directors, Volume 1. Scarecrow Press, 2009.
