= Frederica (1942 film) =

1942 film

- Directed by: Jean Boyer
- Written by: Jean de Letraz
- Based on: Épousez-nous, monsieur by Jean de Letraz
- Produced by: Suzanne Goosens; Marcel Segard
- Starring: Charles Trenet; Elvire Popesco; Jacqueline Gauthier
- Cinematography: Lucien Joulin
- Edited by: Andrée Danis
- Music by: Henri Forterre; Georges Van Parys
- Production company: Jason Films
- Distributed by: Gray-Film
- Release date: 18 November 1942
- Running time: 92 minutes
- Country: France
- Language: French

Frederica (French: Frédérica) is a 1942 French comedy film directed by Jean Boyer and starring Charles Trenet, Elvire Popesco and Jacqueline Gauthier. It is based on a play by Jean de Letraz.

== Synopsis ==
Gilbert Legrant a singer and owner of a cabaret is financially bailed out by his girlfriend Lilette. However, she is outraged when she discovers love letters written by him to a woman named Frederica. Frederica is in fact a fictional creation of his ideal woman, but Lilette doesn't believe him. Gilbert's friend gets his own girlfriend Claudine to pose as Frederica, while in turn a real Frederica arrives from Davos causing further confusion.

== Cast ==
- Charles Trenet as Gilbert Legrant
- Elvire Popesco as Frédérica
- Rellys as Théodule
- Jacqueline Gauthier as Claudine
- Jacques Louvigny as Le baron
- Hélène Tossy as La vendeuse
- Hélène Dartigue as Anaïs
- Maurice Baquet as Un ami de Gilbert
- Francis Blanche as Ami de Gilbert
- Suzet Maïs as Lilette
- Christian Gérard as Un ami de Gilbert
- Robert Arnoux as Julien Blanchet

== Bibliography ==
- Bessy, Maurice & Chirat, Raymond. Histoire du cinéma français: encyclopédie des films, 1940–1950. Pygmalion, 1986
