= Noël Roquevert =

French actor

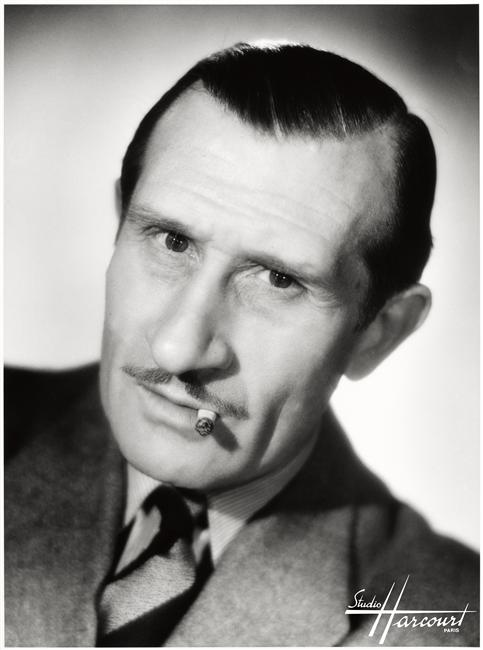
- Roquevert in 1944
- Born: Noël Louis Raymond Bénévent; 18 December 1892; Doué-la-Fontaine, France
- Died: 6 November 1973 (aged 80); Douarnenez, France
- Occupation: Actor
- Years active: 1932–1972
- Spouse: Paulette Noizeux

Noël Roquevert (born Noël Louis Raymond Bénévent; 18 December 1892 – 6 November 1973) was a French stage and film actor. He appeared in more than 180 films between 1932 and 1972. Roquevert was born in Doué-la-Fontaine and was married to stage and film actress Paulette Noizeux. He died in Douarnenez, France, aged 80.

== Partial filmography ==
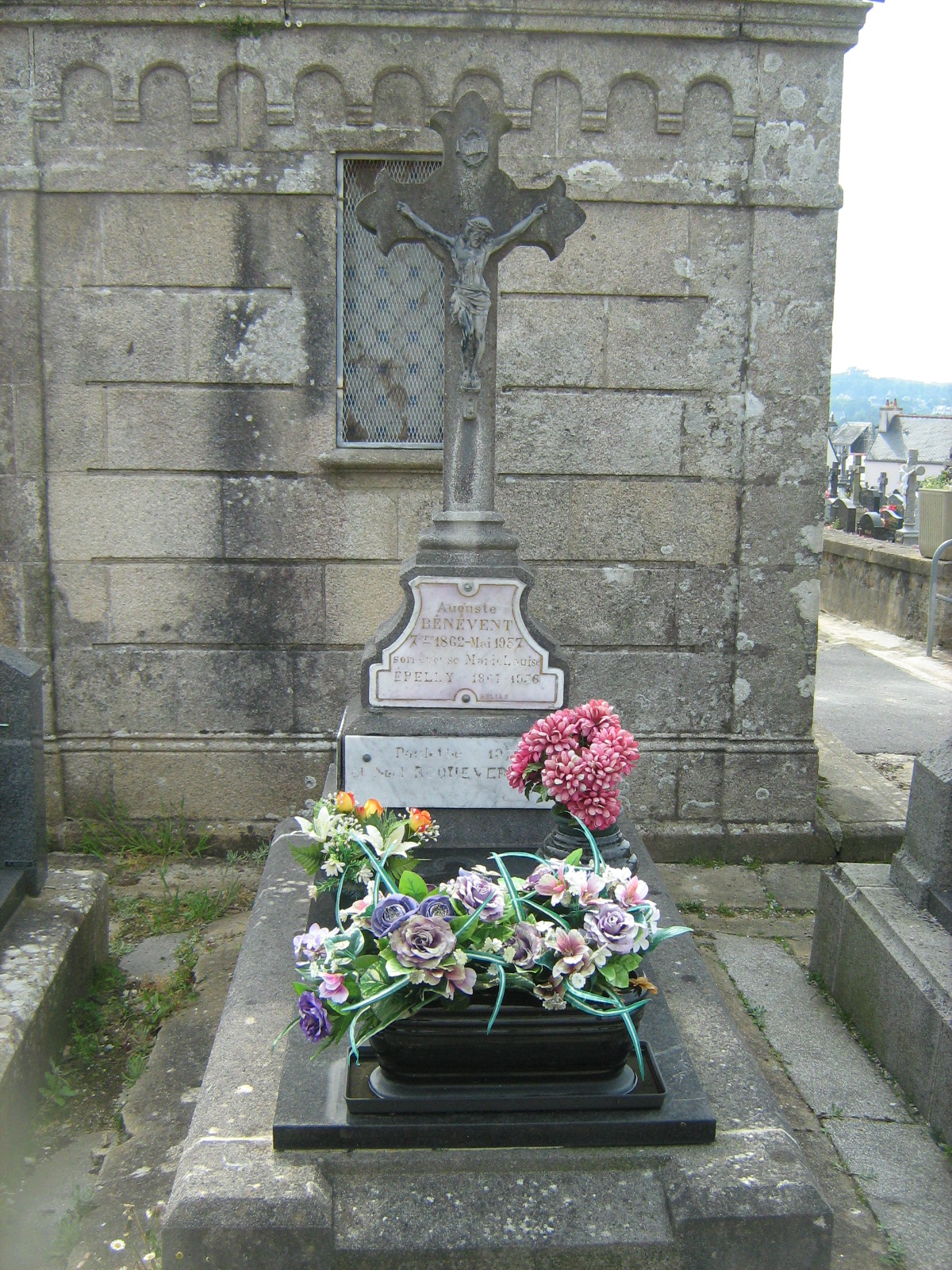
Noël Roquevert's grave in Douarnenez.

- Miarka (1937)
- Marthe Richard (1937)
- Barnabé (1938)
- Three Waltzes (1938)
- The Mayor's Dilemma (1939)
- Thérèse Martin (1939)
- The Porter from Maxim's (1939)
- Paris-New York (1940)
- Sing Anyway (1940)
- Moulin Rouge (1941)
- The Newspaper Falls at Five O'Clock (1942)
- The Blue Veil (1942)
- The Trump Card (1942)
- La Main du diable (1943)
- Le Corbeau (1943)
- Picpus (1943)
- Pierre and Jean (1943)
- The Last Penny (1946)
- The Sea Rose (1946)
- The Grand Hotel Affair (1946)
- Song of the Clouds (1946)
- The Lost Village (1947)
- Destiny Has Fun (1947)
- Something to Sing About (1947)
- Antoine and Antoinette (1947)
- Last Refuge (1947)
- Cruise for the Unknown One (1948)
- Return to Life (1949)
- Cage of Girls (1949)
- Night Round (1949)
- Du Guesclin (1949)
- Véronique (1950)
- Justice Is Done (1950)
- Beware of Blondes (1950)
- Adémaï au poteau-frontière (1950)
- Women Are Crazy (1950)
- Le Sabre de mon père (1951)
- Andalusia (1951)
- A Love Under an Umbrella (1951)
- The Dream of Andalusia (1951)
- The Passerby (1951)
- No Vacation for Mr. Mayor (1951)
- My Wife Is Formidable (1951)
- Rome-Paris-Rome (1951)
- The Prettiest Sin in the World (1951)
- The Agony of the Eagles (1952)
- Fanfan la Tulipe (1952)
- Crazy for Love (1952)
- Crimson Curtain (1952)
- She and Me (1952)
- Les Compagnes de la nuit (1953)
- Dortoir des grandes (1953)
- Capitaine Pantoufle (1953)
- My Brother from Senegal (1953)
- The Count of Monte Cristo (1954)
- The Secret of Helene Marimon (1954)
- Madame du Barry (1954)
- Cadet Rousselle (1954)
- The Sheep Has Five Legs (1954)
- It's the Paris Life (1954)
- L'impossible Monsieur Pipelet (1955)
- Black Dossier (1955)
- Madelon (1955)
- Blackmail (1955)
- Les Diaboliques (1955)
- Napoléon (1955)
- Women's Club (1956)
- The Terror with Women (1956)
- La Bande à papa (1956)
- The Whole Town Accuses (1956)
- Mademoiselle and Her Gang (1957)
- Let's Be Daring, Madame (1957)
- A Night at the Moulin Rouge (1957)
- The Law Is the Law (1958)
- It's All Adam's Fault (1958)
- Archimède le clochard (1959)
- The Gendarme of Champignol (1959)
- Marie of the Isles (1959)
- Nathalie, Secret Agent (1959)
- Certains l'aiment froide (1960)
- The Girls of La Rochelle (1962)
- How to Succeed in Love (1962)
- Cartouche (1962)
- The Mysteries of Paris (1962)
- Three Girls in Paris (1963)
- Les Veinards (1963)
- The Bamboo Stroke (1963)
- The Devil and the Ten Commandments (1963)
- The Reluctant Spy (1963)
- Your Turn, Darling (1963)
- Mad Sea (1963)
- That Tender Age (1964)
- Marvelous Angelique (1965)
- The Duke's Gold (1965)
- The Majordomo (1965)
- Line of Demarcation (1966)
- The Big Restaurant (1966)
- The Gardener of Argenteuil (1966)
- Quentin Durward (1970, TV series)
