= The Terror with Women =

1956 film

- Directed by: Jean Boyer
- Written by: René Barjavel; Raymond Castans
- Based on: Ce cochon de Morin by Guy de Maupassant
- Produced by: Frédéric Heldt; Jean Martinetti
- Starring: Noël-Noël; Jacqueline Gauthier; Yves Robert
- Cinematography: Charles Suin
- Edited by: Christian Gaudin
- Music by: René Sylviano
- Production companies: Eminente Films; Méditerrannée Cinéma Production
- Distributed by: Gaumont
- Release date: 23 November 1956
- Running time: 93 minutes
- Country: France
- Language: French

The Terror with Women (French: La terreur des dames) is a 1956 comedy film directed by Jean Boyer and starring Noël-Noël, Jacqueline Gauthier and Yves Robert. It is an adaptation of the 1882 short story Ce cochon de Morin by Guy de Maupassant, previously adapted as the 1932 film That Scoundrel Morin. The film's sets were designed by the art director Robert Giordani.

== Cast ==
- Noël-Noël as Aimé Morin
- Jacqueline Gauthier as Henriette Bonnel
- Yves Robert as Le journaliste Labarge
- Jacqueline Pagnol as Louisette
- Noël Roquevert as Bonnel
- Jean Poiret as Un gendarme
- Michel Serrault as Un gendarme
- Suzet Maïs as Madame Genlis
- Elaine Dana as La strip-teaseuse
- Fernand Sardou as Le commissaire de police

== Bibliography ==
- Dayna Oscherwitz & MaryEllen Higgins. The A to Z of French Cinema. Scarecrow Press, 2009.
