= Emile the African =

1949 film

- Directed by: Robert Vernay
- Written by: Gérard Carlier; Paul Nivoix; Herbert Victor
- Produced by: Hubert d'Achon
- Starring: Fernandel; Alexandre Rignault; Noëlle Norman
- Cinematography: Maurice Barry
- Edited by: Marthe Poncin
- Production company: Latino Consortium Cinéma
- Distributed by: Ciné Sélection
- Release date: 22 August 1949
- Running time: 85 minutes
- Country: France
- Language: French

Emile the African (French: Émile l'Africain) is a 1949 French comedy film directed by Robert Vernay and starring Fernandel, Alexandre Rignault and Noëlle Norman.

== Cast ==
- Fernandel as Émile Boulard
- Alexandre Rignault as Ladislas Stany
- Noëlle Norman as Suzanne Boulard
- Félix Oudart as Romi
- Bernard La Jarrige as Daniel Cormier
- Roland Armontel as Dibier
- Jacqueline Dor as Martine Boulard
- Madeleine Lambert as Madame Cormier
- Jean Hébey as Le clerc de notaire
- Line Dariel as Madame Zulma
- Missia as La chanteuse
- Henri Coutet as L'acteur
- André Marnay as Le notaire
- Pierre Labry as Le patron
- Sylvain as Un machiniste
- Janine Viénot as L'actrice
- Palmyre Levasseur as L'habilleuse
- Émile Riandreys
- Eugène Compain
- Marcel Meral
- Georges Sellier
- Albert Broquin as Un figurant
- Lud Germain as Bimbo

== Bibliography ==
- James Monaco. The Encyclopedia of Film. Perigee Books, 1991.
