= Mademoiselle and Her Gang =

1957 film

- Directed by: Jean Boyer
- Written by: Rodolphe-Maurice Arlaud; Jean Boyer; Serge Veber
- Produced by: Pierre Bochart; Pierre O'Connell
- Starring: Line Renaud; Noël Roquevert; Philippe Nicaud
- Cinematography: Charles Suin
- Edited by: Christian Gaudin
- Music by: Louis Gasté
- Production company: Régina
- Distributed by: Cinédis
- Release date: 12 July 1957
- Running time: 90 minutes
- Country: France
- Language: French

Mademoiselle and Her Gang (French: Mademoiselle et son gang) is a 1957 French comedy film directed by Jean Boyer and starring Line Renaud, Noël Roquevert and Philippe Nicaud. It was shot at the Billancourt Studios in Paris. The film's sets were designed by the art director Robert Giordani.

== Synopsis ==
Agnès Bourdieux the daughter of a police inspector, and a successful crime novelist under a male pseudonym, becomes leader of an inept gang of criminals.

== Cast ==
- Line Renaud as Agnès Bourdieux
- Noël Roquevert as L'inspecteur Bourdieux
- Philippe Nicaud as Paul
- Jean-Jacques Delbo as O'Connor
- Georgette Anys as Gravos
- Paul Bonifas as La patron du bistrot
- Louis Bugette as Jojo
- René-Louis Lafforgue as La Fourchette
- Max Elloy as Victor
- Jack Ary as Émile l'Africain - le troisième truand
- Henri Garcin as L'ami snob de Christian
- Raymond Gérôme as L'avocat
- André Dalibert as Marcel
- Sylvia Lopez as Marie-Christine

== Bibliography ==
- Phil Powrie & Robynn Jeananne Stilwell. Changing Tunes: The Use of Pre-existing Music in Film. Ashgate Publishing, 2006.
