= Marc Cassot =

French actor (1923–2016)

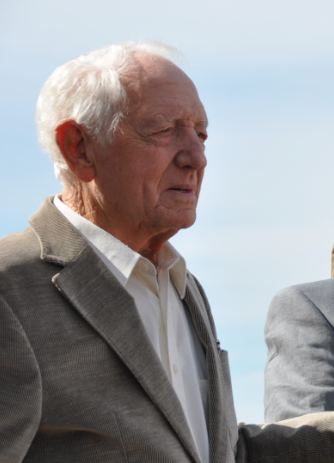
- Cassot in 2014.
- Born: 16 June 1923; Paris, France
- Died: 21 January 2016 (aged 92); Paris, France
- Occupation: Actor
- Years active: 1945-2016 (film)

Marc Cassot (1923–2016) was a French actor. He was also a prominent voice actor, dubbing foreign films for release in France.

== Selected filmography ==
- Night Warning (1946)
- The Lovers of Pont Saint Jean (1947)
- A Certain Mister (1950)
- The Most Beautiful Girl in the World (1951)
- The Love of a Woman (1953)
- Service Entrance (1954)
- The Big Flag (1954)
- The She-Wolves (1957)
- The Game of Truth (1961)
- Love Me Strangely (1971)
- Renaissance (2006)

== Bibliography ==
- Cowie, Peter & Elley, Derek . World Filmography: 1967. Fairleigh Dickinson University Press, 1977.
- Ince, Kate. Georges Franju. Manchester University Press, 2019.
