= Monsieur Fabre =

1951 film by Henri Diamant-Berger

- Directed by: Henri Diamant-Berger
- Written by: Jack Kirkland; Henri Diamant-Berger; Walter Futter
- Produced by: Raymond Borderie; Henri Diamant-Berger; Walter Futter; Walter Rupp
- Starring: Pierre Fresnay; Elina Labourdette; André Randall
- Cinematography: Claude Renoir; Horace Woodard
- Edited by: Christian Gaudin
- Music by: Hubert d'Auriol
- Production company: Compagnie Industrielle et Commerciale Cinématographique
- Distributed by: L'Alliance Générale de Distribution Cinématographique
- Release date: 14 September 1951
- Running time: 90 minutes
- Country: France
- Language: French

Monsieur Fabre is a 1951 French historical comedy film directed by Henri Diamant-Berger and starring Pierre Fresnay, Elina Labourdette and André Randall. It was produced by Diamant-Berger and Walter Futter. The film's sets were designed by the art director Robert Giordani. It was on 35mm film, in 1,37:1 format, with monophonic sound. It was released in France on 5 July 1951.

== Plot ==
It centres on the life of the entomologist Jean-Henri Fabre and his total devotion to studying insect behavior, travelling from Avignon to Paris, from Paris to his death in Sérignan. He is honoured by the French president Raymond Poincaré and his patience, obstinacy and knowledge are also recognised by Napoleon III, the publisher Charles Delagrave and the philosopher John Stuart Mill. They reach their climax in his book, Souvenirs entomologiques.

== Cast ==
- Pierre Fresnay as Henri Fabre
- Elina Labourdette as the Comtesse De Latour
- André Randall as John Stuart Mill
- Georges Tabet as the director at Avignon
- Olivier Hussenot as the 'doyen' at Avignon
- Espanita Cortez as Empress Eugénie
- Paul Bonifas as Victor Duruy
- Jacques Emmanuel as Charles Delagrave
- Albert Cullaz as Jules Fabre
- France Descaut as Antonia Fabre
- Hubert Noël as Antonia's lover
- Catherine Cullaz as Claire Fabre
- Jean-Pierre Maurin (as J. P. Maurin) as Napoléon, Prince Imperial
- Elisabeth Hardy as Marie Fabre
- Pierre Bertin as Napoléon III
- Solange Varenne as second woman
- Patrick Dewaere as Émile

== Crew ==
- Director : Henri Diamant-Berger
- Screenplay : Henri Diamant-Berger and Jack Kirkland
- Adaptation and dialogue : Henri Diamant-Berger and Jack Kirkland
- Sets : Robert Giordani
- Costumes : Rosine Delamare
- Photography : Claude Renoir and Horace Woodard
- Sound : William-Robert Sivel
- Film editing: Christian Gaudin
- Music : Hubert d'Auriol
- Producer: Raymond Borderie
- Production : CICC, UGC, Films d'Art and Fidès
- Production Director : Walter Rupp
