= Renaud Mary =

French actor (1918–1977)

- Born: 31 July 1918; Bordeaux, Gironde, France
- Died: 5 May 1977 (aged 58); Saint-Maur-des-Fosses, France
- Occupation: Actor
- Years active: 1942–1976 (film & TV)
- Spouse: Renée Faure

Renaud Mary (31 July 1918 – 5 May 1977) was a French stage and film actor.

== Filmography ==
Year	Title	Role	Notes
1942	Le Destin fabuleux de Désirée Clary	Antomarchi	
1944	Coup de tête		Uncredited
1946	The Misfortunes of Sophie	Armand Hugon	
1946	Dropped from Heaven	Raymond	
1947	Les jeux sont faits	Un milicien	
1947	Fantômas	Germain	
1948	Cruise for the Unknown One	Le sous-directeur	
1948	Dark Sunday	Charles Perrin	
1948	Sombre Dimanche	César	
1949	The Wolf	Rémi	
1950	The Little Zouave	Eugène	
1951	Paris Vice Squad	Maurice Petrosino - un prévenu	
1951	The Most Beautiful Girl in the World	Alberto	
1951	Les Mousquetaires du roi		
1953	The Three Musketeers	Richelieu	
1953	Rhine Virgin	Maurice Labbé	
1954	The Unfrocked One	L'antiquaire	
1954	Huis clos	Le réceptionniste de l'hôtel	
1955	The Price of Love	Fernando	
1955	Pas de souris dans le business	Georges de Valtourgis	
1955	The Affair of the Poisons	Henri de Montespan	
1955	Lord Rogue	Harel	
1956	Le secret de soeur Angèle	Commissaire Morin	
1956	Elena and Her Men	Fleury	
1957	The Adventures of Arsène Lupin	Paul Desfontaines	
1957	Charming Boys	Henri	
1958	La Tour, prends garde !	Pérouge	
1960	Sergeant X	Capt. Robert	
1960	Recours en grâce	Paulier	
1960	Dialogue of the Carmelites	Fouquier-Tinville	
1960	Coctail party	Sir Henry Harcourt-Reilly	
1960	Women Are Like That	Demur	
1961	Bernadette of Lourdes	Monseigneur Forcade evêque de Nevers	
1961	Amazons of Rome	Stravos	
1961	Madame	Fouché	
1962	Le Crime ne paie pas	Mon. Lenormand	Uncredited
1963	Mathias Sandorf	Sarcany	
1966	A nous deux, Paris!	Pierre Haguenauer	
1972	L'oeuf	L'avocat général	

== Bibliography ==
- Thomas C. Renzi. Jules Verne on Film: A Filmography of the Cinematic Adaptations of His Works, 1902 Through 1997. McFarland, 1998.
