= Death No Longer Awaits =

1944 film

- Directed by: Jean Tarride
- Written by: René Jolivet; Roger Vitrac
- Produced by: Jacques Sicre
- Starring: Jules Berry; Jacqueline Gauthier; Gérard Landry
- Cinematography: Fred Langenfeld
- Edited by: Henri Taverna
- Music by: André Theurer
- Production company: Société Cinématographique Méditerranéenne de Production
- Distributed by: Union Française de Production Cinématographique
- Release date: 7 July 1944
- Running time: 100 minutes
- Country: France
- Language: French

Death No Longer Awaits (French: Le mort ne reçoit plus) is a 1944 French crime film directed by Jean Tarride and starring Jules Berry, Jacqueline Gauthier and Gérard Landry. It was shot at the Saint-Laurent-du-Var Studios and Victorine Studios in Nice. The film's sets were designed by the art director Georges Wakhévitch.

== Synopsis ==
The relatives of Jérôme Armandy gather at his château in Provence to hear the reading of his will, with the prospect of an inheritance of seventeen million francs hidden away on the property. Several unexpected events occur to the guests including a murder and the dramatic reappearance of the supposedly dead Jérôme.

== Cast ==
- Jules Berry as Jérôme Armandy
- Jacqueline Gauthier as Jeanne Dumont
- Gérard Landry as Claude Desbordes
- Jacques Louvigny as Firmin
- Thérèse Dorny as Mademoiselle Verdelier
- Félix Oudart as Alexandre
- Madeleine Suffel as Madame Marchal
- Jacques Tarride as Le juge Armandy
- Georges Lannes as Le procureur
- Raymond Aimos as Raymond le raccourci
- Janine Merrey as Mme Bonnemain
- Simone Signoret as La maîtresse de Firmin

== Bibliography ==
- Hayward, Susan. Simone Signoret: The Star as Cultural Sign. Continuum, 2004.
- Rège, Philippe. Encyclopedia of French Film Directors, Volume 1. Scarecrow Press, 2009.
