= Mathias Sandorf (1963 film) =

- Directed by: Georges Lampin
- Written by: Gérard Carlier; Georges Lampin; Juan Marxe; Charles Spaak
- Based on: Mathias Sandorf by Jules Verne
- Produced by: Francisco Molero
- Starring: Louis Jourdan; Renaud Mary; Francisco Rabal
- Cinematography: Cecilio Paniagua
- Edited by: Henri Taverna
- Music by: Joe Hajos
- Production companies: Société Française de Cinématographie; La Société des Films Sirius; Domiziana Internazionale Cinematografica
- Distributed by: Variety Distribution
- Release date: 13 February 1963
- Running time: 105 minutes
- Countries: France; Italy; Spain
- Language: French

Mathias Sandorf is a 1963 historical adventure film directed by Georges Lampin and starring Louis Jourdan, Renaud Mary and Francisco Rabal. Made as a co-production between France, Italy and Spain it is based on the 1885 novel of the same title by Jules Verne.

The film's sets were designed by the art director Maurice Colasson. It was shot at studios in Barcelona and the Billancourt Studios in Paris.

== Cast ==
- Louis Jourdan as Le comte Mathias Sandorf
- Renaud Mary as Sarcany
- Francisco Rabal as Frédéric de Rotenbourg
- Serena Vergano as Elisabeth Sandorf
- Antoine Balpêtré as Professor Ernst Bathory
- Bernard Blier as Toronthal
- Valeria Fabrizi as Helene
- Antonio Casas as Zathmar
- Xan das Bolas as Carpena
- Carlos Mendy as Ferrato
- Daniel Cauchy as Pescade
- Carl Studer as Matifou
- Claudio Gora as Procureur

== Bibliography ==
- Dayna Oscherwitz & MaryEllen Higgins. The A to Z of French Cinema. Scarecrow Press, 2009.
