= La Bande à papa =

La Bande à Papa
- Directed by: Guy Lefranc
- Written by: Roger Pierre; Frédéric Dard
- Produced by: Cinéphonic - Société Générale de Gestion Cinématographique - Pathé Cinéma (France)
- Starring: Fernand Raynaud; Louis de Funès
- Cinematography: Pierre Petit
- Music by: Marcel Delannoy
- Distributed by: Pathé Consortium
- Release date: 7 March 1956 (France)
- Running time: 90 minutes
- Country: France
- Language: French

La Bande à Papa English: The Band of Papa, is a French comedy film from 1956, directed by Guy Lefranc, written by Roger Pierre, starring Fernand Raynaud and Louis de Funès. The film is known under the titles "La bande à papa" Belgium French title), "De bende van papa" (Belgium Dutch title).

== Cast ==
- Fernand Raynaud: Fernand Jérôme, Joseph's son, employee at "Crédit Populaire"
- Louis de Funès: chief commissioner Victor Eugène Merlerin
- Noël Roquevert: bandleader Joseph Jérôme aka "Grand J"
- Jean-Marc Tennberg: "toupee", band member
- Henri Crémieux: "professeur", band member
- Annie Noël: Renée Merlerin, the commissioner's daughter who is in love with Fernand
- Suzanne Dehelly: Gertrude, Fernand's grandmother
- Madeleine Barbulée: Mrs Merlerin, the commissioner's wife
- Geneviève Morel: the street vendor
- Marcel Bozzuffi: "Volaille", band member
- Paul Crauchet: Marcel, band member
- Pierre Duncan: Jo, band member
- Gaston Orbal: "the suit"
