= His Excellency Antonin =

1935 film

- Directed by: Charles-Félix Tavano
- Written by: Jean Deyrmon; René Pujol
- Produced by: Pierre Gurgo-Salice; Charles-Félix Tavano
- Starring: Raymond Cordy; Josette Day; Robert Pizani
- Cinematography: Scarciafico Hugo
- Edited by: Maurice Serein
- Music by: Vincent Scotto
- Production company: Lux Compagnie Cinématographique de France
- Distributed by: Pathé Consortium Cinéma
- Release date: 7 June 1935
- Running time: 80 minutes
- Country: France
- Language: French

His Excellency Antonin (French: Son excellence Antonin) is a 1935 French comedy film directed by Charles-Félix Tavano and starring Raymond Cordy, Josette Day and Robert Pizani. The film's sets were designed by the art director Robert Gys.

== Synopsis ==
Antonin, a lowly dishwasher working at a grand hotel, wins seven million francs on the lottery. Suddenly he is feted by his colleagues and his manager throws a party in his honour and wishes him to marry his daughter. A baron staying at the hotel educates Antonin in stylish manners. Three different people claim to be Antonin's long-lost father in order to get a share of the money. In despair, Antonin announces he has lost the ticket. At once his new friends all abandon him and only Betty a maid at the hotel stays with him.

== Cast ==
- Raymond Cordy as Antonin
- Josette Day as Betty
- Robert Pizani as le baron
- André Berley as le propriétaire de l'hôtel
- Jeanne Helbling as l'intrigante
- Thérèse Kolb as la mère
- Germaine Reuver as la patronne
- Sylvia Bataille

== Bibliography ==
- Bessy, Maurice & Chirat, Raymond. Histoire du cinéma français: 1935-1939. Pygmalion, 1986.
- Crisp, Colin. Genre, Myth and Convention in the French Cinema, 1929-1939. Indiana University Press, 2002.
- Rège, Philippe. Encyclopedia of French Film Directors, Volume 1. Scarecrow Press, 2009.
