= Two Loves (1949 film) =

1949 film

- Directed by: Richard Pottier
- Written by: Jean-Pierre Feydeau; Yves Mirande
- Produced by: Albert Dodrumez; Mario Bruitte; Edouard Harispuru
- Starring: Tino Rossi; Simone Valère; Édouard Delmont
- Cinematography: André Germain
- Edited by: Martine Velle
- Music by: Henri Bourtayre; Raymond Legrand
- Production company: Compagnie Commerciale Française Cinématographique
- Distributed by: Compagnie Commerciale Française Cinématographique
- Release date: 5 January 1949
- Running time: 90 minutes
- Country: France
- Language: French

Two Loves (French: Deux amours) is a 1949 French comedy film directed by Richard Pottier and starring Tino Rossi, Simone Valère and Édouard Delmont.

The film's sets were designed by the art director Paul-Louis Boutié.

== Cast ==
- Tino Rossi as Sylvain Vincent / Désiré Vincent
- Simone Valère as Antoinette
- Édouard Delmont as M. Vincent
- Sylvie as Mme Vincent
- André Gabriello as Caldebrousse
- Jeanne Fusier-Gir as Poucette Caldebrousse
- André Brunot as Nestor, directeur du cirque
- Louis Florencie as Le maire
- Henri Arius as Un client
- Christiane Barry as Carmen
- José Casa as Un client
- Edith Cora as Anaïs
- Camille Guérini as Le régisseur
- Mag-Avril as Une commère
- Marcel Maupi as Dominique
- Geneviève Morel as Clémentine

== Bibliography ==
- Phil Powrie & Marie Cadalanu. The French Film Musical. Bloomsbury Publishing, 2020.
