= André Randall =

French actor (1893–1974)

- Born: 9 December 1892
- Died: 4 July 1974 (aged 81)

André Randall (9 December 1892 – 4 July 1974) was a French screen actor. He was born André Ayaïs in Bordeaux and died at Sainte-Foy-la-Grande.

== Filmography ==
- 1919: The Odds Against Her (directed by Alexander Butler)
- 1931: Mistigri (directed by Harry Lachmann)
- 1935: L'Heureuse Aventure (directed by Jean Georgescu) - Joe Wilkins - le pasteur
- 1943: The Butler's Dilemma (directed by Leslie S. Hiscott) - Vitello
- 1944: English Without Tears (directed by Harold French) - Dutch Officer
- 1945: The Man from Morocco (directed by Mutz Greenbaum) - French General
- 1948: Mademoiselle Has Fun (directed by Jean Boyer) - William Gibson
- 1948: The Lame Devil (directed by Sacha Guitry) - Lord Grey
- 1951: Monsieur Fabre (directed by Henri Diamant-Berger) - Le philosophe John Stuart Mill
- 1951: Atoll K (directed by Léo Joannon) - Branwell
- 1957: Les Lavandières du Portugal (directed by Pierre Gaspard-Huit) - Antoine Molinié
- 1960: Austerlitz (directed by Abel Gance) - Whitworth
- 1961: Aimez-vous Brahms ? (directed by Anatole Litvak) - Mr. Steiner (final film role)
