= Song of the Clouds =

1946 film

- Directed by: André Cayatte
- Written by: André Cayatte; Jacques Natanson; Richard Pottier
- Produced by: Édouard Harispuru; Mario Bruitte; Albert Dodrumez
- Starring: Tino Rossi; Jacqueline Gauthier; Jacques Louvigny
- Cinematography: Charles Bauer
- Edited by: Christian Gaudin
- Music by: Vincent Scotto
- Production company: Union des Distributeurs Indépendants
- Distributed by: Compagnie Commerciale Française Cinématographique
- Release date: 6 March 1946
- Running time: 103 minutes
- Country: France
- Language: French

Song of the Clouds (French: Sérénade aux nuages) is a 1946 French comedy film directed by André Cayatte and starring Tino Rossi, Jacqueline Gauthier and Jacques Louvigny.

It was shot at the Marseille Studios of Marcel Pagnol in Southern France. The film's sets were designed by the art directors Auguste Capelier and Georges Wakhévitch. It was one of the most popular movies in France in 1945 with admissions of 3,498,968.

== Cast ==
- Tino Rossi as Sylvio
- Jacqueline Gauthier as Gracieuse
- Jacques Louvigny as L'imprésario de Sylvio
- Maximilienne as Mademoiselle Anaïs
- Noël Roquevert as Le comte Fabrice
- Pierre Larquey as Le jardinier du château
- Clairette Oddera as La postière du village
- Maurice Teynac
- Camille Guérini
- Guy Decomble
- Germaine Gerlata
- Albert Duvaleix
- Luce Fabiole

== Bibliography ==
- Crisp, Colin. French Cinema—A Critical Filmography: Volume 2, 1940–1958. Indiana University Press, 2015.
