= One Night at the Tabarin =

1947 film

- Directed by: Karel Lamac
- Written by: Ernst Neubach; André Tabet; Herbert Victor
- Produced by: Ernst Neubach
- Starring: Jacqueline Gauthier; Robert Dhéry; Jean Parédès
- Cinematography: Charles Bauer
- Edited by: Tonka Taldy
- Music by: Robert Stolz
- Production company: Pen Films
- Distributed by: Filmsonor
- Release date: 31 December 1947
- Running time: 85 minutes
- Country: France
- Language: French

One Night at the Tabarin (French: Une nuit à Tabarin) is a 1947 French comedy film directed by Karel Lamac and starring Jacqueline Gauthier, Robert Dhéry and Jean Parédès. The film's sets were designed by the art director Roland Berthon.

== Synopsis ==
In Paris André de Lurvine demands the closure of the cabaret nightclub Bal Tabarin on moral grounds. Seeking revenge the dying owner bequeaths the business to him. Won over by the place, and particularly the star Cora, he begins to reverse his opinion.

== Cast ==
- Jacqueline Gauthier as Cora
- Robert Dhéry as André de Lurvine
- Jean Parédès as Jean
- Margo Lion as Marie Girard
- Denise Bosc as Micheline
- Félix Oudart as Georges Laurent
- Jeannette Batti as Jeannette
- Maxime Fabert as Le notaire
- Guy-Lou as Morel
- Jean Hébey as Le speaker
- Marcel Maupi as Le maître de ballet
- Gaston Orbal as L'ami de Lurvine
- René Pascal as Le docteur
- Jean Sinoël as Roupillac

== Bibliography ==
- Bock, Hans-Michael & Bergfelder, Tim. The Concise Cinegraph: Encyclopaedia of German Cinema. Berghahn Books, 2009.
- Rège, Philippe. Encyclopedia of French Film Directors, Volume 1. Scarecrow Press, 2009.
