= Christiane Barry =

French actress (1918–1992)

- Born: 18 August 1918; Paris, France
- Died: 24 September 1992 (aged 74); Paris, France
- Occupation: Actress
- Years active: 1943-1985 (film)

Christiane Fernande Boursaud (1918–1992) was a French stage and film actress.

== Filmography ==
| Year | Title | Role | Notes |
|---|---|---|---|
| 1943 | Angels of Sin | Soeur Blaise | |
| 1944 | Bonsoir mesdames, bonsoir messieurs | La sécretaire de Morizot | |
| 1945 | Paris Frills | Lucienne | |
| 1948 | Mademoiselle Has Fun | Édith | |
| 1948 | The Last Vacation | Tante Odette | |
| 1949 | Two Loves | Carmen | |
| 1949 | Scandal on the Champs-Élysées | Jacqueline | |
| 1950 | L'auberge du péché | La Follette | |
| 1950 | The Atomic Monsieur Placido | Une comédienne | |
| 1951 | The Billionaire Tramp | Colette | |
| 1951 | La vie chantée | L'épouse légitime | |
| 1951 | Rendezvous in Grenada | La pompiste | |
| 1951 | Great Man | Jacqueline | |
| 1952 | Monsieur Leguignon, Signalman | Louise - l'assistante sociale | |
| 1952 | The Happiest of Men | Florence Dupuis-Martin | |
| 1953 | Endless Horizons | Jacqueline | |
| 1955 | More Whiskey for Callaghan | Comtesse Haragos | |
| 1959 | Le petit prof | Mme. Aubin | |
| 1961 | The President | | |
| 1961 | Prey for the Shadows | Mme Interlenghi | |
| 1972 | What? | Dresser | |
| 1982 | Le corbillard de Jules | | |

== Bibliography ==
- Cowie, Peter. International Film Guide: 1973. Tantivy Press, 1973.
