= Miarka (1937 film) =

- Directed by: Jean Choux
- Written by: Jean Richepin (novel); Émile Roussel; Georges Vally]Fernand Crommelynck; Jean Choux
- Produced by: Simon Barstoff
- Starring: Suzanne Desprès; Marcel Dalio; José Noguéro
- Cinematography: Nicolas Hayer
- Edited by: Charlotte Guilbert
- Music by: Tibor Harsanyi; Arthur Honegger; Francis Poulenc
- Production company: S.B. Films
- Distributed by: Les Films Vog
- Release date: 29 December 1937
- Running time: 102 minutes
- Country: France
- Language: French

Miarka (French title: Miarka, la fille à l'ourse) is a 1937 French drama film directed by Jean Choux and starring Suzanne Desprès, Marcel Dalio and José Noguéro. The film based on the 1883 novel Miarka by Jean Richepin, which had previously been turned into a 1920 silent film.

== Cast ==
- Suzanne Desprès as Sara
- Marcel Dalio as Le maire
- José Noguéro as Luigi
- Rama-Tahé as Miarka
- Marcel Vallée as Le maître d'école
- Roger Legris as L'innocent
- Jeanne Fusier-Gir as La gouvernante
- Jean Toulout as Le garde-champêtre
- Arthur Devère
- Elmire Vautier as La soeur de l'innocent
- Félix Oudart as Le curé
- Freddie Bernard as Luigi enfant
- Nutzi Ipceanu as Une gitane
- Noël Roquevert
- Carmencita Vallejo as Miarka enfant

== Bibliography ==
- Spratt, Geoffrey K. The Music of Arthur Honegger. Cork University Press, 1987.
