= Fernandel the Dressmaker =

1956 film

- Directed by: Jean Boyer
- Written by: Jean Boyer; Gérard Carlier; Jean Manse; Serge Veber
- Produced by: Jacques Bar; Josette Trachsler
- Starring: Fernandel; Suzy Delair; Fred Pasquali
- Cinematography: Charles Suin
- Edited by: Christian Gaudin
- Music by: Paul Misraki
- Production companies: Cité Films; Compagnie Internationale de Productions Cinématographiques
- Distributed by: Cinédis
- Release date: 13 April 1956
- Running time: 95 minutes
- Country: France
- Language: French

Fernandel the Dressmaker (French: Le Couturier de ces dames) is a 1956 French comedy film directed by Jean Boyer and starring Fernandel, Suzy Delair and Fred Pasquali. It was shot at the Saint-Maurice Studios in Paris and on location in the city's Place du Trocadéro. The film's sets were designed by the art director Robert Giordani.

== Cast ==
- Fernandel as Fernand Vignard
- Suzy Delair as Adrienne Vignard
- Fred Pasquali as Picrafos
- Françoise Fabian as Sophie
- André Bervil as Apollini
- Gaston Orbal as Le Comte de Treignac
- Robert Pizani as Le Baron
- Georges Chamarat as Maitre Plaisant
- Robert Destain as Zwertas
- Robert Lombard as Bernheim
- Raymond Bour as M. Bodunet
- Manuel Gary as Clément
- Ginette Pigeon as La Première

== Bibliography ==
- Oscherwitz, Dayna & Higgins, MaryEllen. The A to Z of French Cinema. Scarecrow Press, 2009.
- Parish, James Robert. Film Actors Guide: Western Europe. Scarecrow Press, 1977.
- Rège, Philippe. Encyclopedia of French Film Directors, Volume 1. Scarecrow Press, 2009.
