= Crazy for Love =

1952 film

- Directed by: Jean Boyer
- Written by: Jean Boyer; Arlette de Pitray
- Produced by: Jacques Bar
- Starring: Bourvil; Jane Marken; Brigitte Bardot
- Cinematography: Charles Suin
- Edited by: Fanchette Mazin
- Music by: Paul Misraki
- Production company: Cité Films
- Distributed by: Victory Films
- Release date: 7 November 1952
- Running time: 85 minutes
- Country: France
- Language: French
- Box office: 3,915,583 admissions (France)

Crazy for Love (French: Le Trou normand) is a 1952 French comedy film directed by Jean Boyer and starring Bourvil, Jane Marken and, in one of her first appearances, Brigitte Bardot. Location shooting took place around Conches-en-Ouche in Normandy. The film's sets were designed by the art director Robert Giordani. The film's French title is a reference to an aperitif of Calvados drunk between meals, which also features as the name of the film's disputed tavern.

== Synopsis ==
The naive, simpleton countrymen Hippolyte inherits his uncle's inn in Normandy on the condition that he gain his primary school certificate. However his aunt Augustine, who stands to inherit if he does not, sets out to thwart his attempts to do so.

== Cast ==
- Bourvil as Hippolyte Lemoine
- Jane Marken as Augustine Lemoine
- Brigitte Bardot as Javotte Lemoine
- Jeanne Fusier-Gir as Maria Courtaine
- Roger Pierre as Jean Marco
- Pierre Larquey as Testu
- Nadine Basile as Madeleine Pichet
- Noël Roquevert as Dr. Aubert
- Jacques Deray as Duval
- Georges Baconnet as Pichet
- Albert Duvaleix as Le notaire
- Marcel Charvey as L'automobiliste snob
- Florence Michael as Louisette
- Janine Clairville as La serveuse de la charcuterie
- René Worms as Le préfet
- Léon Berton as Le clerc
- André Dalibert as Firmin, un paysan
- Marcel Meral as Un paysan
- Jean-Pierre Lorrain as Un paysan

== Bibliography ==
- Lanzoni, Rémi Fournier . French Cinema: From Its Beginnings to the Present. A&C Black, 2004.
