= Gérard Carlier =

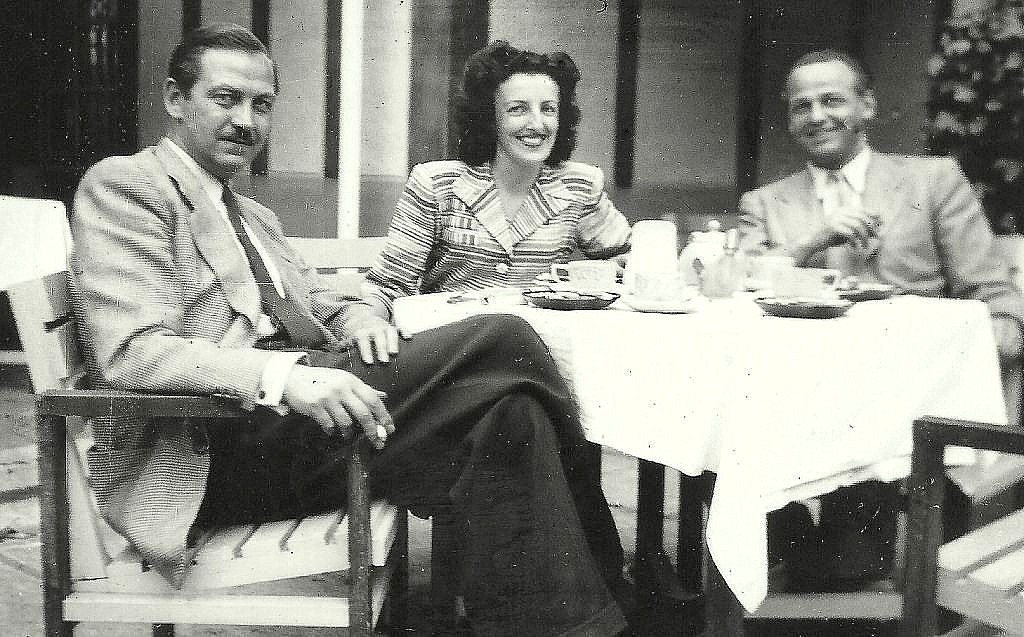
- Carlier (left) with Irène Élisabeth Reinert and Joe Hajos
- Born: 20 December 1905; Konigsberg, East Prussia, German Empire
- Died: 7 November 1975 (aged 69); Paris, France
- Other name: Gerd Karlick
- Occupation: Writer
- Years active: 1939-1966 (film)

Gérard Carlier (1905–1975), born Eugen Artur Gerhard "Gerd" Karlick was a German-born French songwriter and screenwriter. He wrote songs for the Comedian Harmonists in Berlin, then moved to France and worked on several scripts for films starring the comedian Fernandel in the postwar era.

== Selected songs ==
- "Ich hab für Dich 'nen Blumentopf bestellt" (Bootz/Karlick) – 1930
- "Wie schnell vergißt man, was einmal war" (Bootz/Karlick) – 1931
- "Reg' Dich nicht auf, wenn mal was schief geht" (Bootz/Karlick) – 1931
- "Hasch' mich, mein Liebling, hasch' mich" (Glanzberg/Karlick) – 1931
- "Einmal wird Dein Herz mir gehören" (Glanzberg/Karlick) – 1931
- "Schöne Isabella aus Kastilien" (Bootz/Karlick) – 1932
- "Die ersten Blumen im Mai" (Tango) – 1932
- "Ich bin so scharf auf Erika" (Foxtrot) (Bootz/Karlick)
- "Wenn die Sonja russisch tanzt"

== Selected filmography ==
- Three from St Cyr (1939)
- The Blue Danube (1940)
- Dorothy Looks for Love (1945)
- Dropped from Heaven (1946)
- Judicial Error (1948)
- Brilliant Waltz (1949)
- The Heroic Monsieur Boniface (1949)
- Emile the African (1949)
- Fandango (1949)
- Casimir (1950)
- Rendezvous in Grenada (1951)
- The Sleepwalker (1951)
- My Wife, My Cow and Me (1952)
- The Last Robin Hood (1953)
- April Fools' Day (1954)
- Fernandel the Dressmaker (1956)
- Good King Dagobert (1963)
- Mathias Sandorf (1963)
- Four Queens for an Ace (1966)

== Bibliography ==
- Kris Van Heuckelom. Polish Migrants in European Film 1918–2017. Springer, 2019.
- Georg Maria von Coellen. Texte und Musik nach Maß. Gerd Karlick in Der Artist, No. 2569 vol 14. March 1935.
