= At Your Command, Madame =

1942 film

- Directed by: Jean Boyer
- Written by: André Birabeau (story); Jean Boyer; Yves Mirande
- Produced by: Raymond Borderie; Ferdinand Liffran; Adrien Remaugé
- Starring: Jean Tissier; Suzanne Dehelly; Jacqueline Gauthier
- Cinematography: Nicolas Hayer
- Edited by: Mireille Bessette
- Music by: Georges Van Parys
- Production company: Pathé Consortium Cinéma
- Distributed by: Pathé Consortium Cinéma
- Release date: 16 October 1942
- Running time: 91 minutes
- Country: France
- Language: French

At Your Command, Madame (French: À vos ordres, Madame) is a 1942 French comedy film directed by Jean Boyer and starring Jean Tissier, Suzanne Dehelly and Jacqueline Gauthier. It is based on a story by André Birabeau. It was made by Pathé at the company's Francoeur Studios in Paris. The film's sets were designed by the art director Lucien Aguettand.

== Synopsis ==
When their car breaks down in the country, a couple have to stay at a nearby luxury hotel. Despite being well-off, the miserly wife takes advantage of a special offer to get her husband a cheap room by pretending he is her chauffeur while taking an expensive one for herself as a "baroness". Complications ensue however when a chambermaid begins to fall for her husband, while she herself is courted by one of the guests.

== Cast ==
- Jean Tissier as Hector Dupuis
- Suzanne Dehelly as Odette Dupuis
- Jacqueline Gauthier as Angèle
- Jacques Louvigny as Monsieur Palureau
- Albert Duvaleix as Le portier
- Gaby Wagner as La cocotte du 27
- Pierre Labry as Le mécanicien-chef
- Jean-Louis Allibert as Le directeur de l'hôtel
- Nane Germon as Léa
- Gaston Modot as Le garçon d'étage
- Léonce Corne as Victor
- Agnès Raynal as Rose Palureau
- Alfred Adam as Ferdinand - le chauffeur de Palureau

== Bibliography ==
- Goble, Alan. The Complete Index to Literary Sources in Film. Walter de Gruyter, 1999.
