= Eve and the Serpent =

1949 film

- Directed by: Charles-Félix Tavano
- Written by: Solange Térac
- Produced by: Louis Brunet; Charles-Félix Tavano
- Starring: Gaby Morlay; Félix Oudart; Jacqueline Gauthier
- Cinematography: Raymond Clunie
- Edited by: Georges Arnstam
- Music by: Henri Goublier; Francis Lopez
- Production company: Aurore Films
- Distributed by: Tamasa Distribution
- Release date: 8 December 1949
- Running time: 95 minutes
- Country: France
- Language: French

Eve and the Serpent (French: Ève et le serpent) is a 1949 French comedy film directed by Charles-Félix Tavano and starring Gaby Morlay, Félix Oudart and Jacqueline Gauthier.

== Cast ==
- Gaby Morlay as Laurence Barrois
- Félix Oudart as Monsieur Grombat
- Jacqueline Gauthier as Louisette
- Robert Moncade as Georges
- Marguerite Deval as Madame Béchut
- Jean Lanier as Le notaire
- Eliane Saint-Jean as Suzon
- Albert Michel as Le valet de chambre
- Hélène Garaud as Madame Ancelin
- Raymond Pélissier as L'impresario
- Palmyre Levasseur as Marinette
- Suzanne Nivette as Madame Léonie
- Antonin Baryel as Le domestique

== Bibliography ==
- Dayna Oscherwitz & MaryEllen Higgins. The A to Z of French Cinema. Scarecrow Press, 2009.
