= She and Me =

1952 film by Guy Lefranc

- Theatrical release poster
- French: Elle et moi
- Directed by: Guy Lefranc
- Screenplay by: Michel Audiard; Jean Duché
- Based on: Elle et lui by Jean Duché
- Produced by: Jacques Roitfeld
- Starring: François Périer; Dany Robin; Jacqueline Gauthier; Jean Carmet; Noël Roquevert
- Cinematography: Louis Page
- Edited by: Monique Kirsanoff
- Music by: Paul Misraki
- Production companies: Les Productions Jacques Roitfeld; Les Films Sirius
- Distributed by: Les Films Sirius
- Release date: 31 December 1952 (France)
- Running time: 101 minutes
- Country: France
- Language: French

She and Me (French: Elle et moi) is a 1952 French comedy film directed by Guy Lefranc from a screenplay by Michel Audiard and Jean Duché, based on Duché's 1952 novel Elle et lui. It stars François Périer and Dany Robin, with Jacqueline Gauthier, Jean Carmet and Noël Roquevert. The film's sets were designed by art director Robert Clavel.

== Cast ==
- François Périer as Jean Montaigu
- Dany Robin as Juliette Capulet
- Jean Carmet as Gaston, Jean's friend
- Jacqueline Gauthier as Irène Duval (nicknamed "Biquette")
- Noël Roquevert as Mr Belhomme, the eccentric owner
- Paul Faivre as Jean's uncle
- Suzanne Courtal as Marie, Jean's aunt
- Michel Nastorg as Juliette's father
- Suzanne Guémard as Juliette's mother
- Louis de Funès as café waiter
- Jean Sylvain as mayor
- Geneviève Morel as tobacconist
