= The Lovers of Pont Saint Jean =

1947 film

- Directed by: Henri Decoin
- Written by: Jean Aurenche; René Wheeler
- Produced by: Gustave Jif; Adolphe-Abraham Landau
- Starring: Michel Simon; Gaby Morlay; Nadine Alari
- Cinematography: Jacques Lemare
- Edited by: Yvonne Martin
- Music by: Henri Verdun
- Production company: D.U.C.
- Distributed by: Les Films Fernand Rivers
- Release date: 24 December 1947
- Running time: 92 minutes
- Country: France
- Language: French

The Lovers of Pont Saint Jean (French: Les Amants du pont Saint-Jean) is a 1947 French comedy drama film directed by Henri Decoin and starring Michel Simon, Gaby Morlay and Nadine Alari. It was entered into the 1947 Cannes Film Festival. It was filmed at the Boulogne Studios near Paris while location shooting took place on the River Rhône, including in La Roche-de-Glun (Drôme). The film's sets were designed by the art director Emile Alex.

== Plot ==
Pilou and Augusta are in love, but Augusta's father, the conservative mayor of the city, does not look upon their relationship kindly. His reprobation is directed less at the boy himself than at his parents, Maryse and Alcide Garonne, who are living together unmarried. Pilou and Augusta run away, and the mayor finally accept their union provided that the Pilou's parents regularize their situation through marriage. This they do, but after their marriage, the lovers separate. Finally, Pilou's mother falls and dies on the bank of the Rhone, and Alcide, overwhelmed with grief, throws himself into the river.

== Cast ==
- Michel Simon as Garonne
- Gaby Morlay as Maryse
- Nadine Alari as Augusta
- Odette Barencey as Amélie
- Pauline Carton as Tante Marguerite
- Marc Cassot as Pilou
- René-Jean Chauffard
- André Darnay as Doiren
- Pierre Darteuil as Rival
- Pierre Ferval
- Paul Frankeur as Girard
- René Génin as Labique
- Camille Guérini as Le brigadier
- Geneviève Morel as La bonne
- Madeleine Suffel as La parente
- Gamil Ratib as uncredited

== Bibliography ==
- Sieglohr, Ulrike (ed.) Heroines Without Heroes: Reconstructing Female and National Identities in European Cinema, 1945-51. Bloomsbury Publishing, 2016.
