= Rhine Virgin =

1953 film

- Directed by: Gilles Grangier
- Written by: Jacques Sigurd
- Based on: La vierge du Rhin by Pierre Nord
- Produced by: Evrard de Rouvre
- Starring: Jean Gabin; Nadia Gray; Elina Labourdette
- Cinematography: Marc Fossard
- Edited by: Paul Cayatte
- Music by: Joseph Kosma
- Production company: Films Véga
- Distributed by: La Société des Films Sirius
- Release date: 13 November 1953
- Running time: 82 minutes
- Country: France
- Language: French

Rhine Virgin (French: La vierge du Rhin) is a 1953 French crime drama film directed by Gilles Grangier and starring Jean Gabin, Nadia Gray and Elina Labourdette. The film's sets were designed by the art directors Jacques Colombier and Jean André. The film was shot at the Billancourt Studios in Paris and on location along the River Rhine, including around Strasbourg. It was part of a string of post-war films in which Gabin plays a tragic lover.

== Synopsis ==
During the Fall of France in 1940 during the Second World War Jacques Ledru is reported missing in action. His wife Geneviève has taken over his Strasbourg-based river transport company on the River Rhine and married one of his associates. Returning after the war under an assumed name, Ledru gets work on the barge La vierge du Rhin. He uncovers the conspiracy against him by his former wife and her lover who are now using the company for smuggling operations. He is assisted by Maria, the daughter of the vessel's captain.

== Cast ==
- Jean Gabin as Jacques Ledru/Martin Schmidt
- Nadia Gray as Maria Meister
- Elina Labourdette as Geneviève Labbé
- Andrée Clément as Anna Berg
- Olivier Hussenot as Meister
- Albert Dinan as Le commissaire Guérin
- Claude Vernier as Pietr
- Renaud Mary as Maurice Labbé
- Virginie Vitry as Secretary
- Germain Muller as Un complice de Pietr

== Bibliography ==
- Harriss, Joseph. Jean Gabin: The Actor Who Was France. McFarland, 2018.
- Walker-Morrison, Deborah. Classic French Noir: Gender and the Cinema of Fatal Desire. Bloomsbury Publishing, 2020.
