= Eight Men in a Castle =

1942 film

- Directed by: Richard Pottier
- Written by: Jean Aurenche; Jean-Paul Le Chanois
- Based on: Eight Men in a Castle by Jean Kéry
- Produced by: Lucien Masson
- Starring: René Dary; Jacqueline Gauthier; Aline Carola
- Cinematography: Georges Million
- Edited by: Germaine Fouquet
- Music by: Arthur Honegger; Arthur Hoérée
- Production company: La Société des Films Sirius
- Distributed by: La Société des Films Sirius
- Release date: 9 December 1942
- Running time: 93 minutes
- Country: France
- Language: French

Eight Men in a Castle (French: Huit hommes dans un château) is a 1942 French mystery crime directed by Richard Pottier and starring René Dary, Jacqueline Gauthier and Aline Carola. It was shot at the Photosonor Studios in Courbevoie in Paris. The film's sets were designed by the art director Marcel Mary. It was based on the 1934 novel of the same title by Jean Kéry.

== Synopsis ==
Following the sinking of a ship, the various survivors meet up again in a castle in the provinces. A series of murders take place around a mystery solving an inheritance that draws in amongst others a husband and wife team of detective novelists and a young actor.

== Cast ==
- René Dary as Monsieur Paladine
- Jacqueline Gauthier as Madame Paladine
- Aline Carola as Hélène de Chanceau
- Louis Salou as Delaunay
- Colette Régis as La comtesse de Chanceau
- André Carnège as Le juge d'instruction
- Pierre Palau as Le notaire
- Jean Meyer as Le neveu du notaire
- Maurice Pierrat as Le maître d'hôtel
- Jean Daurand as L'acrobate
- Charles Lemontier as Le cuisinier
- Jean Morel as Le commandant Dupuis
- Gabrielle Fontan as L'aubergiste
- Eugène Frouhins as Le jardinier
- Georges Vasty as L'inspecteur
- Robert Arpin as Le mousse
- Georges Grey as Alain Severac

== Bibliography ==
- Goble, Alan. The Complete Index to Literary Sources in Film. Walter de Gruyter, 1999.
- Leahy, Sarah & Vanderschelden, Isabelle. Screenwriters in French cinema. Manchester University Press, 2021.
- Rège, Philippe. Encyclopedia of French Film Directors, Volume 1. Scarecrow Press, 2009.
- Siclier, Jacques. La France de Pétain et son cinéma. H. Veyrier, 1981.
