= The Price of Love (1955 film) =

1955 film

- Directed by: Maurice de Canonge
- Written by: Simone Sauvag] André Héléna; Albert Simonin; Jean Rossignol; André Tabet
- Produced by: Edmond Ténoudji
- Starring: Claude Laydu; Joëlle Bernard; Pierre Destailles; Renaud Mary
- Cinematography: André Germain
- Edited by: Maurice Serein
- Music by: Louiguy
- Color process: Black and white
- Production company: Les Films Marceau
- Distributed by: Les Films Marceau
- Release date: 4 January 1955
- Running time: 86 minutes
- Country: France
- Language: French

The Price of Love (French: Interdit de séjour) is a 1955 French crime film directed by Maurice de Canonge and starring Claude Laydu, Joëlle Bernard, Pierre Destailles and Renaud Mary. The film's sets were designed by the art director Maurice Colasson.

== Plot ==
An outcast everywhere, particularly in the normal world in which he used to live in, a naive young man tries to find some help in the underworld.

== Cast ==
- Claude Laydu as Pierre Ménard
- Joëlle Bernard as Suzy
- Pierre Destailles as Jojo
- Renaud Mary as Fernando
- Daniel Cauchy as Paulo
- Liliane Bert as Monique
- Henri Crémieux as Le juge d'instruction
- Robert Dalban as L'inspecteur Chennier
- Arlette Merry as Raymonde
- Michel Piccoli as Georges
- Clara Tambour as L'auditrice
- Jean Clerens as Himself
- Isabelle Eber as Himself
- René Havard as Himself
- Robert Le Béal as L'avocat de Pierre
- Jean Morel as Himself
- Marcel Raine as L'avocat général
- Paul Frankeur as Commissaire Bernard

== See also ==
- List of French films of 1955

== Bibliography ==
- Burnett, Colin. The Invention of Robert Bresson: The Auteur and His Market. Indiana University Press, 2016.
