= The Bamboo Stroke =

1963 film

- Directed by: Jean Boyer
- Written by: Jean Guitton
- Produced by: Jean Boyer; Robert Dorfmann
- Starring: François Périer; Micheline Presle; Jean Richard
- Cinematography: Christian Matras
- Edited by: Jacqueline Brachet
- Music by: Georges Van Parys
- Production companies: Silver Films; Films Jean Boyer; Les Films Corona
- Distributed by: Valoria Films
- Release date: 12 April 1963
- Running time: 90 minutes
- Country: France
- Language: French

The Bamboo Stroke (French: Le coup de bambou) is a 1963 French comedy film directed by Jean Boyer and starring François Périer, Micheline Presle and Jean Richard. The title is a French expression for something that is painfully expensive. It was shot at the Billancourt Studios in Paris. The film's sets were designed by the art director Robert Giordani.

== Synopsis ==
Following the sale of her bistro, a young woman leaves the money from the transaction in a taxi. In order to avoid her husband's reproaches, she feigns amnesia.

== Cast ==
- François Périer as Léon Brissac
- Micheline Presle as Angèle Brissac
- Jean Richard as Albert
- Noël Roquevert as Dr. Séverin
- Jacques Dufilho as Le chauffeur de taxi
- Jean Lefebvre as L'auvergnat
- Paul Bisciglia
- Jacques Dynam
- Claudie Laurence
- Sophie Mallet
- Lucienne Marchand
- Dominique Zardi
- Léon Zitrone

== Bibliography ==
- Quinlan, David. Quinlan's Illustrated Directory of Film Stars. Batsford, 1996.
