= Counsel for Romance =

1936 film

- Theatrical poster
- Directed by: Jean Boyer; Raoul Ploquin
- Written by: Jean Boyer
- Produced by: Raoul Ploquin
- Starring: Danielle Darrieux; Henri Garat; Jean Dax
- Cinematography: Ewald Daub
- Edited by: Klaus Stapenhorst
- Music by: Georges Van Parys
- Production companies: L'Alliance Cinématographique Européenne (ACE); UFA
- Distributed by: ACE
- Release date: 18 December 1936 (France)
- Running time: 90 minutes
- Country: France
- Language: French

Counsel for Romance (French: Un mauvais garçon) is a 1936 French romantic comedy film directed by Jean Boyer and Raoul Ploquin and starring Danielle Darrieux, Henri Garat and Jean Dax.

== Production ==
The film was made as a co-production between the German studio UFA and its French subsidiary ACE. It was made at UFA's Babelsberg Studios in Berlin, with location shooting taking place in Paris. The film's sets were designed by the art directors Artur Günther and Max Knaake. The music is by Georges Van Parys.

== Plot ==
A young female lawyer refuses to get married as she thinks only of her work. But soon her father sends a crook so that she dedicates herself. Gradually, she begins to love the charming swindler.

== Cast ==
- Danielle Darrieux as Jacqueline Serval
- Henri Garat as Pierre Meynard
- André Alerme as Monsieur Serval
- Marguerite Templey as Mme. Serval
- Madeleine Suffel as Marie
- Jean Dax as Feutrier père
- Alfred Pasquali as P'tit Louis
- Léon Arvel as Le juge d'instruction
- Lucien Callamand as Le voisin de palier
- Robert Casa as Le bâtonnier / President of the Bar
- Jean Hébey as Fil-de-fer / Slim
- Roger Legris as Le vicomte
- Edouard Hamel as Le secrétaire du bâtonnier
- Bill Bocket as Le client violent au musette
- Emile Prud'homme as L'accordéoniste / Accordionist
