= Sergeant X (1960 film) =

1960 film

- Directed by: Bernard Borderie
- Written by: Ivan Loukach
- Produced by: Ignace Morgenstern
- Starring: Noëlle Adam; Christian Marquand; Paul Guers
- Cinematography: Claude Renoir
- Edited by: Christian Gaudin
- Music by: Georges Auric
- Production company: Les Films Marceaue
- Distributed by: Cocinor
- Release date: 19 February 1960
- Running time: 90 minutes
- Country: France
- Language: French

Sergeant X (French: Sergent X) is a 1960 French drama film directed by Bernard Borderie and starring Noëlle Adam, Christian Marquand and Paul Guers. It is a remake of the 1932 film of the same title. It was made in the style of a traditional Foreign Legion film with little acknowledgement of the ongoing Algerian War.

The film's sets were designed by the art director René Moulaert.

== Synopsis ==
After becoming involved in a track accident in North Africa, a former paratrooper returns home to find his girlfriend believes him dead and has married another man. He enlists in the French Foreign Legion.

== Cast ==
- Noëlle Adam as Françoise Renaud
- Christian Marquand as Michel Rousseau
- Paul Guers as Henri Mangin
- Guy Mairesse as Serge
- Renaud Mary as Capt. Robert
- Lutz Gabor as Willy
- Daniel Cauchy as Fred
- Yves Barsacq as Le médecin

== Bibliography ==
- Bedjaoui, Ahmed. Cinema and the Algerian War of Independence: Culture, Politics, and Society. Springer Nature, 2020.
