= Jean Hébey =

French Algerian actor

- Born: 29 August 1916; Algiers, French Algeria
- Died: 31 October 1992 (aged 76); Paris, France
- Occupation: Actor
- Years active: 1935–1972 (film)

Jean Hébey (1916–1992) was a French Algerian film actor.

== Selected filmography ==
- Le bébé de l'escadron (1935)
- Bichon (1936) - Jacques Fontanges
- Les grands (1936)
- Counsel for Romance (1936) - Fil-de-fer / Slim
- The Man from Nowhere (1937) - Pomino
- L'accroche-coeur (1938) - (uncredited)
- Remontons les Champs-Élysées (1938) - Louis XVI
- Deputy Eusèbe (1939) - Le maître d'hôtel
- L'entraîneuse (1939) - Un pensionnaire (uncredited)
- Beating Heart (1940) - Ponthus
- The Eleventh Hour Guest (1945) - Frédéric
- La femme fatale (1946) - Le directeur de l'hôtel
- The Queen's Necklace (1946) - Le roi Louis XVI
- The Marriage of Ramuntcho (1947) - L'hôtelier Dugoret
- Naughty Martine (1947) - Le marquis
- Quai des Orfèvres (1947) - L'excentrique (uncredited)
- One Night at the Tabarin (1947) - Le speaker
- Scandals of Clochemerle (1948) - Un commis
- Emile the African (1949) - Le clerc de notaire
- The Red Shoes (1948) - Parisian Taxi Driver at Opera Square (uncredited)
- Une femme par jour (1949) - Bob
- Manon (1949) - L'hôtelière
- The Chocolate Girl (1949)
- Brilliant Waltz (1949) - Le directeur
- Not Any Weekend for Our Love (1950) - Robert Renfort, directeur du journal
- Manèges (1950) - L'acheteur de chevaux
- We Will All Go to Paris (1950) - Le secrétaire
- Plus de vacances pour le Bon Dieu (1950)
- The Paris Waltz (1950) - Le dîneur
- My Friend Sainfoin (1950) - Le cabaretier
- Quay of Grenelle (1950) - Monsieur Chotard
- Just Me (1950) - Le patron du restaurant
- The Most Beautiful Girl in the World (1951) - Le directeur du journal France Presse
- Paris Nights (1951) - Le restaurateur
- The Cape of Hope (1951) - M. Flavey
- Chacun son tour (1951) - Barbochon
- Midnight Witness (1953) - Filmont - l'éditeur
- Les Compagnes de la nuit (1953) - L'avocat
- Les Intrigantes (1954) - Le Juge d'Instruction (uncredited)
- Flesh and the Woman (1954) - Le commissaire de police
- Crainquebille (1954) - Le bistrot
- Faites-moi confiance (1954) - Kapok
- April Fools' Day (1954) - M. Dutreille
- Oasis (1955) - Fremdenführer
- Papa, maman, ma femme et moi (1955) - Un passant (uncredited)
- Frou-Frou (1955) - L'homme qui veut enlever 'Frou frou
- La rue des bouches peintes (1955) - Le bijoutier
- Blackmail (1955) - Un inspecteur
- To Catch a Thief (1955) - Police Inspector Mercier (uncredited)
- The Little Rebels (1955) - La Cravate
- Marie Antoinette Queen of France (1956) - Marquis de Migennes
- Les carottes sont cuites (1956)
- Que les hommes sont bêtes (1957)
- An Eye for an Eye (1957) - L'automobiliste
- Incognito (1958) - Le directeur du cabaret
- Madame et son auto (1958)
- Suivez-moi jeune homme (1958) - Le bijoutier
- Mimi Pinson (1958)
- Asphalte (1959) - L'homme d'affaires
- Goodbye Again (1961) - Monsieur Cherel - Man in Club (uncredited)
- Alibi pour un meurtre (1961) - Docquois
- Five Miles to Midnight (1962) - Nikandros
- Le grand bidule (1967) - Le ministre
- Ces messieurs de la famille (1968) - Le directeur de Gabriel
- House of Cards (1968) - Man in charge of sleeping cars
- Sapho ou La fureur d'aimer (1971)
- Perched on a Tree (1971) - Le reporter TV
- Le droit d'aimer (1972)

== Bibliography ==
- Capua, Michelangelo. Anatole Litvak: The Life and Films. McFarland, 2015.
