= Guy Lefranc =

French film director and screenwriter

- Born: 21 October 1919; Paris, France
- Died: 1 February 1994 (aged 74); Saint-Germain-en-Laye, Yvelines, France
- Occupations: Director, screenwriter
- Years active: 1946–1989

Guy Lefranc (21 October 1919 - 1 February 1994) was a French director and screenwriter.

== Filmography ==
| Year | Title | Role | Box office | Notes |
|---|---|---|---|---|
| 1946 | A Friend Will Come Tonight | Assistant director | / | Directed by Raymond Bernard |
| 1946 | Goodbye Darling | Assistant director | / | Directed by Raymond Bernard |
| 1946 | Dropped from Heaven | Assistant director | / | Directed by Emil-Edwin Reinert |
| 1947 | Destiny Has Fun | First Assistant Director | / | Directed by Emil-Edwin Reinert |
| 1947 | La colère des dieux | Assistant director | / | Directed by Karel Lamač |
| 1947 | Monsieur Vincent | Assistant director | $52,914,675 | Directed by Maurice Cloche |
| 1948 | Le destin exécrable de Guillemette Babin | Assistant director | / | Directed by Guillaume Radot |
| 1949 | Pattes blanches | Assistant director | / | Directed by Jean Grémillon |
| 1950 | Tuesday's Guest | Assistant director | / | Directed by Jacques Deval |
| 1951 | Dr. Knock | Director | / | |
| 1951 | Young Love | Director | / | |
| 1951 | Without Leaving an Address | Assistant director | $15,167,782 | Directed by Jean-Paul Le Chanois |
| 1951 | Diary of a Country Priest | First Assistant Director | / | Directed by Robert Bresson |
| 1952 | The Man in My Life | Director | / | |
| 1952 | She and Me | Director | / | |
| 1953 | Capitaine Pantoufle | Director | / | |
| 1954 | Fly in the Ointment | Director | $13,480,312 | |
| 1955 | Blackmail | Director | / | |
| 1956 | La Bande à papa | Director | $21,849,420 | |
| 1956 | Fernand Cowboy | Director | / | |
| 1957 | Bonjour la chance | Director | / | |
| 1958 | Why Women Sin | Director & writer | / | |
| 1958 | Follow Me Young Man | Director & writer | / | |
| 1961 | Keep Talking, Baby | Director & writer | / | |
| 1962 | The Elusive Corporal | Assistant director & Writer | $16,940,677 | Directed by Jean Renoir |
| 1962 | Left-Hand Drive | Director | / | |
| 1962 | L'inspecteur Leclerc enquête | Director | / | TV series (1 episode) |
| 1964 | Let the Shooters Shoot | Director | / | |
| 1966 | The Malabars Are in the Perfume | Director & writer | $12,262,020 | |
| 1966 | Commissaire San Antonio | Director | $13,341,847 | |
| 1968 | Beru and These Women | Director & Editor | $11,192,437 | |
| 1968 | Salut Berthe! | Director | / | |
| 1969 | The Auvergnat and the Bus | Director | / | |
| 1970 | And Let It Jump! | Director & writer | / | |
| 1974 | L'implantation | Director | / | TV movie |
| 1975 | Le secret des dieux | Director | / | TV mini-series |
| 1975 | Marie-Antoinette | Director | / | TV mini-series |
| 1978 | La filière | Director | / | TV mini-series |
| 1979 | Désiré Lafarge | Director | / | TV series (1 episode) |
| 1980 | L'enterrement de Monsieur Bouvet | Director & writer | / | TV movie |
| 1980 | Commissaire Moulin | Director | / | TV series (1 episode) |
| 1980 | Julien Fontanes, magistrat | Director | / | TV series (2 episodes) |
| 1981 | Dickie-roi | Director & writer | / | TV series (6 episodes) |
| 1982 | Julien Fontanes, magistrat | Director | / | TV series (1 episode) |
| 1983 | Julien Fontanes, magistrat | Director | / | TV series (1 episode) |
| 1984 | Julien Fontanes, magistrat | Director | / | TV series (1 episode) |
| 1989 | Julien Fontanes, magistrat | Director | / | TV series (1 episode) |
