= Destiny Has Fun =

1946 film directed by Emil E. Reinert

- Directed by: Emil E. Reinert
- Written by: Jacques Companéez; Pierre Galante; André Tabet
- Starring: André Claveau; Dany Robin; Robert Murzeau
- Cinematography: Charles Bauer
- Edited by: Victoria Mercanton
- Music by: Wal Berg; Louiguy
- Production company: Les Films Ariane
- Distributed by: La Société des Films Sirius
- Release date: 13 December 1946
- Running time: 85 minutes
- Country: France
- Language: French

Destiny Has Fun (French: Le destin s'amuse) is a 1946 French comedy film directed by Emil E. Reinert and starring André Claveau, Dany Robin and Robert Murzeau. The film's sets were designed by the art director Guy de Gastyne.

== Cast ==
- André Claveau as Richard
- Dany Robin as Gabrielle
- Robert Murzeau as La Douceur
- Jean Carmet as La troisième complice
- Noël Roquevert as Tonton
- Jean-Roger Caussimon as Marcel
- André Numès Fils as Soulier
- Pierre Sergeol as Le juge d'instruction
- Robert Seller as Le père de Gabrielle
- André Urban as Loiselier
- René Fluet as Le fiancé
- Arthur Devère as Le gardien
- Jean Dunot as L'agent
- Jean Berton as Le percepteur
- Nicolas Amato as Un gendarme

== Bibliography ==
- Goble, Alan. The Complete Index to Literary Sources in Film. Walter de Gruyter, 1999.
