= The Last Penny =

1946 film

- Directed by: André Cayatte
- Written by: Louis Chavance; André Cayatte
- Produced by: Raymond Borderie
- Starring: Ginette Leclerc; Gilbert Gil; Fernand Charpin
- Cinematography: Charles Bauer
- Edited by: Marguerite Beaugé
- Music by: Jacques Dupont
- Production company: Continental Films
- Distributed by: Films Sonores Tobis
- Release date: 23 January 1946
- Running time: 90 minutes
- Country: France
- Language: French

The Last Penny (French: Le dernier sou) is a 1946 French drama film directed by André Cayatte and starring Ginette Leclerc, Gilbert Gil and Fernand Charpin. It was one of three films Leclerc appeared in for the collaborationist Continental Films, which she believed led to her arrest by the authorities following the Liberation. Although it was made during the Second World War the film was not released until March 1946.

== Synopsis ==
A secretary tries to save her friend's company from being bankrupted by unscrupulous figures.

== Cast ==
- Gilbert Gil as Pierre Durban
- Ginette Leclerc as Marcelle Levasseur
- Fernand Charpin as Colon
- Noël Roquevert as Stéfani
- Jacques Berlioz as Le président du tribunal
- Gabrielle Fontan as Mme. Durban
- Annie France as Jacqueline
- René Génin as Perrin
- Zélie Yzelle
- Guy Decomble

== Bibliography ==
- Mayne, Judith. Le Corbeau. University of Illinois Press, 2007.
