= The Straw Lover =

1951 film

- Directed by: Gilles Grangier
- Written by: Carlo Rim; Marc-Gilbert Sauvajon
- Produced by: Alexandre Mnouchkine; Evrard de Rouvre
- Starring: Jean-Pierre Aumont; Gaby Sylvia; Alfred Adam
- Cinematography: Michel Kelber
- Edited by: Jacqueline Sadoul
- Music by: Jean Marion
- Production company: Les Films Ariane
- Distributed by: La Société des Films Sirius
- Release date: 5 January 1951
- Running time: 86 minutes
- Country: France
- Language: French

The Straw Lover (French: L'Amant de paille) is a 1951 French comedy film directed by Gilles Grangier and starring Jean-Pierre Aumont, Gaby Sylvia and Alfred Adam. Louis de Funès plays a psychiatrist. The film based on Georges Feydeau's play "Le Dindon" (The Turkey).

The film's sets were designed by the art director Guy de Gastyne.

== Cast ==
- Jean-Pierre Aumont as Stanislas Michodier (Jimmy's friend)
- Gaby Sylvia as Gisèle Sarrazin de Fontenoy (Gaston's wife)
- Alfred Adam as Gaston Sarrazin de Fontenoy (Gisèle's husband)
- André Versini as Jimmy (Gisèle's lover)
- Louis de Funès as Bruno (the psychiatrist)
- Félix Oudart as Mr Kervadec
- Lucienne Granier as the lady in black
- Odette Barancey as the concierge
- Marcel Melrac as Mr Henri
- Emile Genevois as the photographer
- Gérard Buhr as one of Gaston's employées

== Bibliography ==
- Dayna Oscherwitz & MaryEllen Higgins. The A to Z of French Cinema. Scarecrow Press, 2009.
