= Young Love (film) =

1951 film

- Directed by: Guy Lefranc
- Written by: Michel Audiard
- Produced by: Jacques Bar; Jacques Roitfeld
- Starring: Louis Jouvet; Dany Robin; Daniel Gélin
- Cinematography: Louis Page
- Edited by: Monique Kirsanoff
- Music by: Paul Misraki
- Production company: Les Films Raoul Ploquin
- Distributed by: La Société des Films Sirius
- Release date: 14 November 1951
- Running time: 95 minutes
- Country: France
- Language: French

Young Love or A Love Story (French: Une histoire d'amour) is a 1951 French romantic drama film directed by Guy Lefranc and starring Louis Jouvet, Dany Robin and Daniel Gélin. It was shot at the Billancourt Studios in Paris and on location in the city and around Le Touquet. The film's sets were designed by the art director Robert Clavel.

== Synopsis ==
Inspector Plonche, investing the suicide of two young people Catherine and Jean, questions their parents. He establishes that the young couple were deeply in love but were prevented by her parents who considered him an unsuitable suitor. Rather than be kept apart they chose to commit suicide together.

== Cast ==
- Louis Jouvet as L'inspecteur Ernest Plonche
- Dany Robin as Catherine Mareuil
- Daniel Gélin as Jean Bompart
- Georges Chamarat as Auguste Bompart
- Yolande Laffon as Madame de Mareuil
- Renée Passeur asLéa
- Catherine Erard as Odile de Frontin
- Pierre Moncorbier as Le valet des Mareuil
- Paul Barge as Le commissaire Constant
- Marcel Herrand as Charles Mareuil

== Bibliography ==
- Bessy, Maurice & Chirat, Raymond. Histoire du cinéma français: 1951–1955. Pygmalion, 1989.
- Rège, Philippe. Encyclopedia of French Film Directors, Volume 1. Scarecrow Press, 2009.
