= The Billionaire Tramp =

1951 film

- Directed by: Léopold Gomez; Hervé Bromberger
- Written by: Léopold Gomez
- Produced by: Léopold Gomez
- Starring: Henri Guisol; Jacqueline Gauthier; Raymond Pellegrin
- Cinematography: Charles Bauer
- Edited by: Madeleine Bagiau
- Music by: Georges Derveaux
- Production company: Adria Films
- Distributed by: Astoria Films
- Release date: 18 May 1951
- Running time: 96 minutes
- Country: France
- Language: French

The Billionaire Tramp (French: Le clochard milliardaire) is a 1951 French comedy film directed by Léopold Gomez and Hervé Bromberger and starring Henri Guisol, Jacqueline Gauthier and Raymond Pellegrin. The film's sets were designed by the art director Claude Bouxin.

== Synopsis ==
An idle young man suddenly discovers that he has inherited a huge fortune from an eccentric uncle. However, the condition of the inheritance is that he spends some time living as a tramp. Initially accepting the condition simply to get his hands on the money, he soon finds it a rewarding experience in itself.

== Cast ==
- Henri Guisol as Olivier Cabrol
- Jacqueline Gauthier as La comtesse Olga Romano
- Raymond Pellegrin as Henri Laplanche
- Raymond Souplex as Sosthène
- Claire Olivier as Madame Laplanche
- René Génin as Le vieux clochard
- Lucas Gridoux as Perruchot
- Christiane Barry as Colette
- Liane Marlene as Suzanne
- Max Révol as Narcisse
- Jeanne Fusier-Gir as Marie
- Louis Bugette as Le bouquiniste
- André Chanu as Le couturier
- Marcel Delaître as Le commissaire de police
- Philippe Grey as Un ami d'Olivier
- Fabia Gringor as La chanteuse
- Philippe Hersent as Le commissaire de quartier
- Bernard Hubrenne as Un ami d'Olivier
- Robert Le Fort as Eusèbe
- Raymond Loyer as Maurice
- Doris Marnier as La jeune fille
- André Numès Fils as Le médecin
- Raymond Pélissier as Un inspecteur de police
- Philippe Richard as L'industriel

== Bibliography ==
- Krawc, Alfred. International Directory of Cinematographers, Set- and Costume Designers in Film: France (from the beginnings to 1980). Saur, 1983.
- Rège, Philippe. Encyclopedia of French Film Directors, Volume 1. Scarecrow Press, 2009.
