= Igor Wakhévitch =

French composer, born 1948

- Born: May 12, 1948 (age 77); Gassin, France
- Occupation: Composer
- Years active: 1970s-present
- Website: igorwakhevitch.com

Igor Wakhévitch (born 12 May 1948) is an avant-garde French composer. He released a series of studio albums in the 1970s and collaborated with Salvador Dalí in 1974.

Wakhevitch was born in Gassin, a small village on the French Riviera. His father is Russian-born French art director Georges Wakhévitch; his mother is the actress Marica Wakhévitch. Wakhevitch was a musical prodigy as a child, and studied piano under French composer Olivier Messiaen at the Conservatoire de Paris and classical pianist Marguerite Long.

His compositions are heavily influenced by avant-garde music including Igor Stravinsky and psychedelic rock bands such as Soft Machine and Pink Floyd. He was one of the first composers to use electronic keyboards.

In 1974, he composed the music for Salvador Dali's opera-poem Etre Dieu (To Be God), which included a libretto by Spanish writer Manuel Vazquez Montalban.

== Influence ==
Wakhévitch is one of the musicians named on the Nurse with Wound list of outsider and avant-garde music, which has come to be an important touchstone for those interested in the genre. His composition "Materia-Prima" is included on the compilation album Strain Crack & Break: Music from the Nurse With Wound List.

== Selected discography ==
- Logos (1970, Warner Bros.)
- Dr. Faust (1971, Parlophone)
- Hathor (1973, Parlophone)
- Nagual (1977, Warner Bros.)
- Kshatrya: The Eye of the Bird (2019, Transversales Disques)
