= Charles Bauer =

French cinematographer (1904–1975)

- Born: 26 February 1904; Paris, France
- Died: 22 June 1975 (aged 71); Bry-sur-Marne, Val-de-Marne, France
- Occupation: Cinematographer
- Years active: 1933 - 1953 (film)

Charles Bauer (26 February 1904 – 22 June 1975) was a French cinematographer.

== Selected filmography ==
- Ciboulette (1933)
- Dédé (1935)
- Ferdinand the Roisterer (1935)
- Charley's Aunt (1936)
- The Lie of Nina Petrovna (1937)
- Ignace (1937)
- Marthe Richard (1937)
- The Postmaster's Daughter (1938)
- Barnabé (1938)
- Pierre and Jean (1943)
- Picpus (1943)
- Night Warning (1946)
- The Last Penny (1946)
- Song of the Clouds (1946)
- Destiny Has Fun (1947)
- Naughty Martine (1947)
- One Night at the Tabarin (1947)
- Counter Investigation (1947)
- Night Express (1948)
- The Tragic Dolmen (1948)
- The Dancer of Marrakesh (1949)
- Shot at Dawn (1950)
- Wedding Night (1950)
- Moumou (1951)
- The Billionaire Tramp (1951)
- The Darling of His Concierge (1951)
- Sins of Madeleine (1951)
- The Nude Dancer (1952)
- The Red Head (1952)
- Sins of Paris (1953)

== Bibliography ==
- Phillips, Alastair. City of Darkness, City of Light: Émigré Filmmakers in Paris, 1929-1939. Amsterdam University Press, 2004.
