= Christian Gaudin (film editor) =

French film editor

- Born: France
- Occupation: Film editor
- Years active: 1938–1975 (film)

Christian Gaudin was a French film editor. He worked on more than sixty productions during his career.

== Selected filmography ==
- The Lafarge Case (1938)
- The Postmaster's Daughter (1938)
- The Train for Venice (1938)
- Whirlwind of Paris (1939)
- The Suitors Club (1941)
- The Murderer Lives at Number 21 (1942)
- Adrien (1943)
- Majestic Hotel Cellars (1945)
- Song of the Clouds (1946)
- After Love (1948)
- Dilemma of Two Angels (1948)
- The Lovers Of Verona (1949)
- Branquignol (1949)
- The Patron (1950)
- Justice Is Done (1950)
- Rendezvous in Grenada (1951)
- Imperial Violets (1952)
- The Baker of Valorgue (1953)
- Spring, Autumn and Love (1955)
- The Terror with Women (1956)
- Fernandel the Dressmaker (1956)
- Mademoiselle and Her Gang (1957)
- Sergeant X (1960)
- Ravishing (1960)
- Women Are Like That (1960)
- Constance aux enfers (1963)
- Your Turn, Darling (1963)
- Hardi Pardaillan! (1964)
- Marvelous Angelique (1965)
- The Sleeping Car Murders (1965)
- Angelique and the King (1966)
- Untamable Angelique (1967)
- Angelique and the Sultan (1968)
- The Private Lesson (1968)

== Bibliography ==
- Waldman, Harry. Maurice Tourneur: The Life and Films. McFarland, 2001.
