= The Red Rose (1951 film) =

1951 film directed by Marcello Pagliero

- Directed by: Marcello Pagliero
- Written by: Robert Scipion
- Produced by: Edmond Ténoudji
- Starring: Françoise Arnoul; Yves Deniaud; Dora Doll
- Cinematography: André Bac
- Edited by: Nicole Marko
- Music by: Georges Van Parys
- Production company: Les Films Marceau
- Distributed by: Les Films Marceau
- Release date: 7 February 1951
- Running time: 95 minutes
- Country: France
- Language: French

The Red Rose (French: La Rose rouge) is a 1951 French comedy film directed by Marcello Pagliero and starring Françoise Arnoul, Yves Deniaud and Dora Doll. The film's sets were designed by the art director Maurice Colasson. It features a series of musical sketches, and attracted roughly half a million spectators at the French box office.

== Cast ==
- Louis de Funès: Manito (the poet who eats glass)
- Les Frères Jacques (André Bellec, Georges Bellec, François Soubeyran, Paul Tourenne) as themselves
- Yves Robert: Yves Gérard, the leader of a group supposed to replace the Frères Jacques
- Françoise Arnoul: Martine (member of Yves' team)
- Jacques Hilling: Mr Guillet (member of Yves' team)
- Edmond Tamiz: Mr Garone (member of Yves' team)
- Guy Pierrault: member of Yves' team
- Jean Bellanger: member of Yves' team
- Yves Deniaud: Albert, director
- Dora Doll: Evelyne Dorsey, the movie star
- Maurice Teynac: Jean Maréchal, the film-maker
- Barbara Laage: Claire Claris, photographer
- Philippe Olive: Mr Matignon, Evelyne's producer
- Jean-Roger Caussimon: the barkeeper
- Geneviève Morel: cloakroom attendant
- Maurice Regamey: the tourist guide
- Nico: the director of the « La Rose Rouge »
- Maurice Dorléac: the cashier
- Grégoire Gromoff: the tourist who takes photographs
- Marcello Pagliero as himself
- Robert Scipion as himself

== Bibliography ==
- Phillips, Alastair & Vincendeau, Ginette. Paris in the Cinema: Beyond the Flâneur. Bloomsbury Publishing, 2019.
- Powrie, Phil & Cadalanu, Marie. The French Film Musical. Bloomsbury Publishing, 2020. ISBN 978-1-5013-2978-4.
