= Irène de Trebert =

French singer, dancer and actress

- Born: 6 February 1921; At sea, on the cruise liner 'Pierre-le-Grand'
- Died: 13 May 1996 (aged 75); Saint-Jean-de-Luz, Pyrénées-Atlantiques
- Occupation(s): Singer, actress

Irène de Trebert (1921–1996) was a French singer, dancer and actress. A singer of Swing music, she enjoyed great popularity during the years of the German occupation of France despite Nazi disapproval of her style of music. In 1942 she starred in the film Mademoiselle Swing, performing many of her songs.

== Selected filmography ==
- Mademoiselle Swing (1942)
- Duel in Dakar (1951)
- Monsieur Octave (1951)

== Bibliography ==
- Larry Portis. French Frenzies: A Social History of Pop Music in France. 2004.
