= The Sleepwalker (1951 film) =

1951 film

- Directed by: Maurice Labro
- Written by: Gérard Carlier; Jean Manse
- Produced by: Lucien Masson; Roger Ribadeau-Dumas
- Starring: Fernandel; Andrex; Gaby André
- Cinematography: Pierre Levent
- Edited by: Germaine Fouquet
- Music by: Louiguy
- Production company: La Société des Films Sirius
- Distributed by: La Société des Films Sirius
- Release date: 5 April 1951
- Running time: 89 minutes
- Country: France
- Language: French

The Sleepwalker (French: Boniface somnambule) is a 1951 French comedy film directed by Maurice Labro and starring Fernandel, Andrex and Gaby André. The film was shot at the Cité Elgé studios in Paris with sets designed by the art director Paul-Louis Boutié. It is a sequel to the 1949 film The Heroic Monsieur Boniface.

== Cast ==
- Fernandel as Victor Boniface
- Andrex as Charlie, le chef des gangsters
- Gaby André as Stella Gazzini, la vedette à Tabarin
- André Roanne as Louis, le voleur du briquet
- Raoul Marco as Le directeur des magasins
- Louis de Funès as Anatole, le mari soupçonneux
- Julien Maffre as Victor, le lampiste
- André Numès Fils as Jules, le valet de chambre du Grand Hôtel
- Rivers Cadet as Jean
- Michel Ardan as Un gangster
- Mathilde Casadesus as Mademoiselle Thomas
- Yves Deniaud as René, un gangster
- Simone Silva as Louise
- Nadine Tallier as Ginette, une vendeuse aux magasins Berthès

== Bibliography ==
- Ginette Vincendeau. Stars and Stardom in French Cinema. Bloomsbury Publishing, 2000.
