= Monte Carlo Baby =

- Theatrical release poster
- Directed by: Jean Boyer; Lester Fuller
- Written by: Jean Boyer; Lester Fuller; Alex Joffé
- Produced by: Ray Ventura
- Starring: Audrey Hepburn; Jules Munshin; Cara Williams
- Cinematography: Charles Suin
- Edited by: Fanchette Mazin
- Music by: Paul Misraki
- Distributed by: Hoche Productions
- Release dates: 14 December 1951 (Belgium); 1952 (United Kingdom)
- Running time: 70 minutes
- Countries: United Kingdom; France
- Languages: English; French

Monte Carlo Baby is a 1951 comedy film co-directed by Jean Boyer and Lester Fuller. It featured an early performance by Audrey Hepburn playing a spoiled actress. Most Hepburn biographies indicate that it was during the filming of this film that Hepburn was first discovered by the playwright Colette and chosen for the lead role in the play Gigi, which would lead to Hepburn launching her acting career in Hollywood (though see Secret People (film) for an alternative account that suggests she was discovered by a film producer via that movie). In any event, this was the last movie Hepburn made before launching her Hollywood film career.

Monte Carlo Baby was produced in the English language, while a second version of the film was made in French. Since Hepburn was fluent in French, she played the same role (although the character's name was changed). This version of the film was released in 1951 as Nous irons à Monte Carlo (We're Going to Monte Carlo).

== Cast ==
- Audrey Hepburn as Linda Farrel
- Jules Munshin as Antoine
- Cara Williams as Marinette
- Michele Farmer as Jacqueline
- Philippe Lemaire as Philippe Versaint
- Russell Collins as Max
- John Van Dreelen as Rudy Walter
- Georges Lannes as Detective
- Dalio as Melissa Farrell's agent
- André Luguet as Chattenay-Maillaard
- Ray Ventura as Ray Ventura – orchestra leader
- Jackie Sardou as Madame Bindinelli
- J. Orrigo : Johnny Walter - le bébé de Melissa et de Rudy
