= Charles-Félix Tavano =

French film director and screenwriter

- Born: Nice (Alpes-Maritimes)
- Died: 29 May 1963 (aged 76); Châtel-de-Neuvre (Allier)

Charles-Félix Tavano (19 April 1887 – 29 May 1963) was a French film director as well as a screenwriter.

== Filmography ==
=== Director ===
- 1931: Deux fois vingt ans
- 1932: Arrêtez-moi!
- 1932: Un client de province
- 1932: Billeting Order
- 1934: Les Deux Papas
- 1935: Un colpo di vento (Italian version of the French film Coup de vent by Jean Dréville)
- 1935: Zizi – short film –
- 1935: His Excellency Antonin
- 1948: Impeccable Henri
- 1949: Les Vagabonds du rêve
- 1949: Eve and the Serpent
- 1951: Coq en pâte

=== Unit production manager ===
- 1935: The Coquelet Affair
- 1939: Sacred Woods
- 1943: Mistral
- 1943: L'Homme de Londres
- 1945: A Cage of Nightingales
- 1946: Once is Enough
- 1947: Antoine and Antoinette

=== Assistant-director ===
- 1931: Cœur de Paris by Jean Benoît-Lévy and Marie Epstein

== Publications ==
- Charles-Félix Tavano and Marcel Yonnet, Quelques histoires de cinéma, Jules Tallandier Éditeur, Paris, 1923.
- Terres rouges – roman de la terre corse, Jules Tallandier Éditeur, Paris, 1927
- Quand l'amour nous mène, novel, Jules Tallandier Éditeur, Paris 1930.
- À l'ombre des buildings, novel, Jules Tallandier Éditeur, Paris 1931.
