= Serge Véber =

French screenwriter and film director (1897–1976)

- Born: 2 September 1897; Paris, France
- Died: 16 July 1976 (aged 78); Paris, France
- Occupations: Writer, director
- Years active: 1931-1968 (film)

Serge Véber (1897–1976) was a French screenwriter and film director. He also worked as a lyricist for operettas and was involved with many hit songs.

== Selected filmography ==
- A Son from America (1932)
- King of the Hotel (1932)
- Lilac (1932)
- Sailor's Song (1932)
- King of the Ritz (1933)
- The Old Devil (1933)
- A Day Will Come (1934)
- My Heart Is Calling You (1934)
- La Route impériale (1935)
- The Romantic Age (1949)
- Brilliant Waltz (1949)
- A Hundred Francs a Second (1953)
- Madelon (1955)
- Fernandel the Dressmaker (1956)
- Sénéchal the Magnificent (1957)
- Mademoiselle and Her Gang (1957)
- The Lord's Vineyard (1958)

== Bibliography ==
- Michelangelo Capua. Anatole Litvak: The Life and Films. McFarland, 2015.
