= The Most Beautiful Girl in the World (1951 film) =

1951 film

- Directed by: Christian Stengel
- Written by: Philippe Brunet; Jean Ferry; Christian Stengel; René Wheeler
- Produced by: Jean Le Duc; Alain Poiré; Christian Stengel
- Starring: Françoise Arnoul; Jacqueline Gauthier; Paul Bernard; Nadine Alari
- Cinematography: René Gaveau
- Edited by: Charles Bretoneiche
- Music by: Marc Lanjean
- Production company: Gaumont
- Distributed by: Gaumont Distribution
- Release date: 31 October 1951
- Running time: 110 minutes
- Country: France
- Language: French

The Most Beautiful Girl in the World (French: La plus belle fille du monde) is a 1951 French comedy film directed by Christian Stengel and starring Françoise Arnoul, Jacqueline Gauthier, Paul Bernard and Nadine Alari. It marked Arnoul's first starring role. The film's sets were designed by the art director Robert Hubert.

== Cast ==
- Françoise Arnoul as Françoise
- Jacqueline Gauthier as Jacqueline "Jackie" Tessier
- Paul Bernard as Martineau
- Nadine Alari as Marie Charmy
- Madeleine Barbulée as La secrétaire de l'agence
- Claude Borelli as Une concurrente
- María Riquelme as Christiane Thomas
- Marc Cassot as Robert
- Jacques Castelot as Gabory - le président
- Henri Crémieux as Balbec de la Morlière
- Marius David as L'imprésario
- Hubert de Lapparent as Carnot
- Nicole Francis as Colette Dumont
- Nicole Frantz as Une concurrente
- Renée Grisier as Une mère
- Jean Hébey as Le directeur du journal France Presse
- Joëlle Janin as Une concurrente
- Maud Lamy as Une concurrente
- Paulette Langlais as Paulette
- Mag-Avril as Une mère
- Henri Marchand as Le maire de Royat
- Renaud Mary as Alberto
- Olivier Mathot as Le prince Sélim Bey
- Christiane Mayo as Une concurrente
- Robert Moor as Un membre du cercle
- Christiane Nussbaum as Une concurrente
- Nadine Olivier as Une concurrente
- Maurice Régamey as Georges
- Max Révol as Loiseau
- Louis Seigner as Monsieur Dumont
- Solange Sicard as Une mère
- Robert Vattier as Le procureur Paul Thomas

== Bibliography ==
- Bessy, Maurice & Chirat, Raymond. Histoire du cinéma français: encyclopédie des films, 1940–1950. Pygmalion, 1986
- Oscherwitz, Dayna & Higgins, MaryEllen . The A to Z of French Cinema. Scarecrow Press, 2009.
- Rège, Philippe. Encyclopedia of French Film Directors, Volume 1. Scarecrow Press, 2009.
