= Rendezvous in Grenada =

1951 film

- Directed by: Richard Pottier
- Written by: Gérard Carlier; André Tabet
- Produced by: Antoine de Rouvre; Lucien Masson; Roger Ribadeau-Dumas
- Starring: Luis Mariano; Nicole Maurey; Jean Tissier
- Cinematography: André Germain
- Edited by: Christian Gaudin
- Music by: Francis Lopez
- Production companies: Société Française de Cinématographie; La Société des Films Sirius
- Distributed by: La Société des Films Sirius
- Release date: 21 November 1951
- Running time: 76 minutes
- Country: France
- Language: French

Rendezvous in Grenada (French: Rendez-vous à Grenade) is a 1951 French musical film directed by Richard Pottier and starring Luis Mariano, Nicole Maurey and Jean Tissier. It was shot at the Photosonor Studios in Paris. The film's sets were designed by the art director Paul-Louis Boutié.

== Cast ==
- Luis Mariano as Marco Da Costa
- Nicole Maurey as Manina
- Jean Tissier as Maxime Saintal
- Marthe Mercadier as Annette
- Olivier Hussenot as Le chauffeur
- Christiane Barry as La pompiste
- Louis Bugette as Casimir
- Zélie Yzelle as La dame qui traverse
- Paul Villé as Le valet
- Les Bluebell Girls as Elles-mêmes - Ensemble
- Lucien Hector
- Frédérique Nadar
- Janine Marsay
- Brigitte Bargès
- Henri Cote
- Gaston Garchery
- Jean Villet

== Bibliography ==
- Quinlan, David. The Illustrated Directory of Film Stars. Hippocrene Books, 1981.
