= Félix Oudart =

French actor (1881–1956)

- Born: 8 June 1881; Lille, France
- Died: 10 August 1956 (aged 75); Suresnes, Hauts-de-Seine, France
- Occupation: Actor
- Years active: 1920-1954 (film)

Félix Charles Oudart (8 June 1881 – 10 August 1956) was a French stage and film actor.

== Selected filmography ==
- Crainquebille (1922)
- Abduct Me (1932)
- Toto (1933)
- Theodore and Company (1933)
- George and Georgette (1934)
- Mam'zelle Spahi (1934)
- I Have an Idea (1934)
- A Day Will Come (1934)
- Merchant of Love (1935)
- Motherhood (1935)
- Happy Arenas (1935)
- Honeymoon (1935)
- Ferdinand the Roisterer (1935)
- Excursion Train (1936)
- Seven Men, One Woman (1936)
- The Heart Disposes (1936)
- The Blue Mouse (1936)
- Miarka (1937)
- Lights of Paris (1938)
- I Was an Adventuress (1938)
- The Five Cents of Lavarede (1939)
- The Porter from Maxim's (1939)
- Serenade (1940)
- A Woman in the Night (1943)
- Death No Longer Awaits (1944)
- Dorothy Looks for Love (1945)
- Dropped from Heaven (1946)
- Clockface Café (1947)
- One Night at the Tabarin (1947)
- Impeccable Henri (1948)
- Clochemerle (1948)
- Emile the African (1949)
- At the Grand Balcony (1949)
- Eve and the Serpent (1949)
- They Are Twenty (1950)
- Wedding Night (1950)
- The Straw Lover (1951)
- Piédalu in Paris (1951)
- Atoll K (1951)
- Life Is a Game (1951)
- The Passage of Venus (1951)
- La demoiselle et son revenant (1952)
- Piédalu Works Miracles (1952)
- Naked in the Wind (1953)
- Au diable la vertu (1954)
- Three Days of Fun in Paris (1954)

== Bibliography ==
- Goble, Alan. The Complete Index to Literary Sources in Film. Walter de Gruyter, 1999.
