= Night Warning (1946 film) =

1946 film

- Directed by: Léon Mathot
- Written by: René Wheeler
- Produced by: Lucien Masson
- Starring: Hélène Perdrière; Roger Pigaut; Pierre Dudan
- Cinematography: Charles Bauer
- Edited by: Aleksandr Uralsky
- Music by: Jean Lenoir
- Production company: La Société des Films Sirius
- Distributed by: La Société des Films Sirius
- Release date: 25 September 1946
- Running time: 120 minutes
- Country: France
- Language: French

Night Warning (French title: Nuits d'alerte) is a 1946 French war drama film directed by Léon Mathot and starring Hélène Perdrière, Roger Pigaut and Pierre Dudan. The film's sets were designed by the art director Roland Quignon.

== Synopsis ==
A waitress helps an escaped French resistance fighter to evade capture and make it to Britain.

== Cast ==
- Hélène Perdrière as Hélène
- Roger Pigaut as Pierre
- Pierre Dudan as Klaus
- Philippe Hersent as Stefan Hess
- Régine Montlaur as Lily
- Marcelle Monthil
- Henry Murray
- Pierre Collet
- Howard Vernon as L'aviateur anglais
- Abel Tarride as L'aubergiste
- Alexandre Mihalesco
- Georges Jamin
- Marc Cassot
- Charles Lemontier as Le cheminot
- Jane Marken as Madame Morizot
- Marcel Delaître as Morizot
- Simone Cerdan as La fille

== Bibliography ==
- Rège, Philippe. Encyclopedia of French Film Directors, Volume 1. Scarecrow Press, 2009.
