= Jacqueline Gauthier =

French actress (1921–1982)

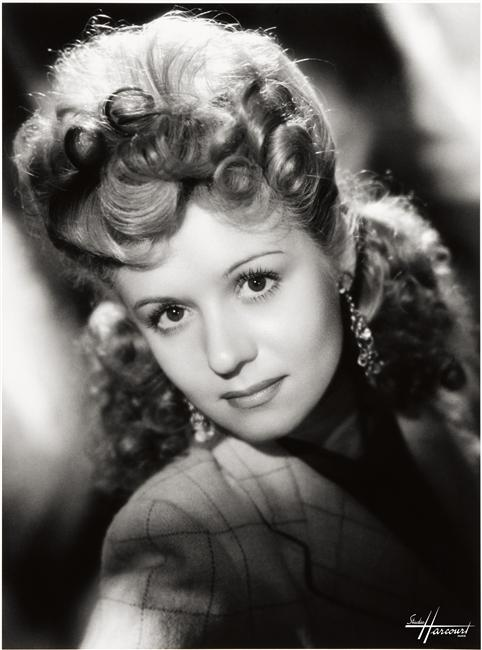
- Gauthier in 1943
- Born: 7 October 1921; Paris, France
- Died: 18 September 1982 (aged 63); Paris
- Occupation: Actress
- Years active: 1938–1982 (film)

Jacqueline Gauthier (7 October 1921 – 18 September 1982) was a French stage and film actress.

== Selected filmography ==
- Louise (1939)
- The Woman I Loved Most (1942)
- At Your Command, Madame (1942)
- The Newspaper Falls at Five O'Clock (1942)
- Eight Men in a Castle (1942)
- Frederica (1942)
- Shop Girls of Paris (1943)
- Death No Longer Awaits (1944)
- Dropped from Heaven (1946)
- Song of the Clouds (1946)
- The Murderer Is Not Guilty (1946)
- The Husbands of Leontine (1947)
- The Adventures of Casanova (1947)
- One Night at the Tabarin (1947)
- Forbidden to the Public (1949)
- Eve and the Serpent (1949)
- They Are Twenty (1950)
- Extravagant Theodora (1950)
- The Billionaire Tramp (1951)
- The Most Beautiful Girl in the World (1951)
- She and Me (1952)
- The Terror with Women (1956)

== Bibliography ==
- Goble, Alan. The Complete Index to Literary Sources in Film. Walter de Gruyter, 1999.
