= The Prettiest Sin in the World =

1951 film

- Directed by: Gilles Grangier
- Written by: Eddy Ghilain; Jean Jeannin; Marc-Gilbert Sauvajon
- Produced by: Roger De Venloo
- Starring: Georges Marchal; Dany Robin; Marthe Mercadier
- Cinematography: Marcel Grignon
- Edited by: Jacqueline Sadoul
- Music by: Paul Bonneau
- Production company: Majestic Films
- Distributed by: La Société des Films Sirius
- Release date: 29 August 1951
- Running time: 85 minutes
- Country: France
- Language: French

The Prettiest Sin in the World (French: Le plus joli péché du monde) is a 1951 French romantic comedy film directed by Gilles Grangier and starring Georges Marchal, Dany Robin and Marthe Mercadier. The film's sets were designed by the art director Emile Alex.

== Cast ==
- Georges Marchal as Jacques Lebreton
- Dany Robin as Zoé
- Marthe Mercadier as Liliane
- Bernard Lajarrige as Bébert / Albert Pignol
- Ginette Baudin as Christine de Villard-Beauperthuis
- Albert Duvaleix as M. Durozoir
- Rivers Cadet as Le maire
- Edmond Ardisson as Victor
- Harry-Max as Le patron
- Colette Régis as Mme Lebreton
- Noël Roquevert as Georges Lebreton
- Gabrielle Roanne as La mère de Christine
- Yves-Marie Maurin as Le petit Popaul
- Alexandre Rignault as Grasdu
- Robert Pizani as Clément Lebreton

== Bibliography ==
- Bessy, Maurice & Chirat, Raymond. Histoire du cinéma français: encyclopédie des films, 1940–1950. Pygmalion, 1986
- Rège, Philippe. Encyclopedia of French Film Directors, Volume 1. Scarecrow Press, 2009.
