= Georges Wakhévitch =

Russian-born French art director

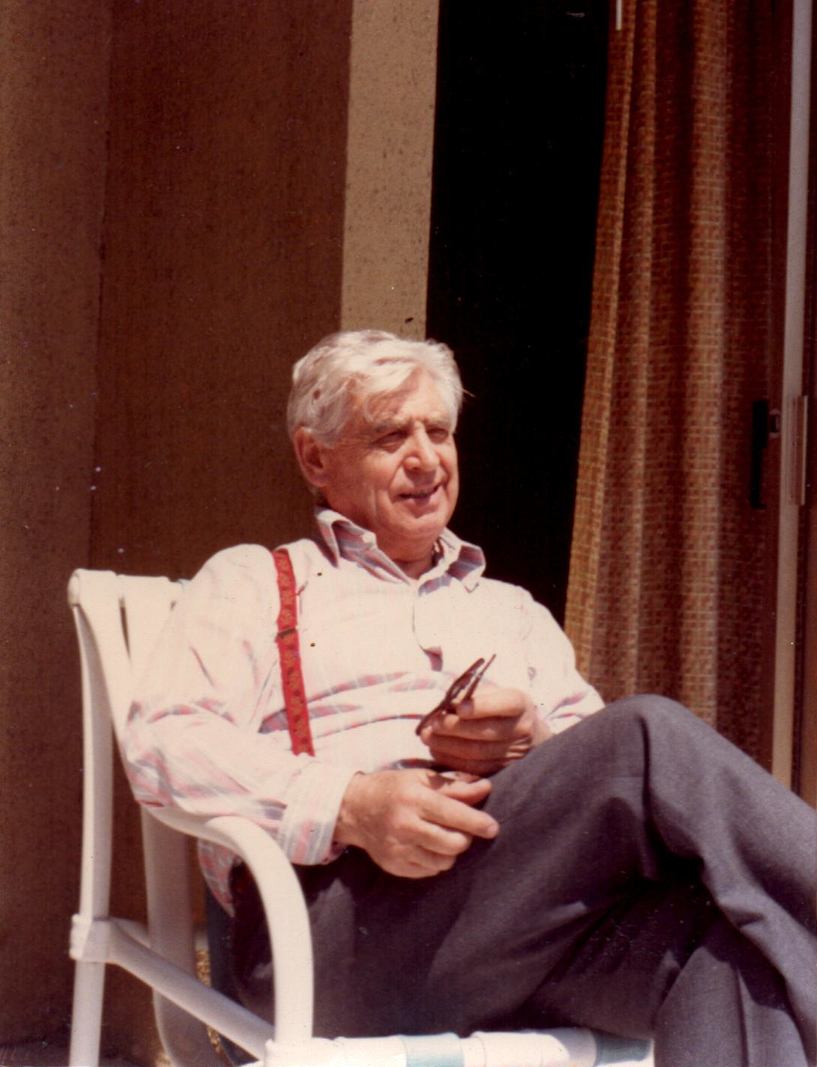
- Wakhévitch in 1979
- Born: 18 August 1907; Odessa, Russian Empire
- Died: 11 February 1984 (aged 76); Paris, France
- Occupation: Art director
- Years active: 1931–1983 (film)
- Children: Igor Wakhévitch

Georges Wakhévitch (Russian: Георгий Леонидович Вахевич; Georgy Leonidovich Vakhevich; August 18, 1907 in Odessa, Russian Empire – February 11, 1984 in Paris) was a Russian-born French art director.

The son of a naval engineer, he immigrated to France in 1921. He grew up in Paris, where he studied painting. He was an assistant to film director Lazare Meerson in the 1920s.

Wakhévitch also designed sets and costumes for the theatre, the ballet, and the opera. His designs usually used vivid colours and successful sets for Covent Garden included Boris Godunov, Otello, Die Meistersinger and London's first ever staging of Verdi's Macbeth in 1960. He also provided Paris in 1956 with new sets for Gounod's Faust, replacing some in use for over half a century.

He was the father of avant-garde composer Igor Wakhévitch.

== Selected filmography ==
- That Scoundrel Morin (1932)
- The Man with the Hispano (1933)
- Nitchevo (1936)
- Beautiful Star (1938)
- Conflict (1938)
- Gibraltar (1938)
- The Postmaster's Daughter (1938)
- Sirocco (1938)
- The Time of the Cherries (1938)
- The Suitors Club (1941)
- The Murderer is Afraid at Night (1942)
- Melody for You (1942)
- Behold Beatrice (1944)
- Death No Longer Awaits (1944)
- Mademoiselle X (1945)
- Box of Dreams (1945)
- The Eleventh Hour Guest 1945)
- Dawn Devils (1946)
- Song of the Clouds (1946)
- The Eternal Husband (1946)
- Mirror (1947)
- The Dance of Death (1948)
- The Eagle with Two Heads (1948)
- Ruy Blas (1948)
- Don Juan (1950)
- Miquette (1950)
- Dreaming Days (1951)
- Leathernose (1952)
- Pleasures of Paris (1952)
- Ali Baba and the Forty Thieves (1954)
- Don Juan (1956)
- Marie-Octobre (1959)
