= Marc Lanjean =

Jean Alciede Marie Marcland
- Born: 1903; Limoges
- Died: February 26, 1964 (aged 60–61)
- Occupation: Composer

Jean Alciede Marie Marcland (Limoges, 1903 - 26 February 1964) was a French composer of film music. He also wrote popular tunes under the name Marc Lanjean.

== Discography ==
- Musique Aux 4 Vents with Roger Roger

== Selected filmography ==
- Rue des Saussaies (1951)
- The Most Beautiful Girl in the World (1951)
- The Case Against X (1952)
- Eighteen Hour Stopover (1955)
- The Hotshot (1955)
