= Jean Boyer (director) =

French film director and songwriter (1901–1965)

Jean Boyer (26 June 1901 – 10 March 1965) was a French film director and songwriter. He was born in Paris.

== Selected songs ==
- 1930: "Un regardé", in Flagrant délit (Hanns Schwarz, 1930, music by F. Hollaender)
- 1931: "Les Gars de la marine", in Le Capitaine Craddock (music by W. R. Heyman)
- 1932: "Totor t'as tort" (music by René Mercier) - "Un homme" - "L'amour est un mystère" - "Maintenant, je sais ce que c'est" - "Quand ça m'prend" (music by Michel Levine)
- 1934: "C’est peu de chose" (music by R. Ervan)
- 1936: "Y'a toujours un passage à niveau" (music by Georges Van Parys)
- 1939: "Comme de bien entendu" - "Ça c'est passé un dimanche" - "Mimile" - "Ça fait d'excellents Français" (music by Georges Van Parys)
- 1945: "Pour me rendre à mon bureau" (words and music)
- 1950: "La Pagaïa" and "Je cherche un cœur" (music by Henri Betti)

== Filmography ==
=== Director ===
- Calais-Dover (1931)
- La Pouponnière (1932)
- Monsieur, Madame and Bibi (1932)
- L'Amour guide (1933)
- Antonia (1935)
- Roses noires (1935)
- Les Époux célibataires (1935)
- Counsel for Romance (1936)
- Prends la route (1936)
- My Priest Among the Rich (1938)
- Mother Love (1938)
- Ma sœur de lait (1939)
- Cocoanut (1939)
- Extenuating Circumstances (1939)
- Serenade (1940)
- Miquette (1940)
- The Acrobat (1941)
- Romance of Paris (1941)
- Chèque au porteur (1941)
- Bolero (1942)
- Prince Charming (1942)
- At Your Command, Madame (1942)
- Frederica (1942)
- The Lucky Star (1943)
- The Devil Goes to Boarding School (1944)
- La Femme fatale (1945)
- That's Not the Way to Die (1946)
- The Adventures of Casanova (1947)
- Mademoiselle Has Fun (1947)
- Une femme par jour (1948)
- Brilliant Waltz (1949)
- All Roads Lead to Rome (1949)
- The Prize (1950)
- We Will All Go to Paris (1950)
- Le Passe-muraille (1951)
- Monte Carlo Baby (1952)
- Crazy for Love (1952)
- An Artist with Ladies (1952)
- A Hundred Francs a Second (1953)
- Women of Paris (1953)
- Une vie de garçon (1953)
- The Country of the Campanelli (1954)
- I Had Seven Daughters (1955)
- Madelon (1955)
- Fernandel the Dressmaker (1956)
- The Terror with Women (1956)
- Sénéchal the Magnificent (1957)
- Mademoiselle and Her Gang (1957)
- Easiest Profession (1957)
- The Lord's Vineyard (1958)
- Nina (1959)
- The Indestructible (1959)
- Le Confident de ces dames (1959)
- Bouche cousue (1960)
- The Crumblers Are Doing Well (1961)
- Virginie (1962)
- It's Not My Business (1962)
- The Bamboo Stroke (1963)
- Relax Darling (1964)

=== Scriptwriter ===
- End of the World (1931)
- Princess, At Your Orders! (1931)
- Caught in the Act (1931)
- The Typist (1931)
- Kiss Me (1932)
- Passionately (1932)
- Honeymoon Trip (1933)
- Dédé (1935)
