= Films Sirius =

French film company

La Société des Films Sirius was a French film production and distribution company active from the 1930s to the 1970s. The company enjoyed its greatest success in the years after the Second World War. In 1959 it was one of the four leading production companies in the country alongside Filmsonor, Gaumont and Pathé. Amongst its productions was the final Laurel and Hardy film Atoll K.

== Selected filmography ==
- La Route impériale (1935)
- A Man to Kill (1937)
- Midnight Tradition (1939)
- The Emigrant (1940)
- Hangman's Noose (1940)
- Eight Men in a Castle (1942)
- The White Waltz (1943)
- Love Story (1943)
- The Wolf of the Malveneurs (1943)
- The Midnight Sun (1943)
- The Ménard Collection (1944)
- The Black Cavalier (1945)
- Night Warning (1946)
- The Sea Rose (1946)
- The Visitor (1946)
- Loves, Delights and Organs (1947)
- A Cop (1947)
- The Eagle with Two Heads (1948)
- Dilemma of Two Angels (1948)
- Convicted (1948)
- The Cupid Club (1949)
- The Farm of Seven Sins (1949)
- The Heroic Monsieur Boniface (1949)
- Casimir (1950)
- The Happy Man (1950)
- The New Masters (1950)
- The Unexpected Voyager (1950)
- Mademoiselle Josette, My Woman (1950)
- Julie de Carneilhan (1950)
- Old Boys of Saint-Loup (1950)
- Rendezvous in Grenada (1951)
- Dr. Knock (1951)
- The Straw Lover (1951)
- Life Is a Game (1951)
- Passion (1951)
- The Sleepwalker (1951)
- The Cape of Hope (1951)
- Young Love (1951)
- The Prettiest Sin in the World (1951)
- Love, Madame (1952)
- Heart of the Casbah (1952)
- A Girl on the Road (1952)
- Adorable Creatures (1952)
- Twelve Hours of Happiness (1952)
- She and Me (1952)
- Women Are Angels (1952)
- A Woman's Treasure (1953)
- Alarm in Morocco (1953)
- Dortoir des grandes (1953)
- Rhine Virgin (1953)
- The Last Robin Hood (1953)
- Follow That Man (1953)
- One Step to Eternity (1954)
- Orient Express (1954)
- Public Opinion (1954)
- The Count of Monte Cristo (1954)
- Nana (1955)
- Madonna of the Sleeping Cars (1955)
- Tides of Passion (1956)
- Love in Jamaica (1957)
- Folies-Bergère (1957)
- Charming Boys (1957)
- The Inspector Likes a Fight (1957)
- Nathalie, Secret Agent (1959)
- Head Against the Wall (1959)
- The Road to Shame (1959)
- Le Combat dans l'île (1962)
- Mathias Sandorf (1963)
- Cherchez l'idole (1964)
- La Voleuse (1966)
- Paris in August (1966)
- Asterix and Cleopatra (1968)

== Bibliography ==
- Aping, Norbert. The Final Film of Laurel and Hardy: A Study of the Chaotic Making and Marketing of Atoll K. McFarland, 2014.
- Crisp, C.G. The Classic French Cinema, 1930-1960. Indiana University Press, 1993
