= Roger Dumas (composer) =

French composer and conductor

- Born: Roger Auguste Dumas; Salindres (Gard)
- Died: 15 June 1951 (aged 53); Paris
- Occupations: Composer; Conductor
- Years active: 1924–1951

Roger Dumas (31 December 1897 – 15 June 1951) was a French composer and conductor.

== Biography ==
After he finished his musical studies, first at the Conservatory of Nice then the Conservatoire de Paris, Roger Dumas was conductor during the 1920s and 1930s at the Casino de Toulon (a city where he also taught at the conservatory). It is in this entertainment venue and under his musical direction that his first operetta, Flouette, was created in 1924. The second was Le Danseur du casino, premiered at Orange in 1935.

He became film score composer on two productions respectively released in 1930 (Cendrillon de Paris, with Alibert and Pauline Carton) and 1931 (Les Vagabonds magnifiques, with Nadia Sibirskaïa and Georges Melchior).

His third film was Les Bleus de la marine by Maurice Cammage (1934, music cowritten with Vincent Scotto), starring Fernandel and the screenwriter Jean Manse. In association with the latter (the actor's stepbrother) as librettist, he composed his third operetta, Ignace, created in Marseille in 1935, then revived at the Théâtre de la Porte-Saint-Martin in Paris in 1936, with Fernandel in the leading role, Andrex, Edmond Castel, Alice Tissot and Henry Trévoux. This operetta was brought to the screen under the same title, under the direction of Pierre Colombier (1937), where Fernandel, Andrex and Alice Tissot resume their respective roles.

There followed a collaboration with Fernandel for twelve other films (to which Jean Manse participated, mostly as lyricist), including Barnabé by Alexander Esway (1938), Simplet (directed by the actor, 1942) and L'Aventure de Cabassou by Gilles Grangier (1946). Their last feature film together was Uniformes et grandes manœuvres by René Le Hénaff, released in December 1950, some months before the composer's premature deaths at 53.

Dumas also contributed to eight films without Fernandel, including his first two already mentioned, Pierre et Jean by André Cayatte (1943, with Renée Saint-Cyr and Noël Roquevert) as well as Cécile est morte! by Maurice Tourneur (1944, with Albert Préjean featuring commissaire Maigret).

Roger Dumas' fourth operetta was Un de la musique, created at the Théâtre de la Porte-Saint-Martin in 1937, with Georges Milton, Louis Florencie and Alice Tissot. The fifth (in partnership with Georges Van Parys for music) was Les Chasseurs d'images, created at the Théâtre du Châtelet in Paris in 1946, with Fernandel and René Lestelly. The sixth and last one was La Chance d'Oscar (published in 1949), not represented but of which Fernandel recorded two songs on 78 rpm (published in 1951) - after others before, like Ignace and On m'appelle simplet, song-titles of the pre-mentioned movies - .

== Film scores (complete) ==
- 1930: Cendrillon de Paris by Jean Hémard
- 1931: Les Vagabonds magnifiques by Gennaro Dini
- 1934: Les Bleus de la marine by Maurice Cammage (*)
- 1937: Ignace by Pierre Colombier (*)
- 1937: The Kings of Sport by Pierre Colombier (*)
- 1938: Barnabé by Alexander Esway (*)
- 1939: Berlingot and Company by Fernand Rivers (*)
- 1942: Dédé la musique by André Berthomieu
- 1942: Simplet by Fernandel (*)
- 1943: Pierre and Jean by André Cayatte
- 1943: Don't Shout It from the Rooftops by Jacques Daniel-Norman (*)
- 1943: La Main du diable by Maurice Tourneur
- 1943: Adrien by Fernandel (*)
- 1943: La Ferme aux loups by Richard Pottier
- 1943: La Cavalcade des heures by Yvan Noé (*)
- 1943: Le Val d'enfer by Maurice Tourneur
- 1943: The Lucky Star by Jean Boyer (*)
- 1944: Cécile est morte! by Maurice Tourneur
- 1946: The Adventure of Cabassou by Gilles Grangier (*)
- 1946: Rooster Heart by Maurice Cloche (*)
- 1947: Irma la voyante by Antoine Toé (short film) (*)
- 1950: Uniformes et grandes manœuvres by René Le Hénaff (*)

(*) : Films with Fernandel

== Other compositions (selection) ==
- 1924: Flouette, operetta on a libretto by J. Marlines (Casino de Toulon)
- 1926: Ah, ne dites pas ça; Cagoli-Cagola; Chois l'Escavenier; En Provence; Je préfère l'écarté; Mais si l'occasion se présente; O parfums... Divins poèmes; On a toujours tort... On a...; Quand on a fait ça tout' la journée; Quand on se mêl' de rien; Y'a qu'ça: collection of popular songs for voice and piano
- 1927: Les mensonges; Mia Gorgonzolina; O... O... Ophélie; Par un soir gris; Les Remords de Colombine; Théo Théo; Un coup d'œil; La vadrouillarde; Vision d'Orient; Vive le printemps; Yette: collection of popular songs for voice and piano
- 1935: Le Danseur du casino, operetta (created at Orange)
- 1935: Ignace, operetta on a libretto by Jean Manse (created in Marseille)
- 1936: Ignace, operetta cited above (revival at the Théâtre de la Porte-Saint-Martin)
- 1937: Un de la musique, operetta on a libretto by Camille François (Théâtre de la Porte-Saint-Martin)
- 1946: Les Chasseurs d'images, operetta on a libretto by André Mouëzy-Éon and Jean Manse, music in collaboration with Georges Van Parys (création à Paris, Théâtre du Châtelet)
- 1949: La Chance d'Oscar, operetta
