= Callamand =

Callamand is a surname. Notable people with the surname include:

- Lucien Callamand (1888–1968), French film actor
- Sébastien Callamand (born 1985), French footballer
