= Charlotte and Her Boyfriend =

1958 film

- Title screen from the film
- Directed by: Jean-Luc Godard
- Written by: Jean-Luc Godard
- Produced by: Pierre Braunberger
- Starring: Jean-Paul Belmondo; Anne Collette
- Narrated by: Jean-Luc Godard
- Cinematography: Michel Latouche
- Edited by: Cécile Decugis (uncredited); Jean-Luc Godard (uncredited)
- Music by: Pierre Monsigny
- Distributed by: Unidex
- Release date: 31 December 1958
- Running time: 13 minutes
- Country: France
- Language: French

Charlotte and Her Boyfriend (French: Charlotte et son Jules, transl. Charlotte and Her Jules) is a 1958 short film by Franco-Swiss director Jean-Luc Godard. It is shot entirely in or from a hotel room, in which Jules (Jean-Paul Belmondo) gives his former girlfriend Charlotte (Anne Collette) a seemingly endless and self-indulgent tirade on her faults and his tribulations. The film's original length was 20 minutes, but it was cut down by a third by British censors.

Godard directed the film as his second in a series based around two Parisians named Charlotte and Véronique. After a dispute with collaborator Éric Rohmer, Godard wrote the script for Charlotte and Her Boyfriend and enlisted his girlfriend, Anne Collette, to reprise her role as Charlotte from All the Boys Are Called Patrick. Godard cast Jean-Paul Belmondo as Jules, his first collaboration with the actor. Filming was done entirely in Godard's hotel room. The film was left undubbed and unfinished until Godard received an offer from Jacques Becker to screen it alongside his next film, although Becker's death precluded this. Godard dubbed Belmondo's lines due to the latter's service in the Algerian War. Godard biographers and film scholars have noted the film's autobiographical elements and homage to Jean Cocteau's play Le bel indifferent.

== Plot ==
Charlotte exits a sports car in front of a Parisian apartment building and tells her boyfriend to wait for her. Upstairs, licking an ice cream cone, she enters the apartment of her former boyfriend Jules, who begins reproaching her in a long and comically insulting monologue for ending their relationship. Although Charlotte attempts to answer Jules' questions, he berates her for interrupting him as he angrily restates her betrayal of him. As Charlotte's attention wanders back to her boyfriend outside, Jules grows more desperate, and both threatens to hurt Charlotte and to buy her an Alfa Romeo with the profits from selling the rights to his novel to Hollywood. He claims she has returned because she cannot live without him, to which Charlotte responds that she has only come to get her toothbrush, and leaves.

== Cast ==
- Jean-Paul Belmondo as Jules (voiced by Jean-Luc Godard)
- Anne Collette as Charlotte
- Gérard Blain as Charlotte's new boyfriend (uncredited)

== Production and release ==
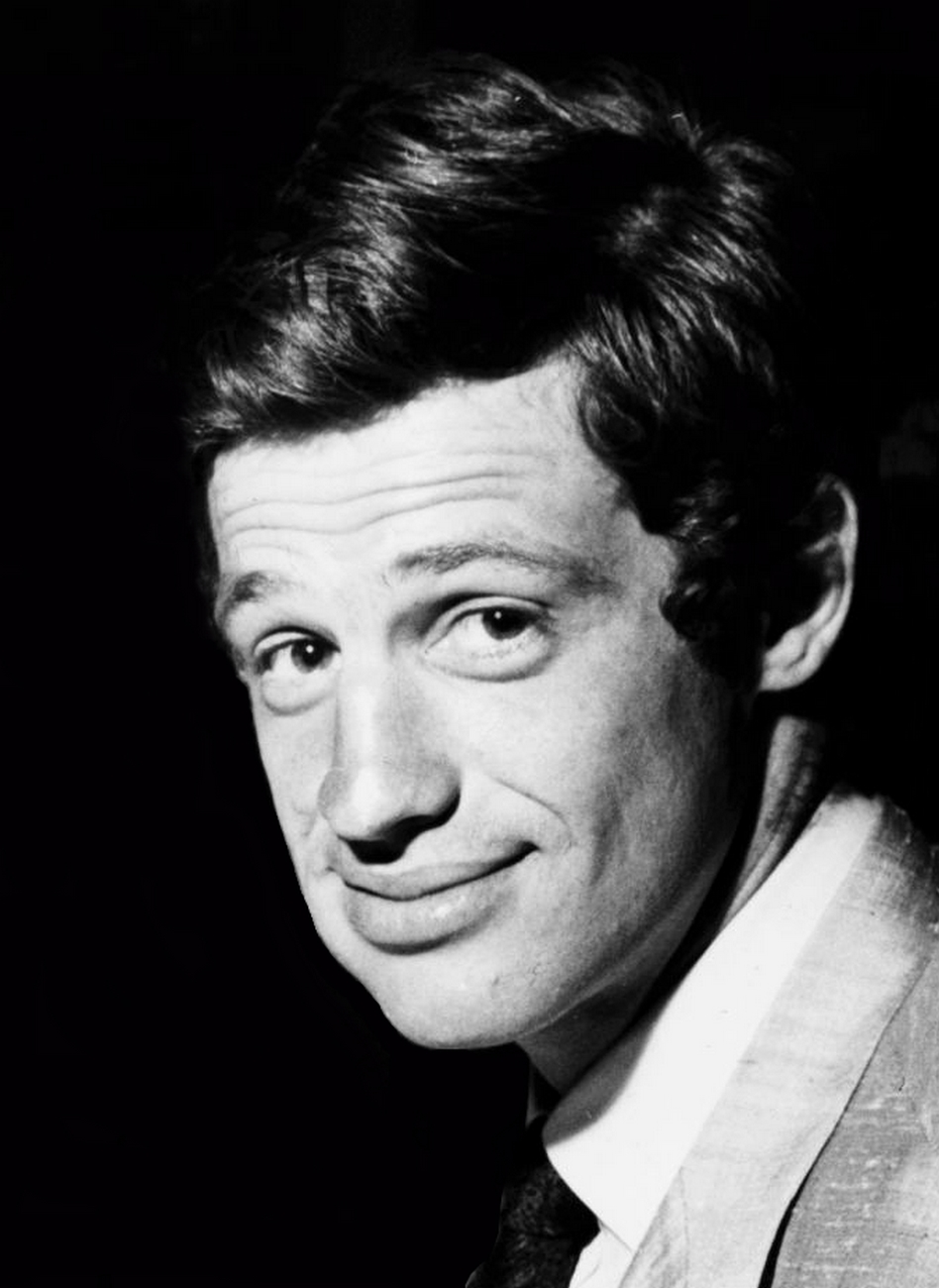
Charlotte et son Jules was Godard's first work with Jean-Paul Belmondo, to whom he was introduced by Anne Collette.

In 1957, Jean-Luc Godard, with the help of Éric Rohmer, began devising a series of short films centered on two young women named Charlotte and Véronique. Godard had previously directed a short documentary, Operation beton, and a short narrative film, Une femme coquette, both in 1955. However, most of his work was as a writer for Cahiers du Cinéma, a film journal through which young filmmakers of the budding French New Wave espoused their theory and critique of film. Although Godard had written a feature-length screenplay, Odile, the project came to nothing. Rohmer wrote the first film in the series, and in late 1957, it was produced as Tous les garçons s'appellent Patrick (All the Boys Are Called Patrick) by Pierre Braunberger, with Godard as director. The plot sees the principal characters, Charlotte and Véronique, realizing that they are both dating the same man, named Patrick. Rohmer did not agree with Godard's changes to the screenplay, and made the next film in the series, Véronique et son cancre (Véronique and Her Dunce) without Godard. Godard wrote his own script for next film in the series, which became Charlotte and Her Boyfriend.

Godard first cast his then girlfriend, Anne Collette, for Tous les garçons s'appellent Patrick, and she returned for his second film in the series. While on the set of Sois belle et tais-toi, Collette introduced Godard to fellow actor Jean-Paul Belmondo, at the time a theatre actor without much film experience. Godard met with Belmondo in the Brasserie Lipp and suggested that they work together, to which Belmondo agreed, believing Godard would never complete a film. The two later ran into each other, whereupon Godard offered Belmondo 50,000 francs to act in a film set in his apartment. Godard shot the film in his hotel on the Rue de Rennes. The filming location initially troubled Belmondo, who suspected the film to be a pretense for a proposition. Michel Latouche acted as Godard's director of photography.

After filming, the project was left aside for months, until a promise by director Jacques Becker to screen it alongside his next film influenced Braunberger to fund the film's dubbing. Belmondo was unable to dub his lines due to his service in Algeria, and allowed Godard to do it himself on the condition that he cast Belmondo in his first feature film. Charlotte et son Jules was never screened alongside Becker's next film, The Hole, as promised; not only was the film too long, by the time of its 1960 release Godard had completed his first feature, Breathless, and Becker had died. Although the original film was 20 minutes long, in the United Kingdom it was cut down by a third, where the uncut version was rated X.

== Retrospective analysis ==
Critics have noted the film's self-declared homage to Jean Cocteau's play Le bel indifferent. Godard biographer Richard Brody described the film as an "elaborate gag", comparing it to a cartoon with a speech bubble "filled to bursting" by Godard, with little regard for cinematography and narrative. Brody also characterized the film as "a self-deprecating self-portrait", with Jean's "madly romantic austerity" a reflection of Godard's own poverty and tendency of recklessly pursuing romances. However, Brody stated that Godard suppressed the film's personal elements in favor of the script's abundant allusions and references.

Tom Milne noted a reference to Max Ophüls' Le Plaisir, a favorite of Godard's, in Jean's claim that he would not listen to Charlotte's excuses, comparing them to Simone Simon's threat to jump out a window. The film was included on The Criterion Collection's release of Breathless as a bonus feature.

== Works cited ==
- Brody, Richard (2008). Everything Is Cinema: The Working Life of Jean-Luc Godard (1. ed.). New York: Metropolitan Books. ISBN 978-0-8050-6886-3.
- Roud, Richard (1968). Jean-Luc Godard. Cinema One; 1. London: Thames and Hudson. ISBN 978-0-500-48010-6.
- Curi, Giandomenico. "Re-Creating the Gaze: Peter Whitehead's Cinema and the Films of Others." Framework: The Journal of Cinema and Media, vol. 52, no. 1, 2011, pp. 404–17. JSTOR, http://www.jstor.org/stable/41553496. Accessed 30 Jan. 2025.
- Biltereyst, Daniel (2022), "Disciplining the Nouvelle Vague: Censoring A Bout de Souffle and Other Early French New Wave Films (1956-", Je T'Aime... Moi Non Plus: Franco-British Cinematic Relations, Berghahn Books, p. 110, retrieved 2025-01-30
