= Josette (1937 film) =

1937 film

- Directed by: Christian-Jaque
- Written by: Paul Fékété
- Produced by: Jules Calamy
- Starring: Fernandel; Mona Goya; Lucien Rozenberg
- Cinematography: Marcel Lucien
- Edited by: André Versein
- Music by: Vincent Scotto
- Production company: Productions Calamy
- Distributed by: Gray-Film
- Release date: 22 January 1937
- Running time: 90 minutes
- Country: France
- Language: French

Josette is a 1937 French comedy film directed by Christian-Jaque and starring Fernandel, Mona Goya and Lucien Rozenberg. The film's sets were designed by the art director Pierre Schild.

== Synopsis ==
Albert Durandal, a kindly figure with aspirations to be a music hall performer, effectively adopts a young girl Josette when her mother is taken ill and has to go to a sanatorium. He also assists an elderly man who collapses in the street, looking after him at his house without realising he is the millionaire Samuel Rothenmeyer. Rothenmeyer repays this help by financing Durandal's career on stage.

== Cast ==
- Fernandel as Albert Durandal aka Albertal
- Josette Contandin as Josette
- Mona Goya as La chanteuse Viviane Eros
- Lucien Rozenberg as Le baron Samuel Rothenmeyer
- Robert Arnoux as Rémy Doré
- Andrex as Lucien
- Robert Seller as Émile - le valet du baron
- Jacqueline Prévot as Jeanne - la maman de Josette
- Joe Alex as Bamboula - le domestique noir
- Nicolas Amato as Le chanteur des rues
- Anthony Gildès as Le professeur au concours de puériculture
- Marcel Laporte
- René Lestelly
- Sinoël

== Bibliography ==
- Oscherwitz, Dayna & Higgins, MaryEllen. The A to Z of French Cinema. Scarecrow Press, 2009.
