= The Five Cents of Lavarede (1939 film) =

- Directed by: Maurice Cammage
- Written by: Jean-Louis Bouquet; Henri Chabrillat; Jean Rioux; René Wheeler; Paul d'Ivoi (novel)
- Produced by: Maurice Cammage
- Starring: Fernandel; Josette Day; Andrex
- Cinematography: Georges Clerc
- Music by: Casimir Oberfeld
- Production company: Société de Production du Film Les Cinq Sous
- Distributed by: Gray-Film
- Release date: 8 March 1939
- Running time: 125 minutes
- Country: France
- Language: French

The Five Cents of Lavarede (French: Les cinq sous de Lavarède) is a 1939 French comedy adventure film directed by Maurice Cammage and starring Fernandel, Josette Day and Andrex. It is based on the eponymous 1894 novel by Paul d'Ivoi and Henri Chabrillat.

== Plot ==
In order to claim an inheritance, a young man must travel all the way around the world with only twenty five centimes in his pocket.

== Cast ==
- Fernandel as Armand Lavarède
- Josette Day as Miss Aurett Murlington
- Andrex as Jim Strong
- Félix Oudart as Le capitaine du cargo Heaven Way
- André Roanne as Jim Strong
- Henri Nassiet as Jack
- Pierre Labry as Le gardien chef
- Albert Duvaleix as Maître Panabert
- Geymond Vital as Le policier
- Jacques Henley as L'officier du Normandie
- Georges Cahuzac as Le commissaire de bord
- Talmont as Le révérend Houston
- Serjius as Un gardien
- Jacques Servières as Le pilote
- Marcel Vidal as Le barman
- Paul Grail as César Bouffigues, l'agent marseillais
- Paul Bonifas as Un marin
- Alexandre Mihalesco as Le commissaire-priseur hindou
- Philippe Janvier as Le conspirateur
- Georges Briquet as Le reporter
- Jacqueline Figus as La danseuse acrobatique
- Jeanne Fusier-Gir as La princesse Djali
- Mady Berry as Mme Benoît, la concierge
- Jean Témerson as Tartinovitch
- Jean Dax as Sir Murlington
- Marcel Vallée as Bouvreuil
- Georges Marceau as L'exécuteur
- Fernand Blot
- Chukry-Bey in a bit part
- Hugues de Bagratide as Le ministre hindou
- Ratna Moerindiah as Une danseuse hindoue
- Jean Morel (actor)
- Frédéric O'Brady
- Maurice Pierrat

== In popular culture ==
The same year the film premiered it was also adapted into a text comic by French artist Pellos.

== Bibliography ==
- Goble, Alan. The Complete Index to Literary Sources in Film. Walter de Gruyter, 1999.
