= Act of Passion =

Lettre à mon juge
- First edition cover
- Author: Georges Simenon
- Original title: Lettre à mon juge
- Translator: Louise Varèse (English)
- Language: French
- Genre: Psychological fiction
- Publisher: Presses de la Cité
- Publication date: 1947
- Publication place: Belgium
- English publication date: 1953 (as Act of Passion)
- Media type: Print (hardcover and paperback)
- Pages: 250 (English edition)
- ISBN: 978-3-257-24126-6
- Preceded by: Trois Chambres à Manhattan
- Followed by: Maigret à New York

Lettre à mon juge (Letter to My Judge) was written by Belgian author Georges Simenon in 1946 during his stay at Bradenton Beach, Florida and published in Paris the following year by Presses de la Cité. It is a dark psychological account of a man overcome by buried passions who becomes a murderer.

Unusually among Simenon's output, it is written in the first person.

The novel was first published in English in 1953 by Routledge & Kegan Paul, translated by Louise Varèse. The title is often translated into English as Act of Passion.

== Plot ==
The novel is a long letter written in prison by condemned murderer Dr. Charles Alavoine. Alavoine wants to explain his personal side of the story to a judge handling his legal case, as his trial did not reveal the true motives for the crime. In the letter, he tries to explain what sort of man he is and how he came to commit his crime.

The son of a brutish peasant farmer in the Vendée and his effacing wife, Alavoine qualified as a physician and bought a practice in the town of La Roche-sur-Yon. After his first wife died in childbirth (leaving behind two daughters), his widowed mother looked after him and his family. He later married the bourgeois Armande, who, with the tact and style he lacked, was soon dominating his home, medical practice, and all aspects of his life.

Never convincing himself of his role as healer and pillar of the community, he was easy prey to a young woman named Martine. Alavoine sensed her deeply hidden pain, even if, at first, he could not diagnose it. Martine was from Belgium, a drifter, existing on odd secretarial jobs and one-night stands with passing men. Although Martine was neither beautiful nor sophisticated, she and Alavoine instantly enjoyed passionate sex and had an intense desire to be together. Alavoine hired Martine as his medical assistant (with Armande's reluctant agreement) in a scheme to spend time with her. Alavoine became obsessed with learning everything about Martine's past and "cleansing" her of her sins, which he attributes to an "Other" Martine, who must be erased. This lasted until Armande caught them in an adulterous act and banished them from the family house. The guilty pair went to Paris, where Alavoine acquired a practice with a flat in a working-class district.

At last, able to spend all their time together, their relationship deepened, but in the process exposed the deep psychological flaws in both parties. As he learned how bruised and vulnerable she was from past troubles, Alavoine beat Martine in the name of exorcising his own "phantoms" of jealousy. One night, he decided that the only way to end this descending spiral into depravity was to strangle her. Alavoine claims in retrospect that the act of murder had the effect of killing Martine's "Other" while allowing the "real" Martine that he created to live on in him.

The last chapter notes briefly that by the time this confession reached its addressee, Alavoine had committed suicide in the prison infirmary.

== Background ==
Act of Passion is one of the first novels Simenon wrote after emigrating to the US. Before this novel, he wrote Trois Chambres à Manhattan, Maigret à New York, Au bout du rouleau and Le Clan des Ostendais in the first half of the year 1946. He then took a break of 6 months, which, according to Pierre Assouline, was a clear sign that a Simenon classic was in the offing.

In writing this novel, Simenon broke new ground, not only by choosing to use a first-person narrator. He developed the original idea at Bradenton Beach at the beginning of November, writing the final version, according to Patrick Marnham, "in Florida's oppressive December heat", sitting at his typewriter dressed only in a few sweat bands. As with his first American novel, Trois Chambres à Manhattan, Simenon's inspiration for Act of Passion was rooted in his passionate affair at the end of 1945 with the French-Canadian Denyse Ouimet, who was later to become his second wife. Alavoine shares many of Simenon's characteristics, but he is also troubled by the ghosts of jealousy. The character of Martine, although she comes from Lüttich, as did Simenon, was modeled on Denyse, and she even has a scar from an old operation on her abdomen. The asexual nature of Alavoine's wife reminds us of the same trait in Simenon's first wife, Tigy. Likewise, Alavoine's dominant mother reflects Simenon's mother. It is typical for Simenon to distill the darker moments from his own life into a fictional story. Alavoine's violence towards his lover stems from Simenon's violent relationship with Denyse, who later recalls that he used to beat her, even while he was writing the novel.

According to Patrick Marnham, Les Vacances de Maigret is a similar novel that once again uses the fatal jealousy of a doctor to help Simenon finally rid himself of his ghosts.

In a letter to André Gide, Simenon wrote, "It took me twelve months to write Act of Passion. I do not know if it was worth the trouble. I wrote it in order to rid myself of my ghosts, not to commit the same deed carried out by my protagonist. Since then, in the meantime over a year, I have had the feeling that I have started a new life, a life that is as full and juicy as a ripe fruit." In an interview with the magazine Combat, he explained that in 1959 he viewed Trois Chambres à Manhattan, Act of Passion, Antoine et Julie and Feux Rouges as significant steps in the process of his work that took him from the motif of resignation to that of a newer and fuller life.

== Interpretation ==
Peter Kaiser describes "Lettre á mon juge" as the “chronicle of an obsession.” According to Ansgar Lange it is about two people clinging to each other to avoid drowning, who ultimately drown anyway; Whether their love was more passion or mania. Here, Simenon uses the myth of the femme fatale, a woman both beguiling and vulnerable. Patrick Marnham regards "Trois Chambres à Manhattan" and "Lettre à mon juge" as two of Simenon's “most significant studies on sexual jealousy and obsession.” In both cases, two lovers look over the edge of the abyss. While the first book ultimately takes a positive turn, "Lettre à mon juge" goes further. The “ghosts” of jealousy overpower Alavoine, and the hopeless story can thus only end in death. Through the murder, says Becker, Alavoine exorcizes that part of Martine that always stood between them. By committing suicide, he attempts to reunite with her and finally states: “we went as far as possible. We did all that we could. We wanted absolute love.”

David Platten compares Lettre à mon juge with Flaubert's Madame Bovary, where also the monotony of provincial life is contrasted with the lofty plans of an extramarital affair. But while Flaubert parodies both ways of life, Simenon clearly takes sides for love in his novel, which in fact can be destructive, but is preferable to a bland middle-class existence at any time. Alavoine senses that life has more to offer than what has been bestowed on him. Although he succeeds to break out of the prison of his milieu, he then becomes the prison guard of his lover. On their last day together they both recognize each other in a pair of chimpanzees in the zoo, which nestle to each other under the gaze of the visitors. The lovers have created their own prison behind invisible bars, which leaves them only the way to death. According to Pierre Assouline, Avaloine is a prototype of the Simenonian hero, who is no longer able to control his fate out of an average existence, and almost inevitably stumbles against the abyss. In the novel, he refers to himself as a "casual criminal".

As seen in numerous other works by Simenon, the novel is also an expression of an urgent need for communication and understanding, which has no place in the judicial process. The first lines underline Alavoine's desperate efforts to attain this understanding: „My Lord, somebody, one person at least ought to understand me. And I wish you to be that person.“ In another part of the novel Alavoine mentions one of Simenon's credo: "It is a terrifying thought that despite all being human and struggling under an unknown sky, we refuse to make a little effort to understand each other. “ The irony of the novel is that Alavoine turns to Judge Coméliau of all people, Maigret´s antagonist in the Maigret novels, whose snobbery and moral prejudices consistently obstruct his look of the human truth. It seems Lucille F. Becker will give a negative response to the open-ended question of whether Alavoine gained any understanding through his letter. This reflects Simenon's worldview, which purports that the individual remains locked in their solitude.

== Reception ==
The English translation Act of Passion became one of Simenon's best-selling books in his adopted home, the USA. By 1958 it had sold 350,000 copies. The Saturday Review reported, "Perhaps inevitably, Simenon has decided to abandon the static form of the detective story and to write novels about the eternal conflict between good and evil." Similarly, Kirkus Reviews described the novel as more of a psychological investigation into the motives for murder than the criminal investigations of earlier years, whereby Lettre à mon juge stood in the tradition of Simenon's successes La Neige était sale and Le Temps d'Anaïs. On the other hand, in the New York Times Anthony Boucher wrote of Simenon that he was "simply more wordy, more pretentious, and a good deal less effective. There is hardly a Maigret story that does not rank, whether as entertainment or as serious literature, well above Act of Passion."

In the meantime, Act of Passion is one of Simenon's most prestigious novels. It was the Simenon novel that particularly impressed Henry Miller. John Banville spoke of a "dark and frightening book like all of Simenon's romans durs". François Bondy describes Simenon as at "the height of his powers" with his mastery of "intense concentration and simplification". Similarly, the journal of Austria's social democratic party Die Zukunft wrote: "It is amazing the amount of atmosphere Simenon can create with his concise style."

== Adaptations ==
The film Le fruit défendu (English: Forbidden Fruit) was released in 1952 and directed by Henri Verneuil. Amongst others, the following actors appeared in the film: Fernandel, Sylvie, Françoise Arnoul, Claude Nollier, Jacques Castelot, and Raymond Pellegrin. According to Lucille F. Becker, the film sticks very closely to the novel, making it one of the more successful Simenon adaptations. In the film, the moral ambiguity and fatal obsession of the novel become a simple love triangle in which the doctor, played by Fernandel, stands between duty and temptation. The happy ending with his return to his devoted wife, satisfies the moral expectations of the film audience.

In 1985 the Bayerischer Rundfunk produced a radio play directed by Wolf Euba. The leading roles were taken by Peter Dirschauer, Else Quecke, Irene Clarin, Ilse Neubauer, and Elisabeth Volkmann. Hans Peter Bögel read the novel for the Südwestrundfunk. Frank Focketyn played Charles Alavoine in the one-person play Brief aan meen Rechter, directed by Johan Simons. The premiere took place on 13 November 2009 at NTGent in Ghent, Belgium.
