= Spring, Autumn and Love =

- Directed by: Gilles Grangier
- Written by: Raymond Asso (novel); Gilles Grangier; Henri Jeanson; Jean Manse
- Produced by: Jacques Bar; Robert Chabert; Ernest Rupp
- Starring: Fernandel; Nicole Berger; Andrex
- Cinematography: Armand Thirard
- Edited by: Christian Gaudin
- Music by: Claude Valery
- Production companies: Cité Films; CIRAC; Fidès; Francinex
- Distributed by: Cinédis (France); CEIAD (Italy)
- Release date: 12 April 1955
- Running time: 95 minutes
- Countries: France; Italy
- Language: French

Spring, Autumn and Love (French: Le printemps, l'automne et l'amour) is a 1955 French-Italian comedy drama film directed by Gilles Grangier and starring Fernandel, Nicole Berger and Andrex.

The film's sets were designed by Jacques Colombier.

== Cast ==
- Fernandel as Fernand 'Noël' Sarrazin
- Nicole Berger as Cécilia
- Andrex as Blancard
- Georges Chamarat as Bourriol
- Denise Grey as La cliente
- Gaston Rey as Antoine Sarrazin
- Maria Zanoli as Anais
- Jacqueline Noëlle as Monique
- Mag-Avril as La première commère
- Madeleine Sylvain as Mme. Calvette
- Edmond Ardisson as Le facteur
- Enrico Glori as Le maître d'hôtel
- Julien Maffre as Le lampiste
- René Worms as Le voyageur
- Geo Georgey as Le boucher
- Jenny Hélia as La cliente des négociants
- Marthe Marty as La deuxième commère
- Viviane Méry as La marchand de journaux
- Manuel Gary as Victor
- Philippe Nicaud as Jean Balestra
- Claude Nollier as Julie Sarrazin
- Bruce Kay as L'Américain
- Liliane Robin as La femme de chambre
- Fernand Sardou as Calvette
- Jackie Sardou

== Bibliography ==
- Parish, James Robert. Film Actors Guide. Scarecrow Press, 1977.
