= Serjius =

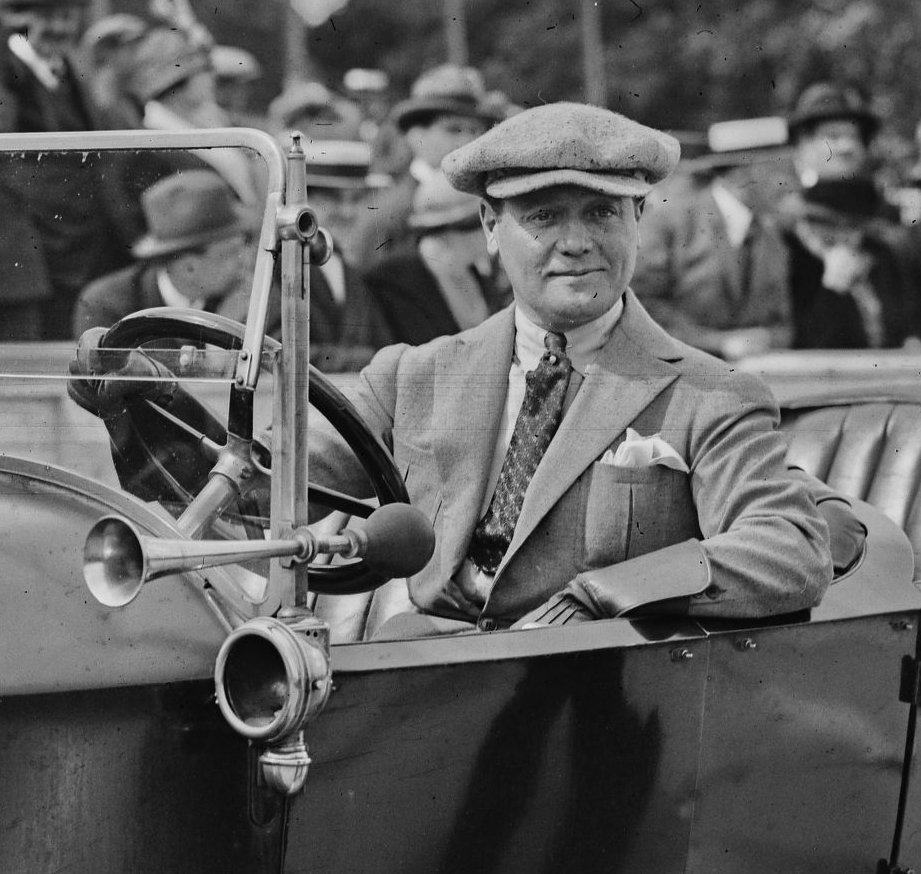
- Born: Serge, Jacques, Léon Halpryn; 22 November 1878; 20th arrondissement of Paris
- Died: 26 November 1966 (aged 88); Paris
- Occupations: Stage and film actor

Serjius (real name was Serge Jacques Léon Halpryn) (22 November 1878 – 26 October 1966) was a French stage and film actor.

== Filmography ==
- 1932: L'affaire de la rue de Lourcine by Marcel Dumont
- 1932: The Crowd Roars by Howard Hawks and Jean Daumery as Spud
- 1932: The Three Musketeers by Henri Diamant-Berger as Mousqueton
- 1933: Miquette by Henri Diamant-Berger as the impresario
- 1934: Laquelle des deux ? by Pierre Miquel – short film – as Le chef de gare
- 1935: Une demi-heure en correctionnelle by Henri Diamant-Berger – short film –
- 1935: La Grande vie by Henri Diamant-Berger – short film –
- 1935: Bout de chou by Henry Wulschleger
- 1935: Coup de vent by Jean Dréville and Giovacchino Forzano
- 1935: Debout là-dedans ! by Henri Wulschleger
- 1935: Son Excellence Antonin by Charles-Félix Tavano
- 1936: 27 Rue de la Paix by Richard Pottier
- 1936: Temptation by Pierre Caron – Philippe de Bergue
- 1936: A Hen on a Wall by Maurice Gleize as Gustave
- 1937: Arsene Lupin, Detective by Henri Diamant-Berger as Joseph
- 1937: The West by Henri Fescourt
- 1937: La Tour de Nesle by Gaston Roudès as Jehan
- 1938: Paid Holidays by Maurice Cammage as a gangster
- 1939: The Porter from Maxim's by Maurice Cammage
- 1939: The Five Cents of Lavarede by Maurice Cammage as a warden

== Theatre ==
- 1940: Le Bossu by Paul Féval and Auguste Anicet-Bourgeois, directed by Robert Ancelin, Théâtre de la Porte-Saint-Martin
- 1941: Le Maître de forges by Georges Ohnet, directed by Robert Ancelin, Théâtre de la Porte-Saint-Martin
- 1941: Les Deux Orphelines by Adolphe d'Ennery and Eugène Cormon, directed by Robert Ancelin, Théâtre de la Porte-Saint-Martin
- 1941: Les Deux Gosses by Pierre Decourcelle, directed by Robert Ancelin, Théâtre de la Porte-Saint-Martin
- 1942: Occupe-toi d'Amélie! by Georges Feydeau, directed by Robert Ancelin, Théâtre de la Porte-Saint-Martin
