= The Italian Straw Hat (1941 film) =

1941 film

- Directed by: Maurice Cammage
- Written by: Maurice Cammage; Jacques Chabannes; Francis Claude; Jean Nemours
- Based on: The Italian Straw Hat by Eugène Labiche and Marc-Michel
- Produced by: Paul Guien
- Starring: Fernandel; Josseline Gaël; Fernand Charpin
- Cinematography: Willy Faktorovitch; Jean-Paul Goreaud
- Edited by: Raymond Leboursier
- Music by: Vincent Scotto
- Production company: Prodiex
- Distributed by: Ciné Sélection
- Release date: 22 February 1941
- Running time: 85 minutes
- Country: France
- Language: French

The Italian Straw Hat (French: Un chapeau de paille d'Italie) is a 1941 French comedy film directed by Maurice Cammage and starring Fernandel, Josseline Gaël and Fernand Charpin. It is based on the 1851 The Italian Straw Hat by Eugène Labiche and Marc-Michel, which had previously been adapted into a 1928 silent film of the same title. It was made at the Marseille Studios in the Unoccupied Zone of France. The film's sets were designed by the art director Robert Giordani.

== Cast ==
- Fernandel as Fadinard
- Josseline Gaël as Anaïs Beauperthuis
- Fernand Charpin as Beauperthuis
- Édouard Delmont as Vésinet
- Jacqueline Laurent as Hélène
- Thérèse Dorny as La baronne
- Félicien Tramel as Nonancourt
- Andrex as Achille de Rosalba
- Jean-Pierre Kérien as Félix
- Sonia Gobar as La femme de chambre
- Lucien Callamand as L'ordonnateur
- Jacqueline Roman as Virginie
- Simone Paris as Clara
- Jean Mello as Bobin
- Milly Mathis as Tante Agathe
- Jacques Erwin as Émile

== Bibliography ==
- Goble, Alan. The Complete Index to Literary Sources in Film. Walter de Gruyter, 1999.
- Rège, Philippe. Encyclopedia of French Film Directors, Volume 1. Scarecrow Press, 2009.
- Siclier, Jacques. La France de Pétain et son cinéma. H. Veyrier, 1981.
