= The Woman in Red (1947 film) =

1947 film

- Directed by: Louis Cuny
- Written by: Louis Cuny; Yves Furet; Roland Gautier; Anne Golon; Jacques Viot
- Produced by: Hélène Cuny; Louis Cuny
- Starring: Jean Debucourt; Pierre Larquey; Andrex
- Cinematography: Pierre Montazel
- Edited by: Maurice Serein
- Music by: Tony Aubin; Louis Gasté
- Production companies: Celia Film; Consortium du Film
- Distributed by: Consortium du Film
- Release date: 21 May 1947
- Running time: 90 minutes
- Country: France
- Language: French

The Woman in Red (French: La femme en rouge) is a 1947 French crime film directed by Louis Cuny and starring Jean Debucourt, Pierre Larquey and Andrex.

The film's sets were designed by the art director Lucien Carré.

== Plot summary ==
Amateur detective Roland Gautier (Yves Furet) investigates the theft of two paintings.

== Cast ==
- Jean Debucourt as Imaneff
- Pierre Larquey as Le père Simon
- Andrex as Le chef des gangsters
- Simone Sylvestre as Irmène
- Louis Seigner as Malvet
- Daniel Gélin as Saladin
- Jean Brochard as Le commissaire
- André Gabriello as Hector
- Raymond Pellegrin as Jean Talais
- Colette Fleuriot as La fleuriste
- Yves Furet as Le détective Roland Gautier
- Monique Arthur as Martine
- Caroline Carone
- Marius David
- Albert Duvaleix as Souliac
- Ky Duyen as Le Chinois
- Lucien Hector as Le valet de chambre
- Jacques Henley as Le commissaire-priseur
- Albert Lyjo as Marcel
- Marcel Melrac
- Julienne Paroli as La femme de chambre
- Pierre Réal
- Germaine Stainval as Une invitée
- Sylvain
- Paul Villé as Le peintre
- Léon Walther as Le directeur des Beaux-Arts

== Bibliography ==
- Rège, Philippe. Encyclopedia of French Film Directors, Volume 1. Scarecrow Press, 2009.
