= Alain Terrane =

French actor

- Born: 17 July 1923; Bandol (Var)
- Died: 28 February 2000 (aged 76); Mougins (Alpes-Maritimes)
- Occupation: Actor

Alain Terrane (17 July 1923 - 28 February 2000) was a French actor.

== Filmography ==
- 1948: Man to Men (by Christian-Jaque) - (uncredited)
- 1949: Le Grand Cirque (by Georges Péclet)
- 1949: Branquignol (by Robert Dhéry) - (uncredited)
- 1949: The Patron (by Robert Dhéry) - Lechâtellier
- 1951: Casabianca (by Georges Péclet) - 'Mistral', tall sailor
- 1951: Fortuné de Marseille (by Henry Lepage and Pierre Méré)
- 1952: Les Révoltés du Danaé (by Georges Péclet)
- 1953: Thérèse Raquin (by Marcel Carné) - Un camionneur
- 1953: Julietta (by Marc Allégret) - (uncredited)
- 1953: Tabor (by Georges Péclet) - (final film role)
