= Girls of the Night (1958 film) =

1959 French–German–Italian film

- Directed by: Maurice Cloche
- Written by: Maurice Cloche; Georges Tabet
- Produced by: Lucien Vittet
- Starring: Georges Marchal; Nicole Berger; Claus Holm
- Cinematography: Jacques Mercanton
- Edited by: Fanchette Mazin
- Music by: Guy Magenta
- Production companies: Comptoir d'Expansion Cinématographique; Constantin Film
- Distributed by: Warner Brothers (France); Constantin Film (W. Germany)
- Release date: 17 April 1958
- Running time: 99 minutes
- Countries: France; Italy; West Germany
- Language: French

Girls of the Night (French: Filles de nuit, German: Denn keiner ist ohne Sünde) is a 1958 French–German–Italian drama film directed by Maurice Cloche and starring Georges Marchal, Nicole Berger and Claus Holm.

== Cast ==
- Georges Marchal as Charly
- Nicole Berger as Néda
- Claus Holm as Father Hermann
- Kai Fischer as Marlène
- Gil Vidal as Paul
- Waltraut Haas as Frau Robbé
- Bum Krüger as Herr Robbé
- Scilla Gabel as Lola
- Georges Chamarat as prior
- Renato Baldini as Marco
- Jandeline as Frau Martin, director of the Clairière
- Ruth Wilbert as Dr. Laban
- Simone Angèle
- Jannick Arvel
- Dominique Davray
- Jean-Jacques Delbo
- Marianne Girard
- Henri-Jacques Huet as policeman
- Robert Le Béal
- Anne-Marie Mersen
- Dominique Page
- Nicole Riche

== Production ==
The film's sets were designed by the art director Robert Giordani.
