= Happy Hearts (1932 film) =

1932 film

- Directed by: Hanns Schwarz; Max de Vaucorbeil
- Written by: Henry Koster; Jean Guignebert
- Produced by: Herman Millakowsky
- Starring: Josseline Gaël; Gabriel Gabrio; Jean Gabin
- Cinematography: Eugen Schüfftan
- Edited by: Herbert B. Fredersdorf
- Music by: Paul Abraham
- Production company: Pathé-Natan
- Distributed by: Pathé-Natan
- Release date: 2 December 1932
- Running time: 77 minutes
- Country: France
- Language: French

Happy Hearts (French:Coeurs joyeux) is a 1932 French comedy film directed by Hanns Schwarz and Max de Vaucorbeil and starring Josseline Gaël, Gabriel Gabrio and Jean Gabin. A separate German-language version Gypsies of the Night was also released.

== Cast ==
- Josseline Gaël as Lucette
- Gabriel Gabrio as Olivier
- Jean Gabin as Charles
- Lucien Callamand
- René Bergeron
- Georges Vitray
- Marcel Delaître
- Paul Amiot
- Henri Vilbert

== Bibliography ==
- Hans-Michael Bock and Tim Bergfelder. The Concise Cinegraph: An Encyclopedia of German Cinema. Berghahn Books.
