= Pierre and Jean (film) =

1943 film

- Directed by: André Cayatte
- Written by: André-Paul Antoine; André Cayatte
- Based on: Pierre and Jean by Guy de Maupassant
- Produced by: Alfred Greven
- Starring: Renée Saint-Cyr; Noël Roquevert; Jacques Dumesnil
- Cinematography: Charles Bauer
- Edited by: Marguerite Beaugé
- Music by: Roger Dumas
- Production company: Continental Films
- Distributed by: L'Alliance Cinématographique Européenne
- Release date: 29 December 1943
- Running time: 72 minutes
- Country: France
- Language: French

Pierre and Jean (French: Pierre et Jean) is a 1943 French drama film directed by André Cayatte and starring Renée Saint-Cyr, Noël Roquevert and Jacques Dumesnil. It is based on the novel Pierre and Jean by Guy de Maupassant. It was shot at the Billancourt Studios and Neuilly Studios in Paris and on location in Gournay-sur-Marne. The film's sets were designed by the art director Andrej Andrejew.

== Cast ==
- Renée Saint-Cyr as Alice
- Noël Roquevert as Marcel Roland
- Jacques Dumesnil as Le docteur Henri Marchat
- Gilbert Gil as Pierre Roland
- Bernard Lancret as Jean Roland
- Solange Delporte as Louise Roland
- René Génin as Pascaud
- Paul Barge as Le garçon de la guinguette
- Dany Bill as Pierre Roland enfant
- Georges Chamarat as Carbonnel
- Raymond Raynal as Le boxeur
- Huguette Vivier as Loulou Vertu

== Bibliography ==
- Crisp, C.G. The Classic French Cinema, 1930-1960. Indiana University Press, 1993.
- Leteux, Christine. Continental Films: French Cinema under German Control. University of Wisconsin Press, 2022.
