= Dirty Hands (1951 film) =

1951 film

- Directed by: Fernand Rivers; Simone Berriau
- Written by: Jacques-Laurent Bost; Fernand Rivers
- Based on: Dirty Hands by Jean-Paul Sartre
- Produced by: Fernand Rivers; Simone Berriau
- Starring: Pierre Brasseur; Daniel Gélin; Claude Nollier
- Cinematography: Jean Bachelet
- Edited by: Yvonne Martin
- Music by: Paul Misraki
- Production companies: Eden Productions; Les Films Fernand Rivers
- Distributed by: Les Films Fernand Rivers
- Release date: 29 August 1951
- Running time: 103 minutes
- Country: France
- Language: French

Dirty Hands (French: Les Mains sales) is a 1951 French drama film directed by Fernand Rivers and Simone Berriau and starring Pierre Brasseur, Daniel Gélin and Claude Nollier. It is an adaptation of the 1948 play Dirty Hands by Jean-Paul Sartre. It was shot at the Neuilly Studios in Paris. The film's sets were designed by the art directors Robert Dumesnil and René Renoux.

== Cast ==
- Pierre Brasseur as Hoederer
- Daniel Gélin as Hugo Barine
- Claude Nollier as Olga
- Monique Arthur as Jessica Barine
- Georges Chamarat as Barine
- Marcel André as Karski
- Roland Bailly as Slick
- Eddy Rasimi as Georges
- Robert Le Béal as Louis
- Henri San Juan as Léon
- Alfred Argus as Guillaume
- Gérard Buhr as Presder
- Christian Marquand as Dimitri
- Alfred Goulin as Laurent
- Jacques Castelot as Le Prince

== Bibliography ==
- Bessy, Maurice & Chirat, Raymond. Histoire du cinéma français: encyclopédie des films, 1940–1950. Pygmalion, 1986
- Goble, Alan. The Complete Index to Literary Sources in Film. Walter de Gruyter, 1999.
- Rège, Philippe. Encyclopedia of French Film Directors, Volume 1. Scarecrow Press, 2009.
