= Bouquet of Joy =

1951 film

- Directed by: Maurice Cam
- Written by: Pierre Guichard; Fernand Milhaud
- Produced by: Pierre Guichard
- Starring: Charles Trenet; Tilda Thamar; Hélène Bellanger
- Cinematography: Raymond Clunie
- Edited by: Germaine Artus
- Music by: Charles Trenet
- Production company: Sonofilm
- Distributed by: Sonofilm
- Release date: 25 October 1951
- Running time: 88 minutes
- Country: France
- Language: French

Bouquet of Joy (French: Bouquet de joie) is a 1951 French musical comedy film directed by Maurice Cam and starring Charles Trenet, Tilda Thamar and Hélène Bellanger. The film's sets were designed by the art director Eugène Piérac.

== Cast ==
- Charles Trenet as Charles Trenet
- Tilda Thamar as Anita
- Hélène Bellanger as Simone
- Roland Armontel as Le gendarme
- Jean Lefebvre as Georges
- Henri Poupon as Self
- Tomas et ses Merry Boys as The band
- Lucien Callamand
- Francis Gag
- Edouard Hemme
- Hennery
- Jenny Hélia
- Milly Mathis
- Vera Talchi

== Bibliography ==
- Bessy, Maurice & Chirat, Raymond. Histoire du cinéma français: 1951–1955. Pygmalion, 1989.
- Rège, Philippe. Encyclopedia of French Film Directors, Volume 1. Scarecrow Press, 2009.
