= Casabianca (film) =

1951 film

- Directed by: Georges Péclet
- Written by: Jeanne Saintenoy; Georges Péclet; Le Commandant Jean L'Herminier
- Produced by: André Zwobada; H. Vincent Brechignac
- Starring: Pierre Dudan; Gérard Landry; Alain Terrane
- Cinematography: Georges Million
- Edited by: Eliane Bensdorp
- Music by: Anna Marly; Marceau Van Hoorebecke
- Production company: Les Films Croix du Sud
- Distributed by: Astoria Films
- Release date: 18 May 1951
- Running time: 84 mins
- Country: France
- Language: French

Casabianca is a 1951 French war drama film directed by Georges Péclet and starring Pierre Dudan, Gérard Landry and Alain Terrane. It portrays the story of the French submarine Casabianca in World War Two. It is also known as Pirate Submarine and was released in the United States by Lippert Pictures in 1952. It was made in French and released in a dubbed English version. The French Navy submarine Le Glorieux, a sister ship of Casabianca, was used in the making of the film. Exteriors were shot in Algiers in French Algeria and the naval port of Toulon.

== Plot ==
The film is based on the true story of the Casabianca. Rather than be scuttled along with the rest of the French fleet in Toulon when German forces invaded the remainder of Unoccupied France in 1942, it escaped and crossed to Algiers which was now under the control of the Allies. It then participated in the successful liberation of Corsica by supporting an uprising by the Maquis.

== Cast ==
- Pierre Dudan as Sgt. Tony Luccioni
- Gérard Landry as Lt. Delac
- Jean Vilmont as Chief Engineer Marac
- Alain Terrane as 'Mistral', tall sailor
- Jean Vilar as Submarine Commandant Jean L'Herminier
- Michel Vadet as Captain Le Gallec
- Johnny Marchand as Landau
- Paulette Andrieux as Maria
- Alan Adair as Lt. Dudley
- Paul Mesnier as Admiral

== Bibliography ==
- Heptner, Tim (2006). Das Boot: auf der Suche nach der Crew der U 96 (in German). Deutsches Filmmuseum. ISBN 978-3-89487-550-3.
- Langlois, Suzanne (2001). La Résistance dans le cinéma français, 1944-1994: de la libération de Paris à Libera me (in French). Harmattan. ISBN 978-2-7475-0775-2.
