= First of May (1958 film) =

1958 film by Luis Saslavsky

- Directed by: Luis Saslavsky
- Written by: Claude Heymann; Luis Saslavsky
- Produced by: Sacha Gordine
- Starring: Yves Montand; Yves Noël; Nicole Berger
- Cinematography: Marcel Grignon
- Edited by: Gabriel Rongier
- Music by: Michel Emer
- Production companies: Gemma Cinematografica; Prosagor
- Distributed by: Lux Compagnie Cinématographique de France
- Release date: 25 March 1958
- Running time: 85 minutes
- Countries: France; Italy
- Language: French

First of May (French: Premier mai) is a 1958 French-Italian comedy film directed by Luis Saslavsky and starring Yves Montand, Yves Noël and Nicole Berger.

== Cast ==
- Yves Montand as Jean Meunier
- Yves Noël as François Meunier
- Nicole Berger as Annie Chapois
- Georges Chamarat as Henri Bousquet
- Bernadette Lange as Thérèse Meunier
- Georgette Anys as Mme Tartet
- Gabrielle Fontan as Mme Lurde
- Maurice Biraud as Blanchot
- Paul Demange as Le secrétaire du commissaire
- Laurent Terzieff as Maurice
- Gaby Basset as Une infirmière
- Jacques Berger
- Simone Berthier as La bru de Bousquet
- Louis Bugette as Le patron du bistrot
- Coutan-Lambert as Mme Chapuis
- Marie Glory as Une infirmière
- Gina Manès as Une commère
- Robert Pizani as Saint-Bertin
- Nicole Riche as Une entraîneuse
- Alice Sapritch as Une entraîneuse
- Yvette Sautereau
- Pierre Sergeol
- Paul Uny
- Walter Chiari as Gilbert
- Aldo Fabrizi as Le vieux camionneur

== Bibliography ==
- Rège, Philippe. Encyclopedia of French Film Directors, Volume 1. Scarecrow Press, 2009.
