= School for Journalists =

1936 film

- Directed by: Christian-Jaque
- Written by: Charles Lemontier
- Produced by: Jean-Pierre Frogerais
- Starring: Armand Bernard; Colette Darfeuil; Charles Lemontier
- Cinematography: Willy Faktorovitch
- Edited by: William Barache
- Music by: Henri Poussigue
- Production company: Productions Sigma
- Distributed by: Les Films Vog
- Release date: 29 May 1936
- Running time: 87 minutes
- Country: France
- Language: French

School for Journalists (French: L'école des journalistes) is a 1936 French comedy film directed by Christian-Jaque and starring Armand Bernard, Colette Darfeuil and Charles Lemontier. The film's sets were designed by the art director Jacques Gotko.

== Synopsis ==
An aspiring journalist attempts to set up an interview with the film star Clara Sergy, but complications ensue when his slow-witted photographer turns up and is mistaken for him.

== Cast ==
- Armand Bernard as Alfred
- Colette Darfeuil as Clara Sergy
- Charles Lemontier as Le brigadier
- Marcelle Praince as Mme Brigoule
- Marcel Vidal as Jacques Nerval
- Simone Renant as Simone Dubreuil
- Pierre Stéphen as Fernand Dubreuil
- Milly Mathis as Mariette
- Claire Gérard as Olympe
- Gustave Gallet as Le commandant Dubois
- Paul Villé as Le témoin
- Jean Kolb as Le directeur du journal
- Mona Dol as La femme de service
- Pierre Athon as Le gardien

== Bibliography ==
- Bessy, Maurice & Chirat, Raymond. Histoire du cinéma français: 1935–1939. Pygmalion, 1986.
- Crisp, Colin. Genre, Myth and Convention in the French Cinema, 1929–1939. Indiana University Press, 2002.
- Rège, Philippe. Encyclopedia of French Film Directors, Volume 1. Scarecrow Press, 2009.
