= Paid Holidays (film) =

1938 film

- Directed by: Maurice Cammage
- Written by: Georges Chaperot; Jean Rioux
- Produced by: Maurice Baqué; Paul Guien
- Starring: Frédéric Duvallès; Suzanne Dehelly; Christiane Delyne
- Cinematography: Georges Clerc
- Music by: Casimir Oberfeld
- Production company: Films B.G.
- Distributed by: Gallic Films
- Release date: 11 November 1938
- Running time: 75 minutes
- Country: France
- Language: French

Paid Holidays (French: Vacances payées) is a 1938 French comedy film directed by Maurice Cammage and starring Frédéric Duvallès, Suzanne Dehelly and Christiane Delyne.

== Synopsis ==
Prosper takes his annual leave in Monaco without his wife Sabine as he has a rendezvous planned with the attractive Olga. While there he wins a large fortune at the casino and becomes a target for three gangsters who wish to get their hands on the money.

== Cast ==
- Frédéric Duvallès as Prosper
- Suzanne Dehelly as Sabine
- Christiane Delyne as Olga Pannery
- Andrex as Gangster #1
- Serjius as Gangster #2
- Pedro Elviro as Gangster #3
- Léon Belières as Rambert
- Pierre Palau as Issoire
- Louis Florencie as Le contrôleur
- Georges Bever as Hector
- Marcel Vallée as L'inspecteur de police

== Bibliography ==
- Bessy, Maurice & Chirat, Raymond. Histoire du cinéma français: 1935-1939. Pygmalion, 1986.
- Crisp, Colin. Genre, Myth and Convention in the French Cinema, 1929-1939. Indiana University Press, 2002. ISBN 978-0-253-21516-1.
- Rège, Philippe. Encyclopedia of French Film Directors, Volume 1. Scarecrow Press, 2009.
