= Josseline Gaël =

French actress (1917–1995)

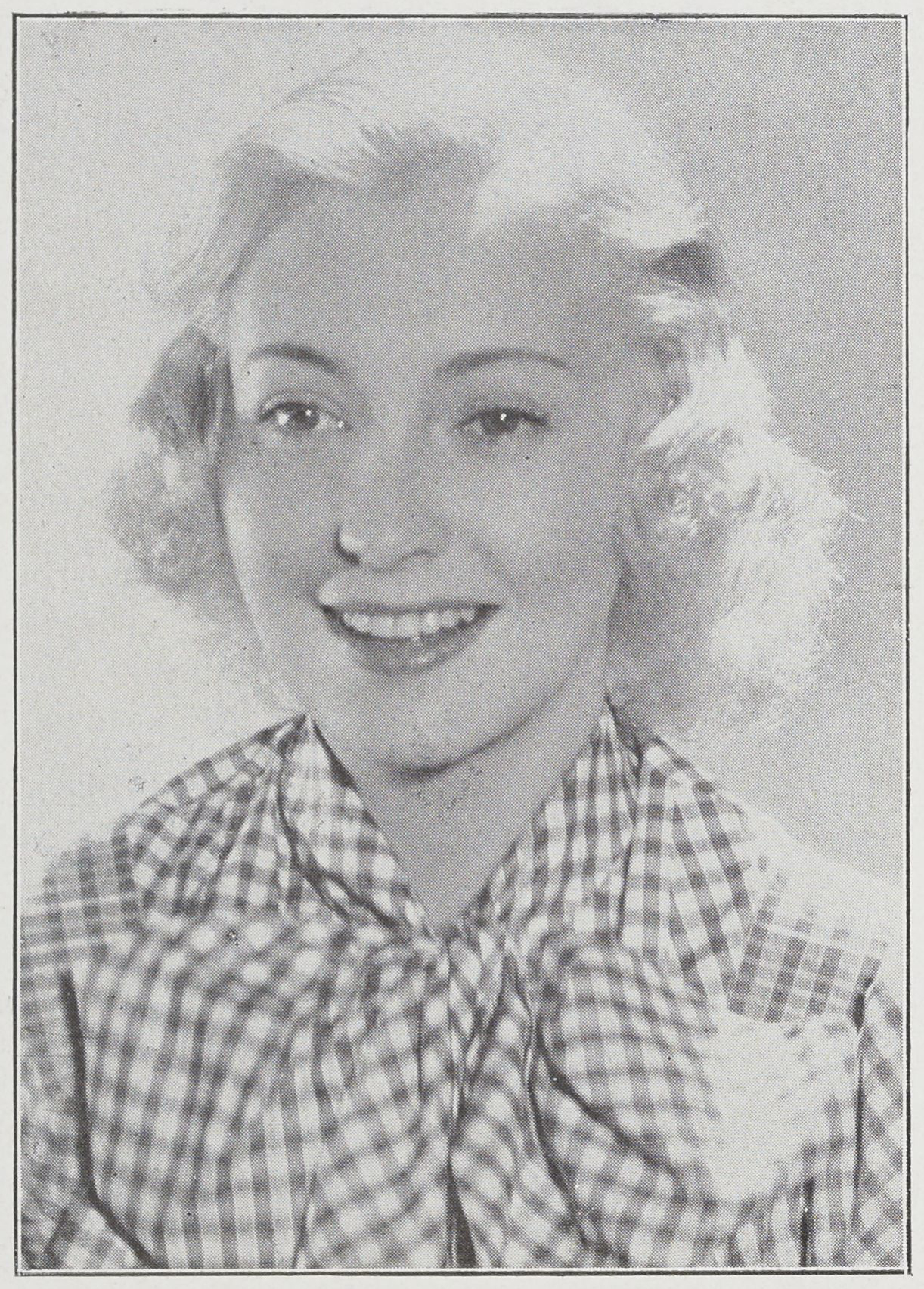
- Gaël in 1938
- Born: Jeannine Augustine Jeanne Blanleuil; 4 February 1917; Paris, France
- Died: 10 August 1995; Saint-Michel, Charente, France
- Occupation: Actress
- Partner: Jules Berry
- Children: 1

Josseline Gaël (born Jeannine Augustine Jeanne Blanleuil; 4 February 1917 – 10 August 1995) was a French actress who specialised in comedy roles. She is best remembered for her portrayal of Cosette in the 1934 film adaptation of Les Misérables. Her daughter with Jules Berry, Michèle, became a renowned art dealer.

== Partial filmography ==
- Le stigmate (1924) as Gaby
- Simone (1926) as Simone enfant
- Une femme a menti (1930) as Jacqueline Chapelain
- Love Songs (1930) as Simone Crespin
- The Lovers of Midnight (1931) as Fanny
- The Man at Midnight (1931) as Arlette
- All That's Not Worth Love (1931) as Claire
- Baleydier (1932) as Lola
- Pour un sou d'amour (1932) as Françoise
- Monsieur de Pourceaugnac (1932) as Julie
- Happy Hearts (1932) as Lucette
- The Abbot Constantine (1933) as Bettina Perceval
- Tambour battant (1933) as Anneliese
- Les Misérables (1934) as Cosette
- A Man of Gold (1934) as Marcelle
- Le bossu (1934) as Aurore de Caylus
- Les hommes de la côte (1934) as Janick
- Le monde où l'on s'ennuie (1935) as Suzanne de Villiers
- Monsieur Sans-Gêne (1935) as Monique Perrochin
- Jeunes filles à marier (1935) as Simone Guéneau
- Pluie d'or (1935) as Rose
- L'enfant du Danube (1936) as Hélène
- Monsieur Personne (1936) as Josette Verneau
- La madone de l'atlantique (1936) as Yvonne Dorland
- Wells in Flames (1937) as Mirka
- A Picnic on the Grass (1937) as Evelyne
- My Little Marquise (1937) as Monique Cormier
- Un scandale aux galeries (1937) as Laurence Coulaines
- The Two Schemers (1938) as Lucette
- Le monsieur de 5 heures (1938) as Madeleine Précardan
- Les femmes collantes (1938) as Eloïse Duboucher
- Barnabé (1938) as Mado
- Le plus beau gosse de France (1938) as Janine Pinsonnet
- Remontons les Champs-Élysées (1938) as Léone
- Grandfather (1939) as Solange Lavigne
- His Uncle from Normandy (1939) as Brigitte
- Facing Destiny (1940) as L'amie de Claude
- L'an 40 (1941) as Lucie
- The Italian Straw Hat (1941) as Anaïs Beauperthuis
- Room 13 (1942) as Geneviève d'Antibes
- The Snow on the Footsteps (1942) as Simone Norans
- La Main du diable (1943) as Irène
- A Dog's Life (1943) as Émilie Calumet
- The Midnight Sun (1943) as La princesse Armide Irénieff
- The Island of Love (1944) as Xénia (final film role)

== Bibliography ==
- Crisp, Colin. Genre, Myth and Convention in the French Cinema 1929-1939. Indiana University Press, 2002.
