= Le Grand Cirque (film) =

- Directed by: Georges Péclet
- Written by: André Castelot; Georges Péclet; Joseph Kessel
- Produced by: Robert Florat
- Starring: Pamela Skiff; Pierre Cressoy; Jean Barrère; Jean Christian; Édouard Delmont; Pierre Larquey
- Cinematography: Paul Cotteret
- Music by: Marcel Stern
- Distributed by: Imperator Films
- Release date: 10 March 1950 (France)
- Running time: 120 minutes
- Country: France
- Languages: English; French

Le Grand Cirque is a 1950 French war film directed by Georges Péclet. It is based on the memoir of the same name by Pierre Clostermann.

== Plot ==
Pierre Despont is seconded to a Free French squadron flying with the RAF at Biggin Hill Aerodrome, under the command of René Mouchotte. The fearless Despont becomes close friends with fellow pilots Jean Loessig and Jacques Desmarets, but the squadron's dangerous reconnaissance and combat missions in Spitfire Mk. IX fighters take their toll on the pilots. Loessig goes missing over Normandy during the D-Day landings while Desmarets is killed on the final day of combat in Europe, leaving his wife a widow. Despont survives the war but is left melancholy by the loss of his friends.

== Cast ==
- Pamela Skiff as Patricia
- Pierre Cressoy as Pierre Despont
- Jean Barrère as Jacques Desmarets
- Jean Christian as Captain Mouchotte
- Roger Saltel as Jean Loessig
- Édouard Delmont as Peasant
- Pierre Larquey as the priest
- Alexandre Dundas
- Alain Terrane
- Manuel Gary as Mechanic
- Jean Ozenne
- Jean Vilmont
- Anne Laurens as Sybil
- Jacques Roux as an aviator
- Jacques Marbeuf
- André Chanu

== Release ==
The film was a moderate success, taking $3,043,781 at the French box office.
