= Henri Nassiet =

French actor

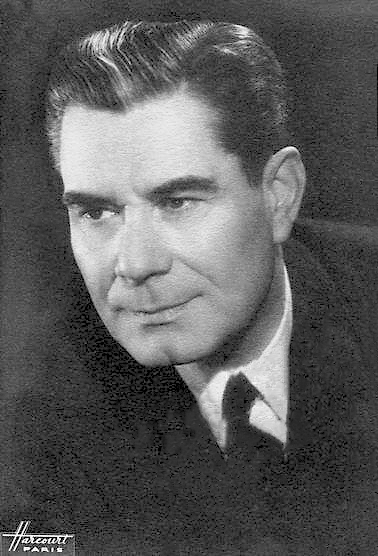
Henri Nassiet

Henri Nassiet (1895–1977) was a French actor.

== Selected filmography ==
- Maman Pierre (1922)
- La griffe du hasard (1937) - Séverac (uncredited)
- Life Dances On (1937) - Un policier
- The Innocent (1938)- Gregor
- La Glu (1938) - Le juge d'instruction
- Ma soeur de lait (1938) - Le second régisseur
- Fort Dolorès (1939)
- The Five Cents of Lavarede (1939) - Jack
- Behind the Facade (1939) - Minor rôle (uncredited)
- The End of the Day (1939) - Gaston Noblet
- Nightclub Hostess (1939) - Freddy
- The Phantom Carriage (1939) - Gustave
- Fire in the Straw (1939) - Despagnat
- Madame Sans-Gêne (1941) - Le maréchal Lefebvre
- Business Is Business (1942) - Dauphin
- La Grande Marnière (1943) - Le président du tribunal
- À la Belle frégate (1943) - Victor
- Jericho (1946) - Le commandant Munchhausen
- Mensonges (1946) - Le docteur Charles Leroux
- Le Bataillon du ciel (1947) - Bouvier
- False Identity (1947) - Georges Blondin
- Cab Number 13 (1948) - Le duc de la Tour Vaudieu (segments "Delitto" & "Castigo")
- The Cavalier of Croix-Mort (1948) - Vidocq
- La bataille du feu (1949) - Le colonel
- Mission in Tangier (1949) - Alexandre Segard
- Singoalla (1949) - Le chef gitan Latzo / Gypsy Chief (French version)
- One Only Loves Once (1950) - Monsieur de Bolestac
- La grande vie (1951) - M. Charles
- The Case Against X (1952) - L'industriel Paul Dorgères
- The Drunkard (1953) - Le docteur Marignan
- Le Guérisseur (1953) - Le Goff
- Blackmail (1955) - Maître Rougier - l'avocat d'Edouard Brisse
- Goubbiah, mon amour (1956) - Goubbiah's Father
- Cela s'appelle l'aurore (1956) - Angela's father
- Les Aventures de Till L'Espiègle (1956) - Marnix
- Michel Strogoff (1956) - Ivan Ogareff
- It's All Adam's Fault (1958) - Monsieur Gillet
- Le Saint mène la danse (1960) - Louis, le chauffeur
- Bernadette of Lourdes (1961) - Le curé Peyramale
- The President (1961) - Un ministre
- The Three Musketeers (1961) - M. de Treville
- The Triumph of Michael Strogoff (1961)
- Bay of Angels (1963) - M. Fournier - le père de Jean
- The Monocle Laughs (1964) - The Colonel
- Les petits chats (1965)
- The Things of Life (1970) - M. Bérard, le père de Pierre
- Law Breakers (1971) - Le président du tribunal
- Le Fils (1973)
- Le monde était plein de couleurs (1973) - Le vieux maître (final film role)
