= Milly Mathis =

French actress

- Born: Emilienne Pauline Tomasini; 8 September 1901; Marseilles, France
- Died: 30 March 1965 (aged 63); Salon-de-Provence, France
- Occupation: Actress
- Years active: 1927–1960

Milly Mathis (8 September 1901 – 30 March 1965) was a French actress who appeared in more than 100 films during her career. Born on 8 September 1901 as Emilienne Pauline Tomasini in Marseilles, France, she made her film debut with a small, uncredited role in the 1927 German film, Die Liebe der Jeanne Ney (English - The Love of Jeanne Ney). Most of her parts would be in featured or supporting roles. Her final performance would be in a featured role in French film, Business (1960). She was also an occasional performer on France's legitimate stage. She died on 30 March 1965 in Salon-de-Provence, France, and was buried in the Cimetière Saint-Pierre in Marseilles.

== Filmography ==
- The Love of Jeanne Ney (1927)
- Mephisto (1930)
- Après l'amour (1931)
- Atout Cœur (1931)
- Marius (1931)
- Le Roi du camembert (1931)
- Le Roi du cirage (1931)
- L’Amour et la Veine (1932)
- Fanny (1932)
- The Wonderful Day (1932)
- Paris-Méditerranée (1932)
- Ah! quelle gare! (1932)
- Make-Up (1932)
- Moune et son Notaire (1932)
- Prenez garde à la peinture (1932)
- Madame Salamandre, voyante (1932)
- Chassé-croisé (1932)
- Simone Is Like That (1933)
- The Illustrious Maurin (1933)
- High and Low (1933)
- C'était un musicien (1933)
- D'amour et d'eau fraîche (1933)
- La Prison de Saint-Clothaire(1933)
- The Scandal (1934)
- Tartarin of Tarascon (1934)
- Lake of Ladies (1934)
- The Crisis is Over (1934)
- Justin de Marseille (1934)
- Deux mille deux cent vingt deux CF 2 (1934)
- Série 7 No 77777 (1934)
- Lovers and Thieves (1935)
- Honeymoon (1935)
- Little One (1935)
- Juanita (1935)
- Gaspard de Besse (1935)
- Happy Arenas (1935)
- Suivez le guide (1935)
- La main passe (1935)
- Les frères Brothers (1935)
- A la manière de... (1935)
- Américan-bar (1935)
- Une femme qui se partage (1936)
- La Petite Dame du wagon-lit (1936)
- School for Journalists (936)
- Samson (1936)
- Avec le sourire (1936)
- Prête-moi ta femme (1936)
- Enfants de Paris (1936)
- La Rose effeuillée (1936)
- Jacques and Jacotte (1936)
- Prends la route (1936)
- Notre-Dame d'Amour (1936)
- Forty Little Mothers (1936)
- César (1936)
- Blanchette (1936)
- Gigolette (1937)
- The House Opposite (1937)
- La Fessée (1937)
- Life Dances On (1937)
- Regain (1937)
- Franco de port (1937)
- Les Gangsters de l’exposition (1937)
- Un meurtre a été commis (1937)
- Un soir à Marseille (1937)
- Nuits de prince (1938)
- Liberty (1938)
- I Was an Adventuress (1938)
- Légions d'honneur (1938)
- Gargousse (1938)
- Three Artillerymen at the Opera (1938)
- Champions of France (1938)
- Cavalcade d'amour (1938)
- Vous seule que j’aime (1938)
- Le Moulin dans le soleil (1938)
- Whirlwind of Paris (1939)
- Grandfather (1939)
- Une main a frappé (1939)
- Girls in Distress (1939)
- Personal Column (1939)
- The Well-Digger's Daughter (1940)
- The Marvelous Night (1940)
- Tobias Is an Angel (1940)
- The Italian Straw Hat (1941)
- La Troisième Dalle (1941)
- Parade en sept nuits (1941)
- Three Argentines in Montmartre (1941)
- La Prière aux étoiles (1941)
- Melody for You (1942)
- Room 13 (1942)
- Cap au large (1942)
- Simplet (1942)
- Coup de tête (1943)
- Bifur 3 (1944)
- Le Charcutier de Machonville (1946)
- Le Voleur se porte bien (1948)
- Toute la famille était là! (1948)
- La vie est un rêve (1948)
- Night Round (1949)
- Sending of Flowers (1949)
- The Treasure of Cantenac (1950)
- Topaze (1950)
- Bibi Fricotin (1950)
- Bouquet of Joy (1951)
- The Convict (1951)
- The Damned Lovers (1951)
- That Rascal Anatole (1951)
- The Passage of Venus (1951)
- Vol avec extraction (1951)
- In the Land of the Sun (1952)
- Manon of the Spring (1952)
- Quintuplets in the Boarding School (1953)
- Three Days of Fun in Paris (1954)
- Le Collège en folie (1954)
- Three Sailors (1957)
- Nous autres à Champignol (1957)
- La Blonde des Tropiques (1957)
- Le Désert de Pigalle (1957)
- Girl and the River (1958)
- Happy Arenas (1958)
- Business (1960)
