= 27, rue de la Paix =

1936 film

- Directed by: Richard Pottier
- Written by: Thomas Förster (play); Jacques Prévert; Carlo Rim; T.H. Robert
- Produced by: Herman Millakowsky
- Starring: Renée Saint-Cyr; Suzy Prim; Jules Berry
- Cinematography: Enzo Riccioni
- Music by: Joe Hajos
- Production company: Milo Film Productions
- Release date: 13 November 1936
- Running time: 100 minutes
- Country: France
- Language: French

27, rue de la Paix is a 1936 French crime film directed by Richard Pottier and starring Renée Saint-Cyr, Suzy Prim and Jules Berry.

== Plot ==
Gloria, an affluent and sophisticated woman, seeks to end her tumultuous marriage with her philandering husband, Denis. Desperate for assistance, she reaches out to a close acquaintance, who happens to be a lawyer with ties to both Gloria and Denis. In an attempt to gain an advantage, Gloria contemplates bribing Jenny, her husband's mistress.

However, the situation takes a sinister turn when Jenny is discovered murdered, her lifeless body found floating in the Seine river. As the evidence piles up against Denis, the weight of suspicion becomes overwhelming. Amidst the chaos, a young and intrepid journalist named Alice takes it upon herself to delve into the case, determined to uncover the hidden truth.

== Cast ==
- Renée Saint-Cyr as Gloria Grand
- Suzy Prim as Jenny Clarens
- Jules Berry as Denis Grand
- Jean Galland as Maître Jean Bernard
- Gaby Basset as Alice Perrin aka Jeanne Pinson
- Junie Astor as Olly
- Gabriel Signoret as Le procureur Montfort
- Jean Wall as Furet
- Julien Carette as Jules
- Serjius
- Viviane Gosset
- René Génin as Jules Fouillard
- Georges Paulais
- Philippe Richard as Police Official
- Georges Péclet
- Anthony Gildès as Montfort's Aide
- Jacques Berlioz
- Al Brown

== Bibliography ==
- Alastair Phillips. Rififi: French Film Guide. I.B.Tauris, 2009.
