= The Sheep Has Five Legs =

The Five-Legged Sheep Le Mouton à cinq pattes
- Directed by: Henri Verneuil
- Written by: Jean Marsan; Jacques Perret; Raoul Ploquin; Henri Troyat; Henri Verneuil
- Produced by: Raoul Ploquin
- Starring: Fernandel; Françoise Arnoul; Andrex
- Cinematography: Armand Thirard
- Edited by: Christian Gaudin
- Music by: Georges Van Parys
- Distributed by: Cocinor
- Release date: 24 September 1954 (France)
- Running time: 104 minutes
- Countries: France; USA
- Language: French

The Five-Legged Sheep (French: Le Mouton à cinq pattes) is a 1954 French comedy film directed by Henri Verneuil. It won the Golden Leopard at the Locarno International Film Festival and was nominated for the Academy Award for Best Story.

== Plot ==
An old farmer who has hated his five quintuplets for over twenty years is visited by villagers who believe they should be reunited, and a search for them begins.

== Cast ==
- Fernandel as Édouard Saint-Forget / Les quintuplés : Alain, Bernard, Charles, Désiré, Etienne
- Françoise Arnoul as Marianne Durand-Perrin
- Andrex as Un marin
- Édouard Delmont as Le docteur Bollène
- Georges Chamarat as M. Durand-Perrin, le père
- Paulette Dubost as Solange
- Louis de Funès as Pilate
- René Génin as Le maire
- Denise Grey as Mme Durand-Perrin, la mère
- Tony Jacquot as L'instituteur
- Ky Duyen as Un chinois
- Darío Moreno as Un matelot américain
- Noël Roquevert as Antoine Brissard
- Lolita López as Azitad
- Michel Ardan as Un marin
- Edmond Ardisson as Le brigadier
- Manuel Gary as Le docteur
- René Havard as Le liftier
- Yette Lucas as Mariette
- Albert Michel as Le patron du bistrot
- Gil Delamare as Le chauffard
- Leopoldo Francés as Le métis
- Nina Myral as La bonne
- Yannick Malloire as Une petite fille
- Raphaël Patorni as Rodrigue
- Max Desrau as Le nouveau patron des pompes funèbres
- Jocelyne Bressy
- Micheline Gary as L'hôtesse de l'instutut de beauté

== Reception ==
Bosley Crowther of The New York Times wrote that "it is probably the cleverest and most hilarious French comedy we've seen since the war." He added, "This reviewer is still laughing fondly at the fantastic humors it unfolds." Crowther saved his highest praise for Fernandel, saying that he "works harder than the rest of the cast rolled into one. We hope he was paid six salaries for this picture. He certainly earns them, every one."
