= Forbidden Fruit (1952 film) =

1952 film

- Film poster
- Directed by: Henri Verneuil
- Written by: Jacques Companéez; Jean Manse; Henri Verneuil
- Based on: Act of Passion by Georges Simenon
- Produced by: Ayres d'Aguiar; Ludmilla Goulian
- Starring: Fernandel; Françoise Arnoul; Claude Nollier
- Cinematography: Henri Alekan
- Edited by: Gabriel Rongier
- Music by: Paul Durand
- Production company: Gray-Film
- Distributed by: Cocinor
- Release date: 19 September 1952
- Running time: 100 minutes
- Country: France
- Language: French

Forbidden Fruit (French: Le Fruit défendu) is a 1952 French drama film directed by Henri Verneuil and starring Fernandel, Françoise Arnoul and Claude Nollier. Drawn from the novel Act of Passion (Lettre à mon juge) by Georges Simenon, it omits the book's grim resolution and instead invents a happy ending. The story it tells is of a doctor in a provincial city with a devoted wife and children who falls for a sexy but transient young woman and then loses her before his domestic and professional life are both ruined. It was shot at the Saint-Maurice Studios in Paris and on location around Marseille. The film's sets were designed by the art director Rino Mondellini with costumes by Pierre Balmain.

== Plot ==
Left a widower with two small daughters who are looked after by his widowed mother, Dr Pellegrin is a general practitioner in the city of Arles. At a party he sees a handsome and assured widow, Armande, who decides to be his next wife. Though she capably takes over his house, his children and the administration of his practice, the relationship lacks passion. He meets a forward young woman, Martine, who has come to Arles to find work, and after an evening's drinking spends the night with her in a hotel.

Under a transparent story of her being referred to him as a patient, he introduces her into his house. Armande is sympathetic to the girl and suggests that she can work as Pellegrin's assistant, the pay enabling her to live in lodgings. Amid the constraints of his job and his marriage, Pellegrin snatches moments with Martine when he can, but if she has a drink or a dance with anyone else he becomes insanely jealous.

Unable to take the strain of this artificial life with no future, in a strange town where everybody knows the doctor and where his wife must by now know all, Martine decides to get out. Pellegrin rushes home to pack a bag and join her, but cannot find her at the railway station. Walking home despondent, he sees her say goodbye to a man in a bar and get on a bus. Shattered, he returns to his welcoming wife.

== Cast ==
- Fernandel as Dr. Charles Pellegrin
- Françoise Arnoul as Martine Englebert
- Claude Nollier as Armande Barthelémy, the doctor's second wife
- Jacques Castelot as Boquet, owner of a bar
- René Génin as Dr. Marchandeau
- Fernand Sardou as Fontvielle
- Jackie Sardou as The boy's mother
- Pierrette Bruno as Toinette - la garde-barrière
- Manuel Gary as Jacky
- Micheline Gary as Léa
- Raymond Pellegrin as Octave
- Sylvie as Madame Pellegrin mère
- Hélène Tossy as Madame Rochemaure
- Jacques Gencel as Justin
