= Strange Fate =

- Directed by: Louis Cuny
- Written by: A. Lacombe (novel); Marcelle Maurette; Jean Sarment
- Produced by: Louis Cuny; André Paulvé
- Starring: Renée Saint-Cyr; Aimé Clariond; Henri Vidal
- Cinematography: Léonce-Henri Burel
- Music by: René Cloërec
- Production companies: Andre Paulve Film; Celia Film
- Release date: 5 June 1946
- Running time: 110 minutes
- Country: France
- Language: French

Strange Fate (French: Étrange destin) is a 1946 French drama film directed by Louis Cuny and starring Renée Saint-Cyr, Aimé Clariond and Henri Vidal.

The film's sets were designed by the art director Aimé Bazin.

== Cast ==
- Renée Saint-Cyr as Patricia
- Aimé Clariond as Le professeur Gallois
- Henri Vidal as Alain de Saulieu
- Nathalie Nattier as Germaine
- Denise Grey as Mme d'Evremond
- Robert Favart as L'assistant du professeur Gallois
- Gabrielle Fontan as Mme Durtain
- Hélène Bellanger
- Charlotte Ecard
- Luce Fabiole
- Gaston Girard
- Georges Gosset
- Marie-Thérèse Moissel
- Julienne Paroli
- Marcelle Rexiane
- Roger Rudel
- Jean-Charles Thibault

== Bibliography ==
- Cook, Samantha. Writers and production artists. St James Pr, 1993.
