= A Hen on a Wall =

1936 film

- Directed by: Maurice Gleize
- Written by: Léopold Marchand (play)
- Produced by: Henry Dory
- Starring: Jules Berry; Pierre Larquey; Christiane Delyne
- Cinematography: Willy Faktorovitch
- Edited by: Les Productions Pellegrin
- Music by: Henri Poussigue
- Production company: Productions Henry Doru
- Release date: 22 May 1936
- Running time: 90 minutes
- Country: France
- Language: French

A Hen on a Wall (French: Une poule sur un mur) is a 1936 French crime film directed by Maurice Gleize and starring Jules Berry, Pierre Larquey and Christiane Delyne. The title refers to a French children's song.

== Synopsis ==
A peasant girl claims she has been sexually assaulted. An investigating detective discovers this to be untrue, but also reveals hidden secrets about many of the village inhabitants.

== Cast ==
- Jules Berry as Henri Sornin
- Pierre Larquey as Bob Pouvrier
- Christiane Delyne as Betty Pouvrier
- Monique Rolland as Fossette Sornin
- Saturnin Fabre as Monsieur Amédée
- Sinoël as L'oncle Albert
- Jeanne Fusier-Gir
- Andrée Champeaux
- Serjius as Gustave
- René Alié
- Jacqueline Prévot
- Georges Bever
- Carlos Machado

== Bibliography ==
- Crisp, Colin. Genre, Myth and Convention in the French Cinema, 1929-1939. Indiana University Press, 2002.
