= Bay of Angels =

1963 film by Jacques Demy

- Theatrical release poster
- French: La Baie des Anges
- Directed by: Jacques Demy
- Written by: Jacques Demy
- Produced by: Paul-Edmond Decharme
- Starring: Jeanne Moreau; Claude Mann; Henri Nassiet; Nicole Chollet; Jacques Moreau; André Certes; Georges Alban; André Canter; Jean-Pierre Lorrain; Conchita Parodi; Paul Guers
- Cinematography: Jean Rabier
- Edited by: Anne-Marie Cotret
- Music by: Michel Legrand
- Production company: Sud-Pacifique Films
- Distributed by: Consortium Pathé
- Release date: 1 March 1963 (France)
- Running time: 89 minutes
- Country: France
- Language: French
- Box office: $100,000 (US)

Bay of Angels (French: La Baie des Anges) is a 1963 French romantic drama film written and directed by Jacques Demy. Starring Jeanne Moreau and Claude Mann, it is Demy's second film and deals with the subject of gambling. The costumes were designed by Pierre Cardin.

The film was Demy's last shot in black and white; his next film, The Umbrellas of Cherbourg (1964), used vivid colour.

== Plot ==
Jean Fournier is a quiet young bank employee in Paris, living with his widowed father. After accompanying his colleague Caron to a casino and winning at roulette, he decides to have a holiday on the French Riviera, despite his father's warning that gamblers always lose in the end. In the casino in Nice, he meets Jackie Demaistre, a middle-aged woman who has left her husband and infant son to pursue her compulsion. The two develop an emotional connection, though she warns him that she will sacrifice anything to keep on gambling, not for the money, she claims, but for the thrill. As her remaining belongings are in a suitcase at the railway station, where she plans to sleep, he offers her his hotel room. They drink, talk, and make love.

Back in the casino, the two win a fortune with which, having bought a sports car and smart clothes, they take a suite in Monte Carlo and hit the tables there. Losing everything, they take the train back to Nice, where Jean convinces his father to send him some money. When this too is lost in the casino, Jean calls it a day and walks off, saying that he is returning to Paris. Hurt at this double rejection, of her and of their gambling partnership, Jackie angrily tells him to go. Shortly afterwards, she runs after him and the two embrace in the sunset.

== Cast ==
- Jeanne Moreau as Jacqueline "Jackie" Demaistre
- Claude Mann as Jean Fournier
- Paul Guers as Caron
- Henri Nassiet as Monsieur Fournier
- André Certes as the bank director
- Nicole Chollet as Marthe
- Conchita Parodi as the hotel manager

== Reception ==
Metacritic, which uses a weighted average, assigned Bay of Angels a score of 76 out of 100, based on 6 critics, indicating "generally favorable" reviews.

Critics praised Moreau's performance, with Mann's being seen as weaker. For The New York Times, Eugene Archer wrote, "[Demy's] sympathetic film is handicapped by the casting of Claude Mann, whose tentative Jean proves too passive to carry the weight assigned him by the script. [...] The actress compenstates with a bravura demonstration of star power on the rampage. [Moreau] smolders, pouts, flounces, rages, giggles, suffers and claws, in an exhibition of cinematic personality reminiscent of Dietrich in her best Devil Is a Woman days. With unfaltering artistry, she transforms her director's intimate essay into a glittering vehicle to display her four-octave dramatic range."

Pauline Kael of The New Yorker wrote, "What would this film be like without Jeanne Moreau? Even if the dialogue and direction were the same, the meanings wouldn’t be. The picture is almost an emanation of Moreau, inconceivable without her. [...] His virtuoso sense of film rhythm turns this flimsy, capricious story about a gambling lady into a lyrical study in compulsion and luck. This is a magical, whirling little film, a triumph of style."
