= Grandfather (film) =

1939 film

- Directed by: Robert Péguy
- Written by: Robert Péguy
- Produced by: Charles Battesti
- Starring: Pierre Larquey; Josseline Gaël; Milly Mathis
- Cinematography: Willy Faktorovitch; Marcel Villet
- Music by: Henri Poussigue
- Production companies: B.A.P. Films; Films Bernard Natan
- Distributed by: Éclair-Journal
- Release date: 27 April 1939
- Running time: 55 minutes
- Country: France
- Language: French

Grandfather (French: Grand-père) is a 1939 French comedy drama film directed by Robert Péguy and starring Pierre Larquey, Josseline Gaël and Milly Mathis. The film's sets were designed by the art director René Renoux.

== Cast ==
- Pierre Larquey as Grand-père
- Josseline Gaël as Solange Lavigne
- Milly Mathis as La concierge, Madame Puche
- Jean Chevrier as Gérard Bréval
- Marcel Carpentier as Henri Lavigne
- Catherine Fonteney as Madame Mercourt
- Mauricette Mercereau as La petite Germaine
- Anna Névada as La jeune danseuse
- France Ellys as La directrice de l'école
- Julienne Paroli as Pauline
- Noëlle Norman as La surveillante
- Andrée Champeaux as La jeune femme
- Jeanne Lamy as Madame Frémiet
- François Rodon as Michel Puche
- Raymond Rognoni as Le médecin de l'école
- Gustave Gallet as Le directeur de l'Oeuvre
- Maurice Castel as Antoine
- Fernand Sardou as Le jeune homme

== Bibliography ==
- Bessy, Maurice & Chirat, Raymond. Histoire du cinéma français: encyclopédie des films, Volume 2. Pygmalion, 1986.
- Crisp, Colin. Genre, Myth and Convention in the French Cinema, 1929-1939. Indiana University Press, 2002.
- Rège, Philippe. Encyclopedia of French Film Directors, Volume 1. Scarecrow Press, 2009.
