= A Dog's Life (1943 film) =

1943 film

- Directed by: Maurice Cammage
- Written by: Jacques Chabannes; Jean Manse
- Based on: A Dog's Life by André Mycho
- Produced by: Emil Flavin
- Starring: Fernandel; Josseline Gaël; Félicien Tramel
- Cinematography: Willy Faktorovitch
- Music by: Raoul Moretti
- Production company: Optimax Films
- Distributed by: Les Films de Koster
- Release date: 25 June 1943
- Running time: 84 minutes
- Country: France
- Language: French

A Dog's Life (French: Une vie de chien) is a 1943 French comedy film directed by Maurice Cammage and starring Fernandel, Josseline Gaël and Félicien Tramel. It was shot in 1941 but its release was delayed. It was made at the Marseille Studios in the Unoccupied Zone of France. The film's sets were designed by the art director Robert Giordani.

== Synopsis ==
Gustave Bourdillon is a teacher in a boarding school for girls. When the headmaster dies, Gustave courts his much younger widow Émilie Calumet. However she is convinced that her husband has returned to earth as a dog and dotes on it. Gustave sets out to win her over, going so far as to disguise himself as a woman in order to take an examination on her behalf.

== Cast ==
- Fernandel as Gustave Bourdillon
- Josseline Gaël as Émilie Calumet
- Félicien Tramel as Triboule
- Jean-Pierre Kérien as Grégorius
- Francis Claude as Galloche
- Thérèse Dorny as Léocadie
- Jim Gérald as Calumet
- Édouard Delmont as Tournemire
- Médor as Le chien
- Gaston Orbal as Truphème
- Jean Pouzet as Postiche

== Bibliography ==
- Rège, Philippe. Encyclopedia of French Film Directors, Volume 1. Scarecrow Press, 2009.
- Siclier, Jacques. La France de Pétain et son cinéma. H. Veyrier, 1981.
