= Georges Chaperot =

French screenwriter (1902–1970)

- Born: 21 April 1902; Brest, France
- Died: 16 July 1970; Montargis, France
- Occupation: Screenwriter

Georges Chaperot (21 April 1902 – 16 July 1970) was a French screenwriter who co-wrote the story of the film A Cage of Nightingales (1945) with René Wheeler, for which they both received an Academy Award nomination in 1947. Their story would later serve as an inspiration for the hugely successful film The Chorus (2004).

== Selected filmography ==
- Moutonnet (1936)
- The Innocent (1938)
- Paid Holidays (1938)
- The Murdered Model (1948)
