= Room 13 (1942 film) =

1942 film

- Directed by: André Hugon
- Written by: André Hugon; Lucien Jaquelux
- Produced by: André Hugon
- Starring: Jules Berry; Josseline Gaël; Robert Le Vigan
- Cinematography: Willy Faktorovitch
- Music by: Vincent Scotto
- Production company: Productions André Hugon
- Distributed by: Cinéma de France
- Release date: 31 January 1942
- Running time: 75 minutes
- Country: France
- Language: French

Room 13 (French: Chambre 13) is a 1942 French crime film directed by André Hugon and starring Jules Berry, Josseline Gaël and Robert Le Vigan. Production began in 1940 but its release was delayed. It was shot at the Marseille Studios of Marcel Pagnol.

== Cast ==
- Jules Berry as Totor
- Josseline Gaël as Geneviève d'Antibes
- Milly Mathis as La baronne
- Simone Barillier as Le jeune première
- Juliette Petit as La chanteuse des rues
- Gaby Fontaine as La script
- Robert Le Vigan as Fenouil
- Rivers Cadet as Le régisseur
- Fransined as Douillard
- Paul Bouton as Michou
- Vallée Valdy as Le baron
- Lucien Callamand as L'auteur
- Georges Grey as Jean
- René Novan as Le patron de l'hôtel
- Jean Daurand as Le chasseur
- Cidalle as Le portier
- Jacques Daroy as Le commanditaire

== Bibliography ==
- Oscherwitz, Dayna & Higgins, MaryEllen. The A to Z of French Cinema. Scarecrow Press, 2009.
- Rège, Philippe. Encyclopedia of French Film Directors, Volume 1. Scarecrow Press, 2009.
- Siclier, Jacques. La France de Pétain et son cinéma. H. Veyrier, 1981.
