= Julietta (film) =

- Poster
- Directed by: Marc Allégret
- Written by: Louise de Vilmorin (novel); Françoise Giroud
- Produced by: Pierre Braunberger
- Starring: Dany Robin; Jean Marais; Jeanne Moreau
- Cinematography: Henri Alekan
- Edited by: Suzanne de Troeye
- Music by: Guy Bernard
- Production companies: Panthéon Productions; Arca Films
- Distributed by: Columbia Films S.A.
- Release date: 22 November 1953
- Running time: 99 minutes
- Country: France
- Language: French
- Box office: 2,178,371 admissions (France)

Julietta is a 1953 French romantic comedy film directed by Marc Allégret and starring Dany Robin, Jean Marais and Jeanne Moreau. The film was based on a novel of Louise de Vilmorin. In United Kingdom the film was known under the title "Julieta" (Mexico), "Biljett till Paris" (Sweden), "Il peccato di Giulietta" (Italy), "Ștrengărița" (Romania). It was shot at the Billancourt Studios with sets designed by the art director Jean d'Eaubonne.

== Cast ==
- Dany Robin as Juliette Valendor
- Jean Marais as André Landrecourt, avocat
- Jeanne Moreau as Rosie Facibey, girlfriend of André
- Denise Grey as Mme Valendor, mother
- Bernard Lancret as prince Hector of Alpen
- Nicole Berger as Martine Valendor, sister of Juliet
- Georges Chamarat as Arthur, l'intendant
- François Joux as Le commissaire
- Georges Sauval as Le contrôleur
- Louis Saintève as L'homme sortant des toilettes du train
- Alain Terrane
- Renée Barell

== Production ==
The film was important in the career of Roger Vadim. His mentor Marc Allegret was directing with Jean Marais to star. Vadim says a week before filming Marais refused to do the movie as he was unhappy with the script. Vadim rewrote the script to the star's satisfaction. The movie was a big success. Vadim and Allegret tried to have Vadim's wife Brigitte Bardot cast as the female lead but the producer went with the better known Dany Robin. However this led to Vadim being given the job of rewriting Naughty Girl which turned Bardot into a star.

== Bibliography ==
- Judith Thissen & Clemens Zimmerman. Cinema Beyond the City. Bloomsbury Publishing, 2017.
