= The Innocent (1938 film) =

1938 film

- Directed by: Maurice Cammage
- Written by: Georges Chaperot; Noël-Noël; René Wheeler
- Produced by: Eugène Reyssier; Laurent Thorpe
- Starring: Noël-Noël; Madeleine Robinson; Henri Nassiet
- Cinematography: Willy Faktorovitch; Jean-Paul Goreaud
- Edited by: André Versein
- Music by: Jean Delettre; Wal-Berg
- Production company: Films Chantecler
- Distributed by: Mondial Films
- Release date: 25 January 1938
- Running time: 80 minutes
- Country: France
- Language: French

The Innocent (French: L'innocent) is a 1938 French comedy drama film directed by Maurice Cammage and starring Noël-Noël, Madeleine Robinson and Henri Nassiet. It was entered into the 1938 1938 Venice Film Festival. The film's sets were designed by the art directors Lucien Jaquelux and Marcel Magniez.

== Cast ==
- Noël-Noël as Nicolas
- Madeleine Robinson as Lisette
- Henri Nassiet as Gregor
- Mady Berry as L'épicière
- Paul Amiot as Delmas - un policier
- Fréhel as Albertine
- René Génin as Un gendarme
- Georges Jamin as As de Coeur
- Maurice Nasil as Mario
- Robert Sidonac as Un gendarme
- Nina Sinclair as L'indicatrice
- Jean-Pierre Thisse as Le petit claude
- Jacques Varennes as Le docteur
- Monique Viard as La petite Monique

== Bibliography ==
- Bessy, Maurice & Chirat, Raymond. Histoire du cinéma français: 1935-1939. Pygmalion, 1986.
- Crisp, Colin. Genre, Myth and Convention in the French Cinema, 1929-1939. Indiana University Press, 2002.
- Rège, Philippe. Encyclopedia of French Film Directors, Volume 1. Scarecrow Press, 2009.
