= The Lucky Star (1943 film) =

1943 film

- Directed by: Jean Boyer
- Written by: Jacques Chabannes; Jean Manse; Thyde Monnier
- Produced by: Jean Jeannin
- Starring: Fernandel; Janine Darcey; René Génin
- Cinematography: Paul Cotteret
- Edited by: Mireille Bessette
- Music by: Roger Dumas
- Production company: Optimax Films
- Distributed by: Les Films Minerva
- Release date: 24 March 1943
- Running time: 90 minutes
- Country: France
- Language: French

The Lucky Star (French: La bonne étoile) is a 1943 French comedy film directed by Jean Boyer and starring Fernandel, Janine Darcey and René Génin. It was shot at the Boulogne Studios in Paris during the German Occupation. The film's sets were designed by the art directors Jacques Dumesnil and Robert Dumesnil.

== Synopsis ==
Auguste, a simple fisherman from Provence, is secretly in love with Mireille the niece of one of his neighbours. She is friendly towards him, but has eyes only for Maurice, a wealthy fishmonger's son from Marseille who seduces and then abandons her. Not aware of this, she confides to Auguste who travels to Marseille in order to try and track him down.

== Cast ==
- Fernandel as Auguste
- Janine Darcey as Mireille
- Andrex as Maurice Carissol
- René Génin as Le curé Agnel
- Henri Arius as Pétavin
- Clairette Oddera as Zize
- Gérard Boyer as Bicou
- Charles Blavette as Le pêcheur
- Marguerite Chabert as La marchande de poissons
- Alice Rosielle as Pompon
- Ginette Bergier as Lydia
- Maurice Salabert as Le portier
- Frédéric Mariotti as Le patron du bistrot
- Édouard Delmont as Baptistin
- Julien Carette as Le parisien

== Bibliography ==
- Burch, Noël & Sellier, Geneviève. The Battle of the Sexes in French Cinema, 1930–1956. Duke University Press, 2013.
- Siclier, Jacques. La France de Pétain et son cinéma. H. Veyrier, 1981.
