= Nicole Berger =

French actress (1934–1967)

Nicole Berger (born Nicole Gouspeyre, 12 June 1934 – 13 April 1967) was a French actress.

== Biography ==
Berger was born Nicole Gouspeyre on 12 June 1934 in Paris. She had a brief theatrical career, particularly in the Compagnie Barrault-Renaud, before starring in feature films. Claude Autant-Lara gave her her first actual opportunity in 1954, offering her one of the three leading roles in Le Blé en herbe. She went on to perform on film from 1956 to 1963, then had a two-year gap during which she only appeared in one full-length film. She then turned to television, playing the protagonist of the leading soap Cecilia.

== Death ==
Berger died of injuries six days after a vehicular accident in Eure when she was thrown from a car that she was driving. Her passenger, French singer and actress Dany Dauberson, survived but never fully recovered emotionally or physically from the crash, which ended her career as a singer. Berger's tomb is in the Père-Lachaise Cemetery in the 20th arrondissement of Paris.

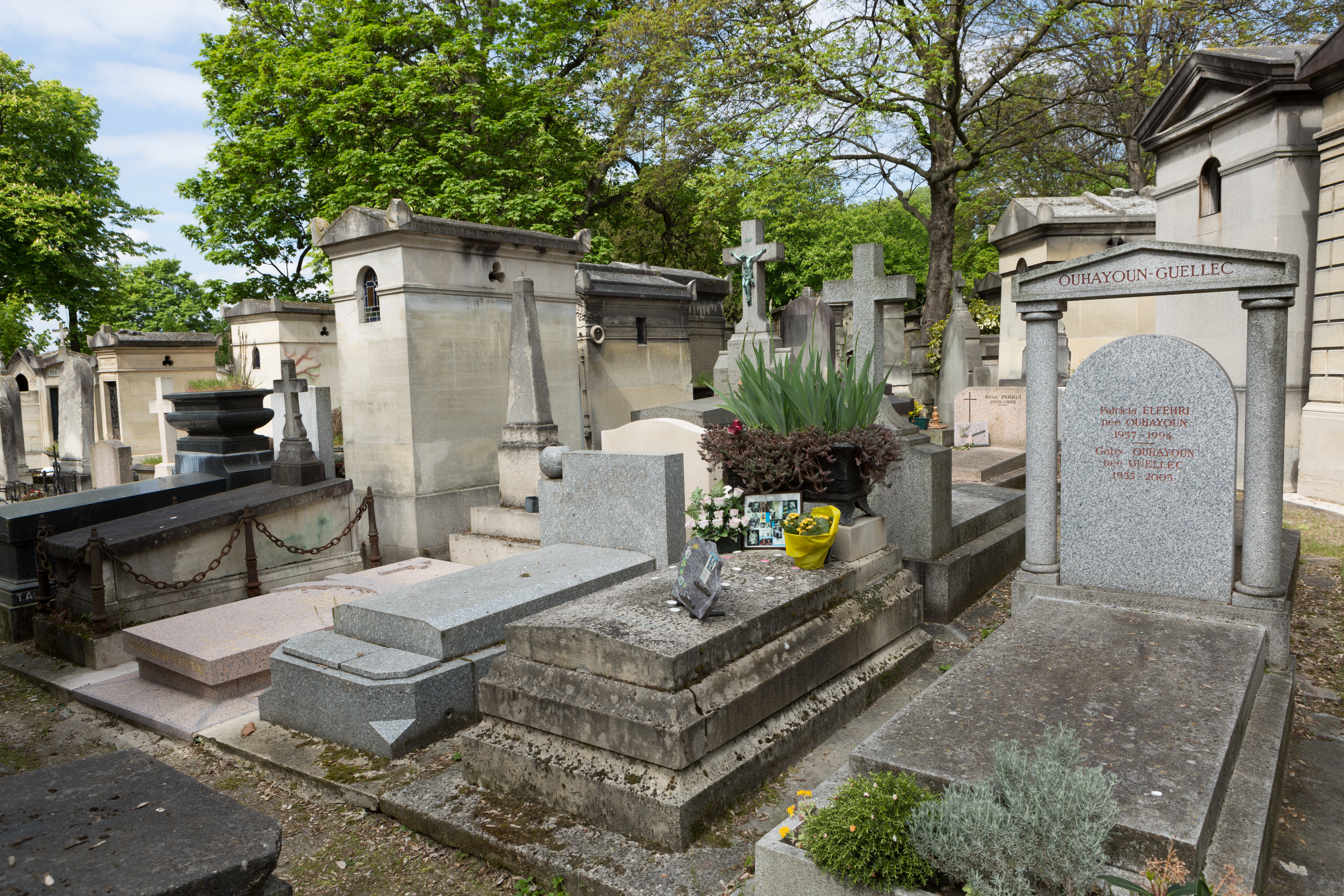
Tomb at the Père-Lachaise Cemetery

== Partial filmography ==
- 1952: Jocelyn (by Jacques de Casembroot) - Julie, la soeur de Jocelyn
- 1953: Julietta (by Marc Allégret) - Martine Valendor
- 1954: Le Blé en herbe (by Claude Autant-Lara) - Vinca
- 1955: Spring, Autumn and Love (by Gilles Grangier) - Cécilia
- 1956: The Girl from Flanders (by Helmut Käutner) - Angeline Meunier / Engele
- 1956: Les Indiscrètes (by Raoul André) - Elisabeth Langeac
- 1956: Les Aventures de Till L'Espiègle (by Joris Ivens and Gérard Philipe) - Nèle
- 1957: He Who Must Die (by Jules Dassin) - Mariori
- 1957: Spring of Life (by Arne Mattsson) - Elisa Fernandez
- 1958: First of May (Le Père et l'Enfant) (by Luis Saslavsky) - Annie Chapois
- 1958: Girls of the Night (by Maurice Cloche) - Néda
- 1958: En cas de malheur (by Claude Autant-Lara) - Janine - la bonne d'Yvette
- 1958: Véronique et son cancre (Short, by Eric Rohmer) - Véronique
- 1959: Les Dragueurs (by Jean-Pierre Mocky) - Françoise
- 1959: All the Boys Are Called Patrick (Short, by Jean-Luc Godard) - Véronique
- 1959: The Restless and the Damned (by Yves Allégret) - Claire Rancourt
- 1960: The Siege of Sidney Street (The Siege of Hell Street) (by Robert S. Baker and Monty Berman) - Sara
- 1960: Tirez sur le pianiste (by François Truffaut) - Thérèse Saroyan
- 1961: The Seven Deadly Sins (by various directors) - (segment "Luxure, La") (uncredited)
- 1962: La Dénonciation (by Jacques Doniol-Valcroze) - Eléonore Germain
- 1963: La Machine à parler d'amour (Short, by Sébastien Japrisot) - La jeune fille
- 1963: Chair de poule (by Julien Duvivier) - Simone
- 1963: À propos d'un meurtre (Short, by Christian Ledieu)
- 1964: Douchka (Short, by Marco de Gastyne) - Récitante / Narrator (voice)
- 1965: Mademoiselle de la Ferte (TV Movie, called "drama" at the time, soap) - Diana
- 1966: Cécilia, médecin de campagne (TV Series) - Cécilia Beaudouin
- 1968: The Story of a Three-Day Pass (by Melvin Van Peebles) - Miriam (final film role)

== Theatre ==
- 1959 : La Folie by and directed by Louis Ducreux, Théâtre de la Madeleine
