= Barnabé (film) =

1938 film

- Directed by: Alexander Esway
- Written by: Jean Aurenche; Alin Monjardin; Paul Nivoix
- Based on: Dix-neuf ans by Jean Bastia
- Produced by: Ayres d'Aguiar
- Starring: Fernandel; Marguerite Moreno; Andrex
- Cinematography: Charles Bauer; Maurice Pecqueux; Gérard Perrin; Marius Raichi
- Edited by: André Versein
- Music by: Roger Dumas; Casimir Oberfeld
- Production company: Gray-Film
- Distributed by: Mondial Films
- Release date: 14 May 1938
- Running time: 95 minutes
- Country: France
- Language: French

Barnabé is a 1938 French comedy film directed by Alexander Esway and starring Fernandel, Marguerite Moreno and Andrex. It was shot at the Billancourt Studios in Paris. The film's sets were designed by the art directors André Barsacq and Pierre Schild. It was based on an operetta by Jean Bastia.

== Synopsis ==
Barnabé, a young flautist, arrives at the house of Madame Petit-Durand to perform for the birthday of her daughter. However, he is mistaken by Madame for the Count de Marengo who she plans for her daughter to marry. Barnabé is himself really in love with the gamekeeper's daughter.

== Cast ==
- Fernandel as Barnabé
- Marguerite Moreno as La marquise de Marengo
- Andrex as André Dubreuil
- Lucien Callamand as Ricavel
- Germaine Charley as Madame Petit-Durand
- Charles Dechamps as Adhemar
- Arthur Devère
- Paulette Dubost as Rose
- Louis Florencie
- Josseline Gaël as Mado
- Claude May as Jackie Petit-Durand
- Max Rogerys
- Noël Roquevert as Hilaire, Le garde-chasse
- Roland Toutain as Paul de Marengo
- Jean Témerson as Firmin
- Victor Vina

== Bibliography ==
- Oscherwitz, Dayna & Higgins, MaryEllen. The A to Z of French Cinema. Scarecrow Press, 2009.
