= Moutonnet =

- Directed by: René Sti
- Written by: Georges Chaperot; Noël-Noël; Jacques Prévert; René Sti
- Starring: Noël-Noël; Lucien Rozenberg; Michel Simon
- Cinematography: Jean Bachelet; André Dantan
- Edited by: Pierre Méguérian
- Music by: Jean Féline; Paul Misraki; Noël-Noël; Ray Ventura
- Release date: 10 July 1936
- Running time: 95 minutes
- Country: France
- Language: French

Moutonnet is a 1936 French comedy film directed by René Sti and starring Noël-Noël, Lucien Rozenberg and Michel Simon.

== Cast ==
- Noël-Noël as Moutonnet et Mérac
- Lucien Rozenberg as Dumonthal
- Michel Simon as Frècheville
- Janine Crispin as Élise
- Suzy Prim as Dolly
- Aline Debray as L'amie d'Élise
- Paul Azaïs as Le garçon d'étage
- Rodolphe Marcilly as L'esthète prétentieux
- Léon Arvel
- Nina Bertin
- Jacques B. Brunius
- Marcel Carpentier
- Eddy Debray
- Jean Deiss
- Allain Dhurtal
- Marcel Duhamel
- Louis Florencie
- Anthony Gildès
- Paul Gury
- Claire Gérard
- Marcel Lupovici
- Albert Malbert
- Gaston Mauger
- Marcel Melrac
- Georges Montel
- Georges Paulais
- Émile Saint-Ober
- René Wheeler

== Bibliography ==
- Crisp, Colin. Genre, Myth and Convention in the French Cinema, 1929-1939. Indiana University Press, 2002.
