= A Man of Gold =

1934 film

- Directed by: Jean Dréville
- Written by: Jean Dréville; Roger Ferdinand
- Produced by: Fred D'Orengiani
- Starring: Harry Baur; Suzy Vernon; Josseline Gaël
- Cinematography: Léonce-Henri Burel
- Edited by: Andrée Danis
- Music by: Henri Forterre
- Production companies: A.V. Films; Les Films Roger Ferdinand
- Distributed by: Cinédis
- Release date: 9 November 1934
- Running time: 90 minutes
- Country: France
- Language: French

A Man of Gold or A Man and His Wife (French: Un homme en or) is a 1934 French drama film directed by Jean Dréville and starring Harry Baur, Suzy Vernon and Josseline Gaël. The film's sets were designed by the art director Robert Hubert.

== Synopsis ==
Bored with life with her civil servant husband, his wife leaves him for a fling with another man. However, he subsequently becomes rich.

== Cast ==
- Harry Baur as Papon
- Suzy Vernon as Janette
- Guy Derlan as Roland Hardi
- Josseline Gaël as Marcelle
- Pierre Larquey as Moineau
- Christiane Dor as Berthe
- Robert Clermont as du Pecq
- Jacques Maury as Jacques

== Bibliography ==
- Goble, Alan. The Complete Index to Literary Sources in Film. Walter de Gruyter, 1999.
