= Christiane Delyne =

French actress

The portrait of Christiane Delyne

Christiane Delyne (3 September 1902 – 17 April 1966) was an American-born French actress.

Delyne was born in Philadelphia, Pennsylvania, as Evelyn Meyer and died in Paris in 1966.

Delyne began her career on the Paris musical stage, creating roles in the operettas La Mariée en vadrouille (1922), L'Amour Benjamin (1923), Jean-Jean (1924) and Agnès et son chat (1925), before turning to film in the early 1930s. In June 1929 she left Paris for South America.

== Selected filmography ==
- Luck (1931)
- A Father Without Knowing It (1932)
- He Is Charming (1932)
- Cognasse (1932)
- The Ironmaster (1933)
- High and Low (1933)
- Paprika (1933)
- I Have an Idea (1934)
- The Guardian Angel (1934)
- Arlette and Her Fathers (1934)
- Les gaietés du palace (1936)
- A Hen on a Wall (1936)
- Sacré Léonce (1936)
- Cinderella (1937)
- The Lady from Vittel (1937)
- The House Opposite (1937)
- Paid Holidays (1938)
- The World Will Tremble (1939)
