= Louis Cuny =

French film director (1902–1962)

- Born: 24 November 1902; Montreuil-sous-Bois (Seine
- Died: 24 July 1962 (aged 59); Cannes (Alpes-Maritimes)
- Occupations: film director, screenwriter and film producer, production designer film editor

Louis Cuny (24 November 1902 – 24 July 1962) was a French film director, screenwriter, film producer, production designer, and film editor.

== Filmography ==
- 1936 : La Voie triomphale (SF)
- 1936 : Le Lycée Papillon (SF)
- 1938 : Le Violon (SF)
- 1939 : Au jardin de la France (SF)
- 1942 : Matin de France (SF)
- 1943 : Hommage à Georges Bizet (SF)
- 1943 : L’Arlésienne (SF)
- 1943 : La Musique à travers les âges (SF)
- 1943 : Mermoz. Music by Arthur Honegger.
- 1945 : Rouen, martyre d'une cité (SF)
- 1945 : Croisière extra muros (SF)
- 1945 : Panorama musical (SF)
- 1946 : Maman de secours (SF)
- 1946 : Strange Fate
- 1947 : Si j'avais la chance (SF)
- 1947 : The Woman in Red
- 1947 : Le Beau Voyage
- 1949 : Il faut qu'une porte soit ouverte ou fermée (SF)
- 1949 : Tous les deux
- 1951 : Tomorrow We Get Divorced
- 1952 : Feather in the Wind
- 1957 : Bonjour Toubib
- 1958 : Gentleman cambrioleur, best short film at San Sebastián International Film Festival in 1958
- 1959 : Symphonie pour un homme seul (SF)
- 1959 : Les Amoureux de la Seine (SF)
- 1959 : Ciné ballets de Paris (Documentary film)
- 1961 : Magic Coiffeur (SF)
