= René Génin =

French actor (1890–1967)

- Born: 25 January 1890; Aix-en-Provence, France
- Died: 24 October 1967 (aged 77); Paris, France
- Occupation: Actor
- Years active: 1931–1965

René Génin (25 January 1890 – 24 October 1967) was a French stage and film actor. He appeared in more than 130 films between 1931 and 1965.

== Selected filmography ==
- Vertigo (1935)
- The Mutiny of the Elsinore (1936)
- The Brighton Twins (1936)
- 27 Rue de la Paix (1936)
- Nights of Fire (1937)
- The Red Dancer (1937)
- Life Dances On (1937)
- Francis the First (1937)
- The Man from Nowhere (1937)
- Port of Shadows (1938)
- The Innocent (1938)
- Ernest the Rebel (1938)
- A Foolish Maiden (1938)
- Ramuntcho (1938)
- Girls in Distress (1939)
- The Phantom Carriage (1939)
- The Master Valet (1941)
- Mademoiselle Swing (1942)
- The Newspaper Falls at Five O'Clock (1942)
- Return to Happiness (1942)
- Fever (1942)
- The Law of Spring (1942)
- Patricia (1942)
- The Lucky Star (1943)
- Pierre and Jean (1943)
- The Ménard Collection (1944)
- A Cage of Nightingales (1945)
- The Eleventh Hour Guest (1945)
- Pamela (1945)
- Majestic Hotel Cellars (1945)
- The Last Penny (1946)
- The Sea Rose (1946)
- Jericho (1946)
- The Lost Village (1947)
- The Lovers of Pont Saint Jean (1947)
- The Beautiful Trip (1947)
- The Farm of Seven Sins (1949)
- The Lovers Of Verona (1949)
- The Passenger (1949)
- God Needs Men (1950)
- The Atomic Monsieur Placido (1950)
- Blonde (1950)
- The Treasure of Cantenac (1950)
- Savage Triangle (1951)
- Piédalu in Paris (1951)
- Village Feud (1951)
- The Billionaire Tramp (1951)
- The Lovers of Bras-Mort (1951)
- Le Sabre de mon père (1951)
- Monsieur Octave (1951)
- Juliette, or Key of Dreams (1951)
- Full House (1952)
- A Mother's Secret (1952)
- The Baker of Valorgue (1953)
- When Do You Commit Suicide? (1953)
- Forbidden Fruit (1952)
- The Sheep Has Five Legs (1954)
- Cadet Rousselle (1954)
- Paris, Palace Hotel (1956)
- The Law Is the Law (1958)
- Croesus (1960)
- Cocagne (1961)
