= Sébastien Callamand =

French footballer (born 1985)

Personal information
- Full name: Sébastien Callamand
- Date of birth: 26 June 1985 (age 41)
- Place of birth: Bourg-en-Bresse, France
- Height: 1.86 m (6 ft 1 in)
- Position: Goalkeeper

Team information
- Current team: PVFC Oyonnax
- Number: 1

Senior career*
Years	Team	Apps	(Gls)
2005–2020	Bourg-Péronnas	206	(0)
2020–	PVFC Oyonnax	1	(0)
- * Club domestic league appearances and goals as of 12:25, 9 October 2020 (UTC)

Sébastien Callamand (born 26 June 1985) is a French professional footballer who plays as a goalkeeper for PVFC Oyonnax, after having played for 15 years for Bourg-Péronnas.
