= Georges Chamarat =

French actor (1901–1982)

- Born: 30 March 1901; Paris, France
- Died: 21 November 1982 (aged 81); Paris, France
- Occupation: Actor
- Years active: 1929–1981

Georges Chamarat (30 March 1901 – 21 November 1982) was a French actor. He appeared in more than 100 films and television shows between 1929 and 1981. He starred in the film The Adventures of Arsène Lupin, which was entered into the 7th Berlin International Film Festival.

== Partial filmography ==
- President Haudecoeur (1940)
- Sins of Youth (1941)
- Annette and the Blonde Woman (1942)
- La Main du diable (1943)
- Pierre and Jean (1943)
- Adrien (1943)
- Late Love (1943)
- Majestic Hotel Cellars (1945)
- Her Final Role (1946)
- The Seventh Door (1947)
- Farewell Mister Grock (1950)
- Murders (1950)
- Dirty Hands (1951)
- Bluebeard (1951)
- Two Pennies Worth of Violets (1951)
- Young Love (1951)
- Adorables créatures (1952)
- Desperate Decision (1952)
- An Artist with Ladies (1952)
- It Is Midnight, Doctor Schweitzer (1952)
- Julietta (1953)
- The Lovers of Marianne (1953)
- The Baker of Valorgue (1953)
- The Sheep Has Five Legs (1954)
- Wild Fruit (1954)
- Quay of Blondes (1954)
- Mam'zelle Nitouche (1954)
- Spring, Autumn and Love (1955)
- Madelon (1955)
- Blackmail (1955)
- It Happened in Aden (1956)
- Fernandel the Dressmaker (1956)
- Paris, Palace Hotel (1956)
- The Wages of Sin (1956)
- Mannequins of Paris (1956)
- Élisa (1957)
- The Wheel (1957)
- Sénéchal the Magnificent (1957)
- The Adventures of Arsène Lupin (1957)
- Le Miroir à deux faces (1958)
- First of May (1958)
- Thérèse Étienne (1958)
- The Big Chief (1959)
- The Mysteries of Paris (1962)
- All Mad About Him (1967)
