= Lucien Rozenberg =

French actor, theatre director, playwright and film director

Rozenberg in 1925

Lucien Rozenberg (11 June 1874 – 1 November 1947) was a French actor, theatre director, playwright and film director. He was principally known as a stage performer, but during the First World War he starred in a series of short comedy films, and in the 1930s returned to the screen in films by, among others, Abel Gance.

During his stage career Rozenberg played in a wide range of plays from verse tragedy by Catulle Mendes to farce by Georges Feydeau to melodrama by Somerset Maugham. In addition to starring in Parisian theatres he appeared in the French provinces, and during the 1920s was seen in twenty plays during a long tour of South America.

During the Second World War Rozenberg had to hide from the Germans during their occupation of Paris; his plans to re-establish himself after the war were unrealised.

== Life and career ==
=== Early years ===
As one of the Three Musketeers, 1900

Rozenberg was born in the 4th arrondissement of Paris on 11 June 1874, the son of Levis Rozenberg and his wife Florence, née Levy. He began his theatrical career towards the end of the 19th century. In 1899 he appeared in the farce La Mariée du Touring-Club by Tristan Bernard at the Théâtre de l'Athénée. In 1902 he was a member of the company headed by Jean Coquelin in Paul Anthelme's Nos deux consciences at the Théâtre de la Porte Saint-Martin. In addition to acting he was an occasional playwright: in 1903 he was co-author of a farce, Tonton presented at the Théâtre du Palais-Royal, and in 1909 Alexandre Germain starred in Rozenberg's one-act comedy, Le Pavé de l'ours.

Between those two productions Rozenberg appeared at the Théâtre de la Gaîté in Coquelin's production of Scarron by Catulle Mendès, and at the Théâtre des Nouveautés in La Petite Madame Dubois by Paul Gavault and Irrésistible by Auguste Germain.

In April 1907 Rozenberg appeared at the Bouffes-Parisiens as Chaumette in Papillon. At the Variétés in February 1910 he played Mareuil in Le Rubicon. He returned to the Bouffes-Parisiens in March 1910 as Le Breautiere in Pierre Mortier's Le jeune homme candide. He was then appointed Directeur de la scène at the Théâtre Michel, and appeared there in 1912 in Georges Feydeau's On purge bébé! and Jean Kolb and André de Fouquières' Le Tiers Porteur. In 1913 he appeared in "Les honneurs de la guerre" by Maurice Hennequin.

At the Athénée in 1914 Rozenberg played the central role of Saint-Franquet in Feydeau's Je ne trompe pas mon mari!, and reprised the role in the same theatre in 1916. During the First World War he began a series of short film comedies, in which he starred and sometimes directed.

=== 1918−1947 ===
Rozenberg was appointed director of the Athénée in 1918, and appeared there in September 1919 as Marcel Lirois in Amour! quand tu nous tiens. During 1920 he toured France in La Belle Aventure and Le Retour, and in 1921 he toured in South America, with a repertory of 20 plays. (Note: The plays were Amour! quand tu nous tiens, Le retour, Poliche, Cabotins, L'air de Paris, Les demi-vierges, Le petit café, La dame de chambre, La 8e femme de Barbe-bleue, Tanis une marraine, Le secret, Monsieur Beverley, Oiseau de rapine, Un homme en habit, La belle aventures, Le danseur de madame, Le couché de la mariée, Copains, Le chauffeur and Une faible femme.) After returning to Paris he played Fougerol in Le Paradis Ferme at the Athénée in November 1921. In June 1923 he married the actress Madeleine Soria. Among his appearances during the rest of the 1920s were at the Athénée in Romance by Robert de Flers (1923), La Rose de septembre by Jacques Deval (1926) and La Lettre, an adaptation of a story by W. Somerset Maugham (1929). In Félix Gandéra's comedy Il manquet un homme (Athénée, 1929) he played an exiled Russian aristocrat reduced to working as a cabaret singer in Paris ("Rozenberg as the Russian prince singing the balalaika is delicious", said one critic).

Although remaining mostly a stage performer, in the 1930s Rozenberg appeared in six films, including René Sti's Moutonnet, and Abel Gance's Un grand amour de Beethoven. His stage appearances of the 1930s included Signor Bracoli by Deval (Nouveautés, 1932), L'Affaire de la rue Royale by Max Maurey (Athénée, 1932), Cette nuit la ... by Lajos Zilahy (Madeleine, 1933, as director and actor), Monsieur Beverley by Georges Berr (Madeleine, 1936) and 3 hommes sur un cheval by Jean de Létraz (Madeleine, 1936 as director and actor).

During the German occupation of Paris during the Second World War, Rozenberg was hunted by the Gestapo and was forced to live in difficult and sometimes dangerous circumstances. The Germans plundered his collection of art, which contained pieces of great value. After the war he planned to take the direction of the Comédie-Caumartin to mount a revue, but the project fell through.

Rozenberg died at Neuilly-sur-Seine on 1 November 1947, aged 73.

== Notes, references and sources ==
=== Sources ===
- Parker, John, ed. (1922). Who's Who in the Theatre (fourth ed.). London: Sir Isaac Pitman and Sons. OCLC 473894893.
