= Willy Faktorovitch =

French cinematographer (1889–1960)

- Born: 3 October 1888; Kiev, Russian Empire
- Died: 9 May 1960 (aged 71); Paris, France
- Occupation: Cinematographer
- Years active: 1918-1982 (film)

Willy Faktorovitch (1888–1960) was a cinematographer. There is some doubt over the year and place of his birth, possibly in Ukraine which was then part of the Russian Empire. He spent his entire career working in the French film industry.

== Selected filmography ==
- Mandrin (1924)
- Le Bossu (1925)
- Destiny (1927)
- Yasmina (1927)
- In the Shadow of the Harem (1928)
- The Sweetness of Loving (1930)
- The Champion Cook (1932)
- In the Land of the Sun (1934)
- The Pont-Biquet Family (1935)
- Marinella (1936)
- César (1936)
- School for Journalists (1936)
- A Hen on a Wall (1936)
- Claudine at School (1937)
- Heartbeat (1938)
- The Innocent (1938)
- The City of Lights (1938)
- Prince Bouboule (1939)
- Grandfather (1939)
- Sing Anyway (1940)
- Cristobal's Gold (1940)
- Paris-New York (1940)
- Room 13 (1942)
- A Dog's Life (1943)
- Rooster Heart (1946)
- Are You Sure? (1947)
- Memories Are Not for Sale (1948)
- The Pretty Miller Girl (1949)
- The White Adventure (1952)
- Manon of the Spring (1952)
- In the Manner of Sherlock Holmes (1956)
- Happy Arenas (1958)
- A Strange Kind of Colonel (1968)

== Bibliography ==
- Jacobs, Diane. Christmas in July: The Life and Art of Preston Sturges. University of California Press, 1992.
