= All the Boys Are Called Patrick =

1957 film

All Boys Are Called Patrick
- Directed by: Jean-Luc Godard
- Written by: Éric Rohmer
- Produced by: Pierre Braunberger
- Starring: Nicole Berger; Anne Collette; Jean-Claude Brialy
- Cinematography: Michel Latouche
- Edited by: Cécile Decugis (uncredited)
- Music by: Ludwig van Beethoven (uncredited)
- Production company: Les Films de la Pléiade
- Distributed by: Janus Films
- Release date: 1957
- Running time: 20 minutes
- Country: France
- Language: French

All the Boys Are Called Patrick (French: Charlotte et Véronique ou Tous les garçons s'appellent Patrick) is a 1957 French short film written by Éric Rohmer and directed by Jean-Luc Godard. It was made before both filmmakers achieved fame as French New Wave filmmakers.

== Plot ==
A talkative womanizer named Patrick inadvertently pursues two young women on the same day who happen to be roommates.

== Cast ==
- Nicole Berger as Véronique
- Anne Collette as Charlotte
- Jean-Claude Brialy as Patrick

== DVD release ==
The film can be found on the Criterion Collection DVD for Godard's Une femme est une femme (1961).
