= Andrex (actor) =

French actor (1907–1989)

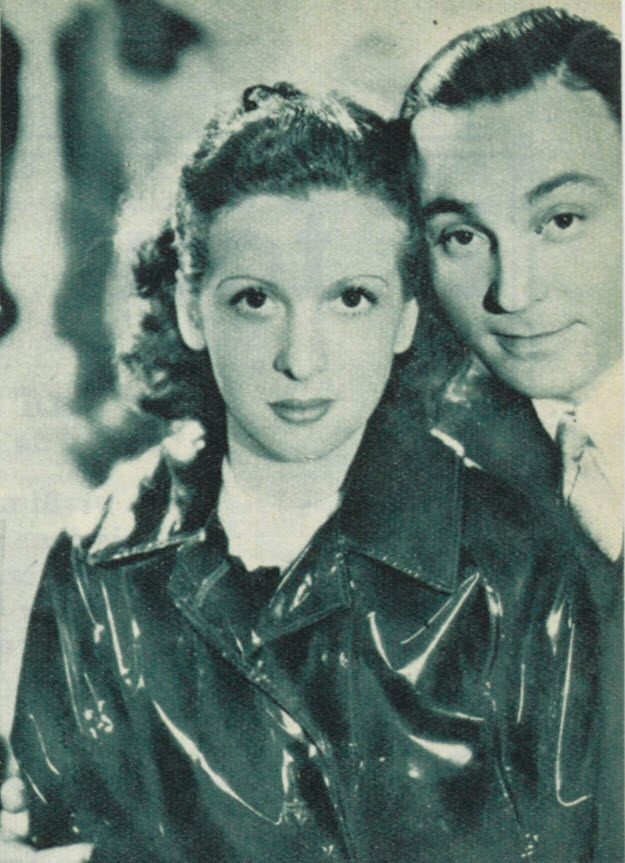
- Gaby Sylvia and Andrex in the movie Behind the Facade, 1939
- Born: 23 January 1907; Marseille, France
- Died: 9 July 1989 (aged 82); Paris, France
- Other name: André Jaubert
- Occupation: Actor
- Years active: 1931–1983 (film)

Andrex (1907–1989), born André Alexis Jaubert was a French film actor. Andrex was a close friend of the comedian Fernandel and appeared in many films alongside him.

He was married to the actress Ginette Baudin.

== Partial filmography ==
- Toine (1932)
- Le coq du régiment (1933)
- Les Bleus de la marine (1934) − Le lieutenant
- Angèle (1934) − Louis
- Toni (1935) − Gabi
- Ferdinand le noceur (1935) − Un client du bordel (uncredited)
- La brigade en jupons (1936)
- Josette (1937) − Lucien
- Les dégourdis de la 11ème (1937) − Le sergent
- Ignace (1937) − Serge de Montroc
- Life Dances On (1937) − Paul
- Gribouille (1937) − Robert
- L'affaire du courrier de Lyon (1937) − L'avocat de Lesurques
- La Marseillaise (1938) − Honoré Arnaud
- The Strange Monsieur Victor (1938) − Robert Cerani
- Barnabé (1938) − André Dubreuil
- Paid Holidays (1938) − Gangster #1
- The Tamer (1938) − Bertrand
- Hôtel du Nord (1938) − Kenel
- Les gangsters du château d'If (1939) − Bimbo
- The Five Cents of Lavarede (1939) − Jim Strong
- Behind the Facade (1939) − André Laurent, l'employé de banque
- Nightclub Hostess (1939) − Marcel
- Fric−Frac (1939) − Petit−Louis
- Extenuating Circumstances (1939) − Môme de Dieu (Kid of God)
- Une idée à l'eau (1940) − Le deuxième scénariste
- Parade en sept nuits (1941) − Tonin − le séducteur
- The Suitors Club (1941) − Maxime
- The Italian Straw Hat (1941) − Achille de Rosalba
- Simplet (1942) − Rascasse
- Les petits riens (1942) − Mesnard
- A Woman in the Night (1943) − Le charbonnier
- The Lucky Star (1943) − Maurice Carissol
- Mistral (1943) − Charles
- Madly in Love (1943) − Ulysse
- Madame et son flirt (1946) − Gérard Sauvaget
- The Woman in Red (1947) − Le chef des gangsters
- The Three Cousins (1947) − Claude
- Manon (1949) − Le trafiquant
- The Heroic Monsieur Boniface (1949) − Charlie
- Uniformes et grandes manoeuvres (1950) − André Duroc
- The Sleepwalker (1951) − Charlie, le chef des gangsters
- Adhémar (1951) − Tisalé
- Village Feud (1951) − Frédéric Gari
- The Sheep Has Five Legs (1954) − Un marin
- Spring, Autumn and Love (1955) − Blancard
- Four Days in Paris (1955) − Le brigadier
- If Paris Were Told to Us (1956) − Paulus
- If All the Guys in the World (1956) − Le docteur Lagarrigue
- Les promesses dangereuses (1956)
- The Virtuous Bigamist (1956) − Frédéric
- Honoré de Marseille (1956) − Pastèque
- Vacances explosives! (1957) − Joe Ravello dit Monsieur Jo
- Paris clandestin (1957) − Max
- C'est arrivé à 36 chandelles (1957) − Andrex (uncredited)
- La p... sentimentale (1958) − Tony − le souteneur
- Interpol Against X (1960) − Mathias
- Cocagne (1961) − Amedee
- Magnet of Doom (1963) − M. Andrei
- Monsieur (1964) − Antoine
- L'Âge ingrat (1964) − Le camionneur (uncredited)
- Your Money or Your Life (1966) − Le chef de convoi
- La honte de la famille (1969) − Etouvant
- Charles and Lucie (1979) − Le patron du bar 'Quand même' (uncredited)
- Cap Canaille (1983) − Pascal Andreucci

== Bibliography ==
- Andrew, Dudley. Mists of Regret: Culture and Sensibility in Classic French Film. Princeton University Press, 1995.
