= Julienne Paroli =

French actress (1882–1959)

- Born: 1 August 1882; Saint-Étienne, France
- Died: 26 September 1959 (aged 77); Paris, France
- Occupation: Actress
- Years active: 1931–1958 (film)

Julienne Paroli (1 August 1882 – 26 September 1959) was a French film actress.

== Selected filmography ==
- Montmartre (1931) - Mme Esther (uncredited)
- Women's Club (1936) - La mère à la gare
- Belle étoile (1938) - (uncredited)
- Three Waltzes (1938) - La mère d'une danseuse (uncredited)
- Grandfather (1939) - Pauline
- Personal Column (1939) - La vieille bonne (uncredited)
- Sins of Youth (1941) - La couturière
- Caprices (1942) - La concierge
- The Blue Veil (1942) - La concierge (uncredited)
- Huit hommes dans un château (1942) - (uncredited)
- Vingt-cinq ans de bonheur (1943) - L'hôtelière
- Shop Girls of Paris (1943) - Une boutiquière (uncredited)
- The Stairs Without End (1943) - Madame Pinchard
- Goodbye Leonard (1943) - (uncredited)
- Love Story (1943) - La vieille Thérèse
- Traveling Light (1944) - La vieille fille
- Cecile Is Dead (1944) - La femme de ménage (uncredited)
- The Ménard Collection (1944) - Un amie de la veuve Ménard
- La vie de plaisir (1944) - La comtesse de Merly (uncredited)
- The Great Pack (1945) - Sylvie
- Majestic Hotel Cellars (1945) - Madame Marcelle, employée aux cuisines (uncredited)
- François Villon (1945) - La mère
- Jericho (1946) - La cliente à la pharmacie (uncredited)
- Land Without Stars (1946) - La grand-mère (uncredited)
- Strange Fate (1946)
- A Lover's Return (1946) - La bonne (uncredited)
- La femme en rouge (1947) - La femme de chambre
- The Lost Village (1947) - Mme Chardon (uncredited)
- La dame d'onze heures (1948) - Une commère (uncredited)
- Tabusse (1949) - La Noémie
- Rendezvous in July (1949) - Minor Role (uncredited)
- Miquette (1950) - Une commère (uncredited)
- Le crime des justes (1950) - La vieille
- A Certain Mister (1950) - La bigote
- On n'aime qu'une fois (1950) - La grand-mère
- ...Sans laisser d'adresse (1951) - Une concierge (uncredited)
- Darling Caroline (1951) - La voisine de la nourrice (uncredited)
- Avalanche (1951) - Mme Coutet
- Deux sous de violettes (1951) - (uncredited)
- The Seven Deadly Sins (1952) - La dame des vestiaires (segment "Orgueil, L' / Pride") (uncredited)
- Monsieur Leguignon Lampiste (1952) - La vieille habitante du quartier (uncredited)
- Le Blé en herbe (1954) - La grand-mère (uncredited)
- La bella Otero (1954) - La bonne de Martel
- Le pain vivant (1955) - La grand-mère
- Les chiffonniers d'Emmaüs (1955) - La bourgeoise (uncredited)
- Le Secret de sœur Angèle (1956) - Une soeur
- Blood to the Head (1956) - Madame Cardinaud - mère
- It's All Adam's Fault (1958)
- Les Misérables (1958) - Madame Magloire
- Le temps des oeufs durs (1958) - La tante de Raoul
- Love Is My Profession (1958) - Mme Blondel - la bijoutière (uncredited) (final film role)

== Bibliography ==
- Buache, Freddy. Claude Autant-Lara. L'AGE D'HOMME, 1982.
