= Véronique et son cancre =

- Directed by: Éric Rohmer
- Written by: Éric Rohmer
- Produced by: Claude Chabrol
- Starring: Nicole Berger; Stella Dassas; Alain Delrieu
- Cinematography: Charles L. Bitsch
- Edited by: Jacques Gaillard
- Release date: 1958
- Running time: 18 minutes
- Language: French

Véronique et son cancre (Veronique and Her Dunce) is a short comedy film by Éric Rohmer, which he directed before his series of Six Moral Tales (Contes moraux). It records the meeting of a young woman called Véronique with a difficult boy she has been hired to tutor. The encounter raises questions about the value in later life of the teaching used in schools and about the treatment of children who are either unwilling or genuinely unable to learn.

== Plot ==
Véronique arrives to give Jean-Christophe extra tutoring at his apartment. The boy is not enthusiastic, treating her disrespectfully and answering almost every question with an irritating "dunno". In arithmetic, it is doubtful if he is grasping the principles, but he throws her off balance with some confounding questions. She also has to keep slipping off her new shoes (which she has bought in order to look smart) because they are too tight. When it comes to composition, Jean-Christophe seems to lack imagination, but again makes some sharp observations. Both tutor and pupil are glad when the session ends.

== Cast ==
- Nicole Berger as Véronique
- Stella Dassas as Jean-Christophe's mother
- Alain Delrieu as Jean-Christophe
