= Georges Péclet =

French actor, director, and screenwriter

- Born: Prosper Désiré Péclet; 27 July 1897; La Brillanne, France
- Died: 11 January 1974 (aged 76); Marseille, France
- Other name: Georges Peclet
- Occupations: Actor; Director; Screenwriter
- Years active: 1919–1963

Prosper Désiré "Georges" Péclet (27 July 1897 – 11 January 1974) was a French actor, director, and screenwriter.

== Career ==
Between 1919 and 1957, Péclet played in ninety-five films (including several short films). He was an assistant director in 1927 and then eventually began directing in 1928.

He was a director of ten films in total, the last one being from 1963. He was also the writer of five of these movies and producer of one. Péclet is sometimes credited simply by his name, occasionally spelled without the accent: "Peclet".

== Selected filmography ==
- The Man with the Hispano (1926)
- The Martyrdom of Saint Maxence (1928)
- Napoleon at Saint Helena (1929)
- The Mystery of the Villa Rose (1930)
- The Train of Suicides (1931)
- Moon Over Morocco (1931)
- The Regiment's Champion (1932)
- The Five Accursed Gentlemen (1932)
- Imperial Violets (1932)
- The Last Night (1934)
- Princess Tam Tam (1935)
- Wedding Night (1935)
- 27 Rue de la Paix (1936)
- Three Days Leave (1936)
- The King (1936)
- Temptation (1936)
- The Men Without Names (1937)
- Heroes of the Marne (1938)
- Peace on the Rhine (1938)
- Chéri-Bibi (1938)
- Cristobal's Gold (1940)
- Narcisse (1940)
- The Suitors Club (1941)
- Melody for You (1942)
- Love Marriage (1942)
- The Midnight Sun (1943)
- Mistral (1943)
- Le Grand Cirque (1950)
- Casabianca (1951)
