= René Wheeler =

French screenwriter and film director

- Born: 8 February 1912; France
- Died: 11 December 2000 (aged 88); France
- Occupations: Screenwriter, film director

René Wheeler (8 February 1912 - 11 December 2000) was a French screenwriter and film director. He co-wrote the story of the film A Cage of Nightingales (1945) with Georges Chaperot, for which they both received an Academy Award nomination in 1947. Their story would later serve as an inspiration for the hugely successful film The Chorus (2004). Wheeler also co-wrote the screenplay for the 1955 heist film Rififi.

== Selected filmography ==
- Moutonnet (1936)
- The Innocent (1938)
- The Duraton Family (1939)
- Night Warning (1946)
- The Faceless Enemy (1946)
- Danger of Death (1947)
- Something to Sing About (1947)
- The Lovers of Pont Saint Jean (1947)
- The Loves of Colette (1948)
- The Winner's Circle (1950)
- The Happy Man (1950)
- The Most Beautiful Girl in the World (1951)
- Twelve Hours of Happiness (1952)
- Feather in the Wind (1952)
- The Love of a Woman (1953)
- Double or Quits (1953)
- Rififi (1955)
- Forgive Us Our Trespasses (1956)
- The Restless and the Damned (1959)
- A Woman in White (1965)
