= Maurice Cammage =

French film director and dialoguist

Maurice Cammage is a French film director and dialoguist, born in 1882 and died on 15 April 1946 in Paris.

== Filmography ==
- 1932 : Vive la classe
- 1932 : Un beau jour de noces
- 1932 : La Terreur de la pampa (script and dialogues by José de Bérys)
- 1932 : Quand tu nous tiens, amour
- 1932 : Par habitude
- 1932 : Ordonnance malgré lui
- 1933 : Le Gros Lot or La Veine d'Anatole
- 1933 : Le Coq du régiment
- 1934 : Une nuit de folies
- 1934 : La Caserne en folie
- 1934 : Les Bleus de la marine
- 1935 : Un soir de bombe
- 1935 : La Mariée du régiment
- 1936 : La Petite Dame du wagon-lit
- 1936 : Les Maris de ma femme
- 1937 : Une femme qui se partage
- 1937 : Mon député et sa femme
- 1937 : The Beauty of Montparnasse
- 1938 : The Innocent
- 1938 : Paid Holidays
- 1938 : Une de la cavalerie
- 1939 : The Five Cents of Lavarede
- 1939 : The Porter from Maxim's
- 1940 : Monsieur Hector
- 1941 : The Italian Straw Hat
- 1942 : Guignol marionnette de France (short film)
- 1943 : A Dog's Life
- 1946 : The Faceless Enemy
