= Claude Nollier =

French actress (1919–2009)

Claude Nollier (born Yvette Emilie Maria Louise Nollier), French actress, was born on 12 December 1919 in Paris, and died 12 February 2009 in Boulogne-Billancourt.

== Biography ==
A theatre actress, she joined the Comédie Française in 1946 to 1951. She began a modest cinematic career during the 1940s. She most notably worked with André Cayatte, John Huston and Sacha Guitry. She is best known for playing the role of Joan of Arc on a number of occasions for the Opéra de Paris, in Jeanne au bûcher, by Paul Claudel and Arthur Honegger.

== Selected filmography ==
Cinema

- 1944 : La Vie de plaisir by Albert Valentin
- 1946 : Mensonges by Jean Stelli
- 1950 : Justice est faite by André Cayatte
- 1951 : Dirty Hands by Fernand Rivers
- 1952 : Le Fruit défendu by Henri Verneuil
- 1952 : Moulin Rouge by John Huston
- 1954 : Si Versailles m'était conté by Sacha Guitry
- 1956 : Si Paris nous était conté by Sacha Guitry
- 1957 : Pot-Bouille by Julien Duvivier
- 1961 : The Greengage Summer by Lewis Gilbert
- 1962 : Le Diable et les dix commandements by Julien Duvivier

Television

- 1959 : Les Trois Mousquetaires by Claude Barma

== Theatre ==
- 1961 : Andromaque by Racine, directed by Raymond Gérôme, Bellac Festival
