= Lucien Callamand =

French actor (1888–1968)

- Born: Lucien Marie Pascal Eugène Callamand; 1 April 1888; Marseille
- Died: 3 December 1968 (aged 80); Nice, Alpes-Maritimes
- Occupation: Actor
- Years active: 1909–1965

Lucien Callamand born Lucien Marie Pascal Eugène Callamand (1 April 1888 in Marseille – 3 December 1968 in Nice, Alpes-Maritimes) was one of the earliest French film actors whose career spanned six decades of French cinema. Between 1909 and 1965, he starred in at least 115 films.

== Selected silent films ==
- Ma femme veut conduire (1914)
- Le Roman d'un spahi Le (1914)
- Narcisse a perdu son oncle (1913)
- Agénor et la main qui vole (1912)
- Agénor le bien-aimé (1912)
- Ma concierge est trop jolie (1912) (as Paul Lack)
- Agénor, cavalier de deuxième classe (1911)
- L'Envieuse (1911)
- Le Pain des petits oiseaux (1911)
- Un monsieur qui a un tic (1911)
- L'Assommoir (1909)
- La Jeunesse de Vidocq ou Comment on devient policier (1909)

== Selected sound filmography ==
- Un trou dans le mur (1930)
- Marius (1931)
- Le capitaine Craddock (1931)
- Ronny (1931)
- Nuits de Venise (1931)
- Les vacances du diable (1931)
- Stupéfiants (1932)
- Vous serez ma femme (1932)
- La belle aventure (1932)
- L'Or dans la rue (1934)
- Le Roi des Champs-Élysées (1934)
- Mam'zelle Spahi (1934)
- On a volé un homme (1934)
- Divine (1935)
- Count Obligado (1935)
- Happy Arenas (1935)
- Counsel for Romance (1936)
- The Great Refrain (1936)
- When Midnight Strikes (1936)
- On the Road (1936)
- The Kiss of Fire (1937)
- In Venice, One Night (1937)
- Barnabé (1938)
- Gargousse (1938)
- The Acrobat (1941)
- The Italian Straw Hat (1941)
- Promise to a Stranger (1942)
- Melody for You (1942)
- Room 13 (1942)
- The Murderer is Afraid at Night (1942)
- The Mysteries of Paris (1943)
- Two Timid Souls (1943)
- The Marriage of Ramuntcho (1947)
- The Sharks of Gibraltar (1947)
- Rumours (1947)
- The Tragic Dolmen (1948)
- The Dancer of Marrakesh (1949)
- Millionaires for One Day (1949)
- 56 Rue Pigalle (1949)
- The King (1949)
- Passion for Life (1949)
- The Wreck (1949)
- Dominique (1950)
- The Patron (1950)
- The Adventurers of the Air (1950)
- The Lady from Boston (1951)
- Bouquet of Joy (1951)
- The Convict (1951)
- Fanfan la Tulipe (1952)
- A Girl on the Road (1952)
- Dans la vie tout s'arrange (1952)
- Je l'ai été trois fois (1952)
- My Husband Is Marvelous (1952)
- The Lovers of Marianne (1953)
- Napoleon Road (1953)
- L'Étrange Désir de monsieur Bard (1954)
- Stopover in Orly (1955)
- The Case of Doctor Laurent (1957)
- Fugitive in Saigon (1957)
- Toi, le venin (1959)
- Twelve Hours By the Clock (1959)
