= Sardou =

Sardou is a surname, and may refer to:

- Saint Sacerdos of Limoges, also known as Saint Sardou
- Victorien Sardou, French dramatist

- Victorien Sardou was also the basis for naming Eggs Sardou, which is a part of Creole cuisine.

- Fernand Sardou (1910–1976), French singer and actor, father of Michel
  - Michel Sardou, French singer
    - Davy Sardou (born 1978), French actor, son of Michel
    - Romain Sardou, French novelist
- Jackie Sardou, née Rollin (1919–1998), French actress, wife of Fernand
- Joseph-Marie Sardou (1922–2009), French Catholic archbishop
