= Saint-Romain =

Saint-Romain may refer to:

== Places ==
=== Canada ===
- Saint-Romain, Quebec

=== France ===
- Saint-Romain, Charente
- Saint-Romain, Côte-d'Or
- Saint-Romain, former commune of the Dordogne department, now part of Saint-Romain-et-Saint-Clément
- Saint-Romain, former commune of the Lot department, now part of Gourdon
- Saint-Romain, Puy-de-Dôme
- Saint-Romain, former commune of the Haute-Savoie department, now part of Reignier
- Saint-Romain, Vienne, in the Vienne department
- Saint-Romain-au-Mont-d'Or, in the Rhône department
- Saint-Romain-d'Ay, in the Ardèche department
- Saint-Romain-de-Benet, in the Charente-Maritime department
- Saint-Romain-de-Colbosc, in the Seine-Maritime department
- Saint-Romain-de-Jalionas, in the Isère department
- Saint-Romain-de-Lerps, in the Ardèche department
- Saint-Romain-de-Monpazier, in the Dordogne department
- Saint-Romain-de-Popey, in the Rhône department
- Saint-Romain-de-Surieu, in the Isère department
- Saint-Romain-d'Urfé, in the Loire department
- Saint-Romain-en-Gal, in the Rhône department
- Saint-Romain-en-Gier, in the Rhône department
- Saint-Romain-en-Jarez, in the Loire department
- Saint-Romain-en-Viennois, in the Vaucluse department
- Saint-Romain-et-Saint-Clément, in the Dordogne department
- Saint-Romain-Lachalm, in the Haute-Loire department
- Saint-Romain-la-Motte, in the Loire department
- Saint-Romain-la-Virvée, in the Gironde department
- Saint-Romain-le-Noble, in the Lot-et-Garonne department
- Saint-Romain-le-Preux, in the Yonne department
- Saint-Romain-le-Puy, in the Loire department
- Saint-Romain-les-Atheux, in the Loire department
- Saint-Romain-sous-Gourdon, in the Saône-et-Loire department
- Saint-Romain-sous-Versigny, in the Saône-et-Loire department
- Saint-Romain-sur-Cher, in the Loir-et-Cher department
- Saint-Romain-sur-Gironde, in the Charente-Maritime department

== Other uses ==
- Saint-Romain wine, from the Saint-Romain commune in Côte-d'Or
- Saint Romanus (disambiguation), a number of Catholic saints

== See also ==
- Romain (disambiguation)
- Romaine (disambiguation)
