= Davy Sardou =

French actor (born 1978)

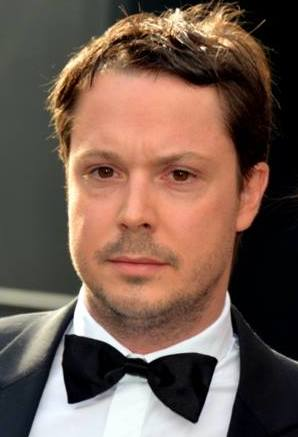
- Born: 1 June 1978 (age 47); Boulogne-Billancourt, France
- Occupation: Actor
- Years active: 1998-present
- Spouse: Noémie Elbaz (m. 2011; div. 2018)
- Children: 1
- Father: Michel Sardou
- Relatives: Romain Sardou (brother); Fernand Sardou (grandfather); Jackie Sardou (grandmother)

Davy Sardou (born 1 June 1978) is a French actor. He is the son of singer Michel Sardou, the grandson of actors Jackie Sardou and Fernand Sardou, and the brother of French novelist Romain Sardou.

Sardou studied acting at the Lee Strasberg Institute in New York, starred in several off-Broadway plays before returning to Paris in 2001.

Sardou was nominated for a Molière (the French equivalent of the Tony Awards) in 2011 for his role in "Le Nombril". and won the Molière for "Best supporting actor" in 2014 for his role in "L'affrontement".

== Theater ==
- 2018: La Collection by Harold Pinter, directed by Thierry Harcourt, théâtre de Paris
- 2017: Hôtel des deux mondes, by Eric-Emmanuel Schmitt, directed by Anne Bourgeois, Théâtre Rive Gauche
- 2016: Le Plus beau jour by David Foenkinos, directed by Anne Bourgeois, Théâtre Hébertot
- 2015: Les voeux du coeur by Bill C. Davis, directed by Anne Bourgeois, Théâtre La Bruyère
- 2014: Georges et Georges by Eric-Emmanuel Schmitt, directed by Steve Suissa, Théâtre Rive Gauche
- 2014: Sacha Guitry et son double by Pierre Tré-Hardy, directed by Steve Suissa, Festival de Grignan
- 2013 - 2014: L'affrontement by Bill C; Davis directed by Steve Suissa with Francis Huster at the Théâtre Rive Gauche
- 2012: L'alouette by Jean Anouilh directed by Christophe Lidon with Sara Giraudeau at the Théâtre Montparnasse
- 2011: A Midsummer Night's Dream by William Shakespeare, directed by Nicolas Briançon, with Mélanie Doutey and Lorant Deutsch, at the Anjou Theater Festival.
- 2011: Le Nombril by Jean Anouilh directed by Michel Fagadau, with Francis Perrin, Francine Bergé, Eric Laugérias and Jean-Paul Bordes, at the Comédie des Champs-Élysées.
- 2010: Léocadia, by Jean Anouilh directed by Thierry Harcourt with Geneviève Casile and Noémie Elbaz at the Theater 14.
- 2009: Happy Birthday, directed by Thierry Harcourt with Nicole Calfan, Henri Courseaux, Yves Pignot, Éric Boucher, Nathalie Roussel, Julie Victor, Jean-Paul Delvor, Noémie Elbaz and Nicolas Briançon for the 60th Festival d'Anjou.
- 2008-2009: Family Secret by Éric Assous, directed by Jean-Luc Moreau, with Michel Sardou, Laurent Spielvogel, Mathilde Penin, Elisa Servier and Rita Brantalou, at Théâtre des Variétés and on tour.
- 2008: Oscar by Claude Magnier, directed by Philippe Hersen, at the Théâtre du Gymnase Marie Bell with Bernard Farcy and Chantal Ladesou.
- 2006-2007: Arsenic and Old Lace by Joseph Kesselring, directed by Thierry Harcourt, with Micheline Dax, Jacqueline Danno, Théâtre de la Tête d’Or in Lyon and on tour.
- 2004-2005: Copy/Paste by Jean-Marie Chevret, directed by Jean-Pierre Dravel et Olivier Macé, with Christian Vadim, Gabrielle Lazure, at the Théâtre Michel
- 2001-2002: Man in question by Félicien Marceau, directed by Jean-Luc Tardieu, with Michel Sardou, Brigitte Fossey, André Badin, Louison Roblin, Alain Cerrer, Melodie Berenfeld, Anne-Elodie Sorlin and Gilbert Pascal at the Théâtre de la Porte Saint-Martin and on tour.
- 2001: The House of Correction by Norman Lock, directed by George Loros, with Nunzio Caponio, at the Marilyn Monroe Theater.
- 2000: Seasons at the Ensemble Theater.
- 2000: Closer by Patrick Marber, directed by Davy Sardou, at the Adbington Theater in New York
- 1999: Three Sisters by Anton Tchekov, directed by George Loros, at the Pantheon Theater in New York
- 1998: Creditors by August Strindberg, directed by Robert Castle, at the Sanford Meisner Theater in New York

== Film and television ==
- 2013: Victor Young Perez directed by Jacques Ouaniche
- 2012: R.I.S, police scientifique directed by Alain Brunard
- 2012: Section de recherches directed by Gérard Marx
- 2011: Le déclin de l'empire masculin directed by Angelo Cianci
- 2010: Bienvenue à Bouchon directed by Luc Béraud, with Francis Perrin, Yvan Le Bolloc'h and Elodie Frenck.
- 2009: Le Roi, l’écureuil et la couleuvre directed by Laurent Heynemann, with Thierry Frémont, Lorànt Deutsch, Sara Giraudeau, Carole Richert and Laurent Natrella.
- 2007: Crédit pour un meurtre directed by Dominique Tabuteau, with Pierre Arditi, Anne Suarez, Marc Citti and Julie Bataille
- 2006: Profils Criminels directed by Laurent Carceles with Shirley Bousquet, Julie Dray and Manuel Gélin
- 2004: Navarro directed by Jean Sagols with Roger Hanin and Alain Doutey
- 2004: Léa Parker directed by Laurent Bregeat with Sonia Rolland.
- 2001: Le Groupe directed by Jean Sagols with Frank Geney, Barbara Cabrita and Géraldine Lapalus.
- 1999: Black and White directed by James Toback, with Scott Caan, Robert Downey Jr., Ben Stiller, Elijah Wood and Jared Leto.
- 1998: Blind Date short film directed by Greg Egan.
- 1998: The Bum short film directed by Greg Egan.
