= Romaine =

Romaine may refer to:

== Places ==
- Romaine, Tasmania, Australia, a suburb of Burnie
- La Romaine, Quebec, Canada, an Indian reserve
- La Romaine, Quebec (unconstituted locality), a small community adjacent to the Indian reserve
- Romaine River, Quebec
- Romaine (Saône), a river in eastern France
- La Romaine, Haute-Saône, a commune in France

== Other uses ==
- Romaine lettuce, a variety of lettuce
- Romaine (name), a list of people and fictional characters with the surname or given name
- Romaine-class frigate, a French Navy class designed in 1794
  - French frigate Romaine (1794), lead ship of the class
- Romaine Complex, a hydroelectric complex on the Romaine River in Quebec, which includes four generating stations
  - Romaine-1 Generating Station
  - Romaine-2 Generating Station
  - Romaine-3 Generating Station

== See also ==
- Romain (disambiguation)
