= Floirac =

Floirac is the name of several communes in France:

- Floirac, Charente-Maritime
- Floirac, Gironde
- Floirac, Lot
- Floirac, former commune of the Aveyron department, now part of Onet-le-Château
