= Romain =

Romain may refer to:

== People ==
=== Given name ===
- Romain Allemand (born 2006), French snowboarder
- Romain Bussine (1830–1899), French poet and voice professor
- Romain Rolland (1866–1944), French writer
- Romain de Tirtoff (1892–1990), French artist and designer known as Erté
- Romain Bellenger (1894–1981), French road racing cyclist
- Romain Gijssels (1907–1978), Belgian professional road bicycle racer
- Romain Maes (1912–1983), Belgian cyclist
- Romain Gary (1914–1980), French novelist, film director, World War II pilot, and diplomat
- Romain Weingarten (1926–2006), French playwright
- Romain Duris (born 1974), French actor
- Romain Sardou (born 1974), successful French novelist
- Romain Barnier (born 1976), freestyle swimmer
- Romain Ferrier (born 1976), French defender
- Romain Larrieu (born 1976), goalkeeper
- Romain Haguenauer (born 1976), French ice dancing coach, choreographer, and former competitor
- Romain Dumas (born 1977), French racing driver
- Romain Pitau (born 1977), French football midfielder
- Romain Barras (born 1980), French decathlete
- Romain Sato (born 1981), Central African basketball player
- Romain Jacuzzi (born 1984), French midfielder
- Romain Feillu (born 1984), French road racing cyclist
- Romain Villa (born 1985), French Cyclist
- Romain Vincelot (born 1985), French defender
- Romain Jouan (born 1985), French professional tennis player
- Romain Danzé (born 1986), French football player
- Romain Grosjean (born 1986), French Formula One driver
- Romain Brégerie (born 1986), French footballer
- Romain Gasmi (born 1987), French footballer
- Romain Genevois (born 1987), Haitian footballer
- Romain Hamouma (born 1987), French footballer
- Romain Hardy (born 1988), professional cyclist
- Romain Virgo (born 1990), Jamaican singer
- Romain Bardet (born 1990), French road racing cyclist
- Romain Arneodo (born 1992), French-born Monegasque tennis player
- Romain Gall (born 1995), American soccer player
- Romain Le Gac (born 1995), French ice dancer
- Romain Del Castillo (born 1996), French footballer
- Romain Ntamack (born 1999), French rugby player
- Romain Forestier (born 1994), French fermentation expert

=== Surname ===
- Dominic Romain, Trinidad and Tobago politician
- Jonathan Romain (born 1954), English writer, broadcaster and rabbi
- Jérôme Romain (born 1971), French track and field athlete
- James Romain (born 1987), American football defensive back

== Places ==
- Romain, Doubs, a commune in the department of Doubs, France
- Romain, Jura, a commune in the department of Jura, France
- Romain, Marne, a commune in the department of Marne, France
- Romain, Meurthe-et-Moselle, a commune in the department of Meurthe-et-Moselle, France

== Other uses ==
- Romain, an alternate name for César, a red wine grape from Burgundy

== See also ==
- Le Romain (disambiguation)
- Romaine (disambiguation)
