= Jean-Claude Hartemann =

French conductor (1929–1993)

Jean-Claude Hartemann (18 December 1929 – 27 November 1993) was a 20th-century French conductor.

== Biography ==
Born in Vezet (Haute-Saône), a student of Jean Fournet at the École Normale de Musique de Paris, Hartemann took part to the 1956 Besançon International Competition. From 1957 to 1960, he was first conductor of the Grand Théâtre lyrique de Dijon, where he met Jésus Etcheverry, with whom he perfected his training. From 1960 to 1963, he was musical director of the Théâtre de Metz, then permanent head of the Réunion des théâtres lyriques nationaux. Regularly invited to the Opéra-Comique, he was its musical director from 1968 to 1972. He founded several ensembles, including the Ensemble instrumental de France in 1966, the Solistes de France in 1971, and the Rencontres lyriques de Luchon in 1988. A talented Mozartian, he recorded several French operettas, Gounod's St. Cecilia Mass, and created works by Franck Martin. From 1972 to 1977 he taught at the Schola Cantorum de Paris, then at the Centre culturel d'Évry. In a context of crisis in orchestral conducting in France, he is one of the very few conductors to have passed on his profession, whose lyrical repertoire was for him the essential basis.

Jean-Claude Hartemann died in Paris in 1993 at age 63.
