= Greucourt =

- Part of La Romaine
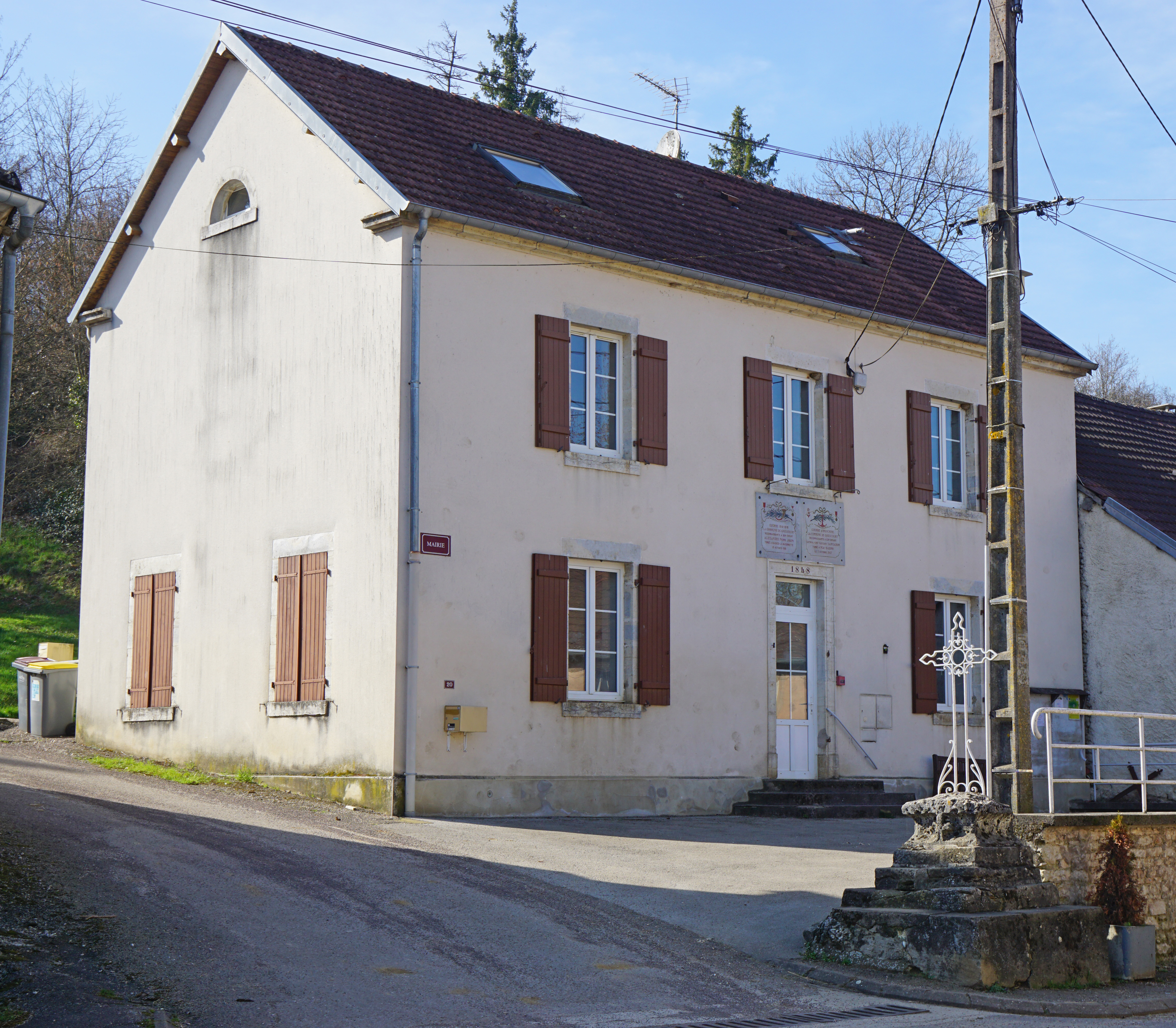
- Town hall
- Location of Greucourt
- Location within France Location within Bourgogne-Franche-Comté
- Coordinates: 47°32′04″N 5°51′48″E
- Country: France
- Region: Bourgogne-Franche-Comté
- Department: Haute-Saône
- Arrondissement: Vesoul
- Canton: Scey-sur-Saône-et-Saint-Albin
- Commune: La Romaine
- Area^{1}: 2.68 km^{2} (1.03 sq mi)
- Highest elevation: 238 m (781 ft)
- Lowest elevation: 207 m (679 ft)
- Population (2022): 78
  - Density: 29/km^{2} (75/sq mi)
- Time zone: UTC+01:00 (CET)
  - Summer (DST): UTC+02:00 (CEST)
- Postal code: 70130
- ^{1} French Land Register data, which excludes lakes, ponds, glaciers > 1 km^{2} (0.386 sq mi or 247 acres) and river estuaries.

Greucourt (French pronunciation: [ɡʁøkuʁ]) is a former commune in the Haute-Saône department in the region of Bourgogne-Franche-Comté in eastern France. On 1 January 2016, it was merged into the new commune La Romaine.

== See also ==
- Communes of the Haute-Saône department
