= La Romaine, Haute-Saône =

La Romaine
- Commune
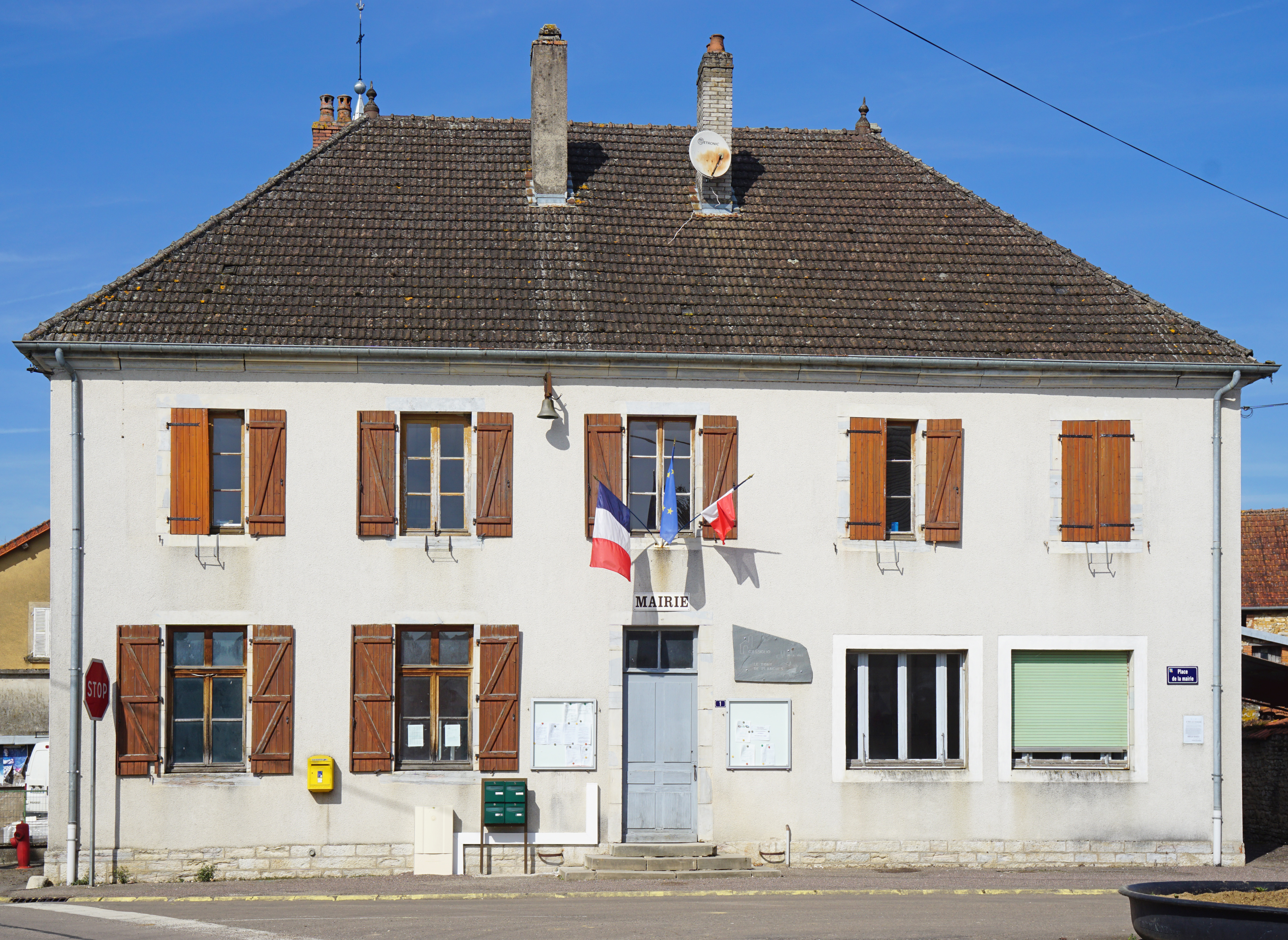
- The town hall in La Romaine
- Location of La Romaine
- Location within France Location within Bourgogne-Franche-Comté
- Coordinates: 47°32′10″N 5°55′16″E
- Country: France
- Region: Bourgogne-Franche-Comté
- Department: Haute-Saône
- Arrondissement: Vesoul
- Canton: Scey-sur-Saône-et-Saint-Albin

Government
  - Mayor (2020–2026): Roger Relange
- Area^{1}: 21.22 km^{2} (8.19 sq mi)
- Population (2023): 520
  - Density: 25/km^{2} (63/sq mi)
- Time zone: UTC+01:00 (CET)
  - Summer (DST): UTC+02:00 (CEST)
- INSEE/Postal code: 70418 /70130
- ^{1} French Land Register data, which excludes lakes, ponds, glaciers > 1 km^{2} (0.386 sq mi or 247 acres) and river estuaries.

La Romaine (French pronunciation: [la ʁɔmɛn], lit. 'The Romaine') is a commune in the Haute-Saône department of eastern France. The municipality was established on 1 January 2016 and consists of the former communes of Le Pont-de-Planches, Greucourt and Vezet.

== See also ==
- Communes of the Haute-Saône department
