= St. Cecilia Mass =

1855 solemn mass in G major by Charles Gounod

- by Charles Gounod
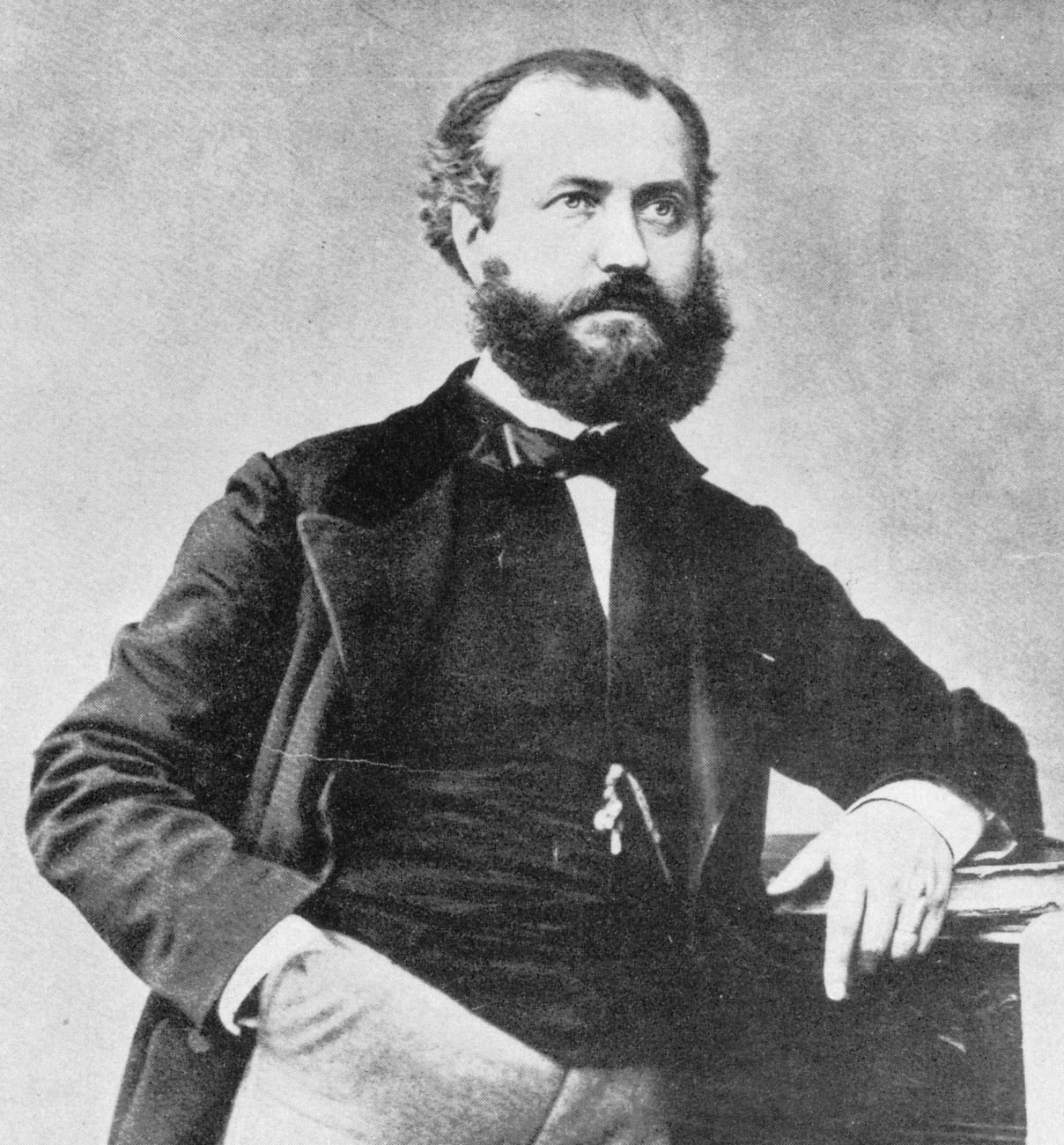
- The composer, 1859
- Native name: Messe solennelle en l’honneur de Sainte-Cécile
- Catalogue: CG 56
- Form: Mass
- Text: Order of Mass
- Language: Latin
- Performed: 22 November 1855 Saint-Eustache, Paris
- Movements: 8
- Vocal: SATTBB choir; solo: soprano, tenor and bass
- Instrumental: orchestra; organ

St. Cecilia Mass is the common name of a solemn mass in G major by Charles Gounod, composed in 1855 and scored for three soloists, mixed choir, orchestra and organ. The official name is Messe solennelle en l’honneur de Sainte-Cécile, in homage of St. Cecilia, the patron saint of music. The work was assigned CG 56 in the catalogue of the composer's works.

== History ==
The first work by Gounod performed in public was on 1 May 1841 a mass at the church of San Luigi dei Francesi, Rome. The St. Cecilia Mass was his first major work. Parts of it, the Sanctus and Benedictus, were performed in London on 13 January 1851, together with works such as Mendelssohn's Die erste Walpurgisnacht. Gounod's new music was acclaimed in the press, rendering details and culminating in an enthusiastic summary: "It is ... the work of a thoroughly trained artist – and what is more, the poetry of a new poet". The review was published in Paris and raised expectations. The premiere was performed on St. Cecilia's day, 22 November 1855, in Saint-Eustache, Paris, where it was customary to celebrate the day by the performance of a new mass. The conductor was Théophile Tilmant.

== Text ==
The Order of Mass is slightly extended. In the Gloria, the prayer miserere nobis (have mercy on us) is intensified by an added Domine Jesu (Lord Jesus). The mass has an instrumental offertory. In the Agnus Dei, the soloists sing between the three invocations the text "Domine, non sum dignus ut intres sub tectum meum, sed tantum dic verbo, et sanabitur anima mea" (Lord, I am not worthy to receive you, but only say a word and I shall be healed), sung once by the tenor and again by the soprano. The movement ends with an added Amen. The piece concludes with the text, "Domine, salvum fac Imperatorem nostrum Napoleonum, et exaudi nos in die qua invocaverimus te" (Lord, bless our Emperor Napoleon and hear our prayer this day that we call you), sung once as Prière de l'Eglise (prayer of the church) by the choir a cappella after a short instrumental introduction, the second time as Prière de l'Armée (prayer of the army) by the tenors, basses, and brass, and the third time as Prière de la Nation (prayer of the nation) by the choir with orchestra. The changes have been criticized as not liturgically strict.

== Scoring and structure ==
The vocal parts of the mass are performed by three soloists (soprano, tenor and bass) and a choir of four parts, sometimes with divided tenor and bass. The soloists act mostly as an ensemble, without arias. Gounod scored the mass for a large orchestra, demanding six harps. In Gloria and Sanctus, he highlighted passages by pistons (cornets), typical instruments of the romantic French orchestra. In Benedictus and Agnus Dei, he was the first composer to use the newly developed octobass, a string instrument of the violone family. He included the great organ, mostly in Grand jeu.

In the following table of the movements, the markings, keys and time signatures are taken from the choral score, using the symbol for alla breve (2/2).

No.	Parte	Incipit	Vocal	Marking	Tono	Tempo
I	Kyrie		STBSATB	Moderato, quasi Andantino	G major	common time
II	Gloria	Gloria in excelsis Deo	SSATB	Larghetto	D major	common time
II	Gloria	Et in terra pax	STBSATB	Allegro pomposo	D major	common time
II	Gloria	Domine Fili unigenite	STBSATB	Andante	G major	common time
II	Gloria	Quoniam tu solus sanctus	STBSATB	Allegro, tempo I	D major	common time
III	Credo	Credo in unum Deum	SATB	Moderato molto maestoso	C major	common time
III	Credo	Et incarnatus est	SABSATB	Adagio	C major	common time
III	Credo	Crucifixus	SABSATB	Adagio	G minor	common time
III	Credo	Et resurrexit	SATTBB	Tempo primo	C major	common time
	Offertory			Adagio molto	A♭ major	common time
IV	Sanctus		TSATTBB	Andante	F major	9/8
V	Benedictus		SSATTBB	Adagio	B-flat major	common time
VI	Agnus Dei	Agnus Dei	SATB	Andante moderato	D major	12/8
VI	Agnus Dei	Domine, non sum dignus	T	Andante moderato	D major	12/8
VI	Agnus Dei	Agnus Dei	SATB	Andante moderato	D major	12/8
VI	Agnus Dei	Domine, non sum dignus	S	Andante moderato	D major	12/8
VI	Agnus Dei	Agnus Dei	SATTB	Andante moderato	D major	12/8
VII	Domine salvum fac	Prière de l'Eglise	SATTB	Largo	G major	common time
VII	Domine salvum fac	Prière de l'Armée	TB	Un peu anima. et très un menuré.	G major	common time
VII	Domine salvum fac	Prière de la Nation	SATB	Slower	G major	common time

== Reception ==
Camille Saint-Saens commented after the premiere:

"The appearance of the Messe Saint-Cécile caused a kind of shock. This simplicity, this grandeur, this serene light which rose before the musical world like a breaking dawn, troubled people enormously. … at first one was dazzled, then charmed, then conquered."

He ranked the mass among the best works by Gounod:

"In the faint distant future when inexorable time has completed its work and the operas of Gounod are forever in repose in the dusty sanctuary of libraries, the Messe de Sainte Cécile, the Rédemption and the oratorio Mors et Vita will still retain life."

The Sanctus was used in Werner Herzog's film Nosferatu the Vampyre (1979).

== Selected recordings ==
- Igor Markevitch, Irmgard Seefried, Gerhard Stolze, Hermann Uhde, Tschechischer Sängerchor Prag – Tschechische Philharmonie, recorded in Prague, 1965
- Jean-Claude Hartemann, Pilar Lorengar, Heinz Hoppe, Franz Crass, Orchestre de la Société des Concerts du Conservatoire, recorded in St. Roch before 1963
- Mariss Jansons, Luba Orgonášová, Christian Elsner, Gustáv Beláček, Bavarian Radio Chorus and Radio Symphony Orchestra, recorded live at Herkulessaal, Munich, in 2007

== Sources ==
- Messe solennelle de Sainte-Cécile: Scores at the International Music Score Library Project
- Free scores of St. Cecilia Mass in the Choral Public Domain Library (ChoralWiki)
