= Michel Sardou =

French singer (born 1947)

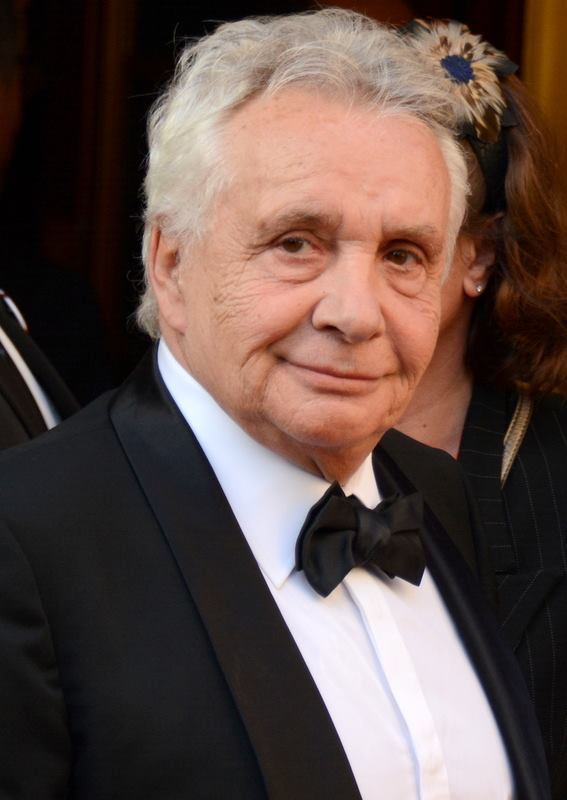

Background information
- Born: Michel Charles Sardou; 26 January 1947 (age 79); Paris, France
- Genres: French popular music
- Occupations: Singer, songwriter, actor
- Years active: 1965–present
- Labels: Barclay, Tréma, Universal
- Website: michelsardou.net

Michel Charles Sardou (French pronunciation: [miʃɛl ʃaʁl saʁdu]; born 26 January 1947) is a French singer and occasional actor.

Sardou is known not only for his love songs ("La maladie d'amour", "Je vais t'aimer"), but also for songs dealing with various social and political issues, such as the rights of women in Islamic countries ("Musulmanes"), clerical celibacy ("Le curé"), colonialism ("Le temps des colonies", "Ils ont le pétrole mais c'est tout") or the death penalty ("Je suis pour"). Another sometimes controversial theme found in some of his songs ("Les Ricains" and "Monsieur le Président de France" for example) is his respect and support for the culture and foreign policies of the United States of America. He has been accused of being a racist due to his 1976 song "Le temps des colonies", in which a former colonial soldier proudly tells his memories of colonialism, but Sardou has always claimed the song was sarcastic. His 1981 single "Les lacs du Connemara" was an international hit (especially in the Netherlands). A number of his hit songs were written in collaboration with Jacques Revaux and Pierre Delanoë, a few others (most notably "En chantant") with Italian singer Toto Cutugno.

Sardou sold out eighteen consecutive dates at Palais Omnisports de Paris-Bercy in 2001, while his 2004 album Du plaisir went straight to the number one spot on the French album charts. With a recording career of fifty years, Sardou has released 25 studio albums, 18 live albums and has recorded more than 350 songs (chiefly in French but also in Spanish, Italian and even English) and has sold more than 100 million records. Currently he is considered one of the most popular artists in the Francophone world and one of the most lucrative, both in sales and in his shows.

== Biography ==
=== Childhood ===
Michel Sardou was born on 26 January 1947 in Paris. His father, Fernand Sardou, was a singer and an actor while his mother, Jackie Sardou was an actress. His paternal grandfather, Valentin Sardou, was a comedian in Marseille, while his grandmother was a singer.

Sardou left school at 16.

=== Career ===
==== The early stages (1965–1970) ====
Sardou began working as a waiter in his father's cabaret in Montmartre. He eventually met Michel Fugain and auditioned for Eddie Barclay. In 1965, Sardou began his recording career with "Le madras", co-written with Michel Fugain and Patrice Laffont.

In 1967, Sardou's career really picked up, thanks to censorship: while France left NATO's integrated military command and the Vietnam War was causing anti-American sentiment in France, Sardou released "Les Ricains" (The Yanks), a song which stated the debt of gratitude towards the US for the liberation of France. Charles de Gaulle did not like the song and he advised against its broadcast on state radio and television. This gave the singer a new notoriety, and the song let him lay the foundations for his future artistic style. However, from 1967 to 1970, he still found it difficult to have big hits.

In view of the mitigated success of Sardou's singles, in 1969, Eddie Barclay decided to terminate his contract, estimating that Sardou was not cut out to be a singer. So, he founded the record label Tréma (which stands for Talar Revaux Éditions Musicales Associées), which would produce his records, with his friends Jacques Revaux (who will become his most loyal composer) and Régis Talar, a French record producer.

==== Success and controversies (1970–1980) ====
Sardou really met true success in 1970, when he released his first studio album, J'habite en France. Three songs extracted from this work became hits : "J'habite en France" ("I Live in France"), "Et mourir de plaisir" ("To die of pleasure") but mainly "Les bals populaires" ("Popular Dances"), which reached the top of the French chart.

From this album, the hits would be uninterrupted throughout the 1970s. The songs "Le rire du sergent" ("The Sergeant's Laugh") (1971), "Le surveillant général" ("The Superintendent") (1972) found favour with the public. But his success was sealed in 1973 with the album La maladie d'amour. Its title track "La maladie d'amour" ("The Lovelorne"), "Les vieux mariés" ("The old married couple", but adapted in English under the title "It's not too late to start again") and "Les villes de solitude" ("Cities of Solitude") would eventually become great successes. However, this last song triggered a controversy as Sardou takes the role of a man who, tired of his monotonous daily routine, drunkenly expresses his brutal fantasies (of robbing a bank and raping women), but never acts on them. The feminist organisation MLF objected.

The controversies reached their peak in 1976, with the album La vieille (The Old Woman). The first single from it, "Le France" ("SS France"), released in November 1975, was a message of indignation addressed to the President of France Valéry Giscard d'Estaing, who had just sold the ocean liner SS France. The controversial song was welcomed by the trade unions and the Communist Party even though Sardou was seen, because of several other songs, as an archetypal reactionary singer. Even after the album was a real triumph (more than a million copies sold), other extracts, like "J'accuse" ("I charge men of...") or "Le temps des colonies" ("Days of Colonialism") are about a singer who defends old conservative values. He was even accused of being a racist and an apologist for colonialism, but he has always insisted that the song is written in character rather than being an expression of his own views. The song "Je suis pour..." ("I am in favour of ...") puts Sardou in the role of a man in favour of the death penalty because his own son has been killed. In the wake of this, and other political positions expressed by him, Anti-Sardou campaigns were started; their demonstrations regularly disrupted the singer's tours, although other left-wingers felt that Sardou was entitled to his freedom of speech.

The next year, in 1977, Sardou moved away from politics. His next album, La java de Broadway, contained famous songs, such as "La java de Broadway" ("Broadway Java"), "Dix ans plus tôt" ("Ten years earlier") and a revival of the Claude François hit "Comme d'habitude" (the tune of which is best known to English-speaking audiences as "My Way"). The album was a huge success, exactly like the next Je vole (1978), which gave him one of his biggest hits, "En chantant" ("Singing"), written together with the Italian singer Toto Cutugno.

==== A legend in motion (1981–2001) ====
The 1980s began under good omens for the singer, with the album Les lacs du Connemara from which came two songs considered important to the entire canon of French popular music: "Les lacs du Connemara" ("The Lakes of Connemara") and "Être une femme" ("Being a woman").

Throughout the decade, Sardou had a lot of success : "Afrique adieu" ("Farewell, Africa") in 1982, "Il était là" ("He was here") in 1982, "Rouge" ("Red") in 1984, "Chanteur de jazz" ("Jazz Singer") in 1985, "La même eau qui coule" ("The same water flowing") in 1988... because his sales did not slow down, whereas a lot of his contemporaries had been forgotten during the disco boom.

However, Sardou did not shy away from controversial songs, and even had success with several of them : "Vladimir Ilitch", in 1983, which both pays tribute to the ideas of Lenin and denounces the drift of the Soviet Union away from them; "Les deux écoles" ("The Two Schools"), in 1984, which recalls the opposition between the free school and the private school with a defence of private schools; "Musulmanes" ("Muslim women"), in 1986, which casts a pessimistic and bitter look at the rights of women in Islamic countries but which also pays a tribute to Arabic culture.

At the end of the 1980s, Sardou received the recognition of his peers by being awarded a Music Victory for "Musulmanes" as the best song of the year.

In the 1990s, the run of hit singles dried up, even if his four albums had very good sales. Sardou chose, for his shows in Paris, the Palais Omnisports de Paris-Bercy in 1989, 1991, 1993, 1998 and 2001, and managed to fill this small stadium for a total of 88 times after his tour in 2001, each time with more than 17,000 spectators. He also holds the record of attendances and performances for this stadium.

Sardou received, in 1990 and in 1999, the Music Victory for the biggest number of spectators gathered at the end of a tour (in 1998, nearly 580,000 people have come to see him on stage.)

After the album Français (2001) and its promotional tour, Sardou announced his retirement from singing.

==== The renewal (2004–2013) ====
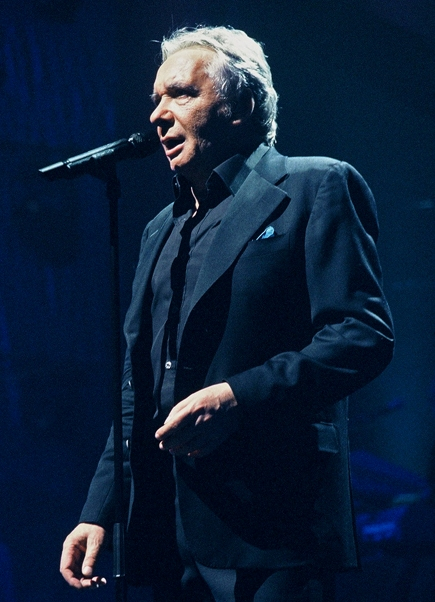
Michel Sardou at the Palais des Sports in 2005.

In 2004, Sardou signed a contract with the record label Universal Music France for a new album entitled Du plaisir, he participated in the French television show Star Academy and he organised an international tour in 2004 and 2005, visiting France, Belgium, Switzerland and Canada.

On 13 November 2006, the double album Hors format was released. This album includes twenty-three new songs, one of which is a duet with Chimène Badi, "Le chant des hommes" ("The Song of Men"). "Hors Format" has reached 400,000 copies sold and is a double platinum. In 2007, he started another tour, visiting venues like the Olympia and the Zénith de Paris. "Le Blues Black Brothers" was released January 1, 2004.

Sardou released the album Être une femme (2010) on 30 August 2010. Tracks include an electronic style remix by the DJ Laurent Wolf of his own 1980s hit "Être une femme", and a duet with Céline Dion, "Voler" ("To Fly"). The subsequent tour met with further success.

Les grands moments (The Great Moments), a compilation album of Sardou's greatest hits, was released 22 October 2012. In 2012 and 2013 Sardou gave a show of the same name, showcasing his material all the way back to the mid-1960s. The show was staged at the Palais Omnisports de Paris-Bercy for three dates in December 2012 and five dates at the Olympia in June 2013. But medical issues forced Sardou to cancel the twelve last dates.

In September 2014, Sardou began playing the lead role in a play written especially for him by Éric-Emmanuel Schmitt, Si on recommençait ? (If we begin again ?).

Several of Sardou's songs also feature prominently in the French comedy film "La famille Bélier", released in 2014.

==== Return to Music, New Tour, and Retirement (2023–2024) ====
In November 2022, Sardou announced that he would return to the stage for a new tour with around thirty dates, exclusively in large venues, mainly Zénith arenas. The tour, titled "Je me souviens d'un adieu" (after his 1995 song), runs from October 3, 2023, at the Zénith in Rouen until March 17, 2024, at the Paris La Défense Arena. 100,000 tickets for the tour sold out in just eight hours.

In September 2023, Sardou released a previously unreleased song, recorded in 1992, titled "En quelle année Georgia," co-written with Didier Barbelivien and composed by Jean-Pierre Bourtayre.

On March 13, 2024, in an interview with Le Parisien, Sardou announced his retirement from the world of music and theater. He also mentioned that he might consider acting in a film directed by Olivier Marchal, should Marchal be interested.

=== Personal life ===
Sardou married Françoise Pettré, a dancer, in 1965. They have two daughters: Sandrine (born on 15 January 1970) and Cynthia (born on 4 December 1973). They divorced in 1977. He married his second wife, Elizabeth Haas, called "Babette", in October 1977. They have two sons: Romain, writer (born on 6 January 1974) and Davy, actor (born on 1 June 1978). They divorced in June 1999. On 11 October 1999, married Anne-Marie Périer, the daughter of the actor François Périer and the sister of the photographer Jean-Marie Périer. She is the former editor-in-chief of Elle magazine. They were married in Neuilly-sur-Seine by then-mayor Nicolas Sarkozy.

== Discography ==
=== Albums ===
| Year | Title | Charts | | | | Certification |
| Year | Title | FRA | BEL (Wa) | NED | SWI | Certification |
|---|---|---|---|---|---|---|
| 1968 | Petit – Les Ricains | 8 | | | | |
| 1970 | J'habite en France | 2 | | | | FRA: Gold |
| 1972 | Danton | 2 | | | | |
| 1973 | La maladie d'amour | 1 | | | | FRA: Gold |
| 1976 | La vieille | 1 | | | | FRA: Gold |
| 1977 | La java de Broadway | 2 | | | | FRA: Gold |
| 1978 | Je vole | 1 | | | | FRA: Gold |
| 1979 | Verdun | 10 | | | | |
| 1980 | Victoria | 18 | | | | |
| 1981 | Les lacs du Connemara | 1 | | | | FRA: Platinum |
| 1982 | Il était là | 2 | | | | |
| 1983 | Vladimir Ilitch | 4 | | | | FRA: Platinum |
| 1984 | Io Domenico | 1 | | | | FRA: Platinum |
| 1985 | Chanteur de jazz | 5 | | | | FRA: Platinum |
| 1987 | Musulmanes | 1 | | | | FRA: Platinum |
| 1988 | Le successeur | 2 | | | | |
| 1989 | Sardou 66 | | | | | |
| 1990 | Le privilège | 2 | | | | FRA: 2× Platinum |
| 1992 | Le bac G | 1 | | | | |
| 1994 | Selon que vous serez, etc., etc. | 1 | | | | FRA: 2× Platinum; SWI: Gold |
| 1997 | Salut | 1 | 1 | | 48 | BEL: Gold; FRA: 2× Platinum |
| 1998 | Les grandes moments | 23 | | | | BEL: Platinum |
| 2000 | Français | 1 | 2 | — | 17 | BEL: Gold; FRA: Platinum |
| 2004 | Du plaisir | 1 | 2 | 62 | 9 | BEL: Gold; FRA: Diamond |
| 2006 | Hors format | 1 | 1 | — | 17 | BEL: Gold; FRA: Platinum |
| 2010 | Être une femme 2010 | 2 | 1 | 45 | 10 | BEL: Platinum; FRA: 3× Platinum |
| 2017 | Le choix du fou | 2 | 1 | — | 6 | BEL: Gold; FRA: 2× Platinum |
| 2021 | En Chantant | 56 | — | — | — | |
| 2023 | Intime | — | 19 | — | — | |
| 2023 | Engagé | 9 | 22 | — | — | |
| 2024 | Je me souviens d'un adieu | — | 1 | — | 24 | |

=== Live albums ===
| Year | Album | Chart positions FRA | Album certifications |
|---|---|---|---|
| 1971 | Olympia 71 | | |
| 1975 | Olympia 75 | 1 | FRA: Gold |
| 1976 | Olympia 76 | 4 | FRA: Gold |
| 1979 | Palais des Congrès 78 | 34 | |
| 1981 | Palais des Congrès 81 | | |
| 1983 | Vivant 83 | 2 | FRA: Gold |
| 1985 | Concert 85 | | FRA: Gold |
| 1987 | Concert 87 | 8 | FRA: Gold |
| 1989 | Bercy 89 | 5 | FRA: Gold |
| 1991 | Bercy 91 | 9 | FRA: 2× Gold |
| 1993 | Bercy 93 | 6 | FRA: 2× Gold |
| 1995 | Olympia 95 | 3 | FRA: 2× Gold |
| 1998 | Bercy 98 | 5 | |
| 2001 | Bercy 2001 | 5 | FRA: Gold |
| 2005 | Live 2005 au Palais des sports | 11 | FRA: Gold |
| 2008 | Zénith 2007 | | |
| 2011 | Confidences et retrouvailles – Live 2011 | 8 | |
| 2013 | Les grands moments – Live 2013 | 23 | |
| 2018 | La dernière danse – Live 2018 à La Seine musicale | 16 | |
| 2021 | Le concert de sa vie | 7 | |

=== Compilation albums ===
- 1980 : 20 chansons d'or
- 1984 : 20 chansons d'or, volume 2
- 1984 : Sardou, ses plus grandes chansons
- 1986 : Sardou, ses plus grandes chansons (volume 2)
- 1988 : Regards
- 1989 : Les Grandes Chansons
- 1989 : Intégrale 1989
- 1993 : Les Années Barclay
- 1994 : Intégrale 1966–1994
- 1995 : Intégrale 1965–1995
- 1996 : Les Grands Moments
- 2000 : Raconte une histoire (original recordings of his first songs with Barclay from 1965 à 1967)
- 2003 : MS
- 2004 : Anthologie
- 2005 : Michel Sardou
- 2007 : L'Intégrale Sardou
- 2007 : Les 100 plus belles chansons
- 2008 : Les 50 plus belles chansons (rerelease)
- 2009 : Les N°1 de Michel Sardou
- 2009 : Master Series
- 2009 : Master Series, volume 2
- 2012 : Les Grands Moments
- 2014 : Michel Sardou – La Collection officielle
- 2017 : Les Géants de la chanson – La Collection officielle
- 2017 : Mes premières et mes dernières danses – Intégrale des enregistrements studio 1965–2012
- 2019 : L'album de sa vie 100 titres

=== Singles and various songs ===
Best known for songs before 1983

- "Le madras"
- "Les Ricains"
- "J'habite en France"
- "Et mourir de plaisir"
- "Les bals populaires"
- "Le rire du sergent"
- "Le surveillant général"
- "La maladie d'amour"
- "Les vieux mariés"
- "Les villes de solitude"
- "le France"
- "J'accuse"
- "Le temps des colonies"
- "Je suis pour..."
- "La java de Broadway"
- "Dix ans plus tôt"
- "En chantant"
- "Comme d'habitude"
- "Je vole"
- "Les lacs du Connemara"
- "Être une femme"
- "Afrique adieu"
- "Il était là"
- "Rouge"
- "Chanteur de jazz"
- "Je vais t'aimer"

Hits after 1983 with chart positions

| Year | Title | Charts | | | | Album |
| Year | Title | FRA | BEL (Wa) | NED Single Top 100 | SWI | Album |
|---|---|---|---|---|---|---|
| 1984 | "Les deux écoles" | 48 | — | — | — | Sardou 1984 |
| 1984 | "Délire d'amour" | 10 | — | — | — | Sardou 1984 |
| 1985 | "Io Domenico" | 17 | — | — | — | Sardou 1984 |
| 1985 | "Les deux écoles" | 7 | — | — | — | Sardou 1985 |
| 1986 | "1986" | 31 | — | — | — | Sardou 1985 |
| 1986 | "Musulmanes" | 5 | — | — | — | Sardou 1986 |
| 1987 | "Tous les bateaux s'envolent" | 8 | — | — | — | Regards |
| 1988 | "La même eau qui coule" | 5 | — | — | — | Sardou 1988 |
| 1989 | "Attention les enfants... danger" | 9 | — | 60 | — | Sardou 1988 |
| 1990 | "Marie-Jeanne" | 2 | — | — | — | Sardou 1990 |
| 1991 | "Le privilège" | 19 | — | — | — | Sardou 1990 |
| 1991 | "Le vétéran" | 35 | — | — | — | Sardou 1990 |
| 1992 | "Le bac G" | 15 | — | — | — | Sardou 1992 |
| 1993 | "Le cinéma d'Audiard" | 45 | — | — | — | Sardou 1992 |
| 2000 | "Cette chanson-là" | 15 | 21 | — | — | Français |
| 2004 | "La rivière de notre enfance" (with Garou) | 1 | 1 | — | 14 | Français |

=== Emblematic songs ===
- "Les bals populaires" ("The Popular Dances"), released in 1970. The song deals with the popular village dance parties which were fashionable in the 1970s.
- "La maladie d'amour" ("The Disease of Love"), released in 1973. It is certainly Michel Sardou's most famous song and stayed at the top of the charts for 11 weeks. Michel drew his inspiration for this song from Pachelbel's Canon. A few bars from the Beatles' "Let It Be" can also be heard in the song.
- "Le France" ("SS France"), released in 1975. Sardou resents the selling of the liner SS France by the President of France Valéry Giscard d'Estaing. A very controversial song, it was welcomed by the French Communist Party despite their view of Sardou as being a reactionary due to other songs of his.
- "Être une femme" ("Being a woman"), released in 1981. A satirical view on the evolution of women's social status. Sardou makes a list of different jobs expected to be occupied by women (police officer, whore, President of France...) but specifies that whatever they do, they still retain their femininity.
- "Les lacs du Connemara" ("The Lakes of Connemara"), released in 1981. A lyrical evocation of Ireland and another one of his most popular songs, it is very often sung at the end of French student parties and at weddings in France or in Belgium. The song also has a tourism impact, with an estimated 350,000 additional visits to Connemara. Kylemore Abbey, the first tourist attraction in the region, has 20% French visitors, and guided tours are offered in this language. Of the 350,000 French who visit Ireland annually, more than half go to Connemara.
- "Musulmanes" ("Muslim women"), released in 1986. Sardou casts a pessimistic gaze on the status of women in Arabic countries. The song received, in 1987, the Music Victory for the best song of the year.
- "La rivière de notre enfance" ("The River of our childhood"), released in 2004. Performed in duet with the Canadian singer Garou, the song nostalgically evokes the traces of our childhood which persist in our lives. This song, extracted from his album Du plaisir, also marked his comeback after three years of inactivity.

=== Collaborations and appearances ===
- 1980: Musical Les Misérables
- 1989: "Pour toi Arménie", collective charity song headed by Charles Aznavour
- 2000: Happy Birthday Live – Parc de Sceaux 15 June 2000 (live album that remained unpublished from 2000 until album 2020), in duet with Johnny Hallyday on "Quelque chose de Tennessee"
- 2004: Eddy Mitchell's Frenchy Tour, released as a live album, where Sardou sang in duet the song "Sur la route de Memphis"

=== Victoires de la Musique ===
| Preceded by Laurent Voulzy | Song of the year 1987 – "Musulmanes" | Succeeded by Maxime Le Forestier |
| Preceded by | Award for the biggest number of spectators 1990 | Succeeded by |
| Preceded by Francis Cabrel | Male artist of the year 1991 | Succeeded by Patrick Bruel |
| Preceded by | Award for the biggest number of spectators 1999 | Succeeded by |

== Other activities ==
=== Theatre manager ===
Sardou was the owner of the Théâtre de la Porte Saint-Martin in Paris from 2001 to 2003.

=== Theatre actor ===
- 1996 : Bagatelle(s) by Noël Coward, directed by Pierre Mondy, in the Théâtre de Paris, with Natacha Amal, Philippe Khorsand, Frédéric Diefenthal...
- 1999 : Comédie privée by Neil Simon, directed by Adrian Brine, in the Théâtre du Gymnase Marie Bell, with Marie-Anne Chazel.
- 2001–2002 : L'Homme en question by Félicien Marceau, directed by Jean-Luc Tardieu, on tour and in the Théâtre de la Porte Saint-Martin, with Brigitte Fossey, Davy Sardou...
- 2008–2009 : Secret de famille by Éric Assous, directed by Jean-Luc Moreau, in the Théâtre des Variétés, with Davy Sardou, Laurent Spielvogel, Mathilde Penin, Elisa Servier and Rita Brantalou.
- 2014 : Si on recommençait by Éric-Emmanuel Schmitt, directed by Steve Suissa, in the Théâtre des Champs-Élysées, with Anna Gaylor and Florence Coste.
- 2015 : Représailles by Éric Assous, in the Théâtre de la Michodière, with Marie-Anne Chazel.

=== Film actor ===
- 1982 : L'été de nos 15 ans by Marcel Jullian: Bernard. with Cyrielle Claire, Elisa Servier and others
- 1987 : Cross by Philippe Setbon: Thomas Crosky, called Cross. With Roland Giraud, Patrick Bauchau, Marie-Anne Chazel and others
- 1990 : Promotion canapé by Didier Kaminka: Bernard. With Grace de Capitani, Thierry Lhermitte, Claude Rich, Patrick Chesnais, Jean-Pierre Castaldi, Zabou, Martin Lamotte, Pierre Richard, Eddy Mitchell and others

=== TV actor ===
- 1993: L'irlandaise by José Giovanni : Régis Cassani. With Jean-Michel Dupuis, Thérèse Liotard...
- 2003: Le prix de l'honneur by Gérard Marx : le colonel Christian Legoff. With Alexandra Vandernoot...
