= Frank Geney =

German-born French film and television actor

- Born: 22 May 1979; Trier, Rhineland-Palatinate, Germany
- Died: 18 July 2013 (aged 34); Paris, France
- Occupations: Film and television actor

Frank Geney (22 May 1979 – 18 July 2013) was a German-born French film and television actor. He was best known for playing Fred, an economics student in the French sitcom television series Le Groupe.

== Life and career ==
Geney was born in Trier, Rhineland-Palatinate. He studied acting at the Cours Florent in Paris in the 1990s, and he began his screen career in 2001, starring as Fred in the France 2 sitcom television series Le Groupe, starring along with Géraldine Lapalus, Barbara Cabrita, Sandra Lou and Jérémy Michalak.

Later in his career, in 2003, Geney starred as Mike MacDonald in the M6 television series Meme Age, Meme Adresse, starring along with Cabrita, Justine Bruneau de la Salle and Mickaël Collart. After the series ended in 2004, he guest-starred in television programs including Père et Maire, Une femme d'honneur, Commissaire Moulin, Le Main Blance, Commissaire Valence, Alex Santana, Négociateur and Section de recherches. He also appeared in films such as Touristes? Oh yes! and The Good Move.

Geney retired from acting in 2010, last appearing in the film Citizen K.O.

== Death ==
Geney died of a heart attack in Paris on 8 July 2013, at the age of 34.
