= Saint-Romain-sur-Gironde =

- Part of Floirac
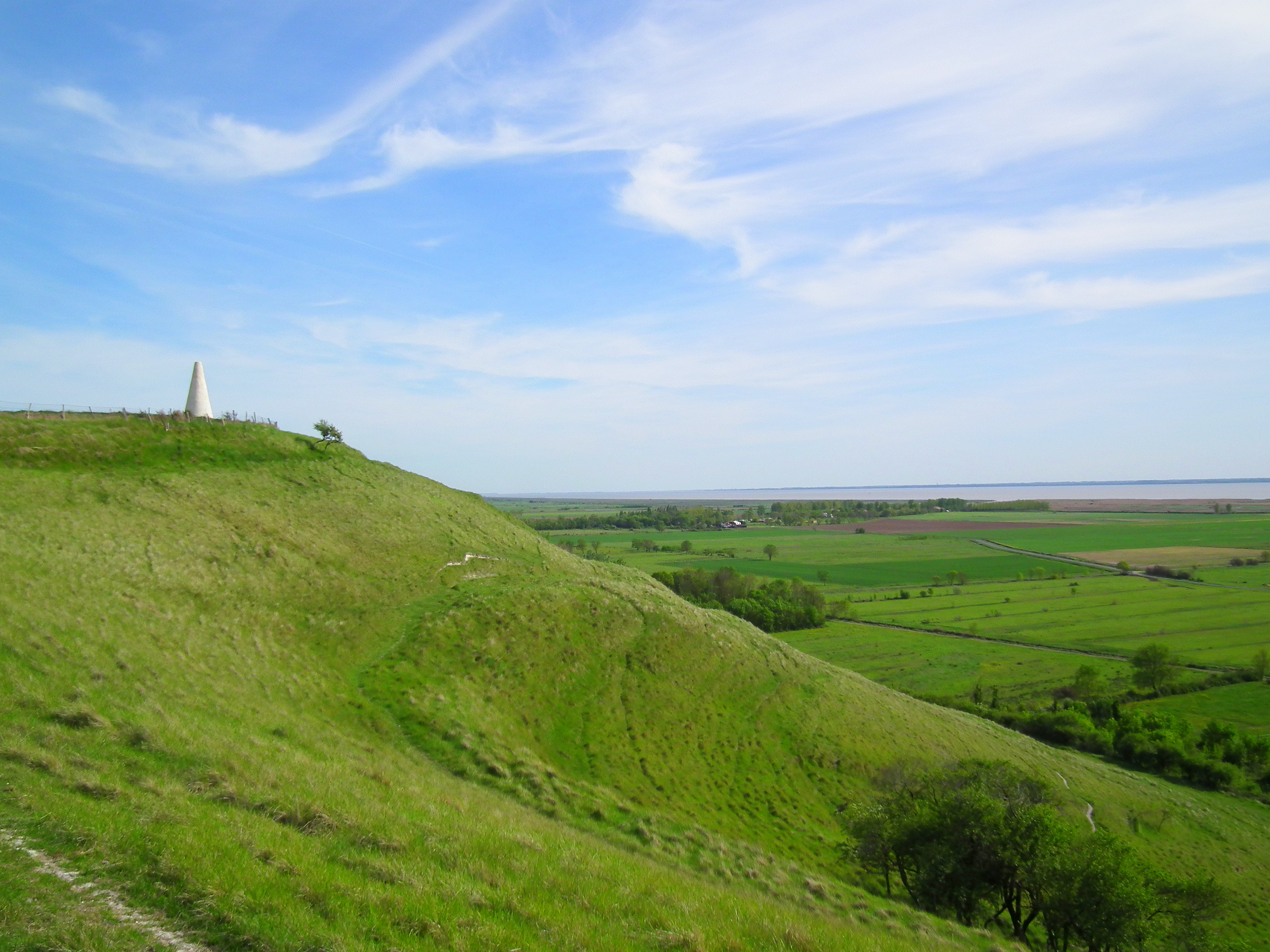
- Butte de Beaumont
- Location of Saint-Romain-sur-Gironde
- Location within France Location within Nouvelle-Aquitaine
- Coordinates: 45°27′03″N 0°45′23″W
- Country: France
- Region: Nouvelle-Aquitaine
- Department: Charente-Maritime
- Arrondissement: Saintes
- Canton: Saintonge Estuaire
- Commune: Floirac
- Area^{1}: 3.16 km^{2} (1.22 sq mi)
- Highest elevation: 30 m (98 ft)
- Lowest elevation: 1 m (3.3 ft)
- Population (2015): 64
  - Density: 20/km^{2} (52/sq mi)
- Time zone: UTC+01:00 (CET)
  - Summer (DST): UTC+02:00 (CEST)
- Postal code: 17240
- ^{1} French Land Register data, which excludes lakes, ponds, glaciers > 1 km^{2} (0.386 sq mi or 247 acres) and river estuaries.

Saint-Romain-sur-Gironde (French pronunciation: [sɛ̃ ʁɔmɛ̃ syʁ ʒiʁɔ̃d], literally Saint-Romain on Gironde) is a former commune in the Charente-Maritime department in southwestern France. On 1 January 2018, it was merged into the commune of Floirac.

== See also ==
- Communes of the Charente-Maritime department
