= Le Romain =

Le Romain is a French epithet for "the Roman" which may refer to:

- Jacques Dumont le Romain (1704—1781), French painter called "le Romain"
- Jean-Baptiste-Pierre le Romain, eighteenth-century French engineer and contributor to the Encyclopédie
- Pierre Mignard (1612–1695), French painter called "Mignard le Romain" to distinguish him from his brother Nicolas Mignard
