= Fernand Sardou =

French singer and actor (1910–1976)

Fernand Sardou (18 September 1910 – 31 January 1976) was a French singer and actor.

Sardou was the father of Michel Sardou, and he married Jackie Rollin (Jackie Sardou), an actress. His two grandsons are French novelist Romain Sardou and French actor Davy Sardou.

== Partial filmography ==
- Le moulin dans le soleil (1938)
- Grandfather (1939) – Le jeune homme
- Bifur 3 (1945)
- Les cadets de l'océan (1945) – Auguste
- Miroir (1947) – Un membre de la bande à Folco
- Le voleur se porte bien (1948) – Cabassol – le chauffeur
- If It Makes You Happy (1948) – Joseph Castanino
- Murders (1950) – Le garagiste
- Oriental Port (1950) – Gustave
- Coeur-sur-Mer (1950) – Titin
- Savage Triangle (1951) – L'inspecteur
- Village Feud (1951) – Forgeral
- My Wife, My Cow and Me (1952)
- Forbidden Fruit (1952) – Fontvielle
- Manon of the Spring (1952) – Philoxène, le maire
- The Call of Destiny (1953) – Dottore Aldo Guarneri
- The Baker of Valorgue (1953) – Le Brigadier
- When You Read This Letter (1953) – Le garagiste
- Napoleon Road (1953) – Le maire de Bourg-sur-Bléone
- Virgile (1953) – Latripe
- Service Entrance (1954) – Scarfatti
- Letters from My Windmill (1954) – Monsieur Charnigue – l'apothicaire (segment "Élixir du père Gaucher, l'")
- Sur le banc (1954) – Monsieur Canavez
- Spring, Autumn and Love (1955) – Calvette (uncredited)
- Rififi (1955) – First Gambler (uncredited)
- M'sieur la Caille (1955) – Rir
- Four Days in Paris (1955) – Montaron
- Marguerite de la nuit (1955) – Le patron du café
- Mémoires d'un flic (1956) – L'homme politique
- The Terror with Women (1956) – Le commissaire de police
- Élisa (1957) – M. Alfred
- Que les hommes sont bêtes (1957) – M. Marcel
- Love in Jamaica (1957) – Maxime de Sainte-Maxime
- Irresistible Catherine (1957) – Bouche
- Les Espions (1957) – Pierre
- Filous et compagnie (1957) – Le faux colonel
- La Parisienne (1957) – Fernand le Barman
- Not Delivered (1958) – Monsieur Arpaillargues
- Why Women Sin (1958) – Mario le Toulonnais
- Sunday Encounter (1958) – Le brigadier
- Suivez-moi jeune homme (1958) – Emile
- Vice Squad (1959) – Le commissaire Masson
- I Tartassati (1959) – Ernesto
- Picnic on the Grass (1959) – Nino
- Business (1960) – Commissaire Masson
- Bouche cousue (1960) – Marius
- Axel Munthe, The Doctor of San Michele (1962) – Petit-Piere
- Les grands chemins (1963) – Gendarme
- Cadavres en vacances (1963) – Lever
- D'où viens-tu Johnny? (1963) – Gustave, dit "Le Shérif"
- La bande à Bobo (1963) – Le maire
- Les durs à cuire ou Comment supprimer son prochain sans perdre l'appétit (1964) – L'inspecteur
- The Troops of St. Tropez (1964) – Le paysan
- The Duke's Gold (1965) – Le livreur d'eau
- Dis-moi qui tuer (1965) – M. Pesel
- L'ardoise (1970)
- Sur un arbre perché (1971) – L'adjudant-chef
- Le soldat Laforêt (1972) – Le vagabond
- Trop jolies pour être honnêtes (1972) – Pizarel, un gardien de prison
- Na! (1973) – Le bedeau
- Dédé la tendresse (1974)
- Les grands moyens (1976) – Camille Conségude (final film role)
