= Jacqueline Danno =

French actress and singer (1931–2021)

Jacqueline Danno (27 November 1931 – 28 November 2021) was a French actress and singer. Danno died on 28 November 2021, one day after turning 90.
