= Jackie Sardou =

French actress (1919–1998)

- Born: Jacqueline Labbé; 7 April 1919; Paris, France
- Died: 2 April 1998 (aged 78); Paris, France
- Burial place: Cimetière nouveau Neuilly-sur-Seine (1998-2006); Cimetière du Grand Jas, Cannes, France (since 2006)
- Occupation: Actress
- Years active: 1935–1995
- Spouse: Fernand Sardou (m. 1945; died 1976)
- Children: Michel Sardou
- Relatives: Romain and Davy Sardou (grandsons)

Jackie Sardou (7 April 1919 – 2 April 1998) was a French actress.

== Personal life ==
She was born Jacqueline Labbé in Paris, and married Fernand Sardou, a singer.

She was the mother of singer Michel Sardou; and grandmother of author Romain Sardou and actor Davy Sardou.

She died in 1998, five days before her 79th birthday.

== Theatre ==
Year	Title	Author	Director	Notes
1947-1949	Baratin	Marc Cab & Jean Valmy	Jean Valmy	Théâtre de l'Européen
1948	Hier contre aujourd'hui	Robert Beauvais & Michel Vaucaire	Lucien Rimels	Théâtre des Célestins
1960	Impasse de la fidélité	Alexandre Breffort	Jean-Pierre Grenier	Théâtre des Ambassadeurs
1968	Désiré	Sacha Guitry	Pierre Dux	Théâtre du Palais-Royal
1976	Knock	Jules Romains	Jean Meyer	Théâtre des Célestins
1977-1979	Féfé de Broadway	Jean Poiret	Pierre Mondy	Théâtre des Variétés
1979-1981	Tovaritch	Jacques Deval	Jean Meyer	Théâtre de la Madeleine
1980	L'Intoxe	Françoise Dorin	Jean-Laurent Cochet	Théâtre du Palais-Royal
1981-1983	Chéri	Colette	Jean-Laurent Cochet	Théâtre des Variétés
1984	Brocéliande	Henry de Montherlant	Jean Meyer	Théâtre des Célestins
1985	Les Femmes Savantes	Molière	Jean Meyer	Théâtre des Célestins
1985-1986	N'écoutez pas, mesdames !	Sacha Guitry	Pierre Mondy	Théâtre des Variétés
1990	Le Clan des veuves	Ginette Garcin	François Guérin	Théâtre Fontaine
1995	Laisse faire Nini	Laurence Jyl	François Guérin	Théâtre Eldorado

== Filmography ==
Year	Title	Role	Director	Notes
1948	If It Makes You Happy	The florist	Jacques Daniel-Norman	
1950	Meurtres ?	A friend	Richard Pottier	
1950	Coeur-sur-Mer	Lulu's maid	Jacques Daniel-Norman	
1950	Street Without a King	The nanny	Marcel Gibaud	
1951	Monte Carlo Baby	Madame Bindinelli	Jean Boyer	
1952	Forbidden Fruit	The boy's mother	Henri Verneuil	
1953	The Call of Destiny		Georges Lacombe	
1953	Their Last Night	The concierge	Georges Lacombe	
1954	Tourments		Jacques Daniel-Norman	
1954	Death on the Run	The theatrical	André Berthomieu	
1955	M'sieur la Caille	Madame Riri	André Pergament	
1955	Four Days in Paris	Zénaïde	André Berthomieu	
1955	Je suis un sentimental	The concierge	John Berry	
1955	Spring, Autumn and Love		Gilles Grangier	
1956	Maid in Paris		Pierre Gaspard-Huit	
1956	Les carottes sont cuites		Robert Vernay	
1957	Let's Be Daring, Madame	A passenger on the bus	Robert Vernay	
1957	Fric-frac en dentelles	Madame Espinasse	Guillaume Radot	
1957	Que les hommes sont bêtes		Roger Richebé	
1957	The Seventh Commandment	Hélène	Raymond Bernard	
1957	Le chômeur de Clochemerle	Madame Donjazu	Jean Boyer	
1958	Women's Prison	Lulu	Maurice Cloche	
1958	Le désert de Pigalle	Madame Cazeneuve	Léo Joannon	
1958	Suivez-moi jeune homme		Guy Lefranc	
1958	Les Cinq Dernières Minutes	Madame Riotord	Claude Loursais	TV series (1 episode)
1959	Drôles de phénomènes		Robert Vernay	
1960	La Vérité	The concierge	Henri-Georges Clouzot	
1960	The Love Game		Philippe de Broca	
1960	Au coeur de la ville		Pierre Gautherin	
1960	Airs de France	Margot	Guy Lessertisseur	TV series (1 episode)
1962	L'inspecteur Leclerc enquête	The concierge	Claude Barma	TV series (1 episode)
1963	La bande à Bobo		Tony Saytor	
1963	Three Girls in Paris		Gabriel Axel	
1965	Les saintes chéries	Madame Martin	Maurice Delbez	TV series (1 episode)
1965	Foncouverte	Madame Binibinci	Robert Guez	TV series (18 episodes)
1966	Allô police	The second concierge	Robert Guez	TV series (1 episode)
1968	Ho!	Mado	Robert Enrico	
1968	La Prisonnière	The cashier	Henri-Georges Clouzot	
1968	Béru et ces dames	Berthe Bérurier	Guy Lefranc	
1970	Atlantic Wall	Angèle Charlus	Marcel Camus	
1974	Les Faucheurs de marguerites	Madame Perrier	Marcel Camus	TV mini-series
1974	Malaventure	Marguerite	Joseph Drimal	TV series (1 episode)
1974	Le Poulain au galop		Jacques Pierre	TV series (2 episodes)
1975	Opération Lady Marlène	The concierge	Robert Lamoureux	
1975	On a retrouvé la 7ème compagnie !	Madame Crouzy	Robert Lamoureux	
1975	Adieu Amédée	Amédée's wife	Jean-Paul Carrère	TV movie
1976	Les grands moyens	Josette Conségude	Hubert Cornfield	
1976	Le chasseur de chez Maxim's	Marguerite	Claude Vital	
1977	Rendez-vous en noir	The passenger	Claude Grinberg	TV mini-series
1977	Les folies Offenbach	Madame Mirador	Michel Boisrond	TV mini-series
1978	Freddy	The bearded woman	Robert Thomas	
1979	New Generation	The boss of the hotel	Jean-Pierre Lowf Legoff	
1979	Histoires de voyous	The matron	Michel Wyn	TV series (1 episode)
1980	L'inconnue d'Arras	Mother Venot	Raymond Rouleau	TV movie
1980	Les amours du mal-aimé	The concierge	Marcel Camus	TV movie
1981	Histoire contemporaine	Joséphine	Michel Boisrond	TV mini-series
1982	T'es folle ou quoi?	The guardian	Michel Gérard	
1982	On s'en fout... nous on s'aime	The cleaner	Michel Gérard	
1982	On n'est pas sorti de l'auberge	Madame Sulpice	Max Pécas	
1982	Les amours des années grises	Madame Panaro	Agnès Delarive	TV series (1 episode)
1984	Adam et Ève	Esther Ben Hoït	Jean Luret	
1984	Retenez Moi...Ou Je Fais Un Malheur	The opera opener	Michel Gérard	
1984	The Vengeance of the Winged Serpent	The concierge	Gérard Oury	
1984	Par où t'es rentré ? On t'a pas vu sortir	Pauline	Philippe Clair	
1986	Gros dégueulasse	The strawberry seller	Bruno Zincone	
1986	La vie dissolue de Gérard Floque	The autograph beggar	Georges Lautner	
1987	Maguy	Madame Bignole	Jean-Claude Charnay	TV series (1 episode)
1988	Les Gauloises blondes	The witch	Jean Jabely	
1992	Les mamies	Zézette	Annick Lanoë	
