= Saint-Romain-et-Saint-Clément =

- Commune
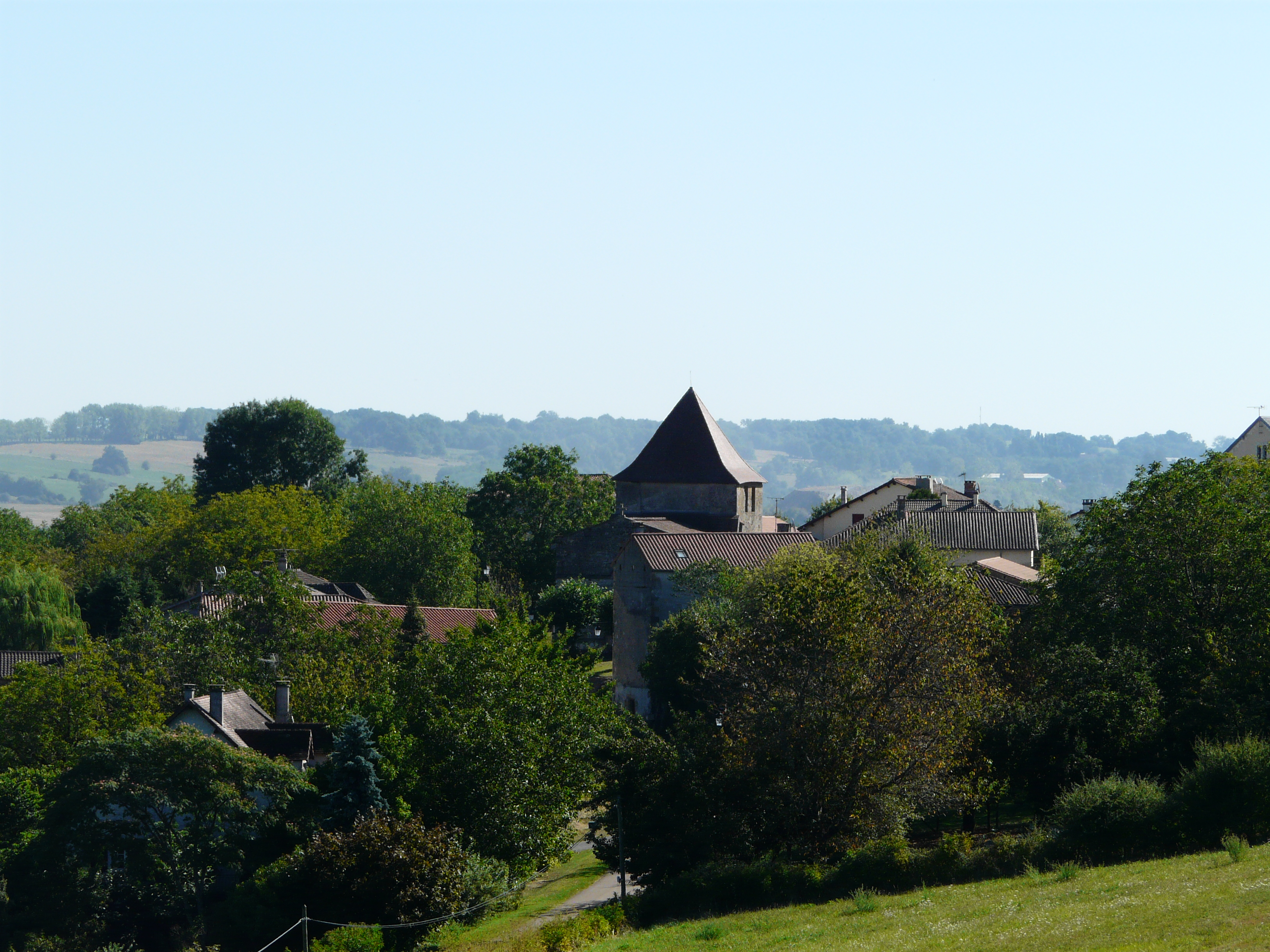
- A general view of Saint-Romain-et-Saint-Clément
- Location of Saint-Romain-et-Saint-Clément
- Location within France Location within Nouvelle-Aquitaine
- Coordinates: 45°25′30″N 0°51′52″E
- Country: France
- Region: Nouvelle-Aquitaine
- Department: Dordogne
- Arrondissement: Nontron
- Canton: Thiviers

Government
  - Mayor (2020–2026): Michel Ranouil
- Area^{1}: 13.8 km^{2} (5.3 sq mi)
- Elevation: 243 m (797 ft)
- Highest elevation: 268 m (879 ft)
- Lowest elevation: 147 m (482 ft)
- Population (2023): 333
  - Density: 24.1/km^{2} (62.5/sq mi)
- Time zone: UTC+01:00 (CET)
  - Summer (DST): UTC+02:00 (CEST)
- INSEE/Postal code: 24496 /24800
- ^{1} French Land Register data, which excludes lakes, ponds, glaciers > 1 km^{2} (0.386 sq mi or 247 acres) and river estuaries.

Saint-Romain-et-Saint-Clément (French pronunciation: [sɛ̃ ʁɔmɛ̃ e sɛ̃ klemɑ̃]; Limousin: Sent Róman e Sent Clamenç) is a commune in the Dordogne department in Nouvelle-Aquitaine in southwestern France.

In 1827, the municipalities of St. Clement and St. Romain merged under the name of Saint-Romain-et-Saint-Clement.

== Geography ==
The Côle forms the commune's northeastern border, then flows west-southwest through the middle of the commune.

== Population ==
Historical population
| Year | Pop. | ±% p.a. |
|---|---|---|
| 1968 | 295 | — |
| 1975 | 260 | −1.79% |
| 1982 | 309 | +2.50% |
| 1990 | 332 | +0.90% |
| 1999 | 357 | +0.81% |
| 2007 | 331 | −0.94% |
| 2012 | 324 | −0.43% |
| 2017 | 328 | +0.25% |
| 2023 | 333 | +0.25% |
Source: INSEE

== See also ==
- Communes of the Dordogne department
