= Floirac, Charente-Maritime =

Floirac
- Commune
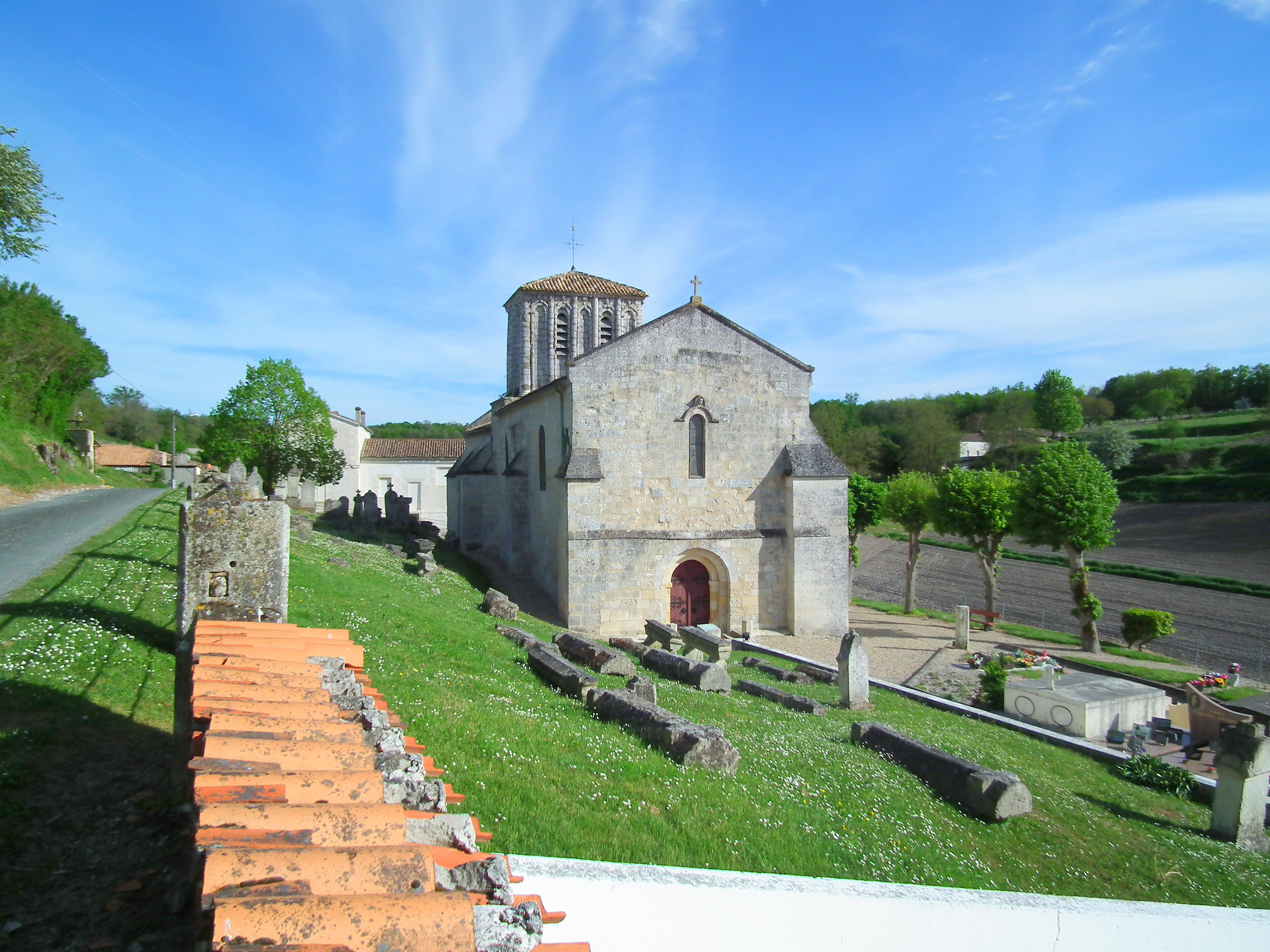
- The church in Floirac

- Coat of arms
- Location of Floirac
- Location within France Location within Nouvelle-Aquitaine
- Coordinates: 45°28′38″N 0°44′52″W
- Country: France
- Region: Nouvelle-Aquitaine
- Department: Charente-Maritime
- Arrondissement: Saintes
- Canton: Saintonge Estuaire
- Intercommunality: CA Royan Atlantique

Government
  - Mayor (2020–2026): Bernard Laumonier
- Area^{1}: 16.02 km^{2} (6.19 sq mi)
- Highest elevation: 68 m (223 ft)
- Lowest elevation: 1 m (3.3 ft)
- Population (2023): 420
  - Density: 26/km^{2} (68/sq mi)
- Time zone: UTC+01:00 (CET)
  - Summer (DST): UTC+02:00 (CEST)
- INSEE/Postal code: 17160 /17120
- ^{1} French Land Register data, which excludes lakes, ponds, glaciers > 1 km^{2} (0.386 sq mi or 247 acres) and river estuaries.

Floirac (French pronunciation: [flwaʁak]) is a commune in the Charente-Maritime department in Nouvelle-Aquitaine, southwestern France. On 1 January 2018, the former commune of Saint-Romain-sur-Gironde was merged into Floirac. Floirac is situated near the Gironde estuary, 27 km southeast of Royan.

== Population ==
Historical population
Year	Pop.	±% p.a.
1968	391	—
1975	389	−0.07%
1982	307	−3.33%
1990	338	+1.21%
1999	343	+0.16%
2007	385	+1.45%
2012	372	−0.68%
2017	371	−0.05%
2023	420	+2.09%
Source: INSEE

== See also ==
- Communes of the Charente-Maritime department
