= Romaine (name) =

Romaine is both a given name and a surname. It may refer to:

== People ==
=== Given name ===
- Romaine Brooks (1874–1970), American painter
- Romaine Fielding (1868–1927), American actor, screenwriter and film director
- Romaine Foege (born 1938), American politician
- Romaine-la-Prophétesse (born c. 1750), Haitian planter and revolutionary
- Romaine Morrison (born 1995), Jamaican cricketer
- Romaine Patterson (born 1978), American gay rights activist, radio personality, and author
- Romaine Quinn (born 1990), American politician

=== Surname ===
- Austin Romaine (born 2004), American football player
- Barbara Romaine (born 1959), American academic and translator of Arabic literature
- Irving Romaine (born 1972), Bermudian cricketer
- Margaret Romaine (1888–1984), American soprano singer
- Suzanne Romaine (born 1951), American linguist
- William Henri Romaine-Walker (1854–1940), English architect
- William Romaine (1714–1795), evangelical divine

==== See also ====
- Paul Romaines (born 1955), English cricketer

== Fictional characters ==
- Romaine Vole, in Agatha Christie's short story and play "Witness for the Prosecution"
- Ruby Romaine, portrayed by Tracey Ullman in the television series Tracey Takes On...
