= Rita Brantalou =

French humorist and musician (1948–2021)

- Born: Jacques Pradel; 8 July 1948; Boulogne-Billancourt, France
- Died: 21 July 2021 (aged 73)
- Occupations: Humorist; Musician

Rita Brantalou, stage name of Jacques Pradel, (8 July 1948 – 21 July 2021) was a French humorist and musician.

== Biography ==
After earning a bachelor's degree, Pradel began a career as a designer. He became a guitarist, singer, and bassist for the rock band Au Bonheur des Dames in 1974 and registered with the Société des auteurs, compositeurs et éditeurs de musique on 3 February 1975. He chose the pseudonym Ricky Brantalou, the first name of which was later changed to Rita.

Pradel separated from Au Bonheur des Dames and formed a different group, Odeurs, with Ramon Pipin in 1979. That year, he also became an actor in a troupe led by Stéphane Collaro for the television series Co-Co Boy, Cocoricocoboy, and Collaricocoshow. He regularly portrayed the character Michou-Bidou and wrote a number of sketches.

Pradel first began writing plays in 1985 alongside his rock career. Throughout the 1990s, he was an actor in multiple series and films.

Rita Brantalou died on 21 July 2021 at the age of 73.

== Discography ==
=== With Au Bonheur des Dames ===
==== Studio albums ====
- Twist (1974)
- Coucou maman (1975)
- Halte là! (1976)
- Jour de fête (1987)
- Métal moumoute (2016)

==== Live Albums ====
- Les adieux (live) (1997)

==== Compilations ====
- Quart de touist (2007)

=== With Odeurs ===
==== Singles ====
- Youpi la France! (1979)
- L'homme objet / La viande de porc (1979)
- Que c'est bon / L'amour (1981)
- Chanson à la mode / Triple slow (1982)
- Le cri du kangourou / Concours Lépine (1983)
- Optimiste / Toujours moins toujours (1983)

==== Albums ====
- Ramon Pipin's Odeurs (1979)
- Optimiste : Enregistrement public (1979)
- 1980 : No Sex ! (1980)
- De l'amour (1981)
- Toujours plus haut (1983)

==== Compilations ====
- Fragrances & Remugles (1991)
- L'intégrale Saison 1 1979-1983 (2007)
- L'intégrale Saison 2 1984-... (2008)

=== Solo ===
- Ratatouille (single, 1985)

=== Other works ===
- On Achève Bien Les Chevaux (with Dominique Grange, 1981)

== Filmography ==
- Radio Corbeau (1989)
- La Tribu (1991)
- Cut (1992)
- Les Carnassiers (1993)
- L'Affaire Dreyfus (1996)
