= Géraldine Lapalus =

French actress and model

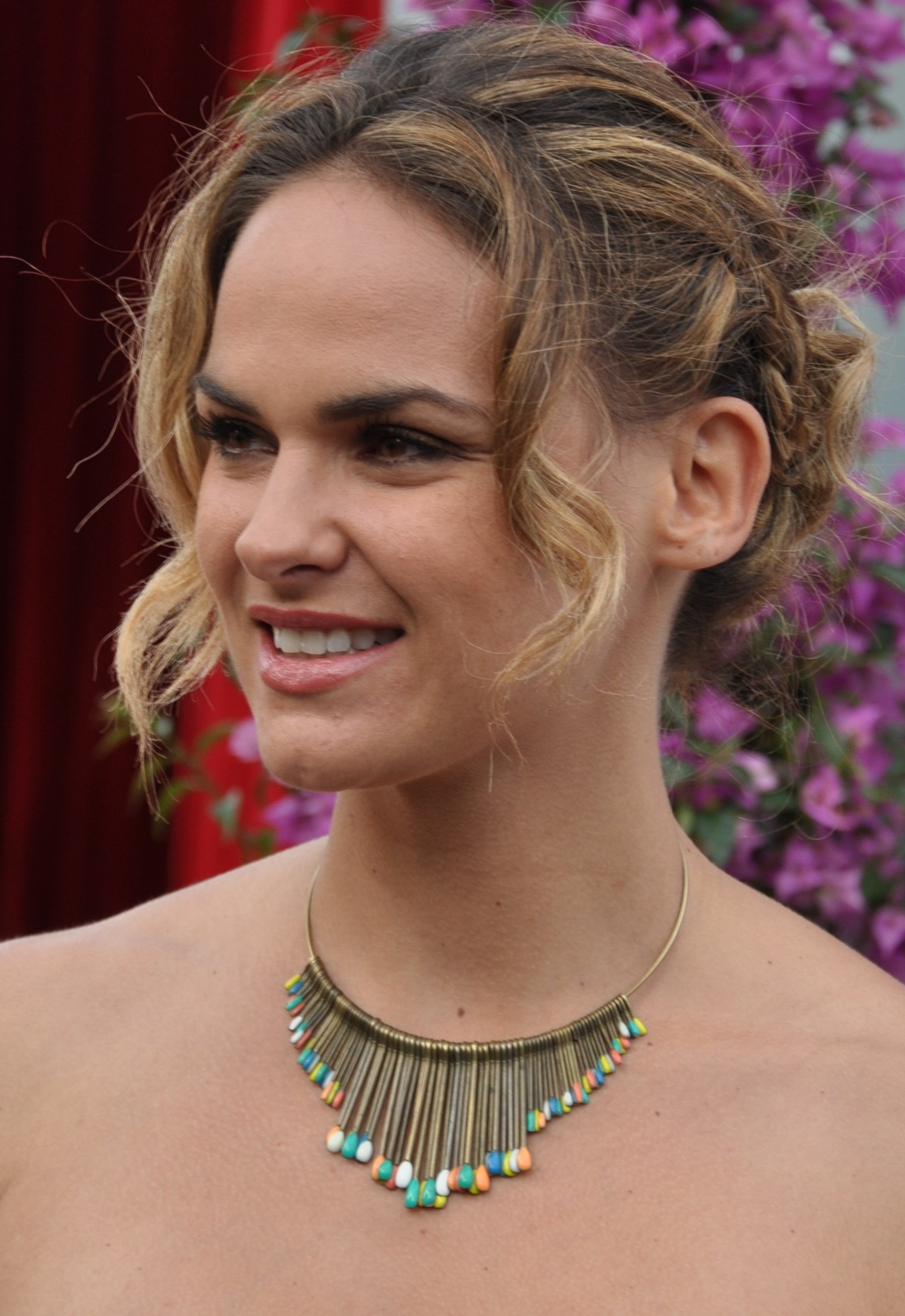
- Lapalus in 2013
- Born: 8 November 1979 (age 46); Marseille, Bouches-du-Rhône, France
- Occupations: actress; model
- Website: geraldinelapalus.free.fr

Géraldine Lapalus (born 8 November 1979) is a French actor and model. Lapalus is best known for her role in La légende (2018) and roles in television series Sous le soleil, Plus belle la vie and Fort Boyard.

== Biography ==
=== Early life ===
Lapalus was born on November 8, 1979, in Marseille, Bouches-du-Rhône, France the older of two girls and one boy. From a very young age Lapalus took a liking to comedy and performed small comedy shows for her friends and family. She attended secondary school and at the age of 17 began modeling after finishing school she began modeling full-time.

=== Career ===
In 2001 she joined the major modeling agency Marc Fiszman and began shooting with them. In March 2001 she was approached to be play a main role in the sitcom Le Groupe. During the filming she met fellow comedian Nathalie Grown where the two starred in sixty eight episodes. In 2003 she was a guest star in an episode of Sous le soleil. In 2004, she appeared in an episode of The Camargue on France 3, and the following year participated in several episodes of Plus belle la vie where she played the roles of the Secretary of Livia, in two episodes, then Elodie, in two other episodes. That same year she began hosting Sportez-vous bien as well as the animated series Chain Marseille.

In 2006, she landed the leading role of Amandine in the TV movie TF1 Camping Paradise, she played in the Gorges du verdon, with Laurent Ournac, Princess Erika and Jennifer Lauret. The beginning of 2007 saw its first significant contract as the host TV when the M6 group uses it to animate the daily music show Live Clip'in live on W9. A few weeks later, she is called to co-host live alongside Alexandre Delpérier in the program Six Music Star on M6. In 2008, after appearing in two episodes of the series Five Sisters on France 2, Geraldine began filming the 6 SOS 18 season with the recurring role of Ariadne and those of the new series of M6 No secrets between us in which she plays Laura in 17 episodes. She also participated in the filming of Camp Paradise 3 by Philippe Proteau.

In 2009, it turns in the series Understand and forgive on M6 as well as four new episodes of Camping Paradise. Since 2010, she turns six episodes per year of Camping Paradise.

=== Personal life ===
On September 29, 2012, Lapalus married Julien Sassano a businessman and owner of a popular club in Marseille. They have one child, June. Lapalus has two younger siblings Amélie Zorzetto an actress and Cyprien Lapalus who is a musician and an actor.

== Filmography ==
=== Film ===
Year	Film	Role	Notes
2018	La légende	Laure	

=== Television ===
Year	Show	Role	Notes
2001– 2002	Le Groupe (fr)	Géraldine	Appeared in 66 episodes
2003	Sous le soleil	Conception	
2005	Plus belle la vie	Élodie / Dr Livia	
2006– 2018	Camping paradis (fr)		
2008	Cinq Sœurs (fr)	Louise	
2008	Pas de secrets entre nous (fr)	Laura	
2008– 2010	S.O.S. 18 (fr)	Ariane	
2009	Comprendre & pardonner (fr)	Alice	
2015– 2018	A votre service (fr)	Lucie Bouture	
2016	Vendredi, tout est permis avec Arthur (fr)	Herself	
2017	Stars sous hypnose (fr)	Herself	
2017– 2019	Fort Boyard	Herself	Game show appearance
2018	Touche pas à mon poste!	Herself	Talk show appearance
2019	Fort Boyard: toujours plus fort! (fr)	Herself	

== Awards and nominations ==
Year	Ceremony	Award	Work	Result
2019	Five Continents International Film Festival	Best Team Performance Feature Film	La légende	Won
2019	Olympus Film Festival	Best Ensemble Cast	La légende	Nominated
2019	South Film and Arts Academy Festival	Best Team Performance in a Feature Film	La légende	Won
