= Romaine (Saône) =

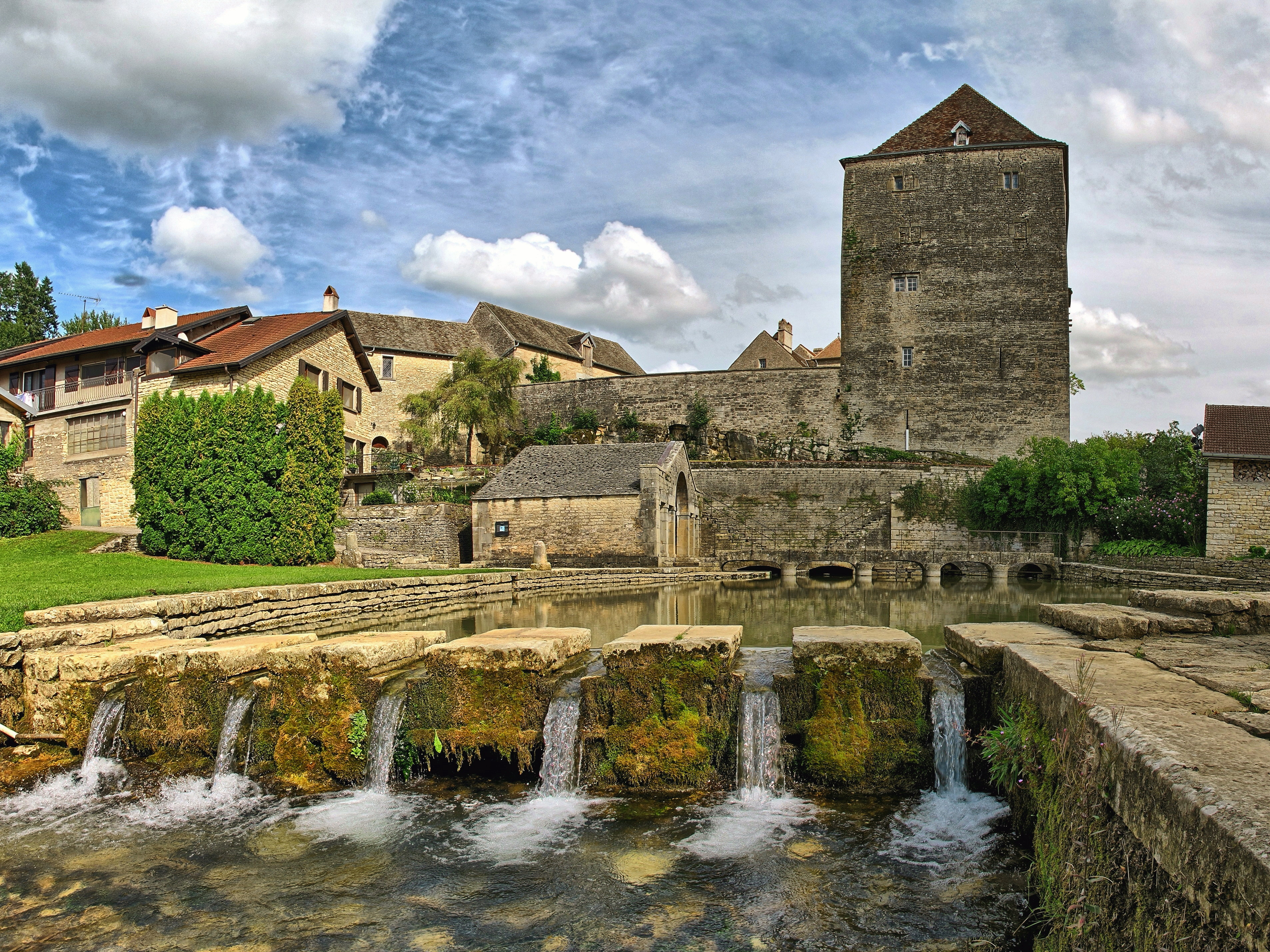

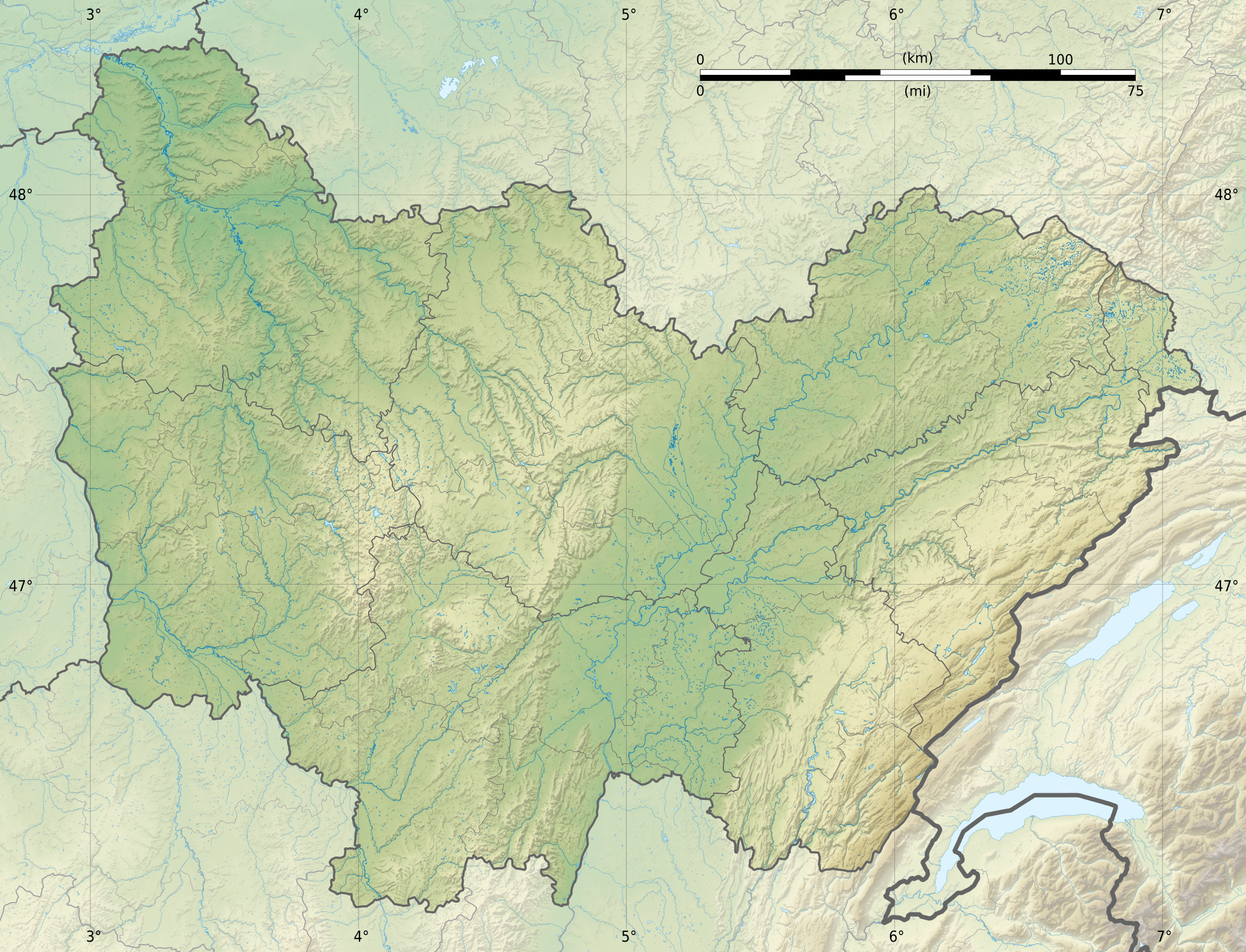
- Location within France Location within Bourgogne-Franche-Comté

Location
- Country: France

Physical characteristics
- Mouth: Saône
  - coordinates: 47.5687°N 5.8025°E
- Length: 25 km (16 mi)

Basin features
- Progression: Saône→ Rhône→ Mediterranean Sea

The Romaine (French pronunciation: [ʁɔmɛn]) is a 25.4 km long river in Haute-Saône in Bourgogne-Franche-Comté, eastern France. It rises in Fondremand and flows generally west to join the Saône at Vellexon-Queutrey-et-Vaudey.
