= Romain Sardou =

French novelist (born 1974)

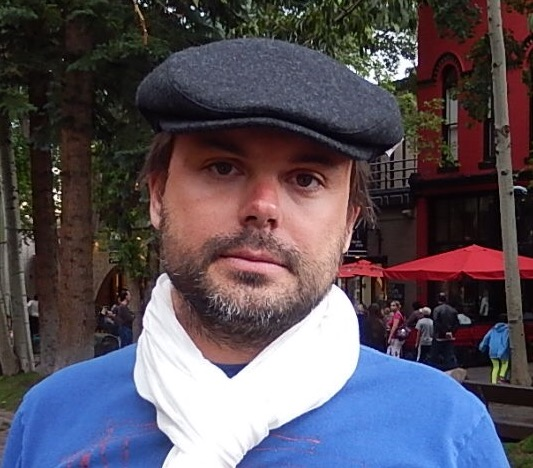
- Born: 6 January 1974 (age 52); Boulogne-Billancourt, France
- Occupation: Novelist
- Spouse: Francesca Gobbi (m. 1999; div. 2019)
- Children: 3
- Parent: Michel Sardou
- Relatives: Davy Sardou (brother); Fernand Sardou (grandfather); Jackie Sardou (grandmother)
- Writing career
- Genres: Crime novel, Science fiction, Historical novel, Franco-Belgian comics, Translation

Romain Sardou (born 6 January 1974) is a French novelist born in Boulogne-Billancourt, Hauts-de-Seine. He is the son of the singer and songwriter Michel Sardou.

== Biography ==
Romain Sardou was born comes from a long line of artists, singers, actors, and writers. At an early age, he developed a passion for opera—he was ten years old when he discovered his fascination for Richard Wagner. This precocious love led him to the discovery of the theater, then literature. His infatuation for reading quickly gained precedence over his love of music. He grew up among the works and lives of authors whom he cherished. This passion is almost all-encompassing and was to stay with him for life.

He left high school in the year before graduation with the firm intention of becoming a playwright. He enrolled in theater classes for three years in order to better understand the mechanics involved in the art of stage craft and more clearly discern the acting profession. In parallel, he engaged in numerous "writing exercises", all aimed at the theater. Unsatisfied, he settled in the country for four years during which he built up his book collection and read voraciously the works of historians. He then left the country to work for two years in Los Angeles, where he wrote scripts for children.

He eventually came back to France where he got married and wrote a successful first novel.

Romain Sardou is the father of three children (Aliénor, Gabriel & Victor-Scott). He wrote the tale entitled One Second Before Christmas for them.

== Bibliography ==
- Pardonnez nos offenses (Forgive us our Sins) (2002 XO éditions)
- L'Eclat de Dieu (The Spark of God) (2004 XO éditions) (2005 Pocket)
- Une Seconde avant Noël (One second before Christmas) (2005 XO éditions)
- Personne n'y échappera (No One will get out) (2006 XO éditions)
- Sauver Noël (Save Christmas) (2006 XO éditions)
- Délivrez-nous du Mal (Deliver us From Evil) (2008 XO éditions)
- L'Arche de Noël & other tales (The Christmas Ark) (2008 XO éditions)
- Lots of Love, Scott & Scottie, letters 1936-1940 by Francis Scott Fitzgerald & daughter Scottie (Frances Scott Fitzgerald), Bernard Pascuito Editions, 2008 (Translation in French)
- Quitte Rome ou meurs, (XO éditions, 2009)
- America

1. Book 1 : La Treizième Colonie, (The Thirteenth Colony - Georgia (U.S. state)) (XO éditions, 2010)
2. Book 2 : La Main Rouge (The Red Hand) (XO éditions, 2012)

- Fräulein France, (XO éditions, 2014)
- Mademoiselle France, (Pocket, 2015)
- Maxence (Comics)

1. Book 1 : La Sédition Nika (Nika riots) Le Lombard, 2014, Romain Sardou & Carlos Rafael Duarte
2. Book 1 : La Sédition Nika (Nika riots) New Edition Le Lombard, 2016, Romain Sardou & Carlos Rafael Duarte
3. Book 2 : L'Augusta Le Lombard, 2016, Romain Sardou & Carlos Rafael Duarte
4. Book 3 : Le Cygne noir Le Lombard, Announced 2017, Romain Sardou & Carlos Rafael Duarte

- Ben (Kids)

1. Book 1 : Ben - Super-Héros dans le noir, written with Francesca Sardou, illustrated by Lili La Baleine, Hachette Jeunesse, 2016
2. Book 2 : Ben - Super-Héros de la politesse, written with Francesca Sardou, illustrated by Lili La Baleine, Hachette Jeunesse, 2016
3. Book 3 : Ben - Super-Héros sans tototte, written with Francesca Sardou, illustrated by Lili La Baleine, Hachette Jeunesse, 2016
4. Book 4 : Ben - Super-Héros au grand coeur, written with Francesca Sardou, illustrated by Lili La Baleine, Hachette Jeunesse, 2016

- Un Homme averti ne vaut rien (Forewarned is not forearmed) (september 2016 XO éditions)

=== Forgive us our Sins ===
It was an unusually cold winter in 1284. The "chill winds of the Devil" isolate the small diocese of Draguan, in the county of Toulouse from the rest of the world.

Before the sight of the statue of the Virgin Mary broken by the cold, Romée de Haquin, its bishop, is not far from thinking that a curse is wreaking havoc on his parishes. Everything started when two young girls found the remains of tortured bodies in the river.

The savage murder of Haquin leaves the village prey to irrational fears. It is at this point that a mysterious priest, Henno Gui, makes his entrance. Accompanied by a young boy and by a hideously ugly man, he had been summoned by Haquin to take charge of the thirteenth parish of the diocese, Heurteloup. After three days of walking in a forest which is as dark as it is inextricable, the group reaches the entrance of a deserted village. The church is in ruins and many houses are abandoned. Surrounded by foul-smelling marshlands and suspected of carrying the plague, the parish has lived in oblivion for decades. Nobody knows what had happened to its inhabitants.

The thirteenth parish of the bishopric is omitted from some maps of the provostship, but it remains a subject of interest within the Vatican. Discussions regarding the parish have extended into the kingdom of France. The circumstances surrounding the parish relate to Romée de Haquin, Henno Gui, a local priest, or the parish itself.

==== Historical Characters in the Novel ====
- Pope Martin IV

=== The Spark of God ===
Deep beneath Jerusalem, from the beginning of time, lies an object that could change the world: the Spark of God.

At least that is what nine knights, willing to risk their lives in the attempt to recover it, believe. And when, in 1099, the long-awaited news of the liberation of Jerusalem comes at last, the knights promise their aid and protection to the thousands of pilgrims who set off for the Holy Land. They set about organising a vast pilgrimage, which will enable them to conceal their true aim.

But just before they set off, one of them is murdered. Whether by accident or by design, he leaves a packet of letters about the secret buried deep in the Holy Land - a secret known to King Solomon – for his nephew Cosimo to find. Soon the young man discovers that his uncle had organised everything as if in the knowledge that he would never return from the Holy Land. Why?

Cosimo determines to find out. Unbeknownst to everyone, he insinuates himself into one of the groups of pilgrims.

What will they be searching for in Jerusalem?

And now, imagine that the story of this novel is situated either in the past or in the future. But is it really the past and the future? And if it is, then why does everything happen in the same way?

==== Historical Characters in the Novel ====
- Bernard of Clairvaux
- Hugues de Payens
- Baldwin II of Jerusalem
- Robert de Craon
- Godfrey de Saint-Omer
- Andre de Montbard

==== Historical Places in the Novel ====
- Jerusalem
- Troyes
- Clairvaux Abbey
- County of Champagne
- Constantinople

==== See also ====
- Knights Templar
- Solomon's Temple
- First Crusade
- Pilgrimage
- Uchronie
- Time travel in fiction

=== One Second before Christmas ===
One Second before Christmas is set in mid-19th century England, and centers on Harold, an orphan and street urchin in Cokecuttle, a fictitious town in Lancashire, England.

Harold is selected to become the new Santa Claus and is tasked with delivering presents to children around the world. He is given the traditional red suit and white beard before beginning his assignment.

==== Places in One Second before Christmas ====
- Lancashire
- Equuleus
- North Pole
- Aberdeenshire

==== See also ====
- Victorian era
- Industrial Revolution
- Child labor
- Chimney sweep
