= List of French films of 1949 =

A list of films produced in France in 1949.

== A-L ==
Title	Director	Cast	Genre	Notes
56 Rue Pigalle	Willy Rozier	Jacques Dumesnil, Marie Déa, Aimé Clariond	Crime	
All Roads Lead to Rome	Jean Boyer	Micheline Presle, Gerard Philippe, Albert Rémy	Comedy	
At the Grand Balcony	Henri Decoin	Pierre Fresnay, Georges Marchal, Félix Oudart	Drama	Entered into the 1949 Cannes Film Festival
Barry	Richard Pottier	Pierre Fresnay, Simone Valère, Yves Deniaud	Historical	
The Barton Mystery	Charles Spaak	Françoise Rosay, Fernand Ledoux, Madeleine Robinson	Mystery	
The Battle of Feu	Maurice de Canonge	Pierre Larquey, Louis Florencie, Noëlle Norman, Yves Deniaud	Comedy drama	
Between Eleven and Midnight	Henri Decoin	Louis Jouvet, Madeleine Robinson, Monique Mélinand	Mystery	
Branquignol	Robert Dhéry	Colette Brosset, Julien Carette, Annette Poivre	Comedy	
Brilliant Waltz	Jean Boyer	Mártha Eggerth, Jan Kiepura, Lucien Baroux	Crime, Musical	
Cage of Girls	Maurice Cloche	Danièle Delorme, Louise Lagrange, Denise Bosc	Drama	
A Change in the Wind	Jean Faurez	Roger Pigaut, Sophie Desmarets, Louis Seigner	Comedy	
The Cupid Club	Marc-Gilbert Sauvajon	Pierre Blanchar, Simone Renant, Yves Vincent	Comedy	
The Dancer of Marrakesh	Léon Mathot	Yves Vincent, Katia Lova, Aimé Clariond	Drama	
Daybreak	Louis Daquin	Jean Desailly, René Lefèvre, Loleh Bellon	Drama	
Du Guesclin	Bernard de Latour	Fernand Gravey, Junie Astor, Ketti Gallian	Historical	
Doctor Laennec	Maurice Cloche	Pierre Blanchar, Saturnin Fabre, Mireille Perrey	Historical	
Emile the African	Robert Vernay	Fernandel, Alexandre Rignault, Noëlle Norman	Comedy	
Eve and the Serpent	Charles-Félix Tavano	Gaby Morlay, Félix Oudart, Jacqueline Gauthier	Comedy	
Fandango	Emil E. Reinert	Luis Mariano, Ludmilla Tchérina, Annette Poivre	Musical	
Fantomas Against Fantomas	Robert Vernay	Marcelle Chantal, Aimé Clariond, Maurice Teynac	Horror	
The Farm of Seven Sins	Jean Devaivre	Jacques Dumesnil, Claude Génia, Pierre Renoir	Historical	
Five Red Tulips	Jean Stelli	René Dary, Suzanne Dehelly, Raymond Bussières	Crime	
Forbidden to the Public	Alfred Pasquali	Jacques Erwin, Jacqueline Gauthier, Mary Marquet	Comedy	
Gigi	Jacqueline Audry	Gaby Morlay, Jean Tissier, Danièle Delorme	Comedy	
The Hell of Lost Pilots	Georges Lampin	Henri Vidal, Michel Auclair, Andrée Debar, Paul Bernard	Adventure drama	
The Heroic Monsieur Boniface	Maurice Labro	Fernandel, Gaston Orbal, Liliane Bert	Comedy	
I Like Only You	Pierre Montazel	Luis Mariano, Martine Carol, Raymond Bussières	Comedy	
I'm the Romance	Gilles Grangier	Georges Guétary, Ginette Leclerc	Musical	
Keep an Eye on Amelia	Claude Autant-Lara	Danielle Darrieux, Jean Desailly, Grégoire Aslan	Comedy	
The King	Marc-Gilbert Sauvajon	Maurice Chevalier, Annie Ducaux, Sophie Desmarets	Comedy	
The Ladies in the Green Hats	Fernand Rivers	Henri Guisol, Marguerite Pierry, Jane Marken	Comedy	
Last Love	Jean Stelli	Annabella, Georges Marchal, Jean Debucourt	Drama	
The Lovers of Verona	André Cayatte	Serge Reggiani, Anouk Aimée, Martine Carol	Mystery romance	

== M-Z ==
Title	Director	Cast	Genre	Notes
Manon	Henri-Georges Clouzot	Cécile Aubry, Michel Auclair, Serge Reggiani	Drama	
The Man on the Eiffel Tower	Burgess Meredith	Charles Laughton, Franchot Tone, Burgess Meredith	Mystery	Co-production with US
Marlene	Pierre de Hérain	Tino Rossi, Micheline Francey, Raymond Bussières	Crime	
The Martyr of Bougival	Jean Loubignac	Jeanne Fusier-Gir, Bach, Line Dariel	Comedy	
Maya	Raymond Bernard	Viviane Romance, Marcel Dalio, Jean-Pierre Grenier	Drama	
Millionaires for One Day	André Hunebelle	Gaby Morlay, Jean Brochard, Ginette Leclerc	Comedy	
Mission in Tangier	André Hunebelle	Raymond Rouleau, Gaby Sylvia, Mila Parély	Thriller	
Monseigneur	Roger Richebé	Fernand Ledoux, Bernard Blier, Nadia Gray	Drama	
My Aunt from Honfleur	René Jayet	Suzanne Dehelly, Jean Parédès, Paulette Dubost	Comedy	
The Mystery of the Yellow Room	Henri Aisner	Serge Reggiani, Hélène Perdrière, Pierre Renoir	Crime	
Night Round	François Campaux	Tilda Thamar, Julien Carette, Noël Roquevert	Crime	
The Nude Woman	André Berthomieu	Yves Vincent, Gisèle Pascal, Jean Tissier	Drama	
The Passenger	Jacques Daroy	Georges Marchal, Dany Robin, Dora Doll	Comedy	
Passion for Life	Jean-Paul Le Chanois	Bernard Blier, Juliette Faber, Édouard Delmont	Comedy drama	
The Perfume of the Lady in Black	Louis Daquin	Hélène Perdrière, Serge Reggiani, Lucien Nat	Crime	
Portrait of an Assassin	Bernard-Roland	Maria Montez, Erich von Stroheim, Arletty	Thriller	
The Pretty Miller Girl	Marcel Pagnol	Tino Rossi, Jacqueline Pagnol, Raoul Marco	Musical	
The Red Angel	Jacques Daniel-Norman	Paul Meurisse, Tilda Thamar, Antonin Berval	Crime	
The Red Signal	Ernst Neubach	Erich von Stroheim, Denise Vernac, Frank Villard	Drama	
Rendezvous in July	Jacques Becker	Daniel Gélin, Brigitte Auber, Nicole Courcel	Comedy	
Return to Life	Georges Lampin, André Cayatte, Henri-Georges Clouzot, Jean Dréville	Louis Jouvet, Serge Reggiani, Patricia Roc	Drama	Portmanteau
Scandal on the Champs-Élysées	Roger Blanc	Pierre Renoir, Françoise Christophe, Guy Decomble	Crime	
The Secret of Mayerling	Jean Delannoy	Jean Marais, Dominique Blanchar, Claude Farell	Historical	
Le Silence de la mer	Jean-Pierre Melville	Howard Vernon, Nicole Stéphane, Ami Aaröe	War drama	
Singoalla	Christian-Jaque	Viveca Lindfors, Michel Auclair, Edvin Adolphson	Romance	Co-production with Sweden
The Sinners	Julien Duvivier	Serge Reggiani, Monique Mélinand, Suzy Prim	Drama	
The Sky Sorcerer	Marcel Blistène	Georges Rollin, Alfred Adam	Historical	
Une si jolie petite plage	Yves Allégret	Gérard Philipe, Madeleine Robinson, Jean Servais	Drama	
Summer Storm	Jean Gehret	Gaby Morlay, Odette Joyeux, Odile Versois	Drama	
Suzanne and the Robbers	Yves Ciampi	René Dary, Suzanne Flon, Pierre Destailles	Comedy	
Thus Finishes the Night	Emil E. Reinert	Anne Vernon, Claude Dauphin, Henri Guisol	Drama	
Toâ	Sacha Guitry	Sacha Guitry, Lana Marconi, Mireille Perrey	Comedy	
Two Doves	Sacha Guitry	Sacha Guitry, Pauline Carton, Lana Marconi	Comedy	
Two Loves	Richard Pottier	Tino Rossi, Simone Valère, Édouard Delmont	Comedy	
Vertigine d'amore	Luigi Capuano	Elli Parvo, Folco Lulli, Charles Vanel	Drama	Co-production with Italy
Vient de paraître	Jacques Houssin	Pierre Fresnay, Blanchette Brunoy, Frank Villard	Drama	
The Voice of Dreams	Jean-Paul Paulin	Renée Saint-Cyr, Jean Chevrier, Marcello Pagliero	Drama	
The Walls of Malapaga	René Clément	Jean Gabin, Isa Miranda, Andrea Checchi	Drama	Co-production with Italy
White Paws	Jean Grémillon	Suzy Delair, Fernand Ledoux, Paul Bernard	Drama	
The White Squadron	René Chanas	Jean Chevrier, René Lefèvre, Michèle Martin	Adventure	
Wicked City	François Villiers	Maria Montez, Jean-Pierre Aumont, Marcel Dalio	Crime	
The Widow and the Innocent	André Cerf	Sophie Desmarets, Jean Desailly, Saturnin Fabre	Comedy	
The Wolf	Guillaume Radot	Claude Génia, Jean Davy, Renaud Mary	Drama	
The Wreck	Willy Rozier	André Le Gall, Françoise Arnoul, Aimé Clariond	Drama	

== Short films ==
Title	Director	Cast	Genre	Notes
Jour de fête	Jacques Tati	Jacques Tati	Comedy	Nominated for Golden Lion

== See also ==
- 1949 in France
