= Sergil and the Dictator =

1948 film

- Directed by: Jacques Daroy
- Written by: Jacques Daroy; Jean Rey
- Starring: Paul Meurisse; Liliane Bert; Arlette Merry
- Cinematography: Jean Lehérissey
- Edited by: Gabriel Rongier; Jeanne Rongier
- Music by: Marceau Van Hoorebecke
- Production company: Société Méditerranéenne de Production
- Release date: 13 October 1948
- Running time: 95 minutes
- Country: France
- Language: French

Sergil and the Dictator (French: Sergil et le dictateur) is a 1948 French thriller film directed by Jacques Daroy and starring Paul Meurisse, Liliane Bert and Arlette Merry. It is the sequel to the 1947 hit Inspector Sergil. The final part of the trilogy Sergil Amongst the Girls followed in 1952. Location filming took place around Marseille and at the city's film studios. The film's sets were designed by the art director Gilbert Garcin.

== Synopsis ==
When a foreign dictator visits France, Inspector Sergil is ordered to protect him from his many enemies.

== Cast ==
- Paul Meurisse as L'inspecteur Sergil
- Liliane Bert as Bijou
- Arlette Merry as Dolorès
- Gaby Bruyère as Colette Marly
- Jérôme Goulven as Monnier
- René Blancard as Goujon
- Henri Arius as Ricardo Mendes
- Christiane Sertilange as Maud Gloria
- Jacqueline Huet as La bonne
- Mag-Avril as La logeuse
- Pierre Clarel as Roberillon
- Marcel Vallée as le Patron
- Georges Yvon as Durban
- Paul Préboist
