= Inspector Sergil =

1947 film

- Directed by: Jacques Daroy
- Written by: Jacques Daroy; Jacques Rey (novel)
- Starring: Paul Meurisse; Liliane Bert
- Cinematography: Marcel Lucien
- Edited by: Jeanne Rongier
- Music by: Bruno Coquatrix
- Production companies: ATA; Les Cigales
- Distributed by: Les Films Constellation
- Release date: 15 January 1947
- Running time: 95 minutes
- Country: France
- Language: French

Inspector Sergil (French: Inspecteur Sergil) is a 1947 French crime film directed by Jacques Daroy and starring Paul Meurisse and Liliane Bert. It is set in Marseille. It was a popular success and was followed by two sequels Sergil and the Dictator and Sergil Among the Girls.

The film's sets were designed by the art director Claude Bouxin.

== Cast ==
- Paul Meurisse as Inspecteur Pierre Sergil
- Liliane Bert as Bijou
- André Burgère as Jacques Saugères
- Véra Maxime as Nadège
- Marc Valbel as Stan
- Pierre Clarel as Georges Martel
- Dora Doll as Sandra Grégoriff
- René Blancard as Goujon
- Henri Arius as Le concierge
- Louis Florencie as Le commissaire
- Fransined as Un policier
- Jérôme Goulven as Monnier
- Raymond Loyer as Le commandant
- Victoria Marino as La chanteuse
