= Sergil Amongst the Girls =

1952 film

- Directed by: Jacques Daroy
- Written by: Jacques Rey (novel)
- Produced by: Jacques Daroy; Jean-Loup Pellecuer
- Starring: Paul Meurisse; Claudine Dupuis; Colette Deréal
- Cinematography: Pierre Levent
- Edited by: Jeanne Rongier
- Music by: Marceau Van Hoorebecke; Jean Yatove
- Production companies: Filmonde; Films Paradis
- Distributed by: Filmonde
- Release date: 6 June 1952
- Running time: 94 minutes
- Country: France
- Language: French

Sergil Amongst the Girls (French: Sergil chez les filles) is a 1952 French crime film directed by Jacques Daroy and starring Paul Meurisse, Claudine Dupuis and Colette Deréal.

It is the final part of a trilogy which also included Inspector Sergil (1947) and Sergil and the Dictator (1948).

== Synopsis ==
Following a murder in a brothel in Marseille, Inspector Sergil investigates and finds himself battling a drug-smuggling gang.

== Cast ==
- Paul Meurisse as L'inspecteur Sergil
- Claudine Dupuis as Elisabeth Poirier
- Albert Dinan as L'inspecteur Léon, adjoint de Sergil
- René Sarvil as Gaston Brivaut, commerçant et trafiquant
- Henri Arius as Fernand, le patron de la maison
- Colette Deréal as Mireille Bérichou, dite Bouche-en-cœur, une fille
- Michel Ardan as Mario, un chef de gang
- Annie Hemery as Irène, la patronne de la maison
- Yves Strauss as Le petit garçon des "Grandier"
- Arnaudy
- Ginette Baudin
- Pierre Clarel
- Cécilia Bert
- Colette Mayer
- Perrachia
- Yvonne Clairy
- Jean Daniel
- Raoul Keller
- Koulouris
- Marie Rémi
- Max Mouron
