= The Monocle Laughs =

- Directed by: Georges Lautner
- Written by: Georges Lautner; Jacques Robert; Albert Kantoff; Colonel Rémy (novel)
- Starring: Paul Meurisse; Marcel Dalio; Olivier Despax
- Cinematography: Maurice Fellous
- Edited by: Michelle David
- Music by: Michel Magne
- Production companies: Les Films Marceau; Laetitia Film
- Distributed by: Cocinor
- Release date: 16 September 1964
- Running time: 100 minutes
- Countries: France; Italy
- Language: French

The Monocle Laughs or The Monocle (French: Le monocle rit jaune, Italian:L'ispettore spara a vista) is a 1964 French-Italian comedy thriller film directed by Georges Lautner and starring Paul Meurisse, Marcel Dalio and Olivier Despax. It is the third in a trilogy of films directed by Lautner and starring Meurisse. It is preceded by The Black Monocle (1961) and The Eye of the Monocle (1962).

== Cast ==
- Paul Meurisse as Le commandant Théobald Dromard dit'Le Monocle'
- Marcel Dalio as Elie Mayerfitsky
- Olivier Despax as Frédéric
- Edward Meeks as Major Sidney
- Henri Nassiet as The Colonel
- Pierre Richard as Bergourian
- Michel Duplaix as The Colonel's Assistant
- Renée Saint-Cyr as Madame Hui
- Holley Wong as Inspector Hui
- Cheng-Liang Kwan as Li
- Lily Hong-Kong as Cora
- Robert Dalban as Poussin
- Barbara Steele as Valérie
- Marcel Bernier as The Colonel's Man
- Guy Henry
- Raymond Meunier as The Interviewer
- Lino Ventura as Elie's Client

== Bibliography ==
- Rège, Philippe. Encyclopedia of French Film Directors, Volume 1. Scarecrow Press, 2009.
