= Gaby Bruyère =

French actress, dancer, dramatist and playwright

- Born: Gabrielle Josette Victorine Planche; 3 June 1914; Mende, Lozère
- Died: 30 August 1978 (aged 64); Cannes
- Occupations: Dramatist and playwright

Gaby Bruyère (3 June 1914 - 30 August 1978) was a French actress, dancer, dramatist, and playwright.

== Career ==
=== Films ===
- 1946: Un beau contrat, short film by Jean-Devaivre
- 1946: Symphonies, short film by Jean-Devaivre
- 1946: Les Aventures de Casanova, by Jean Boyer, Les Chevaliers de l'aventure first part: a comedian
- 1947: Le diamant de cent sous by Jacques Daniel-Norman
- 1947: A Cop by Maurice de Canonge as Ginette
- 1947: Par la fenêtre by Gilles Grangier
- 1948: Les Casse Pieds or Parade du temps perdu by Jean Dréville
- 1948: Sergil et le dictateur by Jacques Daroy as Colette Marly
- 1948: Three Boys, One Girl by Maurice Labro as Gilbert's friend
- 1948: Un cas sur mille - short film by Jean-Pierre Feydeau
- 1951: Le Plaisir by Max Ophüls (sketch : Le Masque) as Frimousse
- 1951: La Vérité sur Bébé Donge by Henri Decoin as the girl in the taxi
- 1952: The Long Teeth by Daniel Gélin as Maud
- 1952: When Do You Commit Suicide? by Émile Couzinet
- 1952: Mort en sursis - short film by Jean Perdrix
- 1953: Innocents in Paris by Gordon Parry : Josette

=== Theater ===
- 1948: Champagne, cigarettes et muse, musical by Dominique Nohain, Théâtre Michel
- Pardon Madame by Romain Coolus and André Rivoire
- Le Cyclone by W. Somerset Maugham
- Liberté provisoire by Michel Duran
- L'École des contribuables by Louis Verneuil and Georges Berr
- 1950: Madame est servie by Georges de Wissant and Jean Kolb, Théâtre Daunou
- 1951: Le Rayon des jouets by Jacques Deval, Théâtre de la Madeleine

== Author ==
=== Theatre ===
- 1959: Cloche de mon cœur (musical), directed by Maurice Guillaud
- 1964: Les Cavaleurs, directed by Christian-Gérard, Théâtre de la Potinière
- 1966: Ange pur, directed by Francis Joffo, Théâtre Édouard VII
- 1971: La Maison de Zaza, directed by Robert Manuel, Théâtre des Nouveautés

=== Books ===
- 1954: Mémoires d'une starlett, éditions Calmann-Lévy, (autobiography)
