= Edmond Guiraud =

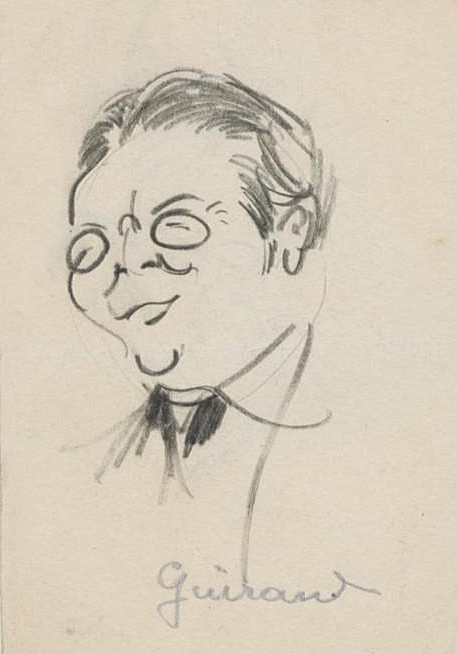
- Caricature by Charles Gir
- Born: 22 March 1879; Marseille, France
- Died: 22 March 1961 (aged 82); Roquedur, France
- Occupations: Playwright, actor

Edmond Guiraud (22 March 1879 – 18 April 1961) was a 20th-century French playwright, librettist, and actor from the Cévennes region in southern France.

== Biographie ==
Edmond Guiraud lived many years in Roquedur in the Gard department. He had a career as a playwright before World War I.

He became a film actor after World War II, and acted in two films by Jean Gehret, shot in the Cévennes.

His widow, Jeannine Guiraud, donated the musée Cévenol in le Vigan the archives of her husband in order to create an "Edmond Guiraud fund".

Edmond Guiraud is buried at the cimetière protestant de Nîmes.

== Libretto ==
- 1912–1914: Marie Victoire, four-act opera by Ottorino Respighi

== Theatre ==
- 1904: L'Ouvrier de la dernière heure
- 1907: Anna Karénine: (after the novel by Leo Tolstoy)
- 1907: Zizi
- 1908: Le Poussin
- 1910: Le Cœur d'Angélique
- 1911: Moïse
- 1911: Marie-Victoire
- 1914 : La Sauvageonne, Théâtre des Bouffes Parisiens, 27 May
- 1922: Vautrin, (after the characters by Honoré de Balzac)
- 1923: Le Bonheur du jour
- 1925: Une femme, four-act comedy, 14 March, Théâtre Fémina
- 1930: Une femme de mon pays
- 1932: Nos 20 ans

in collaboration with Félix Galipaux

- 1905 : La Mémoire des dates

in collaboration with Léon Hennique

- 1929 : Whisky

== Filmography ==
Actor

- 1948: Tabusse by Jean Gehret
- 1948: Le Crime des justes by Jean Gehret
- 1951: Oriental Port by Jacques Daroy

== Film adaptations ==
- 1927: Le Bonheur du jour by Gaston Ravel (piece written in 1923)
- 1935: Zizi by Charles-Félix Tavano - short film -
