= Raboliot (1946 film) =

- Directed by: Jacques Daroy
- Written by: Jacques Daroy; Maurice Genevoix (novel)
- Produced by: Pierre Chichério; Paul Devriès
- Starring: Julien Bertheau; René Blancard; Lise Delamare
- Cinematography: Maurice Barry
- Edited by: Fabienne Tzanck
- Music by: Raymond Gallois-Montbrun
- Production companies: C.G.P. Les Prisonniers Associés
- Distributed by: Pathé Consortium Cinéma
- Release date: 30 January 1946
- Running time: 103 minutes
- Country: France
- Language: French

Raboliot is a 1946 French drama film directed by Jacques Daroy and starring Julien Bertheau, René Blancard and Lise Delamare. It is based on the 1925 novel of the same title by Maurice Genevoix depicting the life of a poacher.

== Cast ==
- Julien Bertheau as Pierre Fouques dit Raboliot
- René Blancard as Le garde-chasse Bourrel
- Lise Delamare as Flora
- Blanchette Brunoy as Sandrine Fouques
- Annie Hémery as Tavie
- Paul Barré
- Pierre Clarel as Sarrelotte
- Jean d'Yd as Touraille
- Marcel Delaître as Volat
- Jean Francel
- Georges Hubert as Un braconnier
- Linette Lemercier as La gamine
- Marthe Mellot
- Albert Montigny
- Robert Moor
- Marcel Pérès as Un paysan
- Alexandre Rignault as Firmin Tournafier
- Jacques Roussel
- Jean Rozenberg
- Maurice Salabert
- Lucien Treffel
- Henri Valbel as Le régisseur Tancogne
- Marco Villa

== Bibliography ==
- Goble, Alan. The Complete Index to Literary Sources in Film. Walter de Gruyter, 1999.
