= Serenade of Texas =

1958 French film

- Directed by: Richard Pottier
- Written by: Jean Ferry; Richard Pottier
- Produced by: Suzanne Goosens
- Starring: Luis Mariano; Bourvil; Germaine Damar
- Cinematography: Lucien Joulin
- Edited by: Lilyane Fattori; Maurice Serein
- Music by: Francis Lopez
- Production company: Jason Films
- Distributed by: Jason Films
- Release date: 17 December 1958
- Running time: 98 minutes
- Country: France
- Language: French

Serenade of Texas (French: Sérénade au Texas) is a 1958 French musical western film, directed by Richard Pottier and starring Luis Mariano, Bourvil and Germaine Damar. In the 1890s, a Frenchman discovers that he has inherited property in a rowdy Texas town.

The film's sets were designed by the art director Rino Mondellini. Shooting took place at the Victorine Studios, in Nice. It was shot in Eastmancolor.

== Cast ==
- Luis Mariano as Jacques Gardel
- Bourvil as Me. Jérôme Quilleboeuf
- Germaine Damar as Rose
- René Blancard as Le shérif
- Robert Rocca as Un fonctionnaire
- Jean Pâqui as Dawson
- Paul Mercey as Bill
- Gil Delamare as Harry
- André Philip as Le commissaire
- Albert Michel as Albert - l'employé du magasin
- Jean-François Martial
- Henri Arius
- Micheline Gary as Denise
- Liliane Bel
- Arlette Poirier as Dolorès
- Yves Deniaud as Roderick
- Les Bluebell Girls as Dancers from the Lido
- Sonja Ziemann as Sylvia
- Miguel Gamy as Clark
- Jacqueline Georges as Dorothy
- Nicole Jonesco as Rita
- Lucien Raimbourg as Ben
- Sylvain as Le garçon

== Bibliography ==
- Hayward, Susan. French Costume Drama of the 1950s: Fashioning Politics in Film. Intellect Books, 2010.
