= The First Man (film) =

2011 film

- Film poster
- Directed by: Gianni Amelio
- Screenplay by: Gianni Amelio
- Based on: Le Premier Homme by Albert Camus
- Starring: Jacques Gamblin; Catherine Sola; Maya Sansa; Denis Podalydès
- Cinematography: Yves Cape
- Music by: Franco Piersanti
- Release dates: 9 September 2011 (TIFF); 20 April 2012 (Italy); 27 March 2013 (France)
- Running time: 100 minutes
- Countries: France; Italy
- Language: French

The First Man (French: Le Premier Homme; Italian: Il primo uomo) is a 2011 French-Italian drama film directed by Gianni Amelio and is based on the novel of the same name by Albert Camus.

== Cast ==
- Jacques Gamblin as Jacques Cormery
- Catherine Sola as Catherine Cormery (1957)
- Maya Sansa as Catherine Cormery (1924)
- Denis Podalydès as Professor Bernard
- Régis Romele as the butcher
- Christophe Dimitri Réveille as Antoine
