= Savage Triangle =

1951 film

- Directed by: Jean Delannoy
- Written by: Edouard Peisson (novel); Jean Delannoy; Henri Jeanson
- Produced by: Joseph Bercholz; Edouard Gide
- Starring: Madeleine Robinson; Frank Villard; Henri Vilbert
- Cinematography: Robert Lefebvre
- Edited by: James Cuenet
- Music by: Paul Misraki
- Production company: Les Films Gibé
- Distributed by: Pathé Consortium Cinéma
- Release date: 26 September 1951
- Running time: 112 minutes
- Country: France
- Language: French

Savage Triangle (French: Le garçon sauvage) is a 1951 French drama film directed by Jean Delannoy and starring Madeleine Robinson, Frank Villard and Henri Vilbert. The film's sets were designed by the art director René Renoux. It was shot partly on location in Marseille where the film is set.

== Synopsis ==
Simon, the twelve-year-old son of Marie, a prostitute, has been brought up in rural Provence in ignorance of his mother's life but now comes to live with her in Marseille. His initial idolisation of her is disillusioned when he discovers the truth, and he hates her lover Paul. Simon comes to dream of going away to sea, and spending time with the sympathetic Captain François.

== Cast ==
- Madeleine Robinson as Marie
- Frank Villard as Paul
- Henri Vilbert as Capitaine François
- Pierre-Michel Beck as Simon - le garcon sauvage
- Nicolas Amato as Le complice
- Henri Arius as Victor - le patron du café
- Edmond Beauchamp as Gilles
- Dora Doll as La blonde amie de Paul
- Georges Douking as Le paysan
- Albert Duvaleix as Le monsieur du taxi
- Fransined asLe coiffeur
- René Génin as Le premier client de Marie
- Janine Miller as Anny Flynn
- Raphaël Patorni as Luccioni
- Fernand Sardou as L'inspecteur

== Bibliography ==
- Goble, Alan. The Complete Index to Literary Sources in Film. Walter de Gruyter, 1999.
