= Vidocq (1939 film) =

1939 French historical crime film

- Directed by: Jacques Daroy
- Written by: Eugène François Vidocq (memoirs); Gilles Dartevelle
- Starring: André Brulé; Nadine Vogel; René Ferté
- Cinematography: Daniel Chacun; Pierre Montazel; Nikolai Toporkoff
- Music by: Marceau Van Hoorebecke
- Production company: Société de Production du Film Vidocq
- Distributed by: Les Films Agiman
- Release date: 18 March 1939
- Running time: 105 minutes
- Country: France
- Language: French

Vidocq is a 1939 French historical crime film directed by Jacques Daroy and starring André Brulé, Nadine Vogel and René Ferté. The film is based on the memoirs of Eugène François Vidocq. Vidocq was a criminal in nineteenth century Paris who changed sides and became a leading detective. Illustrations created by Gaston Hoffman.

== Cast ==
- André Brulé as Vidocq
- Nadine Vogel as Annette
- René Ferté as Salembier
- Jean Worms as Henry, the prefect of police
- Henri Bosc as Chevalier
- Maurice Lagrenée as Saint-Germain
- Rognoni
- Alexandre Mihalesco
- Georges Paulais
- Jeanne Lion
- Clary Monthal
- Monette Dinay
- Nina Rossi
- Colette Desbruyères
- Roger Legris
- Anthony Gildès
- Pierre Clarel as Un bagnard
- Paul Demange
- Daniel Clérice
- Max Dalban
- Pierre Darmant
- Léon Peltier
- Pierre de Ramey
- Teddy Michaud
- Robert Ralphy
- Bruno Clair
- Jean Brochard as Fanfan, the repentant criminal
- Eliane Pascal as Adèle
- Jean Bouzanquet
- Paul Faivre
- Renée Guerin
- Marcel Pérès
- Léon Roger-Maxime

== See also ==
- A Scandal in Paris (1946)
- Vidocq (2001)
- The Emperor of Paris (2018)

== Bibliography ==
- Crisp, C.G. The Classic French Cinema, 1930-1960. Indiana University Press, 1993.
