= The Convict (1951 film) =

1951 film

- Directed by: Willy Rozier
- Written by: Willy Rozier
- Produced by: Willy Rozier
- Starring: Lucien Nat; Lili Bontemps; Juliette Faber
- Cinematography: Fred Langenfeld; Michel Rocca
- Edited by: Denise Charvein
- Music by: Jean Yatove
- Production company: Sport-Films
- Distributed by: Astoria Films
- Release date: 7 March 1951
- Running time: 96 minutes
- Country: France
- Language: French

The Convict (French: Le bagnard) is a 1951 French drama film directed by Willy Rozier and starring Lucien Nat, Lili Bontemps and Juliette Faber. It was shot at the Victorine Studios in Nice and on location around Marseille and in French Guiana.

== Synopsis ==
A doctor from Marseille is convicted of murder and sent to a penal colony in South America. He escapes and finds refuge with a local community.

== Cast ==
- Pierre Gay as Le docteur Julien
- Lucien Nat as Messner
- Lili Bontemps as Marie-Lou
- Henri Arius as Le voisin
- Roger Blin as Un bagnard
- Juliette Faber as Pilar
- Lucien Callamand as Maître Gloriette
- Daniel Mendaille as Le chef de la plantation
- Henry Houry as L'avocat de la défense
- Milly Mathis as Mme Rosano
- Georges Sellier as Le professeur Elie Dubois - un médecin
- Anna Berrecci as Anna
- André Wasley as Un bagnard
- Colette Deréal as Emma
- Jenny Hélia as La femme hilare
- Marco Villa as Ratichon
- Marthe Marty as La mère d'Emma
- Max Amyl as L'accordéoniste

== Bibliography ==
- Rège, Philippe. Encyclopedia of French Film Directors, Volume 1. Scarecrow Press, 2009.
