= Marceau Van Hoorebecke =

French composer

- Born: 13 January 1900; Lille, France
- Died: 7 February 1957 (aged 57); Paris, France
- Occupation: Composer
- Years active: 1932-1954 (film)

Marceau Van Hoorebecke (1900-1957) was a French composer and conductor of film scores.

== Selected filmography ==
- William Tell (1934)
- Ramuntcho (1938)
- The New Rich (1938)
- Vidocq (1939)
- Sacred Woods (1939)
- Three from St Cyr (1939)
- The Master Valet (1941)
- The Secret of Madame Clapain (1943)
- The Wolf of the Malveneurs (1943)
- Blondine (1945)
- Sergil and the Dictator (1948)
- Forbidden to the Public (1949)
- The Martyr of Bougival (1949)
- The Passenger (1949)
- Oriental Port (1950)
- Extravagant Theodora (1950)
- Shot at Dawn (1950)
- Captain Ardant (1951)
- Casabianca (1951)
- Sergil Amongst the Girls (1952)
- The Red Head (1952)
- Domenica (1952)
- My Childish Father (1953)

== Bibliography ==
- Soister, John T. Conrad Veidt on Screen: A Comprehensive Illustrated Filmography. McFarland, 2002.
