= Dora Doll =

French actress (1922–2015)

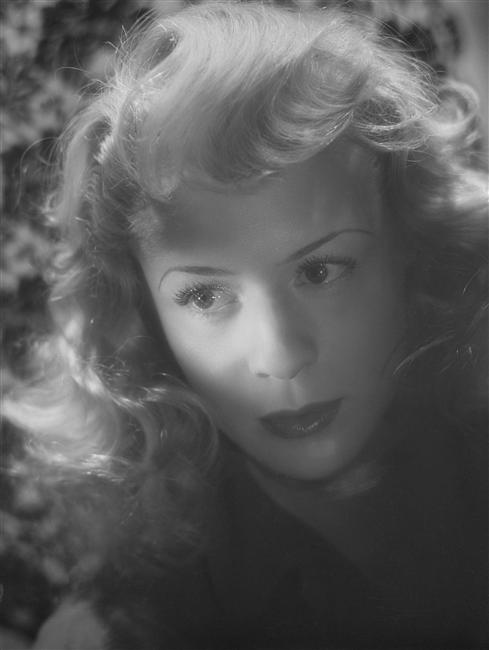
- Born: Dorothea Hermina Feinberg; 19 May 1922; Berlin, Germany
- Died: 15 November 2015 (aged 93); Gard, France
- Occupation: Actress
- Years active: 1950–2006
- Spouses: Raymond Pellegrin (m. 1949; div. 1955); François Deguelt (m. 1965; div. 1971)
- Children: 1

Dora Doll (born Dorothea Hermina Feinberg; 19 May 1922 – 15 November 2015) was a French actress.

== Career ==
Dora Doll, the daughter of a Russian-Jewish banker who was expelled after the 1917 Revolution, was born in Berlin in 1922. She came to France at the end of the 1930s and aspired to become an actress. She already spoke Russian and German and soon learned French, then Italian and English. She enrolled as an auditor at the Conservatoire in the course taught by Louis Jouvet who took a liking to her and chaperoned her stage debut.

One of her first screen appearances was as Juliette in Henri-Georges Clouzot's Manon (1949). She appeared as Lola in Jacques Becker's Touchez pas au grisbi (1954) and as Genisse in Jean Renoir's French Cancan (1955).

In 1976, she appeared on television in the French series Hôtel Baltimore in the role of Suzy. In 1977, she appeared in Fred Zinnemann's Julia as the woman passenger accompanying Lillian Hellman (Jane Fonda) when Lily smuggled $50,000 through Nazi Germany for her friend Julia (Vanessa Redgrave). In 1982, she played in Ettore Scola's That Night in Varennes. In the late 1990s, she played the grandmother Louise Chantreuil in the TV series Tide of Life.

== Personal life ==
She was married twice. Her first husband was the actor Raymond Pellegrin, with whom she had a daughter, Danielle. She was later married to François Deguelt.

In 1993, Dora Doll was awarded the Prix "Reconnaissance des cinéphiles" from Puget-Théniers in honour of her life's work. She was made Knight of France's National Order of Merit in 2000.

Dora Doll died on 15 November 2015 at her home in Gard, France, at the age of 93.

== Selected filmography ==
- Beating Heart (1940)
- Night in December (1940)
- Devil and the Angel (1946)
- Inspector Sergil (1949)
- The Passenger (1949)
- A Man Walks in the City (1950)
- Bed for Two; Rendezvous with Luck (1950)
- The Red Rose (1951)
- The Passerby (1951)
- The Lady from Boston (1951)
- Savage Triangle (1951)
- Dans la vie tout s'arrange (1952)
- Monsieur Scrupule, Gangster (1953)
- The Other Side of Paradise (1953)
- Les Impures (1954)
- Yours Truly, Blake (1954)
- The Lost Girl (1954)
- The Little Rebels (1955)
- The Hotshot (1955)
- Sophie and the Crime (1955)
- Scandal in Montmartre (1955)
- Calle Mayor (1956)
- Tides of Passion (1956)
- Elena and Her Men (1956)
- Suspicion (1956)
- Mademoiselle Strip-tease (1957)
- The Young Lions (1958)
- The Enigma of the Folies-Bergere (1959)
- 125 Rue Montmartre (1959)
- Queen of the Tabarin Club (1960)
- Cocagne (1961)
- First Criminal Brigade (1962)
- Any Number Can Win (1963)
- Une souris chez les hommes (1964)
- Boomerang (1976)
- Black and White in Color (1976)
- Julia (1977)
- Women in Cellblock 9 (1978)
- Julien Fontanes, magistrat (1983)
- Les Keufs (1987)
- Once More (1988)
- Tide of Life (1998–2000)
- Most Promising Young Actress (2000)
- Hey Good Looking! (2006)
