= Lili Bontemps =

French singer and actress

- Born: 9 January 1921; Gastes, Landes, France
- Died: 27 January 1979 (Aged 58); Le Bouscat, Gironde, France
- Occupations: Actress, Singer, Model
- Years active: 1951–1968 (film)

Lili Bontemps (1921–1979) was a French actress and singer. She played a number of sex symbol roles in postwar French cinema and also posed as a pin-up.

== Selected filmography ==
- The Convict (1951)
- The Darling of His Concierge (1951)
- Au diable la vertu (1953)
- Naked in the Wind (1953)
- Love at Sea (1964)

== Bibliography ==
- Ogrizek, Doré. Paris. McGraw-Hill, 1955.
- Schmid, Marion. Intermedial Dialogues: The French New Wave and the Other Arts. Edinburgh University Press, 2019.
