= Captain Ardant =

1951 film

- Directed by: André Zwoboda
- Written by: Pierre Nord (novel); André Zwoboda
- Starring: Yves Vincent; Renée Saint-Cyr; Jean Danet
- Cinematography: Louis Joulin
- Edited by: Gabriel Rongier
- Music by: Marceau Van Hoorebecke
- Production company: Société Nouvelle des Films Dispa
- Distributed by: Société Nouvelle des Films Dispa
- Release date: 15 November 1951
- Running time: 92 minutes
- Country: France
- Language: French

Captain Ardant (French: Capitaine Ardant) is a 1951 French spy film directed by André Zwoboda and starring Yves Vincent, Renée Saint-Cyr and Jean Danet. It is an adaptation of the 1938 novel Captain Ardant by Pierre Nord. There had been several previous attempts to film the novel, but none had been completed.

== Cast ==
- Yves Vincent as Le capitaine Pierre Ardant
- Renée Saint-Cyr as Maria del Fuego
- Jean Danet as Idjilla
- Roland Toutain as Lionel Mancelle
- Raymond Cordy as Jules
- Guy Decomble as Jossip
- Robert Hébert as Barberousse
- Robert Lussac as Le caïd Si Kébir
- Gilles Quéant as Duval
- Thomy Bourdelle as Le colonel
- Georges Lautner as Un militaire
- Caroline Lautner as Leila
- André Zwoboda as L'homme qui conduit la carriole
- Serge Bourguignon as Un militaire
- Louis Lalanne

== Bibliography ==
- Rège, Philippe. Encyclopedia of French Film Directors, Volume 1. Scarecrow Press, 2009.
