= Claude Bouxin =

French art director

- Born: 17 February 1907; Argelès-Gazost, France
- Died: 23 February 1997 (aged 90); Villejuif, France
- Occupation: Art director
- Years active: 1930–1964 (film)

Claude Bouxin (17 February 1907 – 23 February 1997) was a French art director. He designed the film sets for over ninety productions.

== Selected filmography ==
- Roger la Honte (1933)
- Crainquebille (1934)
- The Lady of Lebanon (1934)
- Fanatisme (1934)
- Paris (1937)
- The Drunkard (1937)
- Liberty (1938)
- Prince of My Heart (1938)
- Storm Over Asia (1938)
- Prince Bouboule (1939)
- Case of Conscience (1939)
- Thérèse Martin (1939)
- Facing Destiny (1940)
- The Last Metro (1945)
- Special Mission (1946)
- Rumours (1947)
- Inspector Sergil (1947)
- The Tragic Dolmen (1948)
- The Dancer of Marrakesh (1949)
- Passion for Life (1949)
- Extravagant Theodora (1950)
- The Billionaire Tramp (1951)
- Sins of Madeleine (1951)
- My Wife, My Cow and Me (1952)
- The Nude Dancer (1952)
- The Agony of the Eagles (1952)
- Double or Quits (1953)
- Sins of Paris (1953)
- Operation Thunder (1954)
- Montmartre Nights (1955)
- Three Sailors (1957)
- Let's Be Daring, Madame (1957)
- The Night of Suspects (1960)

== Bibliography ==
- John T. Soister. Conrad Veidt on Screen: A Comprehensive Illustrated Filmography. McFarland, 2002.
