= The Black Monocle =

1961 film

- Directed by: Georges Lautner
- Written by: Pierre Laroche; Jacques Robert; Colonel Rémy (novel)
- Produced by: Lucien Viard
- Starring: Paul Meurisse; Elga Andersen; Bernard Blier
- Cinematography: Maurice Fellous
- Edited by: Michelle David
- Music by: Jean Yatove
- Production company: Orex Films
- Distributed by: Pathé Consortium Cinéma
- Release date: 29 August 1961
- Running time: 88 minutes
- Country: France
- Language: French

The Black Monocle (French: Le monocle noir) is a 1961 French comedy crime film directed by Georges Lautner and starring Paul Meurisse, Elga Andersen and Bernard Blier. It was followed by two sequels The Eye of the Monocle (1962) and The Monocle Laughs (1964).

== Cast ==
- Paul Meurisse as Le commandant Théobald Dromard dit 'Le Monocle'
- Elga Andersen as Martha
- Bernard Blier as Commissaire Tournmire
- Pierre Blanchar as le marquis de Villemaur
- Jacques Marin as Trochu
- Jacques Dufilho as Charvet, le guide
- Albert Rémy as Mérignac - le bibliothécaire
- Nico Pepe as Brozzi
- Raymond Meunier as Raymond
- Raoul Saint-Yves as Jean
- Catherine Sola as Monique
- Marie Dubois as Bénédicte de Villemaur
- Gérard Buhr as Heinrich
- Lutz Gabor as Mathias
- Alain Bouvette as Un inspecteur
- Jean Sylvère as Un inspecteur

== Bibliography ==
- Rège, Philippe. Encyclopedia of French Film Directors, Volume 1. Scarecrow Press, 2009.
