= Naked in the Wind =

1953 film

- Belgian poster
- Directed by: Henri Lepage
- Written by: Henri Lepage; Jacques de Bénac
- Produced by: Michel d'Olivier
- Starring: Félix Oudart; Lili Bontemps; Armand Bernard; Jane Sourza
- Cinematography: Enzo Riccioni
- Edited by: Marity Cléris
- Music by: Guy Lafarge
- Production company: Carmina Films
- Distributed by: Jeannic Films
- Release date: 29 April 1953
- Running time: 95 minutes
- Country: France
- Language: French

Naked in the Wind or The Island of Nude Women (French: L'île aux femmes nues) is a 1953 French comedy film directed by Henri Lepage and starring Félix Oudart, Lili Bontemps, Armand Bernard and Jane Sourza. In 1962 it was released in America in a dubbed version and marketed as an exploitation film. It was shot on location at the naturist resort on Levant Island on the French Riviera.

== Synopsis ==
During an election in a small town in Provence, one of the candidates seeks to discredit his rival the local confectioner Antonin Lespinasse. He has him seduced by the nightclub singer Mademoiselle Pataflan who then lures him to a nudist camp, where incriminating photographs are taken of him. However he finds joy in the community and is soon elected as its president.

== Cast ==
- Félix Oudart as Antonin Lespinasse
- Lili Bontemps as Mademoiselle Pataflan
- Armand Bernard as Théophase Darcepoil
- Jane Sourza as Madame Lespinasse
- Jean Tissier as Professeur Martifole
- Antonin Berval as Farigoule
- Alice Tissot as Madame Darcepoil
- Henri Arius as L'aubergiste
- Jacques Ciron as Hyacinthe
- Michel Flamme as Alain
- Fransined as Marco
- Jim Gérald as Oscar le borgne
- Saint-Granier as Le patron du cabaret
- Sylvain as Le commissaire
- Nicole Besnard
- Lolita Lopez
- Pierre Naugier
- Nicole Regnault

== Bibliography ==
- Rège, Philippe. Encyclopedia of French Film Directors, Volume 1. Scarecrow Press, 2009.
- Krzywinska, Tanya. Sex and the Cinema. Wallflower, 2006.
