= Stopover in Orly =

1955 film

- Directed by: Jean Dréville
- Written by: Paul Andréota; Jacques Companéez; Joseph Than
- Based on: Stopover in Orly by Curt Riess
- Produced by: Jean Darvey; Jean Dréville; Alkexander Grüter; Max Koslowski; Alexandre Lourié; Ray Ventura
- Starring: Dany Robin; Dieter Borsche; Simone Renant; Heinz Rühmann
- Cinematography: Helmut Ashley
- Edited by: Eva Kroll; Gabriel Rongier
- Music by: Paul Misraki
- Production companies: Corona Filmproduktion; Hoche Productions; Marina Films
- Release date: 4 March 1955
- Running time: 105 minutes
- Countries: France; West Germany
- Language: French

Stopover in Orly (French: Escale à Orly, German: Zwischenlandung in Paris) is a 1955 French-West German romantic comedy crime film directed by Jean Dréville and starring Dany Robin, Dieter Borsche, Simone Renant and Heinz Rühmann. It was shot at the Bendestorf Studios near Hamburg and the Victorine Studios in Nice. The film's sets were designed by the art director Robert Giordani. Location shooting took place at Orly Airport, then the main airport for Paris.

== Synopsis ==
Michèle, an employee at the airport, is in love with American pilot Eddie Miller who regularly flies the route from New York to Paris, but problems arise when he is transferred to the Tokyo route. Meanwhile, Michèle's uncle Albert who works in the freight department sets out to tackle a drug trafficking outfit.

== Cast ==
- Dany Robin as Michèle Tellier dite 'Baby Face'
- Dieter Borsche as Eddie Miller
- Simone Renant as Gloria Morena
- Heinz Rühmann as Albert Petit
- François Périer as Pierre Brissac
- Micheline Gary as Geneviève
- Véronique Deschamps as Denise
- Gisela von Collande as Emma Petit
- Marina Than as Jenny
- Doris Kirchner as Arlette - la secrétaire de Boreau
- René Blancard as Martin - le directeur d'Air France
- Georges Lannes as Le commissaire Ludo
- Hans Nielsen as Eugène Boreau
- Roger Tréville as Douglas Moore
- Nicolas Amato as Un douanier
- Jacques Duby as Le scénariste
- Lucien Callamand as Un employé
- Louis Velle as Le pilote italien
- Claus Biederstaedt as Jim
- Reinhard Kolldehoff as Joseph
- Lucien Guervil as Un inspecteur
- Charles Bayard as Un voyageur
- René Havard as André
- Hubert Deschamps as Un douanier
- Hans Richter as Fred
- Holger Hagen as Steve

== Bibliography ==
- Bergfelder, Tim. International Adventures: German Popular Cinema and European Co-Productions in the 1960s. Berghahn Books, 2005.
- Körner, Torsten. Ein guter Freund: Heinz Rühmann. Biographie. Aufbau Digital, 2019.
