= Jean Yatove =

French composer

- Born: 7 May 1903; Fondettes, Indre-et-Loire, France
- Died: 28 June 1978 (aged 75); Boulogne-Billancourt, Hauts-de-Seine, France
- Occupation: Composer
- Years active: 1933–1976 (film)

Jean Yatove (1903–1978) was a French composer known for his film scores. He collaborated on a number of occasions with the director Willy Rozier between 1934 and 1976.

== Selected filmography ==
- The Heir of the Bal Tabarin (1933)
- William Tell (1934)
- Little One (1935)
- Bach the Detective (1936)
- The Dark Angels (1937)
- The Secrets of the Red Sea (1937)
- Men of Prey (1937)
- Champions of France (1938)
- Hopes (1941)
- White Patrol (1942)
- Monsieur Grégoire Escapes (1946)
- Solita de Cordoue (1946)
- Jour de fete (1947)
- 56 Rue Pigalle (1949)
- The Wreck (1949)
- Oriental Port (1950)
- Extravagant Theodora (1950)
- The Adventurers of the Air (1950)
- Moumou (1951)
- The Convict (1951)
- Manina, the Girl in the Bikini (1952)
- Sergil Amongst the Girls (1952)
- The Damned Lovers (1952)
- The Adventurer of Chad (1953)
- Quintuplets in the Boarding School (1953)
- My Childish Father (1953)
- Adam Is Eve (1954)
- Your Turn, Callaghan (1955)
- More Whiskey for Callaghan (1955)
- Le désordre et la nuit (1958)
- Not Delivered (1958)
- Marie-Octobre (1959)
- 125 Rue Montmartre (1959)
- The Gigolo (1960)
- Boulevard (1960)
- The Black Monocle (1961)
- The Seventh Juror (1962)
- The Eye of the Monocle (1962)

== Bibliography ==
- Chion, Michel & Vinas, Monique . The Films of Jacques Tati. Guernica, 1997.
- Crisp, Colin. French Cinema—A Critical Filmography: Volume 2, 1940–1958. Indiana University Press, 2015.
- Dutton, Julian. Keeping Quiet: Visual Comedy in the Age of Sound. Andrews UK Limited, 2015.
