= Marie Victoire =

Opera by Ottorino Respighi

- Opera by Ottorino Respighi
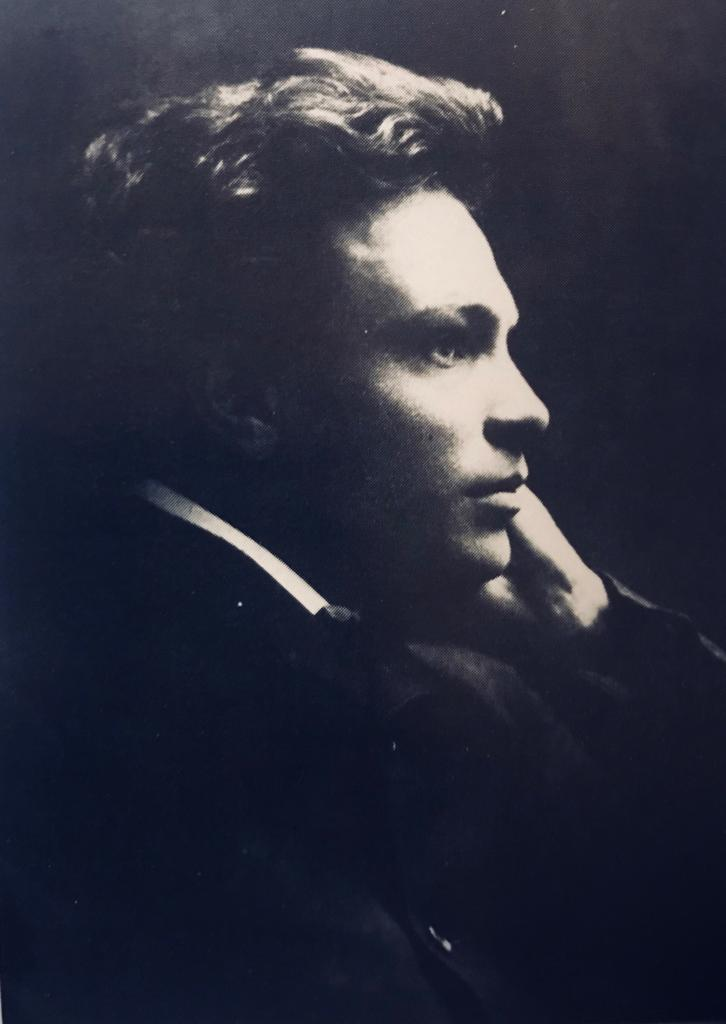
- Respighi in 1912
- Librettist: Edmond Guiraud
- Language: French
- Based on: Guiraud's play
- Premiere: 27 January 2004; Teatro dell'Opera, Rome

Marie Victoire (1912–1914, première 2004) is a French-language opera in four acts by the composer Ottorino Respighi to a libretto by Edmond Guiraud (1879–1961) based on his French-language play of the same name, set in the French Revolution.

This opera was composed between 1912 and 1914 but, in spite of various plans, was not performed during the life of Respighi, due to the outbreak of World War I but also to the hostility towards the work of the wife of the composer, Elsa.

It was premiered on 27 January 2004 at the Teatro dell'Opera in Rome.

Marie Victoire is an opera with a large number of characters, distinguished for the «frequent recourse to direct citations of revolutionary songs and court dances» and for a «vocal style that associates to the classical lyric singing the declamation and the arioso without veristic excesses».

== Roles ==
Roles, voice types, premiere cast
Role	Voice type	Premiere cast, 27 January 2004 Conductor: Gianluigi Gelmetti
Marie Victoire de Lanjallay	soprano	Nelly Miricioiu
Maurice de Lanjallay	baritone	Alberto Gazales
Le Chevalier Clorivière	tenor	Alberto Cupido
Cloteau	bass	Giorgio Surian
Kermarec	baritone	
Simon	baritone	
Lison Fleuriot	soprano	
Caracalla	tenore	
La Marquise de Langlade	mezzo-soprano	
Le Marquis de Langlade	tenore	
La Novice	soprano	
Du Fulgoët	bass	
Le Marquis de Grandchamp	baritone	
Le Vicomte	baritone	
Le Chevalier	baritone	
L’Abbé	tenore	
Le Commissaire	bass	
Emérantine	mezzo-soprano	
Monsieur Pasques	baritone	
Chorus (s,a,t,b)

== Instrumentation ==
Marie Victoire is scored for the following instruments:

piccolo, 2 flutes, 2 oboes, English horn, 2 clarinets, bass clarinet, bassoons, horns, trumpets, trombones, tam-tam, timpani, harp, bell, strings.

== Synopsis ==
Place: France
Time: From 1793 to 1800

=== Act 1 ===
It is the first year of the French First Republic.

Marie and Maurice de Lanjallay live in their castle in Louvenciennes. In France the Republic has been established and the aristocracy is constantly under threat. Clorivière tells Maurice that his father is in danger and that he has to leave for Brittany. After Maurice's departure, Clorivière is captured by the revolutionaries.

=== Act 2 ===
It is 9 Thermidor, in the second year of the Republic (27 July 1794). The scene is the chapel of a convent transformed into a prison during the revolution.

Marie and Clorivière are among the many prisoners; the prison guard is Cloteau, former servant of Marie. The prisoners are told that they have been sentenced to death. Clorivière reminds Marie of the times when, a long time ago, he declared his love for her. Suddenly comes the news that Robespierre is dead: the life of the prisoners is unexpectedly spared.

=== Act 3 ===
It is 3 Nivôse, in the ninth year of the Republic (24 December 1800). The scene is the back room of a fashion shop.

Maurice, convinced that Marie was dead, has fled to America. Clorivière abused Marie, who has never stopped thinking of her husband and now lives in poverty with a five-year-old child, Georges. Marie, abandoned by Clorivière, lives with Cloteau, whom she has forgiven. Clorivière intends to leave France forever and comes to see his son for the last time. At the same time arrives Maurice who, back in France, finds Marie. He learns that she has a son from Clorivière, precisely at the moment when Clorivière breaks in, pursued by the police since he is accused of making an attempt on Napoleon's life. In the confusion Maurice is arrested and, convinced that Marie betrayed him, does not even try to escape.

=== Act 4 ===
Night session in a room of the Criminal Court of the Seine.

Marie begs Maurice to defend himself and confesses to have been raped. Maurice, pressed by the audience which listened to the story, forgives Marie, but refuses to reveal who is the real assaulter. Clorivière accuses himself then seizes a pistol and takes his own life, singing the same song, disliked by the revolutionaries, that Marie sang at the beginning of the opera.

== Recordings ==
2009: Michail Jurowski, Deutsche Oper Berlin Orchestra and Chorus, CD cpo Cat. 777 121-2 (published 2012)

Marie: Takesha Meshé Kizart
Maurice: Markus Brück

Clorivière: Germán Villar
Simon: Simon Pauly
Cloteau: Stephen Bronk
