= René Blancard =

French actor (1897–1965)

- Born: 12 March 1897; Paris, France
- Died: 5 November 1965 (aged 68); Paris, France
- Occupation: Actor
- Years active: 1922–1965

René Blancard (12 March 1897 – 5 November 1965) was a French film actor. He appeared in 80 films between 1922 and 1965.

== Selected filmography ==
- The Mysteries of Paris (1922) – Bras-Rouge
- Montmartre (1925) – Frédéric Charançon
- La Joueuse d'orgue (1925) – Henri Savane
- Un coup de rouge (1937)
- Beautiful Star (1938) – Le commissaire
- Monsieur Coccinelle (1941) – Presto (uncredited)
- The Chain Breaker (1941) – Ferdinand
- The Murderer Lives at Number 21 (1942) – Picard (uncredited)
- The Honourable Catherine (1943) – L'employé (uncredited)
- Strange Inheritance (1943) – Le directeur du théâtre (uncredited)
- The Exile's Song (1943) – Itchoua
- La Main du diable (1943) – Le chirurgien (uncredited)
- Au Bonheur des Dames (1943) – Colomban
- Les Roquevillard (1943)
- Tornavara (1943) – Gourier
- Mermoz (1943)
- Vautrin (1943) – Coquard (uncredited)
- A Cage of Nightingales (1945) – Monsieur Rachin
- Le dernier sou (1946) – L'avocat général
- Raboliot (1946) – Le garde-chasse Bourrel
- Mensonges (1946) – Joseph – le chauffeur
- Gates of the Night (1946) – Le voisin de palier
- Les gosses mènent l'enquête (1947) – Morgain
- Inspecteur Sergil (1947) – Goujon
- La Dame de Haut-le-Bois (1947) – Le notaire
- Mirror (1947) – Boisrond
- Quai des Orfèvres (1947) – Le commissaire principal de la P.J.
- Danger of Death (1947) – Philippe Chauvieux
- La fleur de l'âge (1947)
- Route sans issue (1948) – André Fournier
- Manù il contrabbandiere (1948) – Brigadiere dei gendarmi
- Le Dessous des cartes (1948) – Le brigadier
- Sergil and the Dictator (1948) – Goujon
- City of Hope (1948) – Le commissaire
- The Spice of Life (1948) – Thomas
- 56 Rue Pigalle (1949) – Lucien Bonnet
- Le Droit de l'enfant (1949) – Le colonel Pérignon
- The Cupid Club (1949) – Turnier
- Le Paradis des pilotes perdus (1949) – Inspecteur Simonet
- The Wreck (1949) – Alexandrini
- Le Grand Rendez-vous (1950) – Commissaire Basquet
- La Marie du port (1950) – Dorchain
- A Certain Mister (1950) – Le commissaire Bellefontaine
- No Pity for Women (1950) – Me Tirgen, l'avocat
- Oriental Port (1950) – Baptiste
- Sous le ciel de Paris (1951) – Le professeur Bertelin
- Rue des Saussaies (1951) – L'inspecteur Martial
- Duel in Dakar (1951) – Doirel, chef du S.R.
- Le Plaisir (1952) – Le maire (segment "La Maison Tellier")
- We Are All Murderers (1952) – Albert Pichon
- Drôle de noce (1952) – Monsieur Victor
- Double or Quits (1953) – Maîtee Albert Chassagne
- Follow That Man (1953) – Dr. Corbier
- Les amours finissent à l'aube (1953) – Jaltex
- Endless Horizons (1953) – René Gaudin
- Monsieur Scrupule, Gangster (1953)
- Tempest in the Flesh (1954) – Le bistro
- The Unfrocked One (1954) – M. Lacassagne
- Quay of Blondes (1954) – Commissaire Brochant
- Adam Is Eve (1954) – M Beaumont
- Women Without Hope (1954) – Le commissaire Denys
- La Reine Margot (1954) – Petit rôle (uncredited)
- Stopover in Orly (1955) – Martin, directeur d'Air France
- Mademoiselle from Paris (1955) – Le père de Micheline
- To Catch a Thief (1955) – Commissaire Lepic (uncredited)
- A Missionary (1955) – Rouhaut
- Vous pigez? (1955) – Clifton
- If Paris Were Told to Us (1956) – Aubineau
- Le Long des trottoirs (1956) – M. Dupré
- Calle Mayor (1956) – Editor
- Miss Catastrophe (1957) – Denys
- The Suspects (1957) – Inspecteur Rentier
- La Polka des menottes (1957) – M. Matheu, le père d'Elisabeth
- Serenade of Texas (1958) – Le shérif
- Le Petit Prof (1959) – M. Boulard
- Le Fric (1959) – L'huissier (uncredited)
- Julie the Redhead (1959) – M. Lavigne, le père d'Édouard
- Secret professionnel (1959) – Delmotte
- Green Harvest (1959) – M. Borelli
- The Truth (1960) – Advocate General
- Jusqu'à plus soif (1962) – Le brigadier Lesourd
- A King Without Distraction (1963) – Le curé
- Passeport diplomatique agent K 8 (1965) – Raddel (final film role)
