= Extravagant Theodora =

1950 film

- Directed by: Henri Lepage
- Written by: Jean de Letraz
- Based on: Extravagant Theodora by Jean de Letraz
- Produced by: Paul Devriès
- Starring: Lucienne Le Marchand; Robert Murzeau; Jacqueline Gauthier
- Cinematography: Pierre Levent
- Edited by: Monique Lacombe
- Music by: Marceau Van Hoorebecke; Jean Yatove
- Production companies: Les Prisonniers Associés; Union Cinématographique Lyonnaise
- Distributed by: Omnium Film
- Release date: 26 April 1950
- Running time: 86 minutes
- Country: France
- Language: French

Extravagant Theodora (French: L'extravagante Théodora) is a 1950 French comedy film directed by Henri Lepage and starring Lucienne Le Marchand, Robert Murzeau and Jacqueline Gauthier. It was based on a play of the same title by Jean de Letraz. The film's sets were designed by the art director Claude Bouxin.

== Cast ==
- Lucienne Le Marchand as Théodora
- Robert Murzeau as Thierry de Villiers
- Jacqueline Gauthier as Brigitte Leprieur
- Pierre Stéphen as Octave Leprieur
- Hélène Bellanger as Nicole, la secrétaire de Thierry
- Lucien Blondeau
- Maurice Schutz

== Bibliography ==
- Goble, Alan. The Complete Index to Literary Sources in Film. Walter de Gruyter, 1999.
- Rège, Philippe. Encyclopedia of French Film Directors, Volume 1. Scarecrow Press, 2009.
