= Mademoiselle from Paris =

1955 French comedy film

- Directed by: Walter Kapps
- Written by: Maurice Griffe
- Produced by: Pierre Chichério
- Starring: Jean-Pierre Aumont; Gisèle Pascal; Nadine Basile
- Cinematography: Armand Thirard
- Edited by: Henri Taverna
- Music by: Paul Durand
- Production company: Pécéfilms
- Distributed by: Jeannic Films
- Release date: 28 June 1955
- Running time: 110 minutes
- Country: France
- Language: French

Mademoiselle from Paris (French: Mademoiselle de Paris) is a 1955 French comedy film directed by Walter Kapps and starring Jean-Pierre Aumont, Gisèle Pascal and Nadine Basile. The film was one of several films set in the work of high fashion made during the decade, popularising the New Look of Christian Dior. It was shot using Eastmancolor. The film's sets were designed by the art director Rino Mondellini.

== Synopsis ==
Micheline works hard to keep the struggling fashion house of her employer, Maurice, afloat. When it goes out of business she accepts an offer to tour the country as an accompanist to the singer Jacqueline François. In Nice she encounters both her sister and Maurice who is now planning to start a new fashion house.

== Cast ==
- Jean-Pierre Aumont as Maurice Darnal
- Gisèle Pascal as Micheline Bertier
- Nadine Basile as Léa Berthier
- Jean Lara as Pierre Rollin
- Raphaël Patorni as Max, le fournisseur
- René Blancard as Le père de Micheline
- Jacqueline François as Herself
- Capucine as Herself
- Claudy Chapeland as Claude Berthier
- Jacqueline Huet as Une collaboratrice
- Raymond Loyer as Max
- Jean Marchat as Hubert
- Henri Arius as L'acteur
- Robert Seller as Le notaire
- Georges Sellier as L'avoué

== Bibliography ==
- Shingler, Martin. Star Studies: A Critical Guide. Bloomsbury Publishing, 2012.
