= Maid in Paris =

1956 film

- Directed by: Pierre Gaspard-Huit
- Written by: Jean Aurel; Jacques Laurent; Annette Wademant
- Produced by: René Bianco
- Starring: Dany Robin; Daniel Gélin; Tilda Thamar
- Cinematography: Jacques Lemare
- Edited by: Louisette Hautecoeur; Denise Natot
- Music by: Georges Van Parys
- Production company: Boréal Films
- Distributed by: Sonofilm
- Release date: 28 March 1956
- Running time: 100 minutes
- Country: France
- Language: French

Maid in Paris (French: Paris canaille) is a 1956 French comedy film directed by Pierre Gaspard-Huit and starring Dany Robin, Daniel Gélin, and Tilda Thamar. The screenplay concerns a young woman from the countryside who visits Paris and falls in love with a police officer there.

The film's sets were designed by the art director Robert Hubert.

== Cast ==
- Dany Robin as Penny Benson
- Daniel Gélin as Antoine du Merlet
- Tilda Thamar as Gloria Benson
- Mary Marquet as Mme. Bernemal
- Marie Daëms as Claude
- Maryse Martin as Germaine
- François Guérin as Jean-Pierre
- Robert Murzeau as Le monsieur fauché
- Micheline Gary as Une pensionnaire
- Michel Etcheverry as Le commissaire des mineurs
- Roger Pierre as Gérard Destremeaux, le gigolo
- Darry Cowl as Daniel, le casseur d'assiettes
- Yoko Tani as Une élève
- Sophie Daumier as Une élève
- Renée Passeur as La dame au gigolo
- Roger Dumas as Un jeune dragueur au jardin
- Jackie Sardou

== Bibliography ==
- Rège, Philippe . Encyclopedia of French Film Directors, Volume 1. Scarecrow Press, 2009.
