= Oriental Port =

1950 film

- Film poster
- Directed by: Jacques Daroy
- Written by: René Roques (novel); Jacques Rey
- Produced by: Paul Ricard
- Starring: Yves Vincent; Tilda Thamar; Nathalie Nattier
- Cinematography: Jean Lehérissey
- Edited by: Jeanne Rongier
- Music by: Marceau Van Hoorebecke; Jean Yatove
- Production company: Protis Films
- Distributed by: Pathé Consortium Cinéma
- Release date: 6 December 1950
- Running time: 100 minutes
- Country: France
- Language: French

Oriental Port (French: Porte d'orient) is a 1950 French crime film directed by Jacques Daroy and starring Yves Vincent, Tilda Thamar and Nathalie Nattier. It is about a group of smugglers operating out of Marseille. It is based on a novel by René Roques. The film was the first French production to be shot using the Belgian Gevacolor process.

== Cast ==
- Yves Vincent as Vaucourt
- Tilda Thamar as Mme. Valnis
- Nathalie Nattier as Arlette
- Marcel Dalio as Zarapoulos
- Antonin Berval as Capitaine Palmade
- René Blancard as Baptiste
- Lucas Gridoux as Le malais
- Henri Arius as Bonail
- Fernand Sardou as Gustave
- René Sarvil as Thomas, un douanier
- Jacqueline Huet as La comtesse
- Annie Hémery as La passagére
- Agnès Laury
- Alfred Goulin
- Fabienne Clery
- Max André
- Louis Viret
- Edmond Guiraud
- Lucie Debret

== Bibliography ==
- Goble, Alan. The Complete Index to Literary Sources in Film. Walter de Gruyter, 1999.
- Hayward, Susan. French Costume Drama of the 1950s: Fashioning Politics in Film. Intellect Books, 2010.
