= Catherine Sola =

French actress (1941–2014)

- Born: 19 January 1941; Saint-Jean-de-Maurienne, France
- Died: 12 September 2014 (aged 73); Périgueux, Dordogne, France
- Occupation: Actress
- Years active: 1961–2011 (film)

Catherine Sola (1941–2014) was a French film and television actress.

== Selected filmography ==
- The Black Monocle (1961)
- The Trip to Biarritz (1963)
- The Counterfeit Constable (1964)
- The Champagne Murders (1967)
- Sweet Movie (1974)
- Joséphine, ange gardien (1998 and 2008; one episode each)
- The First Man (2011)

== General and cited references ==
- Peter Cowie & Derek Elley (1977). World Filmography: 1967. Fairleigh Dickinson University Press.
