= Quay of Blondes =

1954 film

Quai des blondes
- Directed by: Paul Cadéac
- Written by: Michel Audiard; Paul Cadéac; Pierre Foucaud
- Produced by: André Hunebelle
- Starring: Michel Auclair; Barbara Laage; Madeleine Lebeau
- Cinematography: Marcel Grignon
- Edited by: Roger Dwyre
- Music by: Jean Marion
- Production companies: Hunebelle; Pathé Consortium Cinéma
- Distributed by: Pathé Distribution
- Release date: 7 April 1954
- Running time: 85 minutes
- Country: France
- Language: French

Quay of Blondes (French: Quai des blondes) is a 1954 French crime film directed by Paul Cadéac and starring Michel Auclair, Barbara Laage and Madeleine Lebeau. It was produced and distributed by Pathé and shot in Gevacolor. The film's sets were designed by the art director Lucien Carré with costumes by Pierre Balmain. Location shooting took place in French Algeria and Marseille.

== Synopsis ==
A former navy officer is tied up in a smuggling operation between Marseille and Tangier concentrating particularly in lucrative American cigarettes. However his position is threatened by the arrival of a thuggish American gangster who wants to take over the whole market.

== Cast ==
- Michel Auclair as Jacques Fenner
- Barbara Laage as Barbara
- Madeleine Lebeau as Nelly
- Darío Moreno as Lucky
- John Kitzmiller as Michel
- Henri Arius as Le capitaine de 'L'Atlanta'
- Maurice Biraud as Laurent
- Paul Bisciglia as Le chasseur de l'hôtel
- René Blancard as Commissaire Brochant
- Georges Chamarat as Maître Chanu
- Paul Demange as Un client
- Jacques Dynam as Dominique
- Giani Esposito as Un tueur
- Micheline Gary as La secrétaire
- Robert Hossein as Chemise rose
- André Valmy as Marco

== Bibliography ==
- Kermabon, Jacques. Pathé: premier empire du cinéma. Centre Georges Pompidou, 1994.
