= Not Delivered =

1958 film

- Directed by: Gilles Grangier
- Written by: Pierre Véry; Noël Calef; Gilles Grangier
- Based on: Échec au porteur by Noël Calef
- Produced by: Lucien Viard
- Starring: Paul Meurisse; Jeanne Moreau; Serge Reggiani; Gert Fröbe
- Cinematography: Jacques Lemare
- Edited by: Jacqueline Sadoul
- Music by: Jean Yatove
- Production company: Orex Films
- Distributed by: Les Films Corona
- Release date: 15 January 1958
- Running time: 86 minutes
- Country: France
- Language: French

Not Delivered (French: Échec au porteur) is a 1958 French crime thriller film directed by Gilles Grangier and starring Paul Meurisse, Jeanne Moreau, Serge Reggiani and Gert Fröbe. It was shot at the Boulogne Studios in Paris and on location in Brittany. The film's sets were designed by the art director Robert Gys.

== Cast ==
- Paul Meurisse as Le commissaire divisionnaire Varzeilles
- Jeanne Moreau as Jacqueline Tourieu
- Serge Reggiani as Bastien Sassey
- Simone Renant as Denise Giraucourt
- Gert Fröbe as Hans
- Robert Porte as L'inspecteur Detourbe
- Fernand Sardou as Monsieur Arpaillargues
- Bernard Lajarrige as L'inspecteur Le Crocq
- Christian Fourcade as Jules dit Julot
- Frédéric Atger as Bernard Arpaillargues
- Bertrand Borie as Claude Giraucourt
- Amy Colin as Madame Vagues - la concierge
- Hélène Tossy as Madame Arpaillargues
- Fanny Mauve as La dame du terrain vague
- Claude Albers as Hélène
- Marie-Claire Verlène as Thérèse
- Henriette Monfraix as Suzanne
- Louis Arbessier as Le chirurgien Bailleul -
- Lucien Hubert as Truffier
- Albert Dinan as Aldo
- Pierre Jourdan as Marc Giraucourt
- Lucien Raimbourg as L'agent Gramier
- Clément Harari as L'importateur Adrien Osmets
- Robert Lombard as L'inspecteur Planioles
- Charles Bouillaud as L'inspecteur Remaillard
- Pierre Collet as Morigny
- Jo Peignot as L'inspecteur Tréguennec
- Reggie Nalder as Dédé
- Henri Virlojeux as Le portier de l'hôtel

== Bibliography ==
- Rège, Philippe. Encyclopedia of French Film Directors, Volume 1. Scarecrow Press, 2009.
- Segrave, Kerry & Martin, Linda. The Continental Actress: European Film Stars of the Postwar Era—biographies, Criticism, Filmographies, Bibliographies. McFarland, 1990.
