= Rumours (1947 film) =

1947 film

- Directed by: Jacques Daroy
- Written by: Simon Gantillon
- Produced by: Paul Claudon
- Starring: Jacques Dumesnil; Jany Holt; Roger Karl
- Cinematography: Maurice Barry
- Edited by: Madeleine Bagiau
- Music by: Jacques Dupont
- Production companies: C.A.P.A.C. Cosmorama
- Release date: 26 March 1947
- Running time: 90 minutes
- Country: France
- Language: French

Rumours (French: Rumeurs) is a 1947 French crime drama film directed by Jacques Daroy and starring Jacques Dumesnil, Jany Holt and Roger Karl. The film's sets were designed by the art director Claude Bouxin.

== Synopsis ==
In a small town in Provence, the killing of a promiscuous local woman leads to suspicions against the town's garage mechanic. While the police are unable to prove anything against him, the violent rumours that spread around the area begin to drive him out of his mind and he begins to believe he really is murderous.

== Cast ==
- Jacques Dumesnil as Jean
- Jany Holt as Aline
- Roger Karl as Le patron
- Pierre Palau as Le coiffeur
- Annette Poivre as La serveuse
- Henri Arius as Le maire
- Lucien Callamand as Dufour
- Pierre Clarel as Le braconnier
- Fransined as Le garçon de café
- Jérôme Goulven as François
- Serge Grave as Le mécano
- Georges Hubert as Le garagiste
- Annie Hémery as Marthe
- Janine Viénot as Rose

== Bibliography ==
- Barrot, Olivier & Chirat, Raymond. Noir et blanc: 250 acteurs du cinéma français, 1930-1960. Flammarion, 2000. ISBN 978-2-08-067877-5.
