= Double or Quits (1953 film) =

1953 film

- Directed by: Robert Vernay
- Written by: René Wheeler
- Produced by: Michel Lézé
- Starring: Zappy Max; Suzanne Dehelly; Danielle Godet
- Cinematography: Victor Arménise
- Edited by: Hélène Basté
- Music by: Norbert Glanzberg
- Production company: Olympic Films
- Distributed by: Compagnie Commerciale Française Cinématographique
- Release date: 6 February 1953
- Running time: 83 minutes
- Country: France
- Language: French

Double or Quit (French: Quitte ou double) is a 1953 French comedy film directed by Robert Vernay and starring Zappy Max, Suzanne Dehelly and Danielle Godet. It was shot at the Epinay Studios outside Paris. The film's sets were designed by the art director Claude Bouxin. Along with Zappy Pax, it features several performers who had become famous on the Radio Circus show on Radio Luxembourg.

== Synopsis ==
Charlotte, a mature librarian from Bourganeuf in Limousin, is a great admirer of Zappy Max, the host of a popular radio show. She sends him letters, but to impresses him, she also sends him the picture of an attractive young woman, Marie. When Zappy arrives in the city as part of his national tour, Charlotte persuades Marie to take her place in a meeting, and the two fall in love. Meanwhile, Charlotte enters as a contestant in the radio show's double or quit game and wins money.

== Cast ==
- Zappy Max as Zappy Max
- Suzanne Dehelly as Charlotte Nodier
- Danielle Godet as Marie Chassagne
- Jean Tissier as Joly
- René Blancard as Maîtee Albert Chassagne
- Roland Armontel as Chassagne - le père de Marie
- Paul Azaïs as Tonio
- Line Renaud as La chanteuse
- Georgette Anys as Une spectatrice
- France Asselin as La jeune mère de l'enfant malade
- Gaby Basset as Une voisine
- Léon Berton as Le concierge de la mairie
- Thomy Bourdelle as Le chef monteur
- Jean Clarieux as Le chauffeur
- Max Dalban as Le cafetier
- Marcelle Féry as La femme du barbu
- Fernand Gilbert as Un spectateur
- Gérard Lucas as Henri
- René Marc as Un employé de Radio-Luxembourg
- Jacques Marin as Lucien
- Marie Navarre as La servante
- Jean-Marie Serreau as Panard
- Solange Sicard as La paysanne

== Bibliography ==
- Dyer, Richard & Vincendeau, Ginette. Popular European Cinema. Routledge, 2013.
- Rège, Philippe. Encyclopedia of French Film Directors, Volume 1. Scarecrow Press, 2009.
