= Robert Murzeau =

French actor (1909–1990)

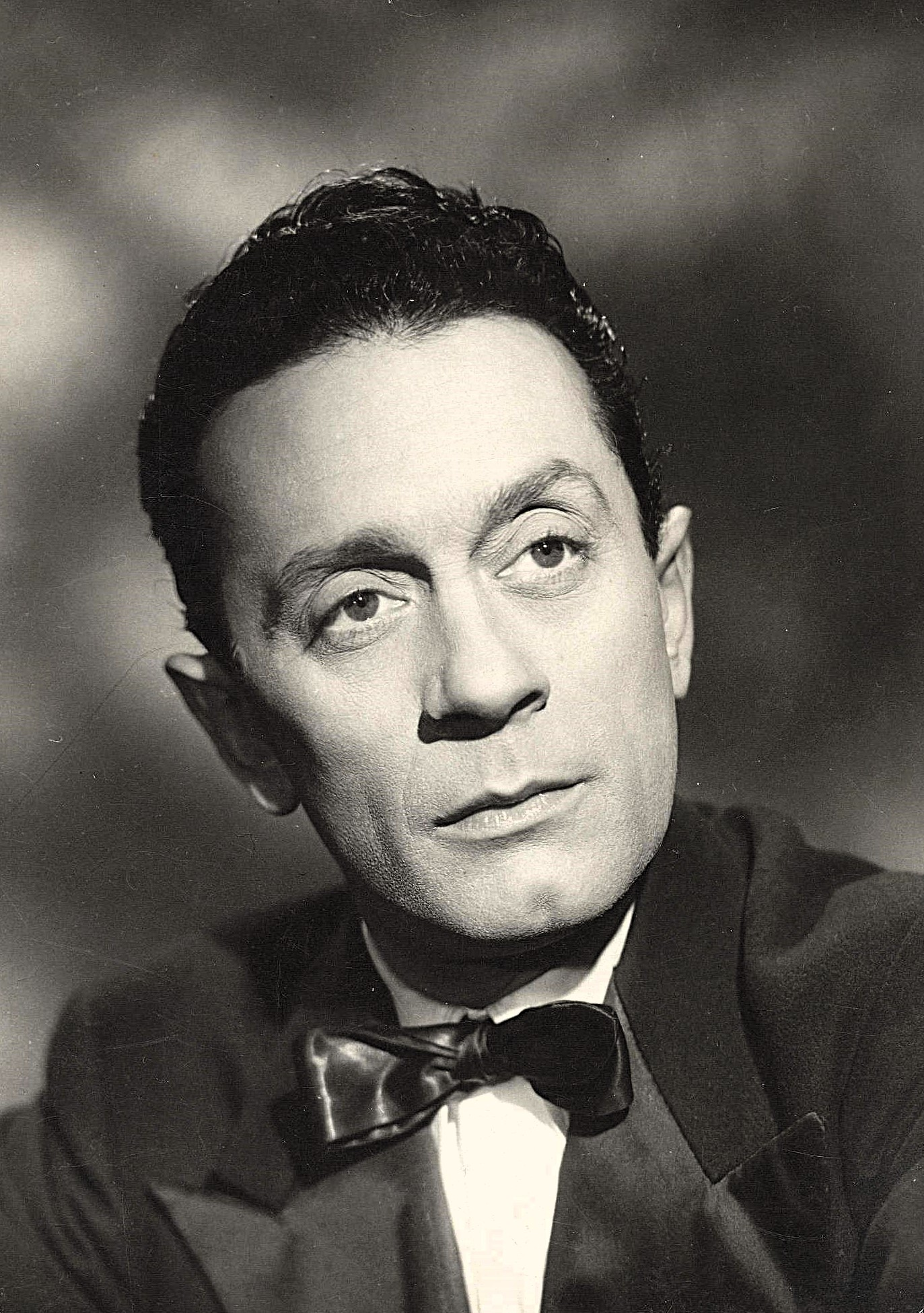
- Born: 20 June 1909; La Rochelle, France
- Died: 8 July 1990 (aged 81); Châteillon, France
- Occupation: Actor
- Years active: 1947–1984 (film & TV)

Robert Murzeau (1909–1990) was a French actor of stage, film and television.

== Selected filmography ==
- Destiny Has Fun (1946)
- The Husbands of Leontine (1947)
- Monsieur Vincent (1947)
- To the Eyes of Memory (1948)
- The King (1949)
- Extravagant Theodora (1950)
- Moumou (1951)
- Atoll K (1951)
- The Lovers of Marianne (1953)
- Madame du Barry (1954)
- Maid in Paris (1956)
- Short Head (1956)

== Bibliography ==
- Goble, Alan. The Complete Index to Literary Sources in Film. Walter de Gruyter, 1999.
