= Le Plaisir =

1952 film by Max Ophüls

- Theatrical release poster
- Directed by: Max Ophüls
- Screenplay by: Jacques Natanson; Max Ophüls
- Story by: Guy de Maupassant
- Produced by: Max Ophüls; M. Kieffer; Édouard Harispuru
- Starring: Claude Dauphin; Jean Galland; Gaby Morlay; Madeleine Renaud; Daniel Gélin; Danielle Darrieux; Simone Simon; Jean Gabin
- Cinematography: Philippe Agostini; Christian Matras
- Edited by: Leonide Azar
- Music by: Joe Hajos; Maurice Yvain
- Distributed by: Columbia Films S.A.
- Release date: 14 February 1952
- Running time: 97 minutes
- Country: France
- Language: French

Le Plaisir (English title, House of Pleasure) is a 1952 French comedy-drama anthology film by German-born film director Max Ophüls (1902–1957) adapting three short stories by Guy de Maupassant — "Le Masque" (1889), "La Maison Tellier" (1881), and "Le Modèle" (1883).

Ophüls was nominated for an Oscar for Best Art Direction. This was the last of Ophüls' two Oscar nominations in his career.

The mask worn by Ambroise in Le Masque was created by Rostislav Doboujinsky and would become one of the costume designer's specialties.

== Plot ==
=== Le Masque ===
A masked young dandy goes to an ornate dance hall, where he finds a young woman to be his dance partner. When he faints from the exertion, a doctor is called. He discovers that the dandy's mask hides his aged appearance. The doctor takes the old man home to his patient wife. She explains that her husband Ambroise used to attract the ladies who frequented the hairdresser salon where he worked, but in the space of two years, he lost his looks. He goes out in disguise in an attempt to recapture his youth.

=== La Maison Tellier ===
Julia Tellier, the well-respected madam of a small-town brothel, takes her girls on an outing to her brother's village to attend the First Communion of her niece. Her regular patrons are taken aback when they discover the brothel closed without explanation that Saturday night. One finally discovers a sign explaining the reason and is relieved. At the village, everyone is very impressed by the group of elegant ladies who have appeared to support the girl at her First Communion. The prostitutes are moved to tears by the ceremony, as is the rest of the congregation. Julia's brother Joseph becomes infatuated with Rosa, one of her workers, and promises to visit next month.

=== Le Modèle ===
A painter falls in love with his model. Things are idyllic at first, but after living together for a while, they begin to quarrel constantly. Finally, he moves in with his friend. She eventually finds him, but he wants no more to do with her. He ignores her threat to jump from a window, and is so guilt-ridden when she does so immediately that he marries her.

== Cast ==
Le Masque

- Claude Dauphin as the doctor
- Gaby Morlay as Denise, Ambroise's wife
- Paul Azaïs as a dance hall patron
- Gaby Bruyère as Frimousse, Ambroise's dance partner
- Jean Galland as Ambroise

La Maison Tellier

- Madeleine Renaud as Julia Tellier
- Ginette Leclerc as Madame Flora, one of Julia's girls
- Mila Parély as Madame Raphaële, another of Julia's employees
- Danielle Darrieux as Madame Rosa, another worker
- Pierre Brasseur as Julien Ledentu, a traveling salesman who becomes too fresh with the girls on the train trip
- Jean Gabin as Joseph Rivet, Julia's brother
- Amédée as Frédéric, another whorehouse employee
- Antoine Balpêtré as Monsieur Poulain, a patron
- René Blancard as the mayor
- Mathilde Casadesus as Madame Louise, another worker
- Henri Crémieux as Monsieur Pimpesse
- Arthur Devère as the train conductor
- Paulette Dubost as Madame Fernande, another employee
- Jocelyne Jany as Constance Rivet, Julia's niece
- Robert Lombard as Monsieur Philippe, the banker's son, a patron
- Héléna Manson as Marie Rivet, Joseph's wife
- Georges Baconnet as Un client de la maison Tellie

Le Modèle

- Jean Servais as Jean's friend, also narrator of the French version
- Daniel Gélin as Jean, the painter
- Simone Simon as Joséphine, the model
