= Olivier Despax =

- Born: 28 February 1939; Neuilly-sur-Seine, Hauts-de-Seine, France
- Died: 10 April 1974 (aged 35); Villejuif, Val-de-Marne, France
- Other name: Olivier Despax de Kerver
- Occupations: Actor, singer

Olivier Despax (born Olivier Despax de Kerver; 28 February 1939 – 10 April 1974) was a French guitarist, singer and film actor.

== Biography ==
The grandnephew of composer Florent Schmitt and the son of Comte Joel de Kerver, Despax began piano lessons at age four and was given a guitar by his parents on his twelfth birthday. He was awarded the Best Jazz Guitarist award in 1955 from the Salon de la Jeunesse du Grand Palais when he was 16 years old.

After military service in the Algerian War he formed a rock group called Olivier Despax and the Gamblers and was signed by Barclay Records.

During a gig at Saint-Tropez, he met Brigitte Bardot whom he taught how to play the guitar. The two appeared together on French television in 1963 singing a duet. The publicity led to a film career in France beginning in 1964 with Mort, où est ta victoire?. He made his English language debut in Dark of the Sun (1968).

Despax was diagnosed with leukemia in 1969 and died in 1974.

== Filmography ==
Year	Title	Role	Notes
1964	Mort, où est ta victoire?	René	
1964	Les Amoureux du France	Olivier Dorante	
1964	The Monocle Laughs	Frédéric	
1966	A nous deux, Paris!	Michel Lamballe	
1966	Et la femme créa l'amour	Laurent Ferrère	
1968	Dark of the Sun	Lt. Surrier	
1968	Cover Girl	Paul	
1976	El avispero		(final film role)

== Bibliography ==
- Goble, Alan. The Complete Index to Literary Sources in Film. Walter de Gruyter, 1999.
