= Gabriel Rongier =

French film editor (1921–1991)

- Born: 30 April 1921; Marseille, Bouches-du-Rhône, France
- Died: 13 August 1991 (aged 70); Clichy-la-Garenne, Hauts-de-Seine, France
- Occupation: Film editor
- Years active: 1947-1982 (film)

Gabriel Rongier (1921–1991) was a French film editor. He worked on over a hundred productions during his career.

== Selected filmography ==
- Sergil and the Dictator (1948)
- Two Doves (1949)
- Toâ (1949)
- The Treasure of Cantenac (1950)
- Shot at Dawn (1950)
- Captain Ardant (1951)
- Good Enough to Eat (1951)
- Village Feud (1951)
- Full House (1952)
- Forbidden Fruit (1952)
- Little Jacques (1953)
- Endless Horizons (1953)
- La Reine Margot (1954)
- Women Without Hope (1954)
- Operation Thunder (1954)
- Stopover in Orly (1955)
- The Babes in the Secret Service (1956)
- Meeting in Paris (1956)
- Patrouille de choc (1957)
- First of May (1958)
- Maxime (1958)
- Checkerboard (1959)
- Auguste (1961)
- Tartarin of Tarascon (1962)
- Jeff Gordon, Secret Agent (1963)
- The Train (1964)
- Ces dames s'en mêlent (1965)
- Your Money or Your Life (1966)
- Le Temps des loups (1970)
- La Part des lions (1971)
- La dernière bourrée à Paris (1973)
- Vortex (1976)

== Bibliography ==
- Andreychuk, Ed. Burt Lancaster: A Filmography and Biography. McFarland, 2005.
- Biggs, Melissa E. French films, 1945-1993: a critical filmography of the 400 most important releases. McFarland & Company, 1996.
