= Endless Horizons =

1953 film

- Film poster
- Directed by: Jean Dréville
- Written by: Raymond Caillava
- Produced by: David Armand Medioni
- Starring: Giselle Pascal; Jean Chevrier; René Blancard
- Cinematography: André Bac
- Edited by: Gabriel Rongier
- Music by: René Cloërec
- Production company: Société Nouvelle des Films Dispa
- Distributed by: Société Nouvelle des Films Dispa
- Release date: 3 July 1953
- Running time: 104 minutes
- Country: France
- Language: French

Endless Horizons (French: Horizons sans fin) is a 1953 French drama film directed by Jean Dréville and starring Giselle Pascal, Jean Chevrier and René Blancard. It was entered into the 1953 Cannes Film Festival. Location shooting took place at the Enghien Moisselles Airfield. The film's sets were designed by the art director Raymond Gabutti.

== Synopsis ==
The film is a biopic of the pioneering French aviator Hélène Boucher who broke a number of woman's flying records before her death in a crash in 1934.

== Cast ==
- Giselle Pascal as Hélène Boucher
- Jean Chevrier as André Danet
- René Blancard as René Gaudin
- Paul Frankeur as Soupape
- Maurice Ronet as Marc Caussade
- Marie-France Planeze as Geneviève Gaudin
- Hubert de Malet as Brunel
- Christiane Barry as Jacqueline
- Jacques Bernard as Pigeon
- Lisette Lebon as Jacquotte
- Pierre Trabaud as Pierre Castel
- Marcel André as Dusmesnil
- Micheline Gary
- Guy Derlan as Fougères
- François Joux as 1er actionnaire
- Marcel Josz as 2ème actionnaire

== Bibliography ==
- Bessy, Maurice; Chirat, Raymond. Histoire du cinéma français: 1951-1955. Pygmalion, 1989.
