= Yvonne Ménard =

French burlesque performer (1929–2013)

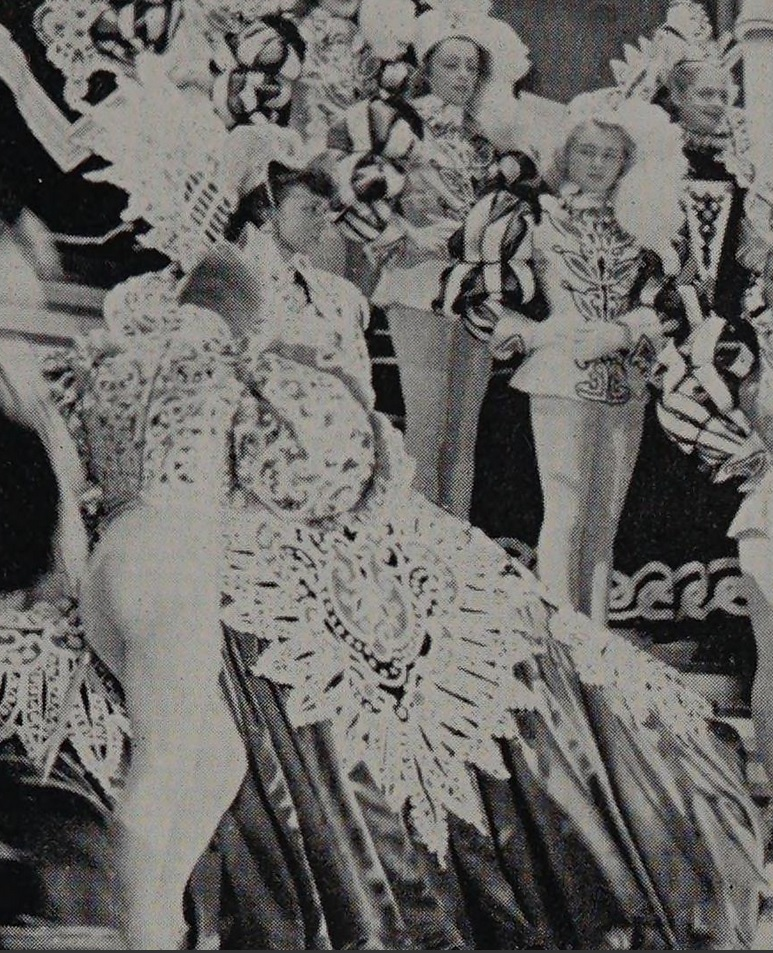
- Yvonne Ménard performing in Lucrece Borgia for the crew of the USS Midway (CV-41) at the Folies-Bergère in 1952.
- Born: Yvonne Marie Louise Odette Renée Ménard; 26 October 1929; Chelun, Ille-et-Vilaine, French Third Republic
- Died: 5 January 2013 (aged 83); Pléchâtel, Ille-et-Vilaine, France
- Occupation: burlesque dancer
- Spouse: Michel Wagner

Yvonne Marie Louise Odette Renée Ménard (26 October 1929 – 5 January 2013) was a French burlesque dancer. She was known for her roles at the Folies Bergère (both the theatre and in the film) in shows such as Une Vraie Folie, in films such as Les nuits de Paris [Fr], as well as for being the cover model of Playboy's third issue in February 1954. She is listed in the brief description of the Folies Bergère theatre in the 28th and 29th editions of Bienvenue à Paris.

== Career ==
Yvonne Ménard was born in Chelun, France October 26, 1929 to a Parisian baker. During World War II, to supplement her family's income, she sold flashlights and candy on the black market, occasionally having to run from the police for selling without a license. When the war ended, "La Cigale", a theatre on Montmartre, hired her as a nude showgirl at only fifteen years of age. After the club closed, she got a job at the Théâtre des Folies Bergère in Paris' ninth arrondissement when she walked in one day while it was raining. The manager hired her that day.

=== At the Folies Bergère ===
In the April 16, 1949 issue of Billboard, she was one of three costars to Josephine Baker mentioned by name: "Beside La Baker, the rest of the cast loses significance. However, Veronica Bell sings well, Colette Fleuriot dances ditto, and Yvonne Ménard is a picturesque foil for Dandy the irrepressible."

By 1950, Ménard had begun to fill in for Baker on a regular basis. In 1952, she was declared the star of the show.

There was, however, a challenge to her stardom per U.S. papers in the form of Ruby Richards, a singer in the show. Dorothy Kilgallen's Christmas 1952 column claimed Ménard was "grabbing everything in sight" in the shows to keep Richards from the spotlight. This assessment is contradicted by Variety's review from earlier in the same year which stated both women had notable roles.

By 1955, she was referred to as "the reigning queen of the Folies Bergère."

=== In films ===
Ménard also starred in several films, even while she was still performing at the theatre. Shortly before taking over the lead role from Baker, she played a part in the 1948 film "Le Destin Exécrable de Guillamette Babin" [Fr]. She is uncredited; however, when the film was banned in Brazil, she was quoted in a local magazine, asking, "Why can I dance this way on stage but not on screen?"

Her known films include 1947's Quai des Orfèvres; 1948's Le Destin Exécrable de Guillamette Babin [Fr] (English title: The Execrable Fate of Guillamette Babin); 1949's Bal Cupidon (English title: The Cupid Club); 1951's Les nuits de Paris [Fr] (English title: Paris Nights); 1953's Femmes de Paris (English title: Women of Paris); and 1959's Enigme aux Folies-Bergère (English title: The Enigma of the Folies-Bergere).

Newspaper advertisements for most of the films included a notice that audiences be over eighteen in order to attend.

George Jessel, a U.S. film producer, considered her for the titular role of Anna Held in a biopic in a 1954 interview, and described her in his book published the following year as "the exception" when he stated that he found the girls currently at the Folies to be subpar. A newspaper announcement regarding the offer of the role was made in La Patrie and Reading Eagle.

Prior to her U.S. tour, Ménard had a history of turning down U.S. film makers stating she would prefer to become an international music hall celebrity first. She fielded regular calls from Cy Howard, a producer, director, and screenwriter, in 1952.

=== Touring abroad ===
Ménard stated that if she wanted to advance her career, she needed to perform in other markets, because "once you are the star of the Folies, there is nothing else ahead except more Folies."

She toured several U.S. cities, including Miami with Lou Walters in the Latin Quarter, which had been scheduled to begin in December 1954. Variety listed her as arriving in New York that December. Her appearance in New York was teased in international newspapers as early as January 1955, and the tour also included a Las Vegas venue. The show, "Naughty Paris", continued in the U.S. at least through August 1956.

Her roles at the theatre were taken over by various different performers rather than appointing a single person to headline the show as Ménard and her predecessors had done. Variety commented on this decision by saying the theatre's "star days" had ended.

During 1956–1957, she joined with Totò in his revue (billed as Compagnia Totò-Yvonne Menard), traveling Italy for performances. The show was called "A prescindere" [It] ("Beside the Point"), and debuted on November 19, 1956, at Perugia as a test run. The first formal performance fell on December 1 at the Teatro Sistina in Rome.

There were rumors about Ménard leaving the revue due to illness that she issued a denial to in January 1957, according to Variety. The show did not include full nudity.

=== Return to Paris stage ===
Paul Derval [Fr], the owner and general manager of the Folies, closed the entire theatre down in January 1958. He vowed to reopen that March with the first new show in four years, "Folies Légères", bringing Ménard back as the star. Critics noted that she had entered the role of show master once the revue opened.

Just two months after the re-opening, Ménard attempted to take her own life. While she recuperated, her role in the Folies Bergère show was taken over by Micheline Roine and Lydia Lova. Ménard, according to the Spanish paper Sevilla [Sp], was remanded to a psychiatric hospital to overcome her "hysteria".

Though in semi-retirement after eventually being able to return home, Ménard continued to perform at the Folies Bergère until March 1960. She returned to the show in the beginning of 1964.

In 1967, Rita Cadillac gave an account of Derval approaching her to replace Ménard. Cadillac stated that as far as she knew, Ménard had not been aware a replacement was being sought after.

== Periodicals and newspapers ==
In 1948, Ménard won the "Miss Amber Forever" contest held in Paris. The book Forever Amber had been made into a film by Twentieth Century Fox the year prior, and the blurb about the award appeared with a picture of Yvonne Ménard in U.S. papers. This brought her to the attention of Orson Welles, who offered her a role in Hollywood. Ménard declined.

She continued to appear in numerous publications throughout her career. Many of the magazines that featured her were considered "men's entertainment" and often displayed photographs of a more risqué nature. Some of her more notable coverage came from Cavalcade, Life Magazine, Playboy Magazine, the Cabaret Yearbook, Esquire in November 1953 and August 1955, and Monsieur [Fr], which used images from the August 1955 issue of Esquire. The Italian and German press treated her as a celebrity, and she modeled fashion for a fad in the UK's Look magazine.

Briefer pieces appeared in the French newspaper Feuille d'Avis de Neuchâtel in 1964 and 1966, showing her continuing celebrity status.

In 1968, Ménard sat for an interview with the French television culture show Dim Dam Dom. A review of the resulting production said that her comments gave the piece a bitter tone.

== Perceptions of nudity ==
Before her time at the Folies, she had studied traditional art, including nudes. She understood that she would need years before being able to make a living from such work, and so began her career as a nude showgirl.

Ménard held no positive sentiment for American strippers; in 1956, she said she felt them too vulgar in their actions, adding, "I do not wish to bring out the pig in a man." She described her career as art, saying, "In Paris, to be a nude is to be artistic. We try to be like a beautiful painting from the brush of a man like Degas." She also stated that she did not view nudity as a "dirty thing", that in the Americas nudity as an art form was not understood. At the beginning of her U.S. tour in 1954, she was quoted as saying, "I will like to show how it is possible to be nude without being dirty, if the law lets me."

Ironically, Derval informed Quentin Reynolds in 1948 that he held very little esteem for the nudes on his stage, paying them only $80 (24,000 francs) each month, as compared to the $1,300 (400,000 francs) per month paid to Josephine Baker, despite the fact that the nudes drew the audiences to the theatre.

== Critical reception ==
In 1949, Billy Rose referred to Ménard as "the most exciting hunk of a girl in Europe".

Her performance as Mary Stuart in a showing prior to December 9, 1950, was reviewed by The Billboard as "one of [the] most magnificent ever portrayed here".

The Italian paper Giornale di Trieste [It] described how men speaking of Ménard would do so with the same seriousness of purpose that they would politics. 1952's Billboard said the season's show from the theatre looked to be a big tourist draw and noted that Ménard herself drew rave reviews from critics. A reviewer from the Los Angeles Times remarked that they felt the shows were not of the same caliber as they had been with Baker in 1950, but he had no complaints about Ménard's performance, stating she was "one of the most exciting personalities I have seen in a revue in many seasons."

Playboy, admittedly biased in some of their description due to their target audience, did point out that despite the hundreds of thousands of francs spent in creating the Folies' performances, the real attraction remained the players on stage, specifically the star of the show. While Derval lamented the fact that the shows included so much nudity, reviews of various Folies in Variety indicated that it was the nudity itself that continued to draw crowds to the theatre and that its absence from the revue made the scenes tedious to sit through.

Cosmopolitan praised Ménard and her performance saying that it was "impossible for this girl to look awkward".

Variety described her as Derval's "trump card" when mentioning the 1954 season at the Folies Bergère, but added, "in the final analysis she can't sing, dance, or act very well." The critic did acknowledge Ménard's ability to draw in crowds, describing her appeal as "indefinable". According to the Washington Post, Ménard had the potential for a film contract.

Army Times described Ménard's tour of U.S. cities Miami, Las Vegas, and New York as being a waste of time and money because she would "be strategically clothed, whatever the advertisements say." Variety, in contrast, said that the 90-minute shows delivered as promised, with Ménard's outfits barely staying within the bounds required by law.

At the end of her Florida tour, one critic commented, "She wisely invested much of her earnings in song and dance lessons."

In a review in April 1958, shortly after the theatre had reopened following the stagehand strike, a critic claimed the show lacked "a real star" like Mistinguett. He went on to say that Derval had been pushing Ménard into the role for years but that she lacked the ability, not having a "bouncy character" and citing her own admission that she "can't sing", though he went on to say that Ménard "is witty and graceful".

Ménard was described by Le Monde Diplomatique as having "fallen" in the years that followed the attempted suicide, having had "a short glory". It should be noted, however, that this same critic opined in the same article that women engaging in burlesque do so in order to find a husband, something Ménard had denied in her 1953 interview with Esquire. The only exceptions the critic noted to this were Colette Derèai, first runner-up to Miss France, 1948; and Claudine Auger, whom the critic only notes for her role as Domino Derval in Thunderball (James Bond, 1965).

With Ménard's return to the Folies Bergère in 1964, her performance as Cleopatra was well-received, with one critic stating that "M. Derval and M. Gyarmathy have obviously cooked [the skit] with love", adding that Ménard's decision to play the role with a southern accent served as a reminder that "the Nile is closer to the Canebière than the Champs-Elysées". Another critic of the same year described her as embodying the Folies principles of "nudity sans suggestiveness and brashness without vulgarity." The Italian press noted that she added an "androgynous charm" to the revue.

Decades after her attempt to take her own life, she remained a subject for art students. Her performances even inspired poses for artwork by Jim Silke, creator of Dark Horse's Rascals in Paradise.

== Personal life ==
Once she had become a star, Ménard had been known to date diplomats and stars, including Orson Welles. She was frequently pictured with exquisite jewelry. By 1953, Derval paid her $435 per month (175,000 francs). Because of these facts, some have assumed that she had "everything".

=== Attempted suicide ===
When she attempted to take her own life on the evening of May 1, 1958, the papers varied in their reporting of it. The Los Angeles Times only peripherally noted it, with a single sentence calling the act a "fit of depression". The Cumberland News and Lincoln Star reporting had a more neutral tone, making note that Ménard's friends said the attempt happened after the revue performance had not been well received by critics. The Italian paper l'Unità, however, reported on May 3, 1958, that the reason for what doctors diagnosed as "nervous depression" were still unclear, revealing that she had had an operation on her nervous system shortly before the attempt. While also mentioning the operation Ménard had shortly after returning to Paris from her Italian tour with Totò, Il Piccolo di Trieste included as part of its headline the supposition that her actions were either the result of a nervous breakdown or heartbreak. Stampa Sera makes mention of the operation as well, while making disparaging remarks as to the possible reason for Ménard's actions.

There are various accounts of what happened, and who was able to prevent a premature end to her life.

In one, her neighbors reported that they had heard a banging on their wall before retiring the evening Ménard made the attempt; when they awoke the next morning, it continued. Her neighbors entered her apartment to find her lying in her bed in a pool of her own blood, barely alive.

A different account claims she was found by the concierge sent to deliver telegrams when she did not respond to attempts to contact her room. In Izbicki's telling, Ménard was found in her bathroom, the position attributed to the idea that less pain would be involved if she slit her wrists while in the bath.

A third account claims that her "diligent maid" reached her in time to get help so that she didn't bleed out.

The Atlanta Constitution – and many other US papers – stated that only one wrist had been slashed, but even so she had lost enough blood to leave her in 'serious' condition. The Gettysburg Times gave an account of both one wrist and both wrists being slashed.

A photograph taken while she was convalescing at Boucicaut Hospital [Fr] following the attempt corroborates that her left wrist had been slashed.

Despite receiving at least three blood transfusions the first night, Ménard remained in critical condition. Eventually, she was remanded to a sanatorium to recuperate.

=== Marriage, divorce, remarriage ===
At some time between May 1958 and January 1965, Ménard married. By March 29, 1965, she was divorced after having only been married for three months.

She married again on March 7, 1966, this time to stagehand Michel Wagner, who was 21 years old to her 36. The couple eloped, wed at Boulogne-Billancourt. Derval told Ménard the marriage would be inconvenient for her career and chided her for her choice of paramour; Wagner's friends told him she didn't really love him, and his father disapproved of the match.
