= Henri Arius =

French actor (1897–1968)

- Born: 19 September 1887; Marseille, Bouches-du-Rhône, France
- Died: 8 May 1968 (aged 81); Marseille, Bouches-du-Rhône, France
- Occupation: Actor
- Years active: 1940-1966 (film)

Henri Arius (1897–1968) was a French film and stage actor. A character actor he appeared in a large number of films in wartime and post-war France.

== Selected filmography ==
- Don't Shout It from the Rooftops (1943)
- Jeannou (1943)
- The Lucky Star (1943)
- Rooster Heart (1946)
- The Adventure of Cabassou (1946)
- Inspector Sergil (1947)
- Quai des Orfèvres (1947)
- The Crowned Fish Tavern (1947)
- Rumours (1947)
- Sergil and the Dictator (1948)
- If It Makes You Happy (1948)
- The Passenger (1949)
- Two Loves (1949)
- Passion for Life (1949)
- The Wreck (1949)
- Oriental Port (1950)
- Here Is the Beauty (1950)
- Murders (1950)
- The Convict (1951)
- Savage Triangle (1951)
- Sergil Amongst the Girls (1952)
- Je l'ai été trois fois (1952)
- Manon of the Spring (1952)
- My Husband Is Marvelous (1952)
- Monsieur Scrupule, Gangster (1953)
- The Baker of Valorgue (1953)
- Carnival (1953)
- Naked in the Wind (1953)
- The Blonde Gypsy (1953)
- Napoleon Road (1953)
- Dangerous Turning (1954)
- Quay of Blondes (1954)
- L'Étrange Désir de monsieur Bard (1954)
- Your Turn, Callaghan (1955)
- Mademoiselle from Paris (1955)
- The Case of Doctor Laurent (1957)
- Girl and the River (1958)
- Rooster Heart (1958)
- The Law Is the Law (1958)
- Toi, le venin (1959)
- Quay of Illusions (1959)
- A Man Named Rocca (1961)

== Bibliography ==
- Crisp, Colin. French Cinema—A Critical Filmography: Volume 2, 1940–1958. Indiana University Press, 2015.
- Maltin, Leonard. Turner Classic Movies Presents Leonard Maltin's Classic Movie Guide: From the Silent Era Through 1965: Third Edition. Penguin, 2015.
- Pirolini, Alessandro. The Cinema of Preston Sturges: A Critical Study. McFarland, 2014.
