= Marie-Octobre =

1959 film

- Directed by: Julien Duvivier
- Written by: Julien Duvivier; Jacques Robert; Henri Jeanson
- Based on: Marie-Octobre by Jacques Robert
- Produced by: Lucien Viard
- Starring: Danielle Darrieux; Bernard Blier; Robert Dalban
- Cinematography: Robert Lefebvre
- Edited by: Marthe Poncin
- Music by: Jean Yatove
- Production companies: Abbey Films; Orex Films
- Distributed by: Pathé Consortium Cinéma
- Release date: 24 April 1959
- Running time: 99 minutes
- Country: France
- Language: French

Marie-Octobre is a 1959 French drama mystery film directed by Julien Duvivier and starring Danielle Darrieux, Bernard Blier and Robert Dalban. It is based on the eponymous novel by Jacques Robert. The entire action takes place in real time over 99 minutes. It was shot at the Boulogne Studios in Paris. The film's sets were designed by the art director Georges Wakhévitch. It is also known by the alternative title Secret Meeting The film was remade in 2008 by director Josée Dayan, starring Nathalie Baye.

== Plot ==
A group of ex-resistance fighters are brought together by Marie-Octobre, the code name of Marie-Helene Dumoulin (Danielle Darrieux). The former members of the network have carried on with their lives after the war, but this evening they are going to have to live again a fateful night – the night their leader was killed. He had been betrayed, his name given to the Germans. The search for the traitor puts each personality in the spotlight – and also that of the killed leader, Castille.

== Cast ==
- Danielle Darrieux as Marie-Helene Dumoulin
- Bernard Blier as Julien Simoneau, a lawyer
- Robert Dalban as Leon Blanchet, a locksmith
- Paul Frankeur as Lucien Marinval, a sales agent in Les Halles
- Daniel Ivernel as Robert Thibaud, a doctor
- Paul Meurisse as Francois Renaud-Picart, an industrialist
- Serge Reggiani as Antoine Rougier, a printer
- Jeanne Fusier-Gir as Victorine, governess
- Paul Guers as Père Yves Le Guen, a priest
- Noel Roquevert as Etienne Vandamme, a tax inspector
- Lino Ventura as Carlo Bernardi, a night club owner

== Around the film ==
- On a very similar plot line, British filmmaker Michael McCarthy directed in 1957 The Traitor, also shown in the US with the title The Accursed, starring Donald Wolfit, Anton Diffring and Christopher Lee.

== Bibliography ==
- Grant, John. A Comprehensive Encyclopedia of Film Noir: The Essential Reference Guide. Rowman & Littlefield, 2023.
