= Micheline Gary =

French actress (1925–2022)

- Born: Christiane Micheline Guary; 1 October 1925; Mimbaste, Landes, France
- Died: 25 December 2022 (aged 97); Paris, France
- Occupation: Actress
- Years active: 1947–1961 (film)
- Spouse: Paul Meurisse (m. 1960; died 1979)

Christiane Micheline Guary (1 October 1925 – 25 December 2022), better known as Micheline Gary, was a French film and stage actress who was active in the French film industry throughout the 1950s. In 1960 she married the actor Paul Meurisse.

Gary died in Paris on 25 December 2022, at the age of 97.

== Partial filmography ==
- The Adventures of Casanova (1947) - Consuela
- Mammy (1951) - Lucette
- Leathernose (1952) - Une paysanne
- An Artist with Ladies (1952) - Une invitée (uncredited)
- Twelve Hours of Happiness (1952)
- Forbidden Fruit (1952) - Léa
- The Lovers of Midnight (1953) - Monique
- Les amours finissent à l'aube (1953) - Charlotte
- Endless Horizons (1953)
- A Sarjeta Foi Meu Berço (1954) - (uncredited)
- Quay of Blondes (1954) - La secrétaire
- The Big Flag (1954) - Françoise Aubry
- The Sheep Has Five Legs (1954) - L'hôtesse de l'instutut de beauté
- Madame du Barry (1954) - Une fille chez La Gourdan
- Falsa Obsessão (1954) - Irène (uncredited)
- The Beautiful Otero (1954) - Eglantine
- Ali Baba and the Forty Thieves (1954)
- Fantaisie d'un jour (1955) - Monique de Cédillon
- Stopover in Orly (1955) - Geneviève
- Caroline and the Rebels (1955) - Conchita d'Aranda
- Le couteau sous la gorge (1955) - Simone Hourtin
- Maid in Paris (1956) - Une pensionnaire
- Élisa (1957) - Gobe Lune
- An Eye for an Eye (1957) - La femme de l'automobiliste
- The Adventures of Remi (1958) - Une lavandière
- Me and the Colonel (1958) - Young Nun (uncredited)
- Cigarettes, whisky et p'tites pépées (1958) - Véronique
- Serenade of Texas (1958) - Denise
- La valse du gorille (1959) - La blonde
- Witness in the City (1959) - Une cliente brune de Lambert (uncredited)
- The Doctor's Horrible Experiment (1959, TV Movie) - Marguerite
- Picnic on the Grass (1959) - Madeleine
- La 1000eme fenêtre (1960) - (uncredited)
- The President (1961)

== Bibliography ==
- Goble, Alan. The Complete Index to Literary Sources in Film. Walter de Gruyter, 1999.
