= Paul Meurisse =

French actor

- Born: Paul Gustave Pierre Meurisse; 21 December 1912; Dunkirk, France
- Died: 19 January 1979 (aged 66); Neuilly-sur-Seine, France
- Resting place: Neuilly-sur-Seine community cemetery
- Occupation: Actor
- Years active: 1940–1979
- Spouses: Michèle Alfa (m. 1942, divorced) Micheline Cheirel (m. 1951; div. 1955) Micheline Gary (m. 1960)

Paul Meurisse (French pronunciation: [pɔl møʁis]; 21 December 1912 – 19 January 1979) was a French actor who appeared in over 60 films and many stage productions. Meurisse was noted for the elegance of his acting style, and for his versatility. He was equally adept in comedic and dramatic roles. His screen roles ranged from the droll and drily humorous to the menacing and disturbing. His most celebrated role was that of the sadistic and vindictive headmaster in the 1955 film Les Diaboliques.

== Early life and career ==
Meurisse was born in Dunkirk, on the north-east coast of France. He grew up on the island of Corsica, to where his bank manager father had been transferred when Meurisse was a small child.

After leaving school, Meurisse moved to Aix-en-Provence, where he became a solicitor's clerk. But his passion was for the stage, and he acquired evening work in the chorus of music hall revues.

In 1936, Meurisse moved to Paris, where he found work in musical theatres and nightclubs, and appeared with performers such as Marie Dubas. He specialised in taking cheerful, upbeat songs and singing them in a comically downbeat, lugubrious fashion.

In 1939, Meurisse met singer Edith Piaf, and the two became lovers for two years. Piaf, however, did not see a future for Meurisse as a singer, and encouraged him to try acting instead.

== Film career ==
Meurisse first performed in film in Vingt-quatre heures de perm, which was filmed in 1940 but not released until 1945. Ne bougez plus (1941) was the first of his films to be released. Thereafter he was in steady demand as an actor (in 1948, for example, he was credited in seven films). Meurisse played a wide range of roles, from gangsters (Macadam, Impasse des Deux-Anges) and policemen (Inspecteur Sergil, Le Dessous des cartes), to comedy (the Monocle films) and historical (La Castiglione, L'Affaire des poisons). The quality of the films was varied, but Meurisse's versatility brought him recognition, with his performance often considered the best part of an otherwise mediocre effort.

Meurisse's most famous role was that of Michel Delasalle in Henri-Georges Clouzot's 1955 thriller Les Diaboliques, with Simone Signoret and Véra Clouzot. In a thoroughly unsympathetic part, Meurisse was compelling. The film, with its dark, claustrophobic atmosphere and celebrated twist ending, became an international success. It was among the earliest foreign-language films to be widely distributed in English-speaking markets and is the film for which Meurisse is best known.

Other of his notable films include Julien Duvivier's inquisitorial and oppressive Marie-Octobre (1959), Jean Renoir's Le Dejeuner sur l'herbe (1959), Clouzot's courtroom drama La Vérité (1960) and Melville's crime thriller Le deuxième souffle (1966). Meurisse made three appearances as Commandant Théobald Dromard, aka "The Monocle", in the Eurospy comedies Le monocle noir (1961), L'oeil du monocle (1962), and Le monocle rit jaune (1964).

The 1969 film L'Armée des ombres, in which Meurisse had a leading role, was released in 2006 on DVD, under the title Army of Shadows, in the UK and US, to critical acclaim.

== Stage career ==
Meurisse appeared in many stage productions, in plays by both contemporary French authors such as Marcel Achard and Jean Anouilh to classical English playwrights Shakespeare and George Bernard Shaw. In the mid-1950s he was a sociétaire of the Comédie-Française.

== Private life ==
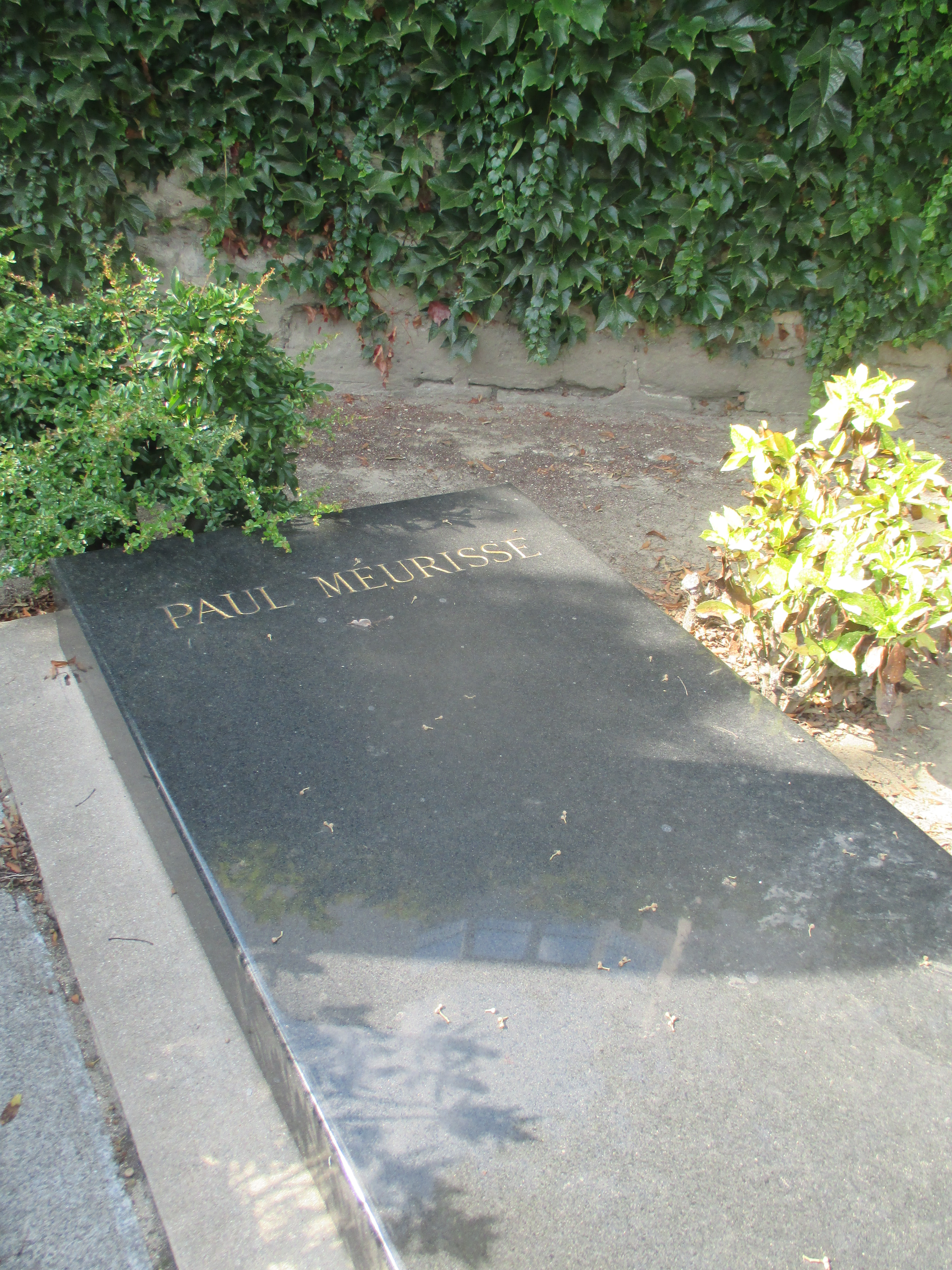
His grave.

Meurisse married three times: to Michèle Alfa (1942, divorced); Micheline Cheirel (1951, divorced; she was previously married to British actor John Loder); and Micheline Gary (1960 to his death).

== Death ==
Meurisse suffered from asthma for much of his life. He was taken ill following a performance at the Théâtre Hébertot in Paris. He died at age 66 on 19 January 1979 of an asthma-related heart attack.

== Filmography ==
- 1941: Ne bougez plus (dir. Pierre Caron) – Hector
- 1941: Montmartre-sur-Seine (dir. Georges Lacombe) – Paul Mariol
- 1942: No Love Allowed (dir. Richard Pottier) – Maxime Gavard
- 1942: Love Marriage (dir. Henri Decoin) – Robert
- 1943: The Wolf Farm (dir. Richard Pottier) – Furet
- 1945: Vingt-quatre heures de perm (dir. Maurice Cloche)
- 1945: Marie la Misère (dir. Jacques de Baroncelli) – Edouard
- 1946: L'Insaisissable Frédéric (dir. Richard Pottier) – B.B. / Richard Fernay
- 1946: Macadam (dir. Marcel Blistène) – Victor Menard
- 1947: Inspecteur Sergil (dir. Jacques Daroy) – Inspecteur Pierre Sergil
- 1947: Monsieur Chasse (dir. Willy Rozier) – Moricet
- 1947: Bethsabée (dir. Léonide Moguy) – Le capitaine Lucien Sommervill – l'ex amant d'Arabella
- 1947: La Fleur de l'âge (dir. Marcel Carné) (uncompleted)
- 1948: The Eleven O'Clock Woman (dir. Jean-Devaivre) – Stanislas-Octave Seminario dit 'SOS'
- 1948: Manù il contrabbandiere (dir. Lucio De Caro) – Ispettore Nansen
- 1948: Le colonel Durand (dir. René Chanas) – Le colonel d'empire Gérard Durand
- 1948: Le Dessous des cartes (dir. André Cayatte) – Inspecteur Nansen
- 1948: Impasse des deux anges (dir. Maurice Tourneur) – Jean
- 1948: Sergil et le dictateur (dir. Jacques Daroy) – Inspecteur Sergil
- 1948: Scandal (dir. René Le Hénaff) – Steve Richardson
- 1949: The Red Angel (dir. Jacques Daniel-Norman) – Pierre Ravignac
- 1949: Dernière heure, édition spéciale (dir. Maurice de Canonge) – Dominique Coche
- 1950: Agnes of Nothing (dir. Pierre Billon) – Carlos de Chaligny
- 1951: Maria of the End of the World (dir. Jean Stelli) – Mathias
- 1951: Serenade to the Executioner (dir. Jean Stelli) – William A. Schomberg
- 1951: Ma femme est formidable (dir. André Hunebelle) – Lui-même (uncredited)
- 1951: Vedettes sans maquillage (dir. Jacques Guillon) (documentary)
- 1952: Sergil chez les filles (dir. Jacques Daroy) – Inspecteur Sergil
- 1953: I'm a Snitch (dir. René Chanas) – Bob Torquella
- 1954: La contessa di Castiglione dir. Georges Combret) – L'empereur Napoléon III
- 1955: Les Diaboliques (dir. Henri-Georges Clouzot) – Michel Delassalle
- 1955: Fortune carrée (dir. Bernard Borderie) – Mordhom
- 1955: The Affair of the Poisons (dir. Henri Decoin) – L'abbé Etienne Guibourg
- 1957: Until the Last One (dir. Pierre Billon) – Fredo Ricioni – le chef de la bande
- 1957: The Inspector Likes a Fight (dir. Jean-Devaivre) – L'inspecteur Morice
- 1957: The Violent (dir. Henri Calef) – Inspecteur Principal Malouvier
- 1958: Not Delivered (dir. Gilles Grangier) – Le commissaire divisionnaire Varzeilles
- 1958: Seventh Heaven (dir. Raymond Bernard) – Manuel Villa
- 1959: Marie-Octobre (dir. Julien Duvivier) – François Renaud-Picart, industriel
- 1959: Guinguette (dir. Jean Delannoy) – Le vicomte Edouard de Villancourt
- 1959: La Tête contre les murs (dir. Georges Franju) – Dr. Emery
- 1959: Le Déjeuner sur l'herbe (dir. Jean Renoir) – Etienne Alexis
- 1959: Simenon (dir. Jean-François Hauduroy) (documentary – narrator)
- 1960: La Française et l'Amour (dir. Henri Verneuil) – Jean-Claude Perret (segment "Adultère, L'")
- 1960: La Vérité (dir. Henri-Georges Clouzot) – Maître Éparvier
- 1961: Le Monocle noir (dir. Georges Lautner) – Le commandant Théobald Dromard dit 'Le Monocle'
- 1961: Le Jeu de la vérité (dir. Robert Hossein) – Portrant
- 1961: Les Nouveaux aristocrates (dir. Francis Rigaud) – Le père Philippe de Maubrun
- 1962: Carillons sans joie (dir. Charles Brabant) – Le capitaine de Lambérieux
- 1962: L'oeil du Monocle (dir. Georges Lautner) – Le commandant Théobald Dromard, dit "Le Monocle"
- 1963: Chicken Feed for Little Birds (dir. Marcel Carné) – Armand Lodet
- 1963: Méfiez-vous, mesdames (dir. André Hunebelle) – Charles Rouvier
- 1963: Les Tontons flingueurs (dir. Georges Lautner) – Un passant distingué (uncredited)
- 1963: L'assassin connaît la musique... (dir. Pierre Chenal) – Lionel Fribourg
- 1964: Le Monocle rit jaune (dir. Georges Lautner) – Le commandant Théobald Dromard dit'Le Monocle'
- 1965: Moi et les hommes de quarante ans (dir. Jacques Pinoteau) – Alexandre Dumourier
- 1965: The Majordomo (dir. Jean Delannoy) – Léopold
- 1965: La Grosse Caisse (dir. Alex Joffé) – Paul Filippi, le gangster
- 1965: When the Pheasants Pass (dir. Édouard Molinaro) – Alexandre Larsan-Bellac
- 1966: Congress of Love (dir. Géza von Radványi) – Count Talleyrand
- 1966: Le deuxième souffle (dir. Jean-Pierre Melville) – Commissaire Blot
- 1969: L'Armée des ombres (dir. Jean-Pierre Melville) – Luc Jardie
- 1971: Le Cri du cormoran le soir au-dessus des jonques (dir. Michel Audiard) – Kruger
- 1971: Doucement les basses (dir. Jacques Deray) – L'évêque
- 1973: Un flic hors la loi (dir. Stefano Vanzina)
- 1973: Les voraces (dir. Sergio Gobbi) – L'inspecteur Martino
- 1974: The Suspects (dir. Michel Wyn) – Laurent Kirchner
- 1975: Le Gitan (dir. José Giovanni) – Yan Kuq
- 1975: L'Éducation amoureuse de Valentin (dir. Jean L'Hôte) – Julien Blaise (final film role)
