= The Eye of the Monocle =

- Directed by: Georges Lautner
- Written by: Georges Lautner; Jacques Robert; Colonel Rémy (novel)
- Produced by: Paul Joly
- Starring: Paul Meurisse; Elga Andersen; Gaia Germani
- Cinematography: Maurice Fellous
- Edited by: Michelle David
- Music by: Jean Yatove
- Production company: Orex Films
- Distributed by: Pathé Distribution
- Release date: 14 November 1962
- Running time: 105 minutes
- Country: France
- Language: French

The Eye of the Monocle (French:L'oeil du monocle) is a 1962 French comedy thriller film directed by Georges Lautner and starring Paul Meurisse, Elga Andersen and Gaia Germani. It is the sequel of The Black Monocle (1961).

Location shooting took place in Corsica.

== Cast ==
- Paul Meurisse as Le commandant Théobald Dromard, dit "Le Monocle"
- Elga Andersen as Erika Murger
- Gaia Germani as Diana
- Charles Millot as Commissaire Matlov
- Raymond Meunier as Bob Dugoinneau
- Paul Mercey as Schlumpf
- Henri Cogan as Archiloque
- Jean Luisi as Un 'sinistre'
- Jean-Michel Audin as Un 'sinistre'
- Josette Demay
- Michel Duplaix
- Richard Larke as Major Cyring
- Barbara Brand as La danseuse
- Robert Dalban as Poussin
- Maurice Biraud as Martigue
- Guy Henry
- Georges Lautner as Un officier allemand

== Bibliography ==
- Rège, Philippe. Encyclopedia of French Film Directors, Volume 1. Scarecrow Press, 2009.
