= The Cupid Club =

1949 film

- Directed by: Marc-Gilbert Sauvajon
- Written by: Marc-Gilbert Sauvajon
- Produced by: Francis Cosne; Georges Dancigers; Lucien Masson; Alexandre Mnouchkine
- Starring: Pierre Blanchar; Simone Renant; Yves Vincent
- Cinematography: René Gaveau
- Edited by: Raymond Leboursier
- Music by: Jean Marion
- Production companies: La Société des Films Sirius; Les Films Ariane
- Distributed by: La Société des Films Sirius
- Release date: 18 May 1949
- Running time: 100 minutes
- Country: France
- Language: French

The Cupid Club (French: Bal Cupidon) is a 1949 comedy crime film directed by Marc-Gilbert Sauvajon and starring Pierre Blanchar, Simone Renant and Yves Vincent. It was shot during 1948, but released the following year. It was made at the Photosonor Studios in Paris, with sets designed by the art director Eugène Delfau.

== Synopsis ==
Flip, an amateur detective is arrested for speeding and is prosecuted by the lawyer Isabelle and convicted. When shortly afterwards a man is murdered the two join forces to investigate. Much of the mystery surrounds a nightclub Bal Cupidon whose owner was having an affair with the dead man's wife.

== Cast ==
- Pierre Blanchar as Flip
- Simone Renant as Isabelle
- Yves Vincent as Morezzi
- Marcelle Praince as Mme Chanut
- Suzanne Dantès as Mme Delacroix
- Henri Crémieux as Cresat
- Maria Mauban as Anne-Marie
- René Blancard as Turnier
- André Bervil as Tonio
- Marion Tourès as Christine
- Germaine Michel as Clémence
- François Joux as Gratien
- Pierre Juvenet as Le président Chanut
- Albert Michel as Le gardien
- Janine Miller as L'annonceuse
- Yvonne Ménard as La danseuse
- Odette Barencey as La cuisinière
- Henry Murray as Le commissaire
- André Wasley as Victor
- Christiane Delacroix as La bonne
- Henri Niel as Le directeur de la prison
- Christian Duvaleix as Le photographe
- Julien Maffre as Un monsieur

== Bibliography ==
- Rège, Philippe. Encyclopedia of French Film Directors, Volume 1. Scarecrow Press, 2009.
