= The Wreck (1949 film) =

1949 film

- Directed by: Willy Rozier
- Written by: Willy Rozier
- Based on: Chanson flamenca by Jean Caubet
- Produced by: Willy Rozier
- Starring: André Le Gall; Françoise Arnoul; Aimé Clariond
- Cinematography: Fred Langenfeld
- Edited by: Denise Charvein
- Music by: Jean Yatove
- Production company: Sport-Films
- Distributed by: Les Films du Verseau
- Release date: 15 December 1949
- Running time: 88 minutes
- Country: France
- Language: French

The Wreck (French: L'épave) is a 1949 French drama film directed by Willy Rozier and starring André Le Gall, Françoise Arnoul and Aimé Clariond. Location shooting took place around the Mediterranean coast of France. It is also known by the alternative title Sin and Desire. It attracted notice for brief scenes of nudity featuring Françoise Arnoul in her first credited film.

== Synopsis ==
A passionate young Spanish girl Perrucha leaves home and gets work as a dancer in a seedy cabaret in Toulon that features striptease shows amongst the entertainment. After being fired following a riot by the rowdy customers she takes up with Mario a deep sea diver who has fallen madly in love with her.

Wishing to support her in style, he takes on a very dangerous diving job on a shipwreck. Injured during it he spends week on his hospital. Due to a misunderstanding encouraged by a malicious associate she takes up with a wealth industrialist as his mistress. Ultimately the two are able to overcome their problems and return to each other.

== Cast ==
- André Le Gall as Mario
- Françoise Arnoul as Perrucha
- Aimé Clariond as Marcadier
- Raymond Cordy as Ignace
- Charles Blavette as Raymond la Douleur
- René Blancard as Alexandrini
- Ketti Dallan as L'amie de Perrucha
- Henri Arius as Le directeur
- Jacqueline Johel as Gaby
- Louis Lions as Théodore
- Marco Villa as Le médecin de la capitainerie
- Lucien Callamand as e régisseur

== Bibliography ==
- Goble, Alan. The Complete Index to Literary Sources in Film. Walter de Gruyter, 1999.
- Rège, Philippe. Encyclopedia of French Film Directors, Volume 1. Scarecrow Press, 2009.
