= Yves Vincent =

French film and television actor (1921–2016)

- Born: 5 August 1921; Thônes, France
- Died: 6 January 2016 (aged 94); Montacher-Villegardin, France
- Occupation: Actor
- Years active: 1946-1988

Yves Vincent (5 August 1921 – 6 January 2016) was a French film and television actor.

== Biography ==
Born in Haute-Savoie, Yves Vincent spent a large part of his youth in French Algeria where he started out in the troupe of the Comédie de Radio-Algérie.

In cinema, he made his first film in 1944 in Cairo with his mother, the prelude to a long career.

He appeared in numerous television films and soap operas. Between 1988 and 1991, he played Judge Garonne in the television series Tribunal.

In October 2013, he published his memoirs: Do you want to smile with me?, published by Christian Navarro, where he recounts, among other things, his relationship with Ingrid Bergman, Edwige Feuillère and Brigitte Bardot. In 2015, with the same publisher, he published the novel Des Vagues à l'Âme. In late 2016, the actor's last autobiographical work was released posthumously: "4, boulevard Laferrière" (ed. Christian Navarro), in which he reveals fragments of his childhood and adolescence, as if his own disappearance was not an end.

His funeral took place on 13 January 2016 in a civil ceremony at the Joigny crematorium.

== Selected filmography ==
- Devil and the Angel (1946) – Robert
- The Crowned Fish Tavern (1947) – Pierre Astor
- The Sharks of Gibraltar (1947) – André Duval
- The Renegade (1948) – Jean Costa
- The Cavalier of Croix-Mort (1948) – Simon de Chabre
- The Cupid Club (1949) – Morezzi
- La maternelle (1949) – Dr. Libois
- The Nude Woman (1949) – Pierre Bernier
- The Dancer of Marrakesh (1949) – Jean Portal
- Beware of Blondes (1950) – Luigi Costelli
- Oriental Port (1950) – Vaucourt
- Captain Ardant (1951) – Le capitaine Pierre Ardant
- Tapage nocturne (1951) – Frank Varescot
- My Wife Is Formidable (1951) – Le trompettiste (uncredited)
- Si ça vous chante (1951)
- The Case Against X (1952) – L'inspecteur Richard
- Grand Gala (1952) – Pierre Bouvais
- Sins of Rome (1953) – Octavius
- Monsieur Scrupule, Gangster (1953) – M. Scrupule
- Pity for the Vamps (1956) – André Larcher
- Le circuit de minuit (1956) – Jean Gaillard
- OSS 117 Is Not Dead (1957) – Boris Obarian
- Judicial Police (1957) – Inspecteur Giverny
- Babette Goes to War (1959) – Capt. Darcy
- Ce soir on tue (1959) – Le commissaire Van Eck
- La dragée haute (1960) – De Marchelier
- Alibi pour un meurtre (1961) – Ciello
- Les nouveaux aristocrates (1961) – Le docteur Pierre Prullé-Rousseau
- The Hideout (1962) – Doctor
- Knights of Terror (1963) – Capitano Mirko
- Muriel (1963) – L'homme du couple d'acheteurs
- Anatomy of a Marriage: My Days with Jean-Marc (1964) – Granjouan
- Anatomy of a Marriage: My Days with Françoise (1964) – Granjouan
- Your Turn to Die (1967) – Felton
- Le gendarme se marie (1968) – Le colonel
- Hibernatus (1969) – Edouard Crépin-Jaujard
- Her and She and Him (1970) – Mathias Decas
- Le gendarme en balade (1970) – Le colonel de gendarmerie examinateur
- Libido: The Urge to Love (1971) – The priest
- Valparaiso, Valparaiso (1971) – Le maître de maison
- Impossible Is Not French (1974) – Nadar
- Les filles de Grenoble (1981) – Le conseiller
- Surprise Party (1983) – M. Bazin
- La rumba (1987) – Del Monte, l'ambassadeur d'Italie
- La maison assassinée (1988) – The judge

== Bibliography ==
- Goble, Alan. The Complete Index to Literary Sources in Film. Walter de Gruyter, 1999.
