= The Martyr of Bougival =

1949 film

- Directed by: Jean Loubignac
- Written by: Jean Guitton (play); Jean Loubignac
- Produced by: Emile Buhot
- Starring: Jeanne Fusier-Gir; Bach; Line Dariel
- Cinematography: René Colas
- Edited by: Raymonde Battini
- Music by: Marceau Van Hoorebecke
- Production company: Optimax Films
- Distributed by: Société Nouvelle de Cinématographie
- Release date: 3 November 1949
- Running time: 110 minutes
- Country: France
- Language: French

The Martyr of Bougival (French: Le martyr de Bougival) is a 1949 French comedy crime film directed by Jean Loubignac and starring Jeanne Fusier-Gir, Bach and Line Dariel. The film's sets were designed by the art director Raymond Druart.

== Plot ==
A prompter at the Folies Bergère comes under suspicion of murder when a female dancer's body is found in his trunk.

== Cast ==
- Jeanne Fusier-Gir as Maître Brigitte
- Simone Michels as Irma
- Line Dariel as Victorine
- Simone Paris as Arlette
- Maguy Horiot as La bonne
- Bach as Jules
- Roland Armontel as Le juge d'instruction
- Alexandre Rignault as L'inspecteur Foucher
- René Lacourt as Modeste
- Jacques Berlioz as Brachard
- Paul Raysse as Lippman
- Raphaël Patorni as Mareuil
- Nicolas Amato as Le brigadier
- Gérard Saint-Val as Un inspecteur

== Bibliography ==
- Rège, Philippe. Encyclopedia of French Film Directors, Volume 1. Scarecrow Press, 2009.
