= Tilda Thamar =

Argentine actress (1921–1989)

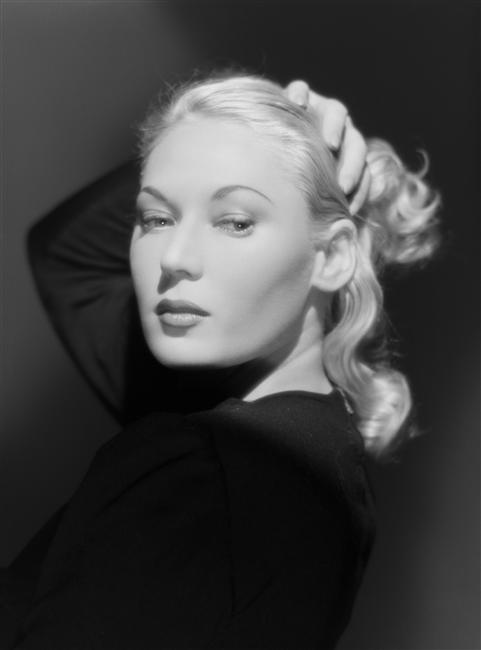
- Born: Matilde Sofía Margarita Abrecht; 7 December 1921; Urdinarrain, Entre Ríos, Argentina
- Died: 12 April 1989 (aged 67); Clermont-en-Argonne, Meuse, Lorraine, France
- Occupation: Film actress
- Years active: 1936–1987

Tilda Thamar (born Matilde Sofía Margarita Abrecht; 7 December 1921 – 12 April 1989) was an Argentine actress of the Golden Age of Argentine cinema. She was born in Entre Rios Province, Argentina, in 1921. She was married to Spanish portrait painter Alejo Vidal-Quadras and divorced in 1971. Thamar and Vidal-Quadras lived in Paris, France. Thamar was killed in a car accident in Clermont-en-Argonne, Meuse, in the Lorraine region of France in 1989.

== Selected filmography ==
- Encadenado (1940)
- The Corpse Breaks a Date (1944)
- Wake Up to Life (1945)
- A Model from Paris (1946)
- White Horse Inn (1948)
- Night Round (1949)
- The Red Angel (1949)
- Oriental Port (1950)
- Serenade to the Executioner (1951)
- Bouquet of Joy (1951)
- Devil's Roundup (1952)
- Massacre in Lace (1952)
- The Woman with the Orchid (1952)
- The Blonde Gypsy (1953)
- Monsieur Scrupule, Gangster (1953)
- Maid in Paris (1956)
- Paris, Palace Hotel (1956)
- The Babes in the Secret Service (1956)
- A Bomb for a Dictator (1957)
- A Night at the Moulin Rouge (1957)
- The Singer from Mexico (1957)
- Friends and Neighbours (1959)
- Living It Up (1966)
- Faceless (1987)
