= Line Dariel =

Belgian-French singer (1898–1956)

- Born: 16 April 1898; Molenbeek, Brussels, Belgium
- Died: 15 January 1956 (aged 57); Lille, France
- Occupations: Actress, singer
- Years active: 1933–1955 (film)

Line Dariel (1898–1956) was a Belgian-born French singer and actress.

== Selected filmography ==
- The Fraudster (1937)
- My Priest Among the Rich (1938)
- Le mystère du 421 (1938)
- The Martyr of Bougival (1949)
- Emile the African (1949)

== Bibliography ==
- Goble, Alan. The Complete Index to Literary Sources in Film. Walter de Gruyter, 1999.
