= The Passenger (1949 film) =

1949 film

- Directed by: Jacques Daroy
- Written by: Guy de Chantepleure (novel); André Haguet; Georges de Tervagne; Jean Reynac
- Starring: Georges Marchal; Dany Robin; René Génin
- Cinematography: Jean Lehérissey
- Music by: Marceau Van Hoorebecke
- Production company: Société Méditerranéenne de Production
- Release date: 4 November 1949
- Running time: 112 minutes
- Country: France
- Language: French

The Passenger (French: La passagère) is a 1949 French comedy film directed by Jacques Daroy and starring Georges Marchal, Dany Robin and René Génin. The film's sets were designed by the art director Gilbert Garcin.

== Cast ==
- Georges Marchal as Pierre Kerjean
- Dany Robin as Nicole Vernier
- René Génin as Firmin
- Dora Doll as Colette Mouche
- Henri Bosc as Bermond
- Michel Marsay as Prince Grégor
- Henri Arius as M.. Chardon
- Germaine Gerlata as Mme. Chardon
- Claire Olivier as Mlle Arguin
- Marfa d'Hervilly as Mme Davracay
- Michel Leray as Lecoulteux

== Bibliography ==
- Dayna Oscherwitz & MaryEllen Higgins. The A to Z of French Cinema. Scarecrow Press, 2009.
