= Liliane Bert =

French actress (1922–2015)

- Born: 21 November 1922; Paris, France
- Died: 8 April 2015 (aged 92); Paris, France
- Other name: Liliane Egmann
- Occupation: Actress
- Years active: 1942-1970 (film)

Liliane Bert (1922–2015) was a French film and television actress.

== Selected filmography ==
- The Blue Veil (1942)
- We Are Not Married (1946)
- Four Knaves (1947)
- Colonel Durand (1948)
- Sergil and the Dictator (1948)
- The Heroic Monsieur Boniface (1949)
- The Atomic Monsieur Placido (1950)
- Andalusia (1951)
- The Dream of Andalusia (1951)
- A Girl on the Road (1952)
- Au diable la vertu (1954)
- Orient Express (1954)
- The Price of Love (1955)
- Voici le temps des assassins (1956)
- La Tour, prends garde ! (1958)

== Bibliography ==
- Hayward, Susan. French Costume Drama of the 1950s: Fashioning Politics in Film. Intellect Books, 2010.
