= Jeanne Rongier =

French painter

- Born: November 27, 1852; Mâcon, France
- Died: January 19, 1929; Paris, France
- Known for: Painting

Jeanne Rongier (French pronunciation: [ʒan ʁɔ̃ʒje]; November 27, 1852 – January 19, 1929) was a French painter.

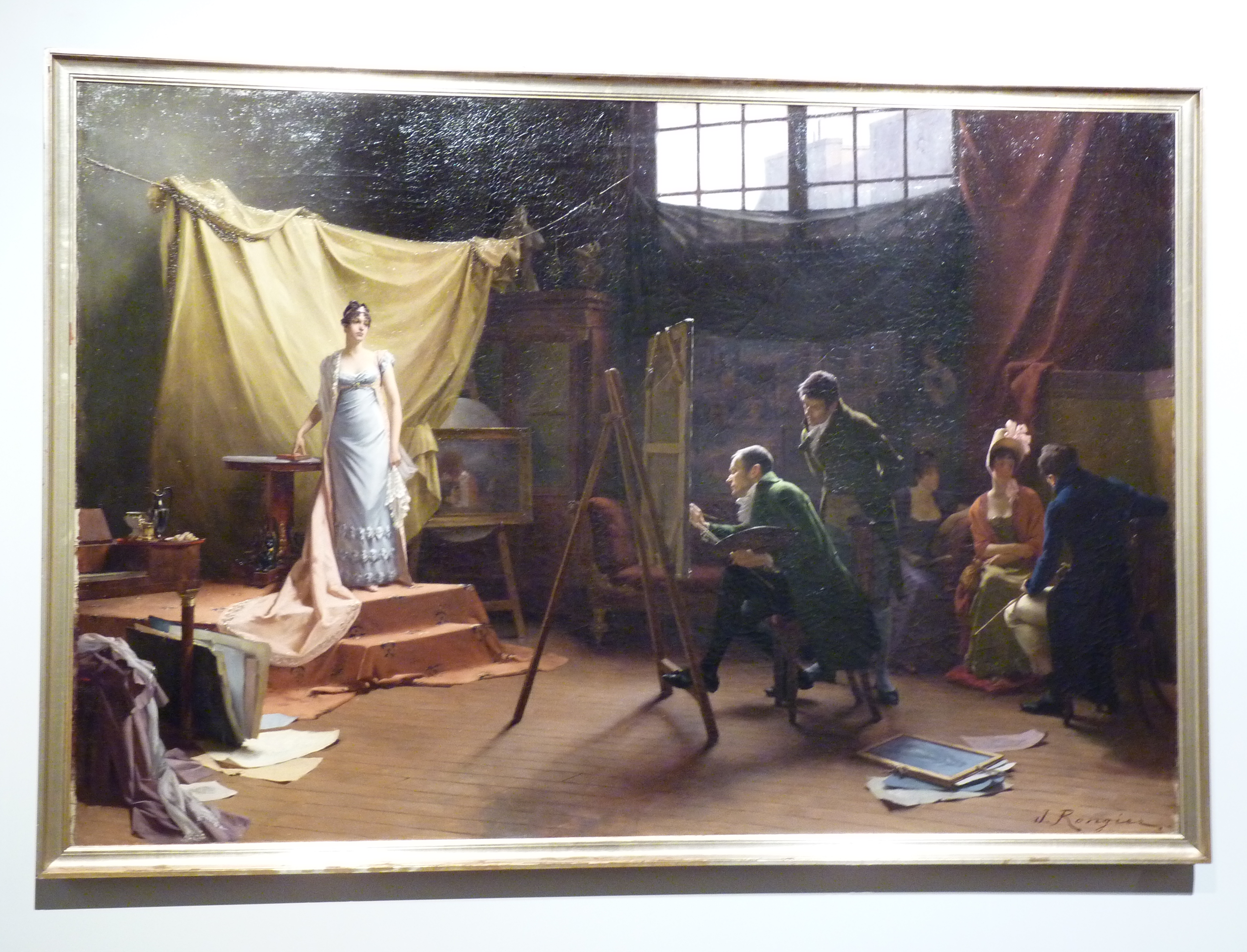
Sitting for a portrait in 1806

Rongier was born in Mâcon where she took lessons from Henri Senart. She later took lessons from Henri Joseph Harpignies, and Evariste Vital Luminais. She is known for historic genre works after old masters such as Frans Hals and Jacob Duck.

Rongier exhibited her work at the Pennsylvania Building, the Palace of Fine Arts and The Woman's Building at the 1893 World's Columbian Exposition in Chicago, Illinois.

Her painting Sitting for a portrait in 1806, was included in the 1905 book Women Painters of the World.

Rongier's painting Picking The Dandelion was last seen in Genshiro Kawamoto's abandoned art collection after his arrest in 2013. This painting was previously owned by Sotheby's and auctioned off June 15th 1994.
