= Monsieur Scrupule, Gangster =

1953 film

- Directed by: Jacques Daroy
- Written by: Jean Bommart (play); Jacques Rey
- Produced by: Jacques Daroy; Jean-Loup Pellecuer
- Starring: Tilda Thamar; Yves Vincent; Howard Vernon
- Cinematography: Jean Lehérissey
- Edited by: Jeanne Rongier
- Production company: Films Paradis
- Distributed by: Pathé Consortium Cinéma
- Release date: 12 August 1953
- Running time: 85 minutes
- Country: France
- Language: French

Monsieur Scrupule, Gangster (French: Monsieur Scrupule gangster) is a 1953 French crime film directed by Jacques Daroy and starring Tilda Thamar, Yves Vincent and Howard Vernon.

== Cast ==
- Tilda Thamar as Rolande
- Yves Vincent as M. Scrupule
- Howard Vernon as L'ami de Rolande

== Bibliography ==
- Rège, Philippe. Encyclopedia of French Film Directors, Volume 1. Scarecrow Press, 2009.
