= Jacques Daroy =

French screenwriter and film director

- Born: 1896
- Died: 1963 (aged 66–67)
- Other name: Jacques Schenk
- Occupation: Director
- Years active: 1934 – 1953 (film)

Jacques Daroy (1896–1963) was a French screenwriter and film director. He directed the historical crime film Vidocq in 1939.

== Selected filmography ==
=== Director ===
- Véréna's Wedding (1938)
- Vidocq (1939)
- Raboliot (1946)
- Rumours (1947)
- Inspector Sergil (1947)
- The Passenger (1949)
- Oriental Port (1950)
- Sergil Amongst the Girls (1952)
- Monsieur Scrupule, Gangster (1953)

== Bibliography ==
- Crisp, C.G. The Classic French Cinema, 1930-1960. Indiana University Press, 1993.
