= List of French films of 1956 =

A list of films produced in France in 1956.

Title	Director	Cast	Genre	Notes
The Adventures of Gil Blas	René Jolivet, Ricardo Muñoz Suay	Georges Marchal, Barbara Laage, Susana Canales	Adventure	Co-production with Spain
And God Created Woman	Roger Vadim	Brigitte Bardot, Curd Jurgens, Marie Glory	Crime	
Babes a GoGo	Paul Mesnier	Jane Sourza, Raymond Souplex, Louis de Funès	Comedy	
The Babes in the Secret Service	Raoul André	Claudine Dupuis, Louise Carletti, Tilda Thamar	Comedy	
Baratin	Jean Stelli	Roger Nicolas, Ginette Baudin, Sylvia Lopez	Musical	
Blood to the Head	Gilles Grangier	Jean Gabin, Paul Frankeur, Claude Sylvain	Crime	
Bob le flambeur	Jean-Pierre Melville	Roger Duchesne, Isabelle Corey, Daniel Cauchy	Crime	
The Bride Is Much Too Beautiful	Pierre Gaspard-Huit	Brigitte Bardot, Louis Jourdan, Micheline Presle	Comedy	
Bonjour sourire	Claude Sautet	Olga Thorel, Louis de Funès	Comedy	
The Country I Come From	Marcel Carné	Gilbert Becaud, Françoise Arnoul	Comedy musical romance	
Crime et châtiment	Georges Lampin	Robert Hossein, Marina Vlady	Crime	
Daddy's Gang	Guy Lefranc	Fernand Raynaud, Louis de Funès	Comedy	
Deadlier Than the Male	Julien Duvivier	Jean Gabin, Daniele Delorme	Crime	
Death in the Garden	Luis Buñuel	Simone Signoret, Charles Vanel	Drama	
Diamond Machine	Pierre Chevalier	Eddie Constantine, Maria Frau, François Perrot	Crime	Co-production with Italy
Don Juan	John Berry	Fernandel, Carmen Sevilla, Roland Armontel	Historical comedy	Co-production with Italy and Spain
Elena and Her Men	Jean Renoir	Ingrid Bergman	Comedy drama	
Fernand Cowboy	Guy Lefranc	Fernand Raynaud, Noël Roquevert, Nadine Tallier	Comedy western	
Fernandel the Dressmaker	Jean Boyer	Fernandel, Suzy Delair, Fred Pasquali	Comedy	
Forgive Us Our Trespasses	Robert Hossein	Marina Vlady, Pierre Vaneck, Giani Esposito	Drama	
The Gangsters	Carlo Rim	Eddie Constantine, Noël-Noël, Jean Richard, Yves Robert	Comedy crime	
Gervaise	René Clément	Maria Schell, François Périer	Drama historical	Nominated for Oscar, +7 wins, +2 nom.
Goubbiah, mon amour	Robert Darène	Jean Marais, Kerima, Delia Scala	Adventure drama	Co-production wit Italy
Guilty?	Edmond T. Gréville	John Justin, Barbara Laage, Donald Wolfit	Crime	Co-production with United Kingdom
Honoré de Marseille	Maurice Régamey	Fernandel	Comedy, Musical	
The Hunchback of Notre Dame	Jean Delanoy	Anthony Quinn, Gina Lollobrigida	Horror	
If All the Guys in the World	Christian-Jaque	André Valmy, Jean Gaven, Marc Cassot, Georges Poujouly, Doudou Babet	Adventure	
If Paris Were Told to Us	Sacha Guitry	Françoise Arnoul	Comedy / Drama	
In the Manner of Sherlock Holmes	Henri Lepage	Henri Vilbert, Claude Sylvain, Michel Ardan	Crime	
It Happened in Aden	Michel Boisrond	André Luguet, Jacques Dacqmine, Dany Robin	Comedy	
Je reviendrai à Kandara	Victor Vicas	François Périer, Daniel Gélin, Bella Darvi	Drama	
La Traversée de Paris	Claude Autant-Lara	Jean Gabin, Bourvil	Comedy / Drama	
Les Assassins du dimanche	Alex Joffé	Barbara Laage, Dominique Wilms, Jean-Marc Thibault, Paul Frankeur	Drama	
The Light Across the Street	Georges Lacombe	Raymond Pellegrin, Roger Pigaut, Brigitte Bardot	Crime	
Maigret Leads the Investigation	Stany Cordier	Maurice Manson, Peter Walker, Michel André, Svetlana Pitoëff	Crime	
Man and Child	Raoul André	Eddie Constantine, Juliette Gréco	Crime	Co-production with Italy
A Man Escaped	Robert Bresson	François Leterrier	Adventure drama	Nominated for BAFTA, +2 wins, +1 nom.
Mannequins of Paris	André Hunebelle	Madeleine Robinson, Ivan Desny, Mischa Auer	Drama	
The Man with the Golden Keys	Léo Joannon	Pierre Fresnay, Annie Girardot	Crime	
Marie Antoinette Queen of France	Jean Delannoy	Michèle Morgan, Richard Todd	Historical	Entered into the 1956 Cannes Film Festival
Meeting in Paris	Georges Lampin	Robert Lamoureux, Betsy Blair	Comedy	
Memories of a Cop	Pierre Foucaud, Andre Hunebelle	Michel Simon, Suzy Prim	Crime	
Michel Strogoff	Carmine Gallone	Curd Jürgens, Geneviève Page, Sylva Koscina	Adventure	Co-production with Italy
Miss Catastrophe	Dimitri Kirsanoff	Sophie Desmarets, Philippe Nicaud, Louis Seigner, Armand Bernard	Comedy	
Missing Persons Section	Pierre Chenal	Nicole Maurey, Maurice Ronet	Crime	Co-production with Argentina
My Priest Among the Poor	Henri Diamant-Berger	Yves Deniaud, Raymond Bussières, Arletty	Comedy	
The Mystery of Picasso	Henri-Georges Clouzot	Pablo Picasso	Documentary	
Naughty Girl	Michel Boisrond	Brigitte Bardot	Musical	
Paris, Palace Hotel	Henri Verneuil	Charles Boyer, Françoise Arnoul, Tilda Thamar	Comedy	Co-production with Italy
People of No Importance	Henri Verneuil	Jean Gabin, Françoise Arnoul	Drama	
Pity for the Vamps	Jean Josipovici	Viviane Romance, Geneviève Kervine, Yves Vincent	Drama	
Plucking the Daisy	Marc Allégret	Daniel Gélin, Brigitte Bardot	Comedy	
The Red Balloon	Albert Lamorisse	Pascal Lamorisse	Fantasy (short)	Won Oscar, +3 wins
The Road to Paradise	Willi Forst, Hans Wolff	Georges Guétary, Christine Carère, Claude Farell	Comedy	
Short Head	Norbert Carbonnaux	Fernand Gravey, Micheline Dax, Jean Richard	Comedy	
The Silent World	Jacques-Yves Cousteau; Louis Malle		Documentary	Won Oscar, +3 wins, +1 nomination
La Sorcière	André Michel	Marina Vladi	Horror	Entered into the 6th Berlin International Film Festival; Co-production with Sweden
Suspicion	Pierre Billon	Anne Vernon, Frank Villard, Dora Doll	Crime	
The Terror with Women	Jean Boyer	Noël-Noël, Jacqueline Gauthier, Yves Robert	Comedy	
This is Called Dawn	Luis Buñuel	Georges Marchal, Lucia Bosè	Crime	Co-production with Italy
Tides of Passion	Jean Stelli	Etchika Choureau, Jean Danet, Dora Doll	Drama	Co-production with Italy
Tonight the Skirts Fly	Dimitri Kirsanoff	Sophie Desmarets, Brigitte Auber, Jean Chevrier, Anne Vernon	Action, Comedy, Drama	
The Wagas of Sin	Denys de La Patellière	Danielle Darrieux, Jean-Claude Pascal, Jeanne Moreau	Drama	
The Whole Town Accuses	Claude Boissol	Jean Marais, Etchika Choureau, Noël Roquevert	Comedy drama	
Zaza	René Gaveau	Lilo, Maurice Teynac, Robert Dalban	Drama	

== See also ==
- 1956 in France
- 1956 in French television
