= List of French films of 1955 =

A list of films produced in France in 1955.

Title	Director	Cast	Genre	Notes
The Affair of the Poisons	Henri Decoin	Danielle Darrieux, Viviane Romance, Paul Meurisse	Historical	Co-production with Italy
A Missionary	Maurice Cloche	Yves Massard, Marie-France Planèze, René Blancard	Drama	
A Splendid Girl	Raoul André	Raymond Rouleau, Sophie Desmarets	Comedy	
The Aristocrats	Denys de La Patellière	Pierre Fresnay, Brigitte Auber, François Guérin, Georges Descrières, Maurice Ronet, Jacques Dacqmine	Comedy drama	
The Babes Make the Law	Raoul André	Claudine Dupuis, Dominique Wilms, Louise Carletti	Comedy thriller	
Bad Liaisons	Alexandre Astruc	Jean-Claude Pascal, Anouk Aimée, Philippe Lemaire	Drama	
Black Dossier	André Cayatte	Jean-Marc Bory, Bernard Blier, Antoine Balpêtré	Drama	French-Italian co-production
Blackmail	Guy Lefranc	Raymond Pellegrin, Magali Noël, Leo Genn	Crime	
Caroline and the Rebels	Jean Devaivre	Jean-Claude Pascal, Sophie Desmarets, Brigitte Bardot	Historical	
Chéri-Bibi	Marcello Pagliero	Jean Richard, Lea Padovani, Danielle Godet	Adventure	Co-production with Italy
Les Diaboliques	Henri-Georges Clouzot	Paul Meurisse, Simone Signoret, Véra Clouzot	Horror	
The Duratons	André Berthomieu	Jane Sourza, Claude Nicot, Jean Carmet	Comedy	
Eighteen Hour Stopover	René Jolivet	Jean-Pierre Aumont, Geneviève Kervine, Georges Marchal	Crime	
Four Days in Paris	André Berthomieu	Luis Mariano, Geneviève Kervine, Jane Sourza	Musical	
Fruits of Summer	Raymond Bernard	Edwige Feuillère, Henri Guisol, Etchika Choureau	Comedy	Co-production with West Germany
The Fugitives	Jean-Paul Le Chanois	Pierre Fresnay, François Périer, Michel André	War	
Gas-Oil	Gilles Grangier	Jean Gabin, Jeanne Moreau, Ginette Leclerc	Crime	
Give 'em Hell	John Berry	Eddie Constantine, May Britt, Jean Danet, Lyla Rocco	Crime	Co-production with Italy
The Grand Maneuver	René Clair	Michèle Morgan, Gérard Philipe, Jean Desailly	Comedy, Drama, romance	French-Italian co-production
The Heroes Are Tired	Yves Ciampi	Yves Montand, María Félix, Jean Servais	Adventure	Co-production with West Germany
The Hotshot	Dimitri Kirsanoff	Marina Vlady, Raymond Pellegrin, Dora Doll	Crime	
House on the Waterfront	Edmond T. Gréville	Jean Gabin, Andrée Debar, Henri Vidal	Drama	
Les Hussards	Alex Joffe	Bernard Blier, André Bourvil, Louis de Funès	Comedy	
Il bidone	Federico Fellini	Broderick Crawford, Richard Basehart, Franco Fabrizi	Comedy-drama	Italian-French co-production
The Impossible Mr. Pipelet	André Hunebelle	Michel Simon, Etchika Choureau	Comedy drama	
The Infiltrator	Pierre Foucaud	Henri Vidal, Monique van Vooren	Crime	
Je suis un sentimental	John Berry	Eddie Constantine, Bella Darvi, Aimé Clariond	Crime	
La Pointe Courte	Agnès Varda	Silvia Monfort, Philippe Noiret	Comedy-drama	
Lady Chatterley's Lover	Marc Allégret	Danielle Darrieux, Erno Crisa, Leo Genn	Drama, romance	
The Little Rebels	Jean Delannoy	Jean Gabin, Anne Doat, Dora Doll	Drama	Co-production with Italy
The Living Bread	Jean Mousselle	Françoise Goléa, Jean-François Calvé, Jean Muselli, Lucien Nat	Comedy drama	
Looking for the Woman	Raoul André	Georges Marchal, Geneviève Page	Action comedy	
Lola Montès	Max Ophüls	Martine Carol, Peter Ustinov, Anton Walbrook	Drama	French-West German co-production
Lord Rogue	André Haguet	Jean-Claude Pascal, Lucienne Legrand, Julien Bertheau	Historical comedy	
Love at Night	Pierre Méré	Isabelle Pia, Christian Marquand,	Crime	
The Lovers of Lisbon	Henri Verneuil	Daniel Gélin, Françoise Arnoul, Trevor Howard	Drama	
Madelon	Jean Boyer	Line Renaud, Jean Richard, Roger Pierre	Comedy	
Mademoiselle from Paris	Walter Kapps	Jean-Pierre Aumont, Gisèle Pascal, Nadine Basile	Comedy	
Magic Village	Jean-Paul Le Chanois	Robert Lamoureux, Lucia Bosè	Comedy	Co-production with Italy
Marguerite de la nuit	Claude Autant-Lara	Michèle Morgan, Yves Montand, Massimo Girotti	Drama, Fantasy, Romance	Co-production with Italy
Marianne of My Youth	Julien Duvivier	Marianne Hold, Pierre Vaneck, Jean Yonnel	Drama, romance, fantasy	Co-production with West Germany
Men in White	Ralph Habib	Raymond Pellegrin, Jeanne Moreau, Jean Chevrier, Fernand Ledoux	Drama	
Montmartre Nights	Pierre Franchi	Jean-Marc Thibault, Louis Seigner, Geneviève Kervine	Crime	
More Whiskey for Callaghan	Willy Rozier	Tony Wright, Magali Vendeuil, Robert Berri	Thriller	
Mr. Arkadin	Orson Welles	Orson Welles, Robert Arden, Patricia Medina	Mystery	French-Spanish-British co-production
Nagana	Hervé Bromberger	Barbara Laage, Renato Baldini, Gabrielle Dorziat	Adventure	Co-production with Italy
Nana	Christian-Jacque	Charles Boyer, Martine Carol	Historical	Co-production with Italy
Napoléon	Sacha Guitry	Raymond Pellegrin, Daniel Gélin, Sacha Guitry	Historical	Co-production with Italy
Night and Fog	Alain Resnais		Documentary	
No Big Deal for Johnny	Émile Roussel	Dominique Wilms, Armand Mestral, Le Petit John	Crime drama	
No Mice in Business	Henri Lepage	Geneviève Kervine, Renaud Mary, Robert Berri, Gérard Séty	Crime	
No Morals	André Pergament	Jeanne Moreau, Philippe Lemaire, Roger Pierre	Drama	
Papa, maman, ma femme et moi	Jean-Paul Le Chanois	Robert Lamoureux, Gaby Morlay, Fernand Ledoux, Nicole Courcel	Comedy	
Passion for Women	Hans Herwig	Nadine Alari, Jean-Pierre Kérien, Micheline Francey, Paul Dupuis	Comedy drama	
Pleasures and Vices	Marcel Blistène	Viviane Romance, Maurice Ronet, Geneviève Kervine	Drama	
The Price of Love	Maurice de Canonge	Claude Laydu, Joëlle Bernard, Pierre Destailles, Renaud Mary	Crime	
The Ragpickers of Emmaus	Robert Darène	Edwige Bart, Dany Carrel, Solange Certain, Marie d'Hyvert, Gaby Morlay, Madeleine Robinson	Comedy drama	
Razzia sur la chnouf	Henri Decoin	Jean Gabin, Marcel Dalio, Magali Noël	Crime	
The Red Cloak	Giuseppe Maria Scotese	Patricia Medina, Fausto Tozzi, Jean Murat	Adventure	Co-production with Italy
Rififi	Jules Dassin	Jean Servais, Carl Möhner, Robert Manuel	Crime	
Scandal in Montmartre	Alfred Rode	Claudine Dupuis, Philippe Nicaud, Dany Carrel	Crime	
Sophie and the Crime	Pierre Gaspard-Huit	Marina Vlady, Peter van Eyck, Dora Doll	Crime	
Square Fortune	Bernard Borderie	Pedro Armendáriz, Paul Meurisse, Fernand Ledoux, Folco Lulli	Adventure	Co-production with Italy
Spring, Autumn and Love	Gilles Grangier	Fernandel, Nicole Berger, Georges Chamarat	Comedy	Co-production with Italy
Stopover in Orly	Jean Dréville	Dany Robin, Dieter Borsche, Heinz Rühmann	Romance	Co-production with West Germany
Three of the Canebière	Maurice de Canonge	Marcel Merkès, Colette Deréal, Jeannette Batti, Colette Ripert, Henri Génès	Comedy	
Thirteen at the Table	André Hunebelle	Micheline Presle, Fernand Gravey, Germaine Montero	Comedy	
Tower of Lust	Abel Gance	Pierre Brasseur, Silvana Pampanini	Drama, historical	Co-production with Italy
The Wicked Go to Hell	Robert Hossein	Marina Vlady, Henri Vidal	Crime	
The Widow	Lewis Milestone	Patricia Roc, Massimo Serato, Anna Maria Ferrero	Drama	French-Italian co-production
Your Turn, Callaghan	Willy Rozier	Tony Wright, Lysiane Rey, Colette Ripert	Crime	

== See also ==
- 1955 in France
- 1955 in French television
