= List of Spanish films of 1958 =

A list of films produced in Spain in 1958 (see 1958 in film).

== 1958 ==
Title	Director	Cast	Genre	Notes
1958
Cuatro en la frontera	Antonio Santillán	Claudine Dupuis, Danielle Godet and Estanis González	Crime	
Let's Make the Impossible!	Rafael Gil	Paquita Rico	Comedy	Entered into the 8th Berlin International Film Festival
La vida por delante	Fernando Fernán Gómez	Fernando Fernán Gómez, Analía Gadé, Manuel Alexandre	Comedy	Spanish Neorealism
The Violet Seller	Luis César Amadori	Sara Montiel, Raf Vallone, Frank Villard, Tomás Blanco and Ana Mariscal	Musical	Huge blockbuster
Vengeance	Juan Antonio Bardem	Raf Vallone, Carmen Sevilla, Manuel Alexandre	Drama	Academy Award nominee and entered into the 1958 Cannes Film Festival
