= Lud Germain =

Haitian actor and singer

Lud Germain, "Ludovic Germain" was a Haitian actor and singer, probably naturalized French. He is best known for his role in L'Auberge Rouge (The Red Inn) (1951) as Fétiche.

He died in France in January 2015.

== Biography ==
Lud Germain probably arrived in France around the beginning of the 1930s.

In 1937, he was part of the "Haitian Trio", a musical ensemble that performed at the Pavilion of Haiti at the International Exhibition of Arts and Techniques of Paris. This trio consisted of Bertin Depestre Salnave (flute, saxophone), Lud Germain (vocals), Maurice Thibault (piano).

== Filmography ==
Cinema

- 1942 : L'Amant de Bornéo de Jean-Pierre Feydeau et René Le Hénaff - (rôle non crédité)
- 1946 : 120, rue de la Gare de Léo Malet - Toussaint (rôle non crédité)
- 1948 : Émile l'Africain de Robert Vernay - Bimbo
- 1950 : Plus de vacances pour le Bon Dieu de Robert Vernay
- 1950 : Pipe chien de Henri Verneuil (court métrage)
- 1951 : L'Auberge rouge de Claude Autant-Lara - Fétiche
- 1952 : Massacre en dentelles de André Hunebelle - Sam Barnett
- 1952 : Elle et moi de Guy Lefranc - Bouboudou
- 1953 : Mon frangin du Sénégal de Guy Lacourt - le Noir engagé comme commis
- 1953 : La môme vert de gris de Bernard Borderie - le domestique de Harley Chase (rôle non crédité)
- 1953 : Lettre ouverte de Alex Joffé
- 1958 : Maxime de Henri Verneuil : le serviteur noir
- 1958 : Vive les vacances de Jean-Marc Thibault - Kikouyou
- 1959 : I Spit on Your Grave de Michel Gast - Harrison, le serviteur des Shannon
- 1959 : Checkerboard de Claude Bernard-Aubert - (rôle non crédité)
- 1959 : Les Motards de Jean Laviron
- 1960 : Les Jeux de l'amour de Philippe de Broca
- 1961 : The Nina B. Affair de Robert Siodmak : un Africain lors de la conférence
- 1961 : Le Rendez-vous de Jean Delannoy

Television

- 1958 : Hôtel des neiges, téléfilm de Jean Vernier - Zazaquel
- 1961 : Épreuves à l'appui (Les Cinq Dernières Minutes nº 21) de Claude Loursais (série TV) - Le cordonnier
- 1965 : Rocambole - épisode : La Belle jardinière (série TV)

== Dubbing ==
- Everett Brown - Grand Sam : Autant en emporte le vent (1939)
- Clarence Muse - Jehu : Quand les tambours s'arrêteront (1951)
- Ben Johnson - Kimani : Simba (1955)

== Music ==
Album: Mississipi (1950)
