= Jacques Jansen =

French opera singer

Jacques Jansen (né Toupin; born Paris, 22 November 1913 – 13 March 2002) was a French baryton-martin singer, particularly associated with the role of Pelléas in the opera by Debussy, but also active in operetta and on the concert platform, and later as a teacher.

== Life and career ==
Jansen had a wide musical and artistic education; after studying the violin in Paris, he took lessons in solfège and bassoon at the conservatoire in Tours, where he also pursued courses in fine arts.

Having taken vocal lessons with Charles Panzéra, from 1938 he studied under Claire Croiza and Georges Viseur (solfège) at the Paris Conservatoire. He also took classes with René Simon and Louis Jouvet and won prizes which might have allowed him to follow a career in acting. In 1939 he sang the fountain scene (Act 2 scene 1) and the tower scene (Act 3 scene 1) of Claude Debussy's opera Pelléas et Mélisande with the Orchestre National de France under Inghelbrecht, an experience which left him overwhelmed with joy.

He made his debut as Pelléas at the Grand Théâtre de Genève in 1941.

After his Paris debut at the Opéra-Comique as Pelléas on 20 April 1941, Jansen also appeared as a singer in Fauré's Masques et bergamasques (January 1942), Valérien in Malvina (July 1945) and the title role in Fragonard (February 1946).

Jansen recorded Pelléas in an Opéra-Comique cast under the conductor Roger Désormière in April and May 1941 with Irène Joachim as Mélisande. This recording is widely considered as a reference recording of this opera. Jansen later recorded the same role under André Cluytens and Inghelbrecht. He also sang the role under Désormière with the Opéra-Comique company at Covent Garden in June 1949, as well as in New York, Brussels, Lisbon, Berlin, Milan, Rome and Tokyo. Having already appeared in three films, he was also considered for the role of popular singer Jacques Sartory in the 1945 crime drama film Seul dans la nuit, before being passed over for Jacques Pills.

His last performance was in Tours in March 1971.

Although best remembered for the role of Pelléas he also sang baroque opera (Les Indes galantes and Platée by Jean-Philippe Rameau), modern opera (Christophe Colomb by Darius Milhaud and Les caprices de Marianne at the Théâtre des Champs-Élysées in 1956), operetta (The Merry Widow by Franz Lehár, the premiere of La Belle de Paris by Georges Van Parys in 1961 and Antonin in Ciboulette in Geneva) and mélodies. Jansen was a magnetic interpreter of Danilo in The Merry Widow, which he performed some 1,500 times in France, displaying his acting skills, which he also used in several films. He dubbed the singing voice of Alain Cuny in Les Visiteurs du Soir (1942).

He was for five years professor at the Conservatoire in Marseille, then held a similar post at the Paris Conservatoire, finally teaching vocal technique at the Opéra-Studio.

== Discography ==
Besides the three recordings of Pelléas et Mélisande, Jansen's discography includes Frédéric in a complete Lakmé. He recorded selections from Véronique with Yvonne Printemps in 1941, The Merry Widow in 1953, Ta bouche in 1956, and Fragonard in 1957. In 1952 he recorded a recital for Decca of Ravel, Debussy, Chabrier and Hahn (LXT2774) and songs by Schubert, Jaubert, Beydts, and Françaix.

== Filmography ==
- 1942 : Patricia by Paul Mesnier
- 1944 : La Malibran by Sacha Guitry
- 1944 : Bonsoir mesdames, bonsoir messieurs by Roland Tual
- 1949 : La Ronde des heures by Alexandre Ryder
- 1972 : Figaro-ci, Figaro-là by Hervé Bromberger (TV)
