= My Childish Father =

My Childish Father may refer to:

- My Childish Father (1930 film), French film
- My Childish Father (1953 film), French film
