= The Dream of Andalusia =

- Directed by: Luis Lucia
- Written by: Jean-Pierre Feydeau; Robert Vernay; Raymond Vincy; Albert Willemetz; Luis Lucia
- Starring: Luis Mariano; Carmen Sevilla; Arlette Poirier
- Cinematography: Cecilio Paniagua
- Music by: Francis Lopez
- Release date: 1951
- Running time: 94 minutes
- Countries: Spain; France
- Language: Spanish

The Dream of Andalusia (Spanish: El sueño de Andalucía) is a 1951 Spanish-French musical film directed by Luis Lucia and starring Luis Mariano, Carmen Sevilla and Arlette Poirier. A separate French film version Andalusia was also made.

== Plot ==
Luis Mariano is Juanito, an itinerant botijero full of good humor who likes to sing and bullfighting. Carmen Sevilla is Dolores, the daughter of the owner of an inn who is fond of dancing. To prevent everything from being too excessive, the clever ending tells us that we are in a movie within a movie.

== Cast ==
- Luis Mariano as Juanito Var
- Carmen Sevilla as Dolores
- Arlette Poirier as Fanny Miller
- Perrette Souplex as Pilar
- Liliane Bert as Greta
- Andrée Moreau as Doña Augustias
- José Nieto as Vicente
- Enrique Guitart as Rodríguez Valiente
- Fernando Sancho
- Léon Berton as The secretary
- Jean Berton as The chief of police
- Janine Zorelli
- Alexandre Rignault as Pancho
- Robert Arnoux as Schnell
- Noël Roquevert as Ricardo Garcia
- Maurice Baquet as Pepe
- Marujita Díaz
- Carolina Giménez
- Cándida Losada
- Antonio Casal
- Luisa Sala
- Jacques B. Brunius
- Cadex
- Henri Coutet as The captain
- Renée Couture
- Paul Demange as Director
- Pierre Flourens
- Lucien Guervil
- Mejoto-Benideus
- Daniel Mendaille as Doctor
- Morant
- Mireille Ozy
- Roseline Prince
- Yvonne Yma

== Bibliography ==
- Mira, Alberto. The A to Z of Spanish Cinema. Rowman & Littlefield, 2010.
