= Fandango (1949 film) =

1949 film directed by Emil E. Reinert

- Directed by: Emil E. Reinert
- Written by: Gérard Carlier; Jean-Paul Le Chanois; André Tabet
- Produced by: Guy Lacourt
- Starring: Luis Mariano; Ludmilla Tchérina; Annette Poivre
- Cinematography: Roger Dormoy
- Edited by: Victoria Mercanton
- Music by: Francis Lopez
- Production companies: Les Films Gloria; Olympia Film
- Distributed by: Héraut Film
- Release date: 18 February 1949
- Running time: 90 minutes
- Country: France
- Language: French

Fandango is a 1949 French musical film directed by Emil E. Reinert and starring Luis Mariano, Ludmilla Tchérina and Annette Poivre. It was shot at the Victorine Studios in Nice. The film's sets were designed by the art director Jean Douarinou.

== Synopsis ==
In the Basque Country two friends are in love with the woman of an inn they frequent. Things are thrown into doubt when one of them is offered the chance to launch a singing career in Paris.

== Cast ==
- Luis Mariano as José
- Ludmilla Tchérina as Angélica
- Raymond Bussières as François
- Annette Poivre as Annette
- Edmond Audran as Paul
- Fernand Rauzéna as M. Carlo
- Georgette Tissier as La mariée
- Jean Tissier as M. Fleur
- Lucien Callamand as Le beau-père
- Robert Dalban as L'inspecteur
- Claire Gérard as La grand-mère
- Hennery as Bouffartigue
- Liliane Lesaffre as Une invitée
- Jean-François Martial as L'ingénieur
- Jean Gabert
- Gary Garland
- Lucette Morenier

== Bibliography ==
- Creekmur, Corey & Mokdad, Linda. The International Film Musical. Edinburgh University Press, 2012.
