= I Like Only You =

1949 film

- Directed by: Pierre Montazel
- Written by: Pierre Montazel
- Based on: Le Suiveur de Madame by Jean Montazel
- Produced by: Guy Lacourt
- Starring: Luis Mariano; Martine Carol; André Le Gall
- Cinematography: Roger Dormoy
- Edited by: Madeleine Gug
- Music by: Francis Lopez
- Production company: Les Films Gloria
- Distributed by: Dispas – Sonodis
- Release date: 30 June 1949
- Running time: 93 minutes
- Country: France
- Language: French

I Like Only You (French: Je n'aime que toi) is a 1949 French comedy film directed by Pierre Montazel, and starring by Luis Mariano, Martine Carol and André Le Gall. It was shot at the Cité Elgé Studios in Paris. The film's sets were designed by the art director Jean d'Eaubonne.

== Synopsis ==
Irène is married to the celebrated singer Renaldo Cortez who is completely devoted to his work. Frustrated she goes off with another man and Renaldo enlists the help of his faithful friend Arthur to return her to him so they can reconcile.

== Cast ==
- Luis Mariano as Renaldo Cortez, singer, husband of Irène
- Martine Carol as Irène, wife of Don Renaldo
- André Le Gall as Gérard
- Robert Dhéry as Arthur Bidois
- Raymond Bussières as Ernest
- Annette Poivre as Julia, maidservant of Don Renaldo
- Edmond Ardisson as Le chauffeur
- Louis de Funès as pianist of the orchestra
- René Berthier as Le secrétaire
- Jean Richard as Un passager de l'avion
- Gaston Orbal as Le maître d'hôtel
- Joé Davray as Un garçon de café
- Roger Saget as Le présentateur
- Pierrette Rossi as Une admiratrice
- Colette Georges as Une admiratrice
- Paul Azaïs as Le compositeur
- Colette Brosset as Monrival
- Jean Carmet as Le père affolé
- Roger Pierre as Un journaliste d'Ici Paris
- Jean-Marc Thibault as journaliste d'Ici Paris

== Bibliography ==
- Goble, Alan. The Complete Index to Literary Sources in Film. Walter de Gruyter, 1999.
- Powrie, Phil & Cadalanu, Marie . The French Film Musical. Bloomsbury Publishing, 2020.
