= Pierre Berton (disambiguation) =

Pierre Berton (1920–2004) was a Canadian author of non-fiction and a well-known television personality and journalist.

Pierre Berton is also the name of:

- Pierre Berton (playwright) (1842–1912), 19th century playwright, co-author of the play Zaza
- Pierre Montan Berton (1727–1780), French composer and father of composer Henri Montan Berton

== See also ==
- Pierre Bertin (1891–1984), French stage and film actor
