= 1955 in France =

- Decades: 1930s; 1940s; 1950s; 1960s; 1970s
- See also: History of France; Timeline of French history; List of years in France

Events from the year 1955 in France.

== Incumbents ==
- President: Rene Coty
- President of the Council of Ministers:
  - until 17 February: Pierre Mendès France
  - 17 February-23 February: Christian Pineau
  - starting 23 February: Edgar Faure

== Events ==
- 28 March – SNCF sets a new world rail speed record of 331 km/h using electric traction.
- 5 May – Bonn–Paris conventions come into force, putting an end to the Allied occupation of West Germany.
- 11 June – 1955 Le Mans disaster. Driver Pierre Levegh and 82 spectators killed in a crash during the 1955 24 Hours of Le Mans race.
- 28 July – The first Interlingua congress in Tours, France, leads to the founding of the Union Mundial pro Interlingua.
- 28 August – Murder of Janet Marshall.
- 6 October – The Citroen DS, a large saloon car, is launched at the Paris Motor Show.

== Arts and literature ==
- 25 June – Notre Dame du Haut in Ronchamp, designed by Le Corbusier, is dedicated.
- 15 September – Vladimir Nabokov's Lolita is published in Paris by Olympia Press.

== Sport ==
- 7 July – Tour de France begins.
- 30 July – Tour de France ends, won by Louison Bobet.

== Births ==
- 28 January
  - Nicolas Sarkozy, President of France
  - Chantal Sébire, teacher and euthanasia campaigner (died 2008)
- 24 February – Alain Prost, motor racing driver
- 4 March – Dominique Pinon, actor
- 9 March – Jean-Luc Arribart, soccer player
- 17 March – Élie Baup, soccer player and manager
- 21 June – Michel Platini, soccer player
- 27 June – Isabelle Adjani, actress
- 2 August – Anne Lacaton, architect
- 7 August – Chantal Réga, athlete
- 24 August – Sylvie Perrinjaquet, politician
- 8 September – Olivia Dutron, actress
- 17 September – Olivier Chandon de Brailles, motor racing driver (died 1983)
- 7 October – Yo-Yo Ma, cellist
- 14 December – Hervé Guibert, writer (died 1991)

== Deaths ==
- 15 January – Yves Tanguy, surrealist painter (born 1900)
- 23 February – Paul Claudel, poet, dramatist and diplomat (born 1868)
- 22 March – Maurice Schutz, actor (born 1866)
- 19 June – Adrienne Monnier, poet and publisher (born 1892)
- 5 November – Maurice Utrillo, painter (born 1883)
- 27 November – Arthur Honegger, composer (born 1892)

== See also ==
- List of French films of 1955
- 1955 in French television
