= Adventures of the Barber of Seville =

1954 film

- Film poster
- Directed by: Ladislao Vajda
- Written by: Jesús María de Arozamena; Alex Joffé; Jean Marsan; Cesare Sterbini
- Based on: The Barber of Seville by Pierre Beaumarchais
- Produced by: Pierre Gérin; Benito Perojo; Miguel Tudela
- Starring: Luis Mariano; Lolita Sevilla; Danielle Godet
- Cinematography: Antonio L. Ballesteros
- Edited by: Antonio Ramírez de Loaysa; Henri Taverna
- Music by: Francis Lopez
- Production companies: Producciones Benito Perojo; Les Productions Cinématographiques; Mars Film
- Distributed by: CIFESA
- Release date: 1954
- Running time: 92 minutes
- Countries: Spain; France
- Language: Spanish

Adventures of the Barber of Seville (French: L'aventurier de Séville, Spanish: Aventuras del barbero de Sevilla) is a 1954 Spanish-French comedy film directed by Ladislao Vajda and starring Luis Mariano, Lolita Sevilla and Danielle Godet. It was entered into the 1954 Cannes Film Festival.

== Plot ==
Figaro, a singing barber, gets caught by bandits who use his abilities to lure travelers. To escape justice he joins the army. Meanwhile, the bandits are captured and given a stark choice by the authorities - death by garrote or join the army. Both the bandits and Figaro end up serving in the same military company. They are shipped to Puerto Rico and fight pirates and English ships. They return to Spain with acclaim. Now he will know the rich salons and the bright side of life.

== Cast ==
- Luis Mariano as Fígaro
- Lolita Sevilla as Pepilla
- Danielle Godet as Rosina
- José Isbert as Don Faustino
- Emma Penella as Duquesa de San Tirso
- Miguel Gila as Sargento
- Jean Galland as Don Bartolo
- Juan Calvo as El Cartujano
- José María Rodero as Conde de Almaviva
- Fernando Sancho as Sir Albert
- Pierre Cour as Mellao
- Antonio Riquelme as Cabo de alguaciles
- Mariano Asquerino as L'Amiral
- Raúl Cancio as Rubio
- Carmen Sánchez as Doña Rosa
- Joaquín Roa as Bandido novato
- Carlos Díaz de Mendoza as Capitán
- Antonio Padilla as Saltamontes
- José Gómiz as Educao
- Juanita Azores as Señora en la barbería (as Juana Azores)
- Luis Rivera as Señor en la barbería
- Emilio Santiago as Barbero 2º
- Ángel Álvarez as Dueño de la posada

== See also ==
- The Barber of Seville, 1775 play
