= Zaza (1923 film) =

1923 film by Allan Dwan

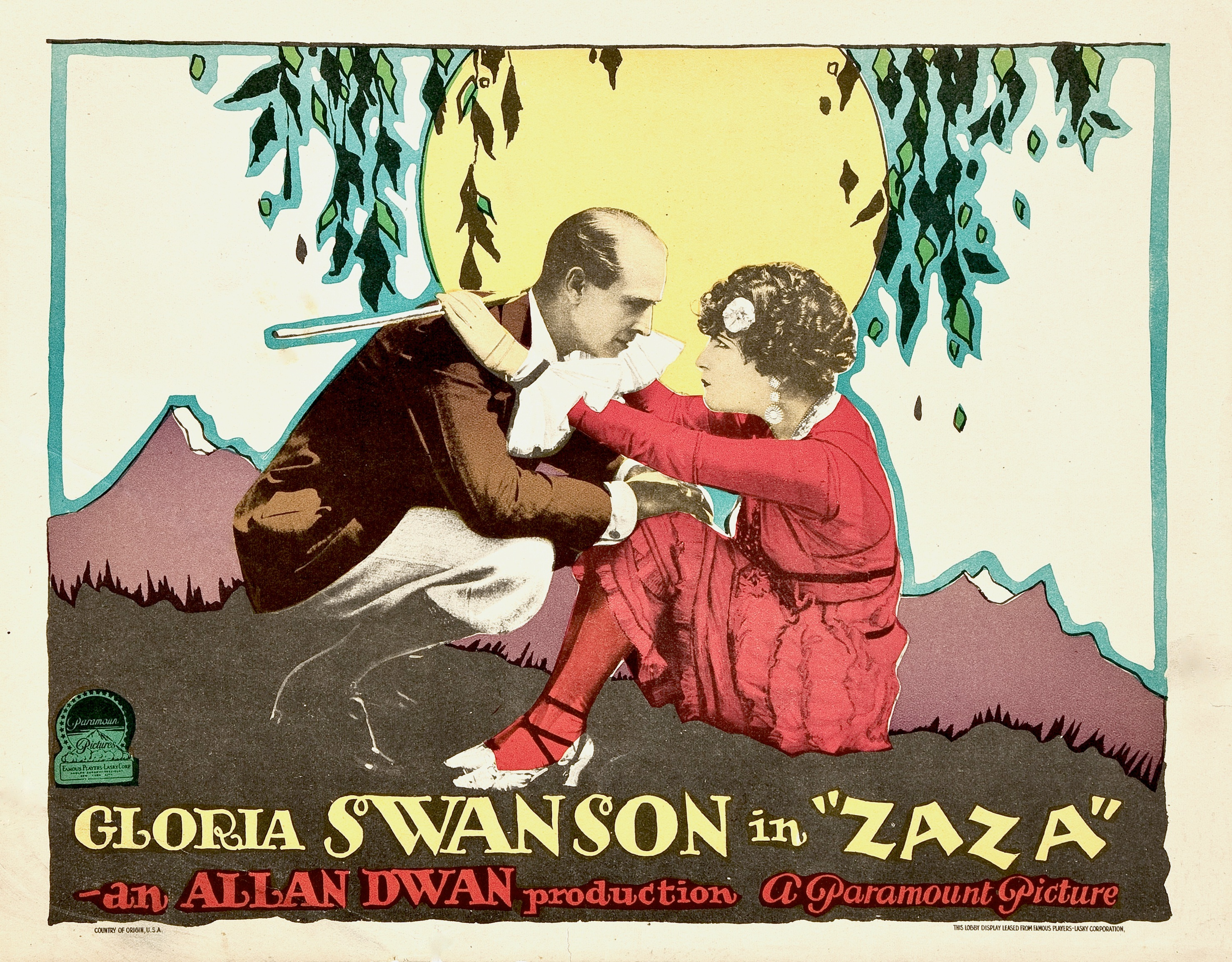
- 1923 lobby card
- Directed by: Allan Dwan
- Written by: Le Vino
- Based on: Zaza by Pierre Berton and Charles Simon
- Produced by: Allan Dwan
- Starring: Gloria Swanson; H. B. Warner; Lucille La Verne
- Cinematography: Harold Rosson
- Distributed by: Paramount Pictures
- Release date: September 16, 1923
- Running time: 84 mins.
- Country: United States
- Language: Silent (English intertitles)

Zaza is a 1923 American silent romantic drama film directed and produced by Allan Dwan, and starring Gloria Swanson. This film is based on the 1899 French play of the same name produced on Broadway by David Belasco and starring Mrs. Leslie Carter. The film was shot at Paramount's Astoria Studios in New York City.

A previous film version was released by Paramount in 1915 starring Pauline Frederick. A third version, directed by George Cukor and starring Claudette Colbert, was released in 1939.

Full film

== Cast ==
- Gloria Swanson as Zaza
- H. B. Warner as Bernard Dufresne
- Ferdinand Gottschalk as Duke de Brissac
- Lucille La Verne as Aunt Rosa
- Mary Thurman as Florianne
- Yvonne Hughes as Nathalie, Zaza's maid
- Riley Hatch as Rigault
- L. Rogers Lytton as Stage Manager (credited as Roger Lytton)
- Ivan Linow as Apache
- Florence Fair as Madame Dufresne (uncredited)
- Helen Mack as Lucille Dufresne (uncredited)
- Ethel Barrymore as Woman at table in cafe (uncredited)

== Preservation ==
A print of Zaza is housed at the George Eastman House and the Library of Congress.
