= Zaza (1938 film) =

1938 film by George Cukor

- Theatrical poster
- Directed by: George Cukor
- Screenplay by: Zoë Akins; Jules Furthman (uncredited)
- Based on: Zaza by Pierre Berton and Charles Simon
- Produced by: Albert Lewin Production consultant Alla Nazimova
- Starring: Claudette Colbert; Herbert Marshall; Bert Lahr; Helen Westley; Constance Collier; Genevieve Tobin; Walter Catlett
- Cinematography: Charles Lang
- Edited by: Edward Dmytryk
- Music by: Frederick Hollander
- Production company: Paramount Pictures
- Distributed by: Paramount Pictures
- Release dates: December 29, 1938 (Los Angeles); January 4, 1939 (New York City); January 14, 1939 (United States)
- Running time: 83 min.
- Country: United States
- Language: English

Zaza is a 1938 American romantic drama film made by Paramount Pictures, and directed by George Cukor. The screenplay was written by Zoë Akins, based on the play Zaza. The music score is by Frederick Hollander. The film stars Claudette Colbert (who had replaced Isa Miranda) and Herbert Marshall.

The story was filmed by Paramount in a 1915 version with Pauline Frederick, and previously remade in 1923 with Gloria Swanson.

== Plot ==
A glamorous female singer has an affair with a married man.

== Cast ==
- Claudette Colbert as Zaza
- Herbert Marshall as Dufresne
- Bert Lahr as Cascart
- Helen Westley as Anais
- Constance Collier as Nathalie
- Genevieve Tobin as Florianne
- Walter Catlett as Marlardot
- Ann E. Todd as Toto
- Rex O'Malley as Bussy
- Ernest Cossart as Marchand
- Rex Evans as Michelin
- Robert Fischer as Pierre
- Janet Waldo as Simone
- Dorothy Tree as Madame Dufresne
- Duncan Renaldo as Animal trainer
