= 1956 in French television =

This is a list of French television related events from 1956.

== Events ==
- 24 May – France enters the first-ever Eurovision Song Contest with "Le temps perdu", performed by Mathé Altéry and "Il est là", performed by Dany Dauberson.

== Debuts ==
- 11 January – La Piste aux étoiles (1956–1978)

== Television shows ==
=== 1940s ===
- Le Jour du Seigneur (1949–present)

=== 1950s ===
- Art et magie de la cuisine
- Le Club du jeudi (1950–1961)
- Magazine féminin (1952–1970)
- Lectures pour tous (1953–1968)
- La Boîte à sel (1955–1960)
- Présence protestante (1957–)

== Ending this year ==
- Face à l'opinion

== See also ==
- 1956 in France
- List of French films of 1956
