= La Dame de chez Maxim =

La Dame de chez Maxim or La Dama de chez Maxim may refer to:

- La Dame de chez Maxim (play), an 1899 play by Georges Feydeau
- La Dame de chez Maxim's (1912 film), a 1912 silent French film, adapted from the play
- La dama de Chez Maxim's (1923 film), a 1923 silent Italian film, adapted from the play
- La dame de chez Maxim's (1933 film), a British French-language film, adapted from the play
- La Dame de chez Maxim (1950 film), a 1950 French film, adapted from the play

== See also ==
- The Girl from Maxim's (disambiguation), multiple works
