= 1955 in French television =

This is a list of French television related events from 1955.

== Debuts ==
- 2 October – Présence protestante
- 16 October – La Boîte à sel (1955–1960)

== Television shows ==
=== 1940s ===
- Le Jour du Seigneur (1949–present)

=== 1950s ===
- Magazine féminin (1952–1970)
- Lectures pour tous (1953–1968)
- Face à l'opinion (1954-1956)
- Art et magie de la cuisine (1954-1967)

== Births ==
- 19 July – Karen Cheryl, singer, actress, television and radio presenter

== See also ==
- 1955 in France
- List of French films of 1955
