= The Girl from Maxim's =

The Girl from Maxim's may refer to:

- The Girl from Maxim's (play), 1899 farce by Georges Feydeau
- The Girl from Maxim's (1933 film), 1933 British film based on the play and directed by Alexander Korda
- The Girl from Maxim's (1950 film), 1950 French film based on the play and directed by Marcel Aboulke

== See also ==
- La Dame de chez Maxim, multiple works
