= Zaza (1915 film) =

1915 film by Edwin Stanton Porter

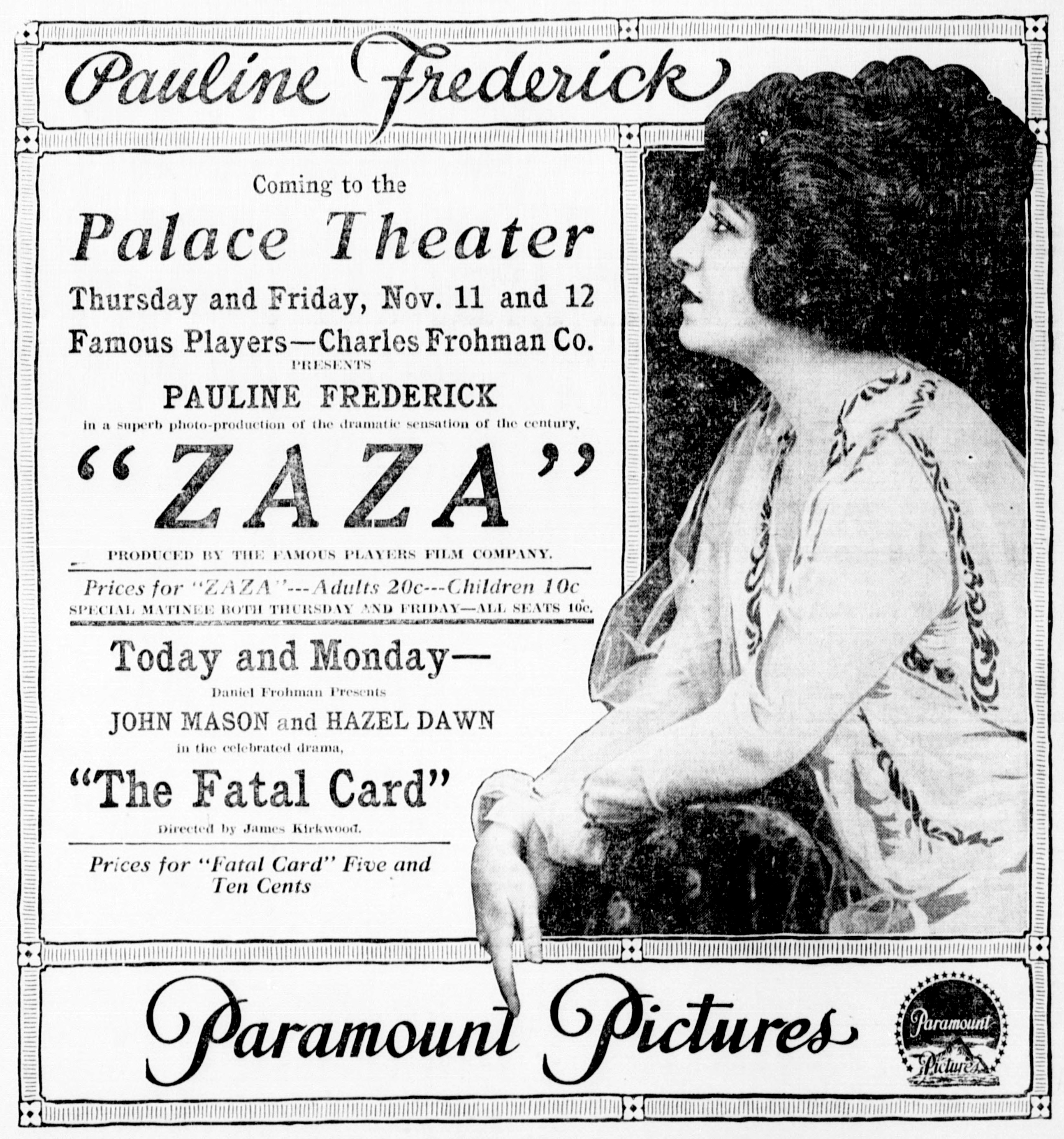
- Contemporary newspaper advertisement.
- Directed by: Edwin S. Porter; Hugh Ford
- Written by: David Belasco (play)
- Based on: Zaza by Pierre Berton and Charles Simon
- Produced by: Adolph Zukor; Charles Frohman
- Starring: Pauline Frederick
- Distributed by: Paramount Pictures
- Release date: November 11, 1915
- Running time: 50 minutes
- Country: United States
- Languages: Silent; English intertitles

Zaza is a 1915 American silent romantic drama film produced by Famous Players Film Company in association with the Charles Frohman Company, and distributed by Paramount Pictures. The film was directed by Edwin S. Porter and Hugh Ford and stars Pauline Frederick in the title role. The film is based on the 1899 French stage play of the same name that starred Mrs. Leslie Carter, and the American adaptation by David Belasco.

Zaza's original release date was scheduled for October 4, 1915. A nitrate fire at the Famous Players studio on September 11, 1915, caused the film's release to be delayed until November 11.

== Plot ==
Zaza, a popular Parisian music hall performer, falls in love with Bernard Dufrene, unaware that he is married and has a daughter. Enraged by his deception, she plans to expose their affair to his wife but changes her mind after meeting the child. Ending the relationship, Zaza returns to the stage and achieves great success. When Bernard later attempts to rekindle their romance, she resists her lingering feelings and sends him back to his family, devoting herself to her career.

== Cast ==
- Pauline Frederick as Zaza
- Julian L'Estrange as Bernard Dufrene
- Ruth Sinclair as Madame Dufrene
- Maude Granger as Aunt Rosa
- Blanche Fisher as Louise
- Helen Sinnott as Nathalie
- Mark Smith as Cascart
- Charles Butler as Duc de Brissac
- Walter Craven as Dubois
- Madge Evans as Child (uncredited)

== Other adaptations ==
The play was adapted for the screen again in 1923 starring Gloria Swanson, and in 1939, starring Claudette Colbert.

== Preservation ==
Zaza is currently presumed lost. In February of 2021, the film was cited by the National Film Preservation Board on their Lost U.S. Silent Feature Films list.

== See also ==
- Edwin S. Porter filmography
- List of lost films
