= Zaza (play) =

Play written by Pierre Berton

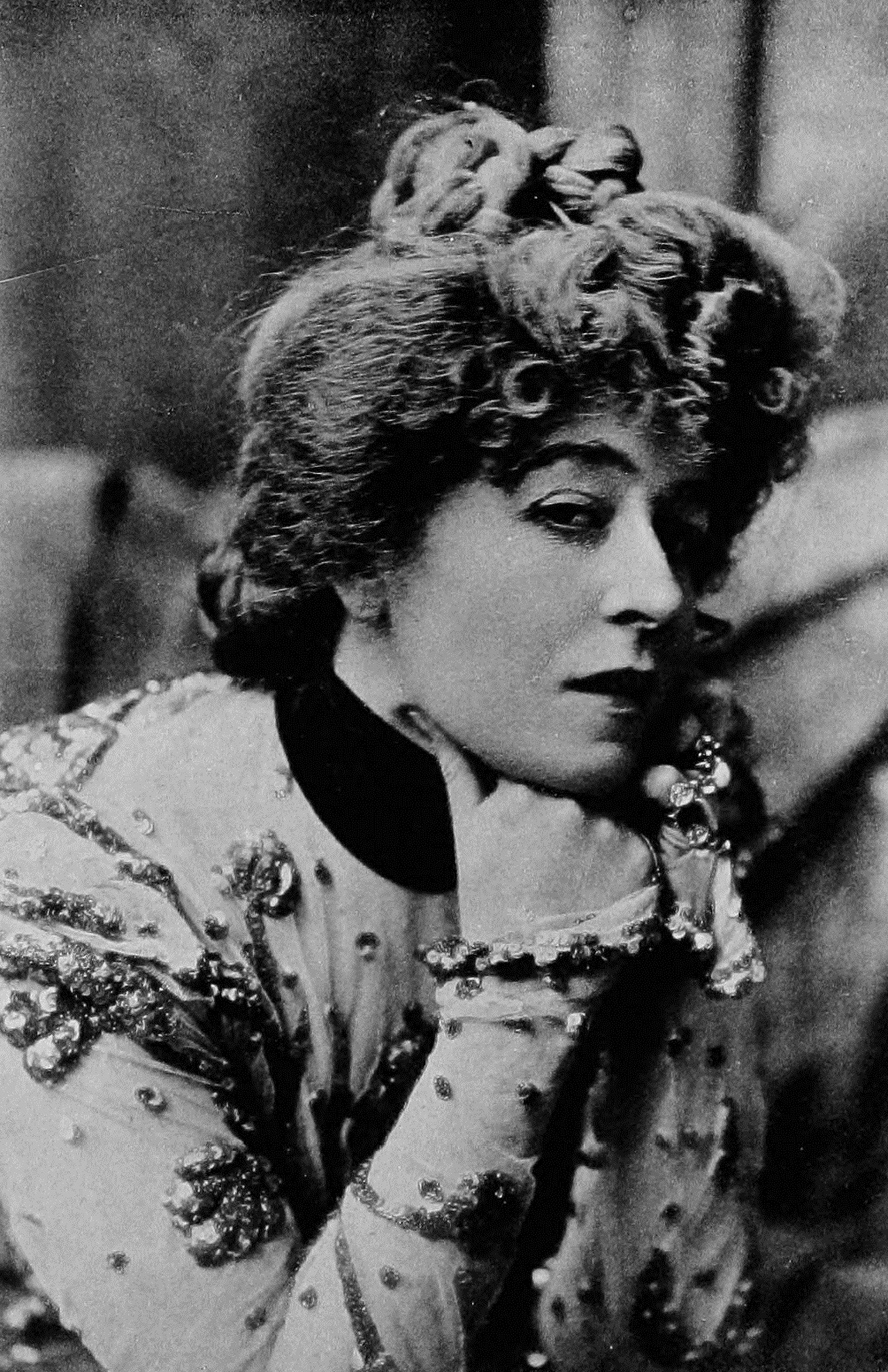
Mrs. Leslie Carter in the Broadway production of Zaza

Zaza is a French-language play written by playwrights Pierre Berton and Charles Simon, and staged for the first time at the Théâtre du Vaudeville in Paris, in May 1898. The title character is a prostitute who becomes a music hall entertainer and the mistress of a married man.

The play is probably best known in the English-speaking world in the adaptation of the same title by David Belasco, which premiered at the Lafayette Square Opera House in Washington, D.C., in December 1898, and subsequently opened at the Garrick Theatre in New York City, in January 1899. It is also the source material for the 1900 opera Zazà by Ruggero Leoncavallo.

A substantial difference between the two stagings is that in the original French play, Zaza and her married customer resume their relationship after she becomes a successful performer, whereas in the American adaptation, they do not reunite.

== Films ==
- Zaza (France, 1913, dir. Adrien Caillard, with Maria Ventura
- Zaza (1915, dir. Edwin S. Porter and Hugh Ford), with Pauline Frederick
- Zaza (1923, dir. Allan Dwan), with Gloria Swanson
- Zaza (1938, dir. George Cukor), with Claudette Colbert
- Zaza (Italy, 1944, dir. Renato Castellani), with Isa Miranda
- Zaza (France, 1956, dir. René Gaveau), with Lilo de la Passardière
