= The Red Head (1952 film) =

1952 film

- Directed by: Paul Mesnier
- Written by: Jules Renard (novel); Paul Mesnier; Albert Vidalie
- Produced by: André Aubert; Jean-Paul Paulin
- Starring: Raymond Souplex; Germaine Dermoz; Pierre Larquey
- Cinematography: Charles Bauer
- Edited by: Germaine Artus
- Music by: Marceau Van Hoorebecke
- Production companies: Francinalp; Merry Films
- Distributed by: Astoria Films
- Release date: 28 May 1952
- Running time: 100 minutes
- Country: France
- Language: French

The Red Head (French: Poil de Carotte) is a 1952 French drama film directed by Paul Mesnier and starring Raymond Souplex, Germaine Dermoz and Pierre Larquey. It is based on the novel Poil de Carotte by Jules Renard which had previously adapted into films twice by Julien Duvivier before the Second World War.

== Cast ==
- Raymond Souplex as M. Lepic
- Germaine Dermoz as Mme Lepic
- Pierre Larquey as Le parrain
- Odette Barencey as Honorine
- Maurice Biraud
- Jean-Jacques Duverger as Marceau
- Guy Haurey as Félix
- René Hell as L'adjoint
- Corinne Jean-Jacques as Ernestine
- Robert Le Fort as Paul
- Lucienne Le Marchand as Agathe
- Jean-Pierre Lituac as Le surveillant
- Laure Paillette
- Germaine Reuver as Mme Serain
- Christian Simon as Poil de Carotte
- Marcel Vallée as Le directeur
