= André Oumansky =

French actor (1933–2025)

- Born: 15 August 1933
- Died: 26 September 2025 (aged 92)
- Occupation: Actor

André Oumansky (15 August 1933 – 26 September 2025) was a French actor. He appeared in more than 80 films from 1958. Oumansky died on 26 September 2025, at the age of 92.

== Filmography ==
Year	Title	Role	Notes
1958	Le Miroir à deux faces	Danseur anniversaire de Véronique	
1960	The Truth	Ludovic	
1960	Austerlitz		
1962	Sundays and Cybele	Bernard	
1964	Joy House		
1965	The Hour of Truth	Daniel	
1970	The Lady in the Car with Glasses and a Gun	Bernard Thorr	
1971	Raphael, or The Debauched One		
1972	Figaro-ci, Figaro-là		
1974	The Marseille Contract		
1984	Just the Way You Are		
1993	Tout le monde n'a pas eu la chance d'avoir des parents communistes	Cousin Isaac	
1994	Burnt by the Sun	Philippe	
1994	Highlander: The Final Dimension	Marquis de Condorcet	
1995	Othello	Gratiano	
1996	Beaumarchais		
1999	History Is Made at Night		
2006	Marie Antoinette	Cardinal de La Roche Aymon	
2006	Babel	Walter	
2008	Largo Winch	Jacques Wallenberg	
2009	Lucky Luke	President Winston H. Jameson	

TV
Year	Title	Role	Notes
1993	Charlemagne, le prince à cheval		
2004	Dunkirk		
2008	God on Trial		
