= An Artist with Ladies =

- Directed by: Jean Boyer
- Written by: Serge Véber; Jean Boyer
- Produced by: Jean Boyer; Ray Ventura
- Starring: Fernandel; Renée Devillers; Arlette Poirier
- Cinematography: Charles Suin
- Edited by: Fanchette Mazin
- Music by: Paul Misraki
- Production company: Hoche Productions
- Distributed by: Cocinor
- Release date: 9 May 1952
- Running time: 87 minutes
- Country: France
- Language: French

An Artist with Ladies (French: Coiffeur pour dames) is a 1952 French comedy film directed by Jean Boyer and starring Fernandel, Renée Devillers and Arlette Poirier. It was shot at the Saint-Maurice Studios in Paris. The film's sets were designed by the art director Robert Giordani.

== Synopsis ==
A former sheep shearer becomes the most celebrated hairdresser in France. His gift has a positive effect on the lives of a number of different woman.

== Cast ==
- Fernandel as Marius, dit Mario
- Renée Devillers as Mme Brochand
- Arlette Poirier as Edmonde
- Georges Chamarat as Le docteur
- Françoise Soulié as Denise Brochand
- Jacques Eyser as Vatherin
- Mireille Ponsard as Une cliente
- Claudette Donald
- Nadine Tallier as Mlle Mado
- Nicole Jonesco as Colette - la soubrette
- Yana Gani as L'impératrice
- Julien Maffre as Le paysan à la jument
- José Noguéro as Gonzalès Cordeba y Navarro y Vavor
- Manuel Gary as Gaëtan
- Georges Lannes as Brochand
- Jane Sourza as Mme Gilibert
- Blanchette Brunoy as Aline
- Marcel Meral
- Germaine Kerjean as Madame Vatherin
- Charles Bouillaud as L'Inspecteur
- Geo Forster as Un invité
- Micheline Gary as Une invitée
- Nicole Lemaire as Louise
- Nicole Regnault as Une cliente 'Saint-Germain-des-Prés'
- Hélène Tossy as La boulangère

== Bibliography ==
- James Monaco. The Encyclopedia of Film. Perigee Books, 1991.
