= Via Padova 46 =

1953 film

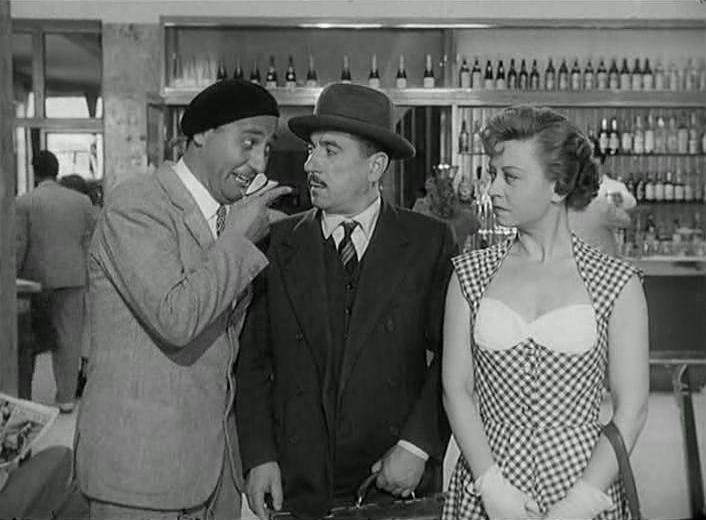
- Directed by: Giorgio Bianchi
- Written by: Aldo De Benedetti; Fede Arnaud; Leopoldo Trieste; Giorgio Bianchi
- Produced by: Roberto Capitani; Carlo Minaldi; Luigi Mondello
- Starring: Peppino De Filippo; Alberto Sordi; Giulietta Masina; Arlette Poirier
- Cinematography: Carlo Montuori
- Edited by: Adriana Novelli
- Music by: Nino Rota
- Production company: Edo Film
- Distributed by: Rank Film Distributors of Italy
- Release date: 18 November 1953
- Running time: 88 minutes
- Country: Italy
- Language: Italian

Via Padova 46 is a 1953 Italian comedy film directed by Giorgio Bianchi and starring Peppino De Filippo, Alberto Sordi, Giulietta Masina and Arlette Poirier.

The film's sets were designed by the art director Saverio D'Eugenio. It earned around 142 million lira at the box office.

== Synopsis ==
In postwar Rome a clerk at the finance ministry leads a dull, monotonous life at work and had home where he lives with his hypochondriac wife and domineering mother-in-law. His life takes on air of excitement, however, when he is invited to a rendezvous at an apartment on the Via Padova with an attractive foreign woman. On arriving there he finds her murdered and now fears that the police are close on his trail.

== Songs ==
In the scene where Arduino Buongiorno goes alone on Sunday afternoon to the Italia bar in Piazza della Repubblica in Rome to get some vanilla cake, the song Maria Magdalena sung by Flo Sandon's with the orchestra conducted by Federico is heard to the rhythm of samba Bergamini.

== Cast ==
- Peppino De Filippo as Arduino Buongiorno
- Alberto Sordi as Gianrico
- Giulietta Masina as Irene
- Arlette Poirier as Marcella Dupont
- Leopoldo Trieste as The Man with a Cigarette
- Ada Dondini as Arduino's Mother-in-Law
- Lidia Martora as Carmela
- Luigi Pavese as The Office Manager
- Ernesto Almirante as Cesare
- Memmo Carotenuto as Bertuccelli
- Lamberto Maggiorani as The Porter in Via Padova
- Carlo Dapporto as Avvocato Tancredo Tancredi
- Vittorio Duse as Policeman at the Airport
- Franco Giacobini as The Journalist

== Bibliography ==
- Chiti, Roberto & Poppi, Roberto. Dizionario del cinema italiano: Dal 1945 al 1959. Gremese Editore, 1991.
