= Adele's Gift =

1951 film

- Directed by: Émile Couzinet
- Written by: Émile Couzinet
- Based on: Adele's Gift by Pierre Barillet and Jean-Pierre Grédy
- Produced by: Émile Couzinet
- Starring: Marguerite Pierry; Lilo; Charles Dechamps
- Cinematography: Pierre Dolley
- Edited by: Henriette Wurtzer
- Music by: Vincent Scotto
- Production company: Burgus Films
- Distributed by: Societe d'Edition et de Location de Films
- Release date: 2 February 1951
- Running time: 93 minutes
- Country: France
- Language: French

Adele's Gift (French: Le don d'Adèle) is a 1951 French comedy film directed by Émile Couzinet and starring Marguerite Pierry, Lilo and Charles Dechamps. It is based on a play of the same title by Pierre Barillet and Jean-Pierre Grédy. The film's sets were designed by the art director René Renneteau.

== Cast ==
- Marguerite Pierry as Edmée Veyron-Laffite
- Lilo as Adèle
- Charles Dechamps as Gaston Veyron-Laffite
- Hélène Bellanger as Solange Veyron-Laffite
- Robert Lamoureux as Robert Lamoureux
- Jacques Bénétin as Antoine Veyron-laffite
- Marcel Vallée as Gachassin
- Jane Sourza as Madame Gachassin
- Le Ballet Mady Pierozzi as Les danseuses du cabaret

== Bibliography ==
- Goble, Alan. The Complete Index to Literary Sources in Film. Walter de Gruyter, 1999.
- Rège, Philippe. Encyclopedia of French Film Directors, Volume 1. Scarecrow Press, 2009.
