= Roger Dormoy =

French cinematographer

- Born: 16 August 1914; Ismailia, Egypt
- Died: 7 May 1984 (aged 69); Paris, France
- Occupation: Cinematographer
- Years active: 1940-1981 (film & TV)

Roger Dormoy (1914–1984) was an Egyptian-born French cinematographer.

== Selected filmography ==
- Colonel Durand (1948)
- Fandango (1949)
- Thus Finishes the Night (1949)
- I Like Only You (1949)
- Mademoiselle Josette, My Woman (1950)
- Jocelyn (1952)
- My Brother from Senegal (1953)
- The Secret of Helene Marimon (1954)
- Short Head (1956)
- It's All Adam's Fault (1958)
- The Gigolo (1960)
- Jacquou le Croquant (1969, TV series)

== Bibliography ==
- Waldman, Harry. Maurice Tourneur: The Life and Films. McFarland, 2001.
