= Wells in Flames =

1937 film directed by Viktor Tourjansky

- Directed by: Viktor Tourjansky
- Written by: Jean-Pierre Feydeau; Peter Francke; Gerhard Menzel; Walter Supper
- Starring: Josseline Gaël; George Rigaud; Suzy Vernon
- Cinematography: Karl Puth
- Edited by: Viktor Tourjansky
- Music by: Walter Gronostay
- Production company: UFA
- Distributed by: ACE
- Release date: 2 April 1937
- Running time: 85 minutes
- Country: Germany
- Language: French

Wells in Flames (French: Puits en flammes) is a 1937 German adventure film directed by Viktor Tourjansky and starring Josseline Gaël, George Rigaud and Suzy Vernon. It is the French-language version of City of Anatol (1936). The film's sets were designed by the art director Otto Hunte.

== Cast ==
- Josseline Gaël as Mirka
- George Rigaud as Jacques Grégor
- Suzy Vernon as Sonja
- Raymond Aimos as Yanko
- Jacques Dumesnil as Garcia
- Jeanne Lion as Mme Yvolandi
- Pierre Labry as Le marchand de melons
- Georges Prieur as Le baron Stirbey
- Gaston Mauger
- Gil Colas as Lebermann
- Jeanne Pérez as Marina
- Yvonne Yma
- André Siméon
- Léonce Corne
- Roger Legris
- Yvonne Yvonne
- Alexandre Rignault as Le contremaître
- Gabriel Gabrio as Korsoum
- Léon Courtois
- Nicole de Rouves
- Max Maxudian as Samosh
- Charles Redgie

== Bibliography ==
- Rentschler, Eric. The Ministry of Illusion: Nazi Cinema and Its Afterlife. Harvard University Press, 1996.
