= Andalusia (film) =

1951 film

- Directed by: Robert Vernay
- Written by: Jean-Pierre Feydeau; Luis Lucia; Robert Vernay
- Based on: Libretto by Albert Willemetz and Raymond Vincy
- Produced by: Mario Bruitte; Albert Dodrumez; François Harispuru; Édouard Harispuru
- Starring: Luis Mariano; Carmen Sevilla; Arlette Poirier
- Cinematography: André Thomas
- Edited by: Marthe Poncin
- Music by: Francis Lopez
- Production companies: Compagnie Commerciale Française Cinématographique; Union des Distributeurs Indépendants; C.E.A.
- Distributed by: Columbia Films
- Release date: 7 March 1951
- Running time: 94 minutes
- Countries: France; Spain
- Language: French

Andalusia (French: Andalousie) is a 1951 French-Spanish musical film directed by Robert Vernay and starring Luis Mariano, Carmen Sevilla and Arlette Poirier. Part of the tradition of operetta films, it is based on an operetta composed by Francis Lopez. It was shot at the Billancourt Studios in Paris and on location around Seville and filmed in Gevacolor. The film's sets were designed by the art director Guy de Gastyne. A separate Spanish-language version The Dream of Andalusia was also produced, directed by Luis Lucia.

== Synopsis ==
Juanito has an argument with his girlified Dolorès and leaves for Mexico where he finds fame as a matador. Dolorès becomes celebrated herself as a dancer under the stage name of Estrellita, and sends many love letters to him. However these are intercepted by another woman who is in love with him and does everything she can to keep them apart, but the two meet again in Seville and despite a series of misunderstandings true love eventually triumphs.

== Cast ==
- Luis Mariano as Juanito Var
- Carmen Sevilla as Dolorès / Estrellita
- Arlette Poirier as Fanny Miller
- Perrette Souplex as Pilar
- Liliane Bert as Greta
- Andrée Moreau as Doña Augustias
- José Nieto as Vicente
- Enrique Guitart as Rodriguez Valiente
- Léon Berton as Le secrétaire
- Jean Berton as Le commissaire
- Alexandre Rignault as Pancho
- Robert Arnoux as Schnell
- Noël Roquevert as Ricardo Garcia
- Maurice Baquet as Pepe
- Paul Demange as Le régisseur
- Daniel Mendaille as Le médecin
- Yvonne Yma as L'habilleuse

== Bibliography ==
- Rège, Philippe. Encyclopedia of French Film Directors, Volume 1. Scarecrow Press, 2009.
