= Zaza (1956 film) =

1956 film

- Directed by: René Gaveau
- Written by: Pierre Laroche
- Based on: Zaza by Pierre Berton and Charles Simon
- Produced by: René Gaveau
- Starring: Lilo; Maurice Teynac; Robert Dalban
- Cinematography: Pierre Dolley
- Edited by: Jeannette Berton; Claude Gros
- Music by: Francis Lopez
- Production companies: Union Européenne Cinématographique; Général Productions; Société Nouvelle de Cinématographie
- Distributed by: Universal Pictures
- Release date: 3 October 1956
- Running time: 82 minutes
- Country: France
- Language: French

Zaza is a 1956 French drama film directed by René Gaveau and starring Lilo, Maurice Teynac and Robert Dalban. It is an adaptation of the 1898 play Zaza by Pierre Berton and Charles Simon. The film's sets were designed by the art director Aimé Bazin. It was distributed by the French subsidiary of Universal Pictures.

== Cast ==
- Lilo as Zaza
- Maurice Teynac as Bernard Dufresnes
- Robert Dalban as Cascard
- Albert Dinan as Malardot
- Pauline Carton as Mme. Anaïs
- Mag-Avril as Nathalie
- Luce Aubertin as Floriane
- Jim Gérald as Edouard Dubuisson
- André Toscano as Bussy
- Dominique Page as La bonne de Mme. Dufresne
- Claude Godard as Orianne
- Sophie Leclair as Miette
- Mick Micheyl as Toto

== Bibliography ==
- Goble, Alan. The Complete Index to Literary Sources in Film. Walter de Gruyter, 1999.
- Rège, Philippe. Encyclopedia of French Film Directors, Volume 1. Scarecrow Press, 2009.
