= Extenuating Circumstances (film) =

1939 film

- Directed by: Jean Boyer
- Written by: Marcel Arnac (novel); Jean Boyer; Jean-Pierre Feydeau; Yves Mirande
- Produced by: Jean Martinetti
- Starring: Michel Simon; Suzanne Dantès; Arletty
- Cinematography: Victor Arménise
- Edited by: Maurice Serein
- Music by: Georges Van Parys
- Production company: Société Française de Production
- Distributed by: Compagnie Commerciale Française Cinématographique
- Release date: 26 July 1939
- Running time: 85 minutes
- Country: France
- Language: French

Extenuating Circumstances (French: Circonstances atténuantes) is a 1939 French comedy film directed by Jean Boyer and starring Michel Simon, Suzanne Dantès and Arletty. It was shot at the Joinville Studios in Paris. The film's sets were designed by the art director Jacques Colombier.

== Synopsis ==
A retired judge known for his harsh views on law and order, leaves for a seaside holiday with his wife. However just outside Paris their car breaks down and they are forced to spend the night in a hotel which is a notorious haunt for criminals.

== Cast ==
- Michel Simon as M. Gaetan Le Sentencier, 'La Sentence'
- Suzanne Dantès as Mme Nathalie Le Sentencier
- Dorville as Jules Le Bouic
- Arletty as Marie Qu'a-d'ça
- François Simon as La poupée
- Andrex as Môme de Dieu
- Robert Arnoux as Gabriel, the chauffeur
- Jeanine Roger as Gabriel's Girlfriend
- Robert Ozanne as Cinq de Canne
- Georges Lannes as Coup de Châsse
- Liliane Lesaffre as Lontine Le Bouic
- Mila Parély as La Panthère
- Émile Saint-Ober as Coco

== Bibliography ==
- Dayna Oscherwitz & MaryEllen Higgins. The A to Z of French Cinema. Scarecrow Press, 2009.
