= Francis Lopez (composer) =

French composer

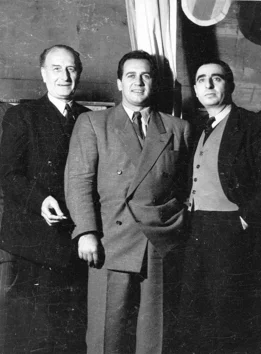
- Francis Lopez (center) between Albert Willemetz and Raymond Vincy
- Born: 15 June 1916; Montbéliard, Doubs, France
- Died: 4 January 1995 (aged 78); Paris, France
- Occupation: Composer
- Years active: 1943-1981 (film)

Francis Lopez (1916–1995) was a French composer of film scores. He also wrote a number of operettas, many of which starred Luis Mariano. He was married several times including to the actress Sylvia Lopez.

== Selected filmography ==
- The Black Cavalier (1945)
- Alone in the Night (1945)
- The Three Cousins (1947)
- Fandango (1949)
- Marlene (1949)
- Eve and the Serpent (1949)
- The Widow and the Innocent (1949)
- I Like Only You (1949)
- The Red Angel (1949)
- I'm in the Revue (1950)
- Andalusia (1951)
- The Dream of Andalusia (1951)
- Rendezvous in Grenada (1951)
- Monsieur Leguignon, Signalman (1952)
- My Priest Among the Rich (1952)
- Imperial Violets (1952)
- The Blonde Gypsy (1953)
- Their Last Night (1953)
- The Cheerful Caravan (1953)
- Saluti e baci (1953)
- The Beauty of Cadiz (1953)
- The Lady of the Camellias (1953)
- Adventures of the Barber of Seville (1954)
- Four Days in Paris (1955)
- Fruits of Summer (1955)
- Zaza (1956)
- Love in Jamaica (1957)
- Irresistible Catherine (1957)
- A Night at the Moulin Rouge (1957)
- The Singer from Mexico (1957)
- Serenade of Texas (1958)
- White Cargo (1958)
- The Bureaucrats (1959)
- The Game of Truth (1961)

== Bibliography ==
- Creekmur, Corey & Mokdad, Linda. The International Film Musical. Edinburgh University Press, 2012.
- Powrie, Phil & Cadalanu, Marie . The French Film Musical. Bloomsbury Publishing, 2020.
