= Les affaires publiques =

- Directed by: Robert Bresson
- Written by: Robert Bresson
- Starring: Beby; Andrée Servilanges; Marcel Dalio
- Release date: 1934
- Running time: 23 minutes
- Country: France
- Language: French

Les affaires publiques (also known as Public Affairs) is a 1934 French directorial debut short film by Robert Bresson. It was considered a lost film until 1987, when a print was discovered in the Cinémathèque française.

== Plot ==
A comedic short film about two fictional rival republics.
