= The Beauty of Cadiz =

1953 film by Raymond Bernard

- Directed by: Raymond Bernard; Eusebio Fernández Ardavín
- Written by: Francis Lopez (operetta); Maurice Vandair (operetta); Raymond Vincy (libretto); Marc Cab (libretto); Jesús María de Arozamena; Raymond Bernard; Jean-Pierre Feydeau; Pierre Laroche
- Produced by: Édouard Harispuru
- Starring: Luis Mariano; Carmen Sevilla; Jean Tissier
- Cinematography: Philippe Agostini
- Edited by: Raymond Leboursier; Margarita de Ochoa; Bienvenida Sanz
- Music by: Francis Lopez
- Production companies: CCFC; CEA
- Distributed by: CCFC; CEA
- Release date: 29 November 1953
- Running time: 105 minutes
- Countries: France; Spain
- Languages: French; Spanish
- Box office: $32.5 million

The Beauty of Cadiz (French: La belle de Cadix, Spanish: La bella de Cádiz) is a 1953 French-Spanish musical comedy film directed by Raymond Bernard and Eusebio Fernández Ardavín and starring Luis Mariano, Carmen Sevilla and Jean Tissier. It is an operetta film, based on the 1945 operetta of the same title. It was shot at the Boulogne Studios in Paris. The film's sets were designed by the art director Léon Barsacq.

== Plot ==
A French cinema company is shooting a picture requiring real gypsies, so they hire a whole bunch and choose beautiful María Luisa to team with famed singer Carlos Molina. The plot includes a marriage and María Luisa believes it has been a real one.

== Cast ==
- Luis Mariano as Carlos
- Carmen Sevilla as Maria-Luisa
- Jean Tissier as Auguste Legrand
- Claude Nicot as Robert
- Claire Maurier as Alexandrine Dupont
- Thérèse Dorny as Blanche
- J.A. Pierjac as Manillon
- Léonce Corne as Le photographe
- José Torres as Raphael
- André Wasley
- Pierre Flourens
- Yvonne Claudie
- Conchita Bautista
- Fernando Sancho
- Rafael Arcos
- Rosario Royo
- Christine Bailli
- Chantal Retz
- Joëlle Robin
- Michèle Nancey
- Janine Zorelli
