= Love in Jamaica =

1957 film

- Directed by: André Berthomieu
- Written by: André Berthomieu; Raymond Vincy (libretto)
- Produced by: Francis Lopez; Eugène Lépicier
- Starring: Luis Mariano; Jane Sourza; Paquita Rico
- Cinematography: Marcel Grignon; Raymond Lemoigne
- Edited by: Gilbert Natot; Marie-Josèphe Yoyotte
- Music by: Francis Lopez (operetta)
- Production companies: Lyrica; Films Mars; Filmel
- Distributed by: La Société des Films Sirius
- Release date: 5 April 1957
- Running time: 96 minutes
- Country: France
- Language: French

Love in Jamaica (French: À la Jamaïque) is a 1957 French musical comedy film directed by André Berthomieu and starring Luis Mariano, Jane Sourza and Paquita Rico. It is an operetta film, adapted from a stage work composed by Francis Lopez. It was shot at the Franstudios in Paris. The film's sets were designed by the art director Raymond Nègre.

== Cast ==
- Luis Mariano as Manoël Martinez
- Jane Sourza as Annie Krüschen
- Paquita Rico as Olivia de Montana
- Gisèle Robert as Gilda
- Fernand Sardou as Maxime de Sainte-Maxime
- Darry Cowl as Pater noster
- Frédéric Duvallès as Simon Legrand
- Gaston Orbal as Le capitaine
- Georges Aminel as Pépito
- Bernard Dumaine
- Christian Duvaleix
- Maurice Nasil
- Madeleine Suffel
- Maurice Teynac
- Louis Villor
- Nono Zammit

== Bibliography ==
- Philippe Rège. Encyclopedia of French Film Directors, Volume 1. Scarecrow Press, 2009.
