= Andrée Servilanges =

French actress (1911–2001)

- Born: 23 April 1911; Paris, France
- Died: 2 December 2001 (aged 90); Vic-sur-Aisne, Aisne, France
- Occupation: Actress
- Years active: 1934-1970 (film)

Andrée Servilanges (1911–2001) was a French stage and film actress. She was married to the film director Paul Mesnier. In 1934 she starred in Robert Bresson's directorial debut, the short film Public Affairs.

== Selected filmography ==
- Les affaires publiques (1934)
- The Woman from the End of the World (1938)
- The Scarlet Bazaar (1947)
- The Porter from Maxim's (1953)
- Tourments (1954)
- Chéri-Bibi (1955)
- Babes a GoGo (1956)

== Bibliography ==
- Pipolo, Tony. Robert Bresson: A Passion for Film. Oxford University Press, 2010.
