= Perrette Souplex =

French film and television actress (1930–2024)

- Born: 22 April 1930; Paris, France
- Died: 19 May 2024 (aged 94)
- Other name: Perrette Guillermain
- Occupation: Actress
- Years active: 1948–2024

Perrette Souplex (22 April 1930 – 19 May 2024) was a French film and television actress. Souplex died on 19 May 2024, at the age of 94.

== Selected filmography ==
- Paris Still Sings (1951)
- Andalusia (1951)
- The Dream of Andalusia (1951)
- Suspicion (1956)
- La smala (1984)

== Bibliography ==
- Maurice Bessy, André Bernard & Raymond Chirat. Histoire du cinéma français: 1951-1955. Pygmalion, 1989.
