= The Scarlet Bazaar =

- Directed by: Paul Mesnier
- Written by: Paul Mesnier; Francis Vincent-Bréchignac
- Produced by: André Mallet; Jacques Panhaleux; Guillaume Radot; Hubert Vincent-Bréchignac
- Starring: Albert Préjean; Andrée Servilanges; Jean Tissier
- Cinematography: Georges Million
- Edited by: Émilienne Nelissen
- Music by: Maurice Thiriet
- Production company: Union Technique Cinematographique
- Distributed by: Les Films Ti Breiz
- Release date: 23 April 1947
- Running time: 85 minutes
- Country: France
- Language: French

The Scarlet Bazaar (French: La kermesse rouge) is a 1947 French historical drama film directed by Paul Mesnier and starring Albert Préjean, Andrée Servilanges and Jean Tissier. It was shot at the Buttes-Chaumont Studios in Paris. The film's sets were designed by the art director Marcel Magniez.

== Synopsis ==
The film portrays the fictional rivalry between two painters, a man and wife, that concludes with an incident based on a real-life 1897 fire in Paris.

== Main cast ==
- Albert Préjean as Claude Sironi
- Andrée Servilanges as Agnès Bonnardet-Sironi
- Jean Tissier as René de Montbriant
- Germaine Kerjean as Mme Bonnardet
- Lucas Gridoux as L'antiquaire
- Émile Drain as Le révérend dominicain
- Léon Arvel as M. Bonnardet
- Hélène Tossy as Tante Élisabeth
- Marthe Mellot as Rose de St-Aubin
- Nina Myral as Éléonore de St-Aubin
- Marcelle Rexiane as La gouvernante
- Colette Régis as La duchesse d'Alençon

== Bibliography ==
- Burnett, Colin. The Invention of Robert Bresson: The Auteur and His Market. Indiana University Press, 2016.
