= Arlette Poirier =

French actress (1926–2012)

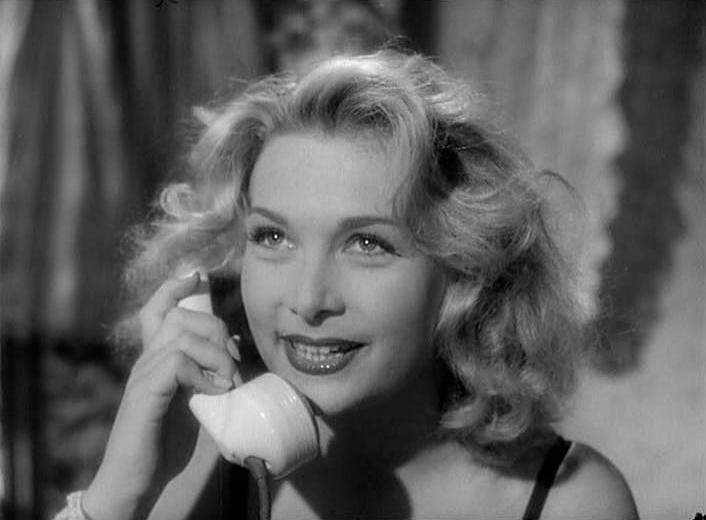
- Poirier in Lo scocciatore (Via Padova 46) (1953)
- Born: 11 June 1926; Paris, France
- Died: 30 May 2012 (aged 85); Nîmes, France
- Occupation: Actress
- Years active: 1950–1973

Arlette Poirier (11 June 1926 – 30 May 2012) was a French actress.

== Filmography ==
Year	Title	Role	Notes
1950	The Girl from Maxim's	La môme Crevette	
1951	The Dream of Andalusia	Fanny Miller	
1951	Andalusia	Fanny Miller	
1951	Les deux Monsieur de Madame	Marthe Gatouillat	
1952	My Wife, My Cow and Me		
1952	An Artist with Ladies	Edmonde	
1952	Run Away Mr. Perle	Maud	
1953	My Childish Father	Philippine Opossum	
1953	Via Padova 46	Marcella Dupont	
1953	Scampolo 53		
1954	It's the Paris Life	Emilienne de Montluçon	
1958	The Lovers of Montparnasse	Lulu	
1958	Serenade of Texas	Dolorès	
1960	Amour, autocar et boîtes de nuit	Annette	
1972	I Am Frigid... Why?	Madame Chambon	(final film role)

== Bibliography ==
- Hayward, Susan. French Costume Drama of the 1950s: Fashioning Politics in Film. Intellect Books, 2010.
