= Man and Child =

1956 film

- Directed by: Raoul André
- Written by: Orin Jannings (adaptation & dialogue); Raymond Caillava (adaptation & dialogue)
- Screenplay by: Jacques Constant
- Produced by: Simone Berriau; J.M. Brandel; Ray Ventura
- Starring: Eddie Constantine; Juliette Gréco
- Cinematography: Nicolas Hayer
- Edited by: Gabriel Rongier
- Music by: Jeff Davis
- Color process: Eastmancolor
- Production companies: Hoche Productions; Eden Productions; Carol Film
- Distributed by: Les Films Corona
- Release date: 28 November 1956
- Running time: 90 minutes
- Countries: France; Italy
- Language: French

Man and Child (French: L'Homme et I'Enfant) is a 1956 French-Italian CinemaScope crime film directed by Raoul André and starring Eddie Constantine and Juliette Gréco.

== Plot ==
On the Côte d’Azur, in the “50s”, teenage girls disappear. Eddie Constantine conducts the investigation and dismantles a large drug trafficking and white slavery.

== Cast ==
- Eddie Constantine as Fred Barker
- Juliette Gréco as Nicky Nistakos
- Folco Lulli as Carlo Ferrelli
- Jacqueline Ventura as Elvire
- Michèle Philippe as Donna
- Pascale Roberts as Rita
- Béatrice Altariba as Hélène Mercier
- Nadine Tallier as Pitel
- Tanya Constantine as Cathy
- René Havard as Un complice de Zajir
- Lisette Lebon as Himself (as Lisette Le Bon)
- Jean Lefebvre as Albert
- Jacqueline Marbaux as Himself
- Jean d'Yd as Félix Mercier
- Mario David as Alec
- Margaret Rung as Himself
- Diana Bel as Marie
- Claude Emy as Himself (as Claudette Emy)
- Henri Cogan as Himself as Henry Cogan)
- Jacques Fortin as Himself
- Le Ballet de Bentyber as Himself
- Georges Lannes as Le commissaire Denis
- Jeff Davis as Le commissaire Richard
- Grégoire Aslan as Zajir

== See also ==
- List of French films of 1956
