= Gaston Orbal =

French actor

- Born: 22 November 1898; Montpellier, Hérault, France
- Died: 31 January 1983 (aged 84); Largentière, Ardèche, France
- Occupation: Actor
- Years active: 1931-1962 (film)

Gaston Orbal (1898–1983) was a French stage and film actor.

== Selected filmography ==
- Dédé (1935)
- Tricoche and Cacolet (1938)
- My Aunt the Dictator (1939)
- Tobias Is an Angel (1940)
- The Suitors Club (1941)
- After the Storm (1943)
- A Woman in the Night (1943)
- A Dog's Life (1943)
- Dorothy Looks for Love (1945)
- Box of Dreams (1945)
- Mystery Trip (1947)
- One Night at the Tabarin (1947)
- Clochemerle (1948)
- City of Hope (1948)
- White as Snow (1948)
- The Heroic Monsieur Boniface (1949)
- I Like Only You (1949)
- King Pandora (1950)
- Casimir (1950)
- The Chocolate Girl (1950)
- Le Dindon (1951)
- The King of Camelots (1951)
- Nightclub (1951)
- La Fugue de Monsieur Perle (1952)
- Pleasures of Paris (1952)
- A Hundred Francs a Second (1953)
- Au diable la vertu (1954)
- Ali Baba and the Forty Thieves (1954)
- House on the Waterfront (1955)
- Four Days in Paris (1955)
- La Bande à papa (1956)
- Fernandel the Dressmaker (1956)
- Sénéchal the Magnificent (1957)
- Love in Jamaica (1957)
- Tartarin of Tarascon (1962)

== Bibliography ==
- Jacques Lorcey. Bourvil. PAC, 1981.
