= Ralph Baum =

French film producer

- Born: 4 October 1908; Wiesbaden, Germany
- Died: 1987 (aged 78–79); Paris, France
- Occupations: Film producer and director
- Years active: 1930–85

Ralph Baum (4 October 1908 – 1987) was a French film producer and production manager particularly associated with Max Ophüls whose career spanned from 1930 to 1985 across more than 50 films. He also directed four films.

== Selected filmography ==
- A Man Has Been Stolen (1934)
- The Mayor's Dilemma (1939)
- Maya (1949)
- La Ronde (1950)
- Paris Nights (1951)
- Pleasures of Paris (1952)
- Marianne of My Youth (1955)
- Liza (1972)
