= Yvonne Yma =

French stage and film actress

- Born: Yvonne Adrienne Petit; 5 March 1887; Paris, France
- Died: 11 February 1959 (aged 71); Paris, France
- Occupation: Actress
- Years active: 1931-1959 (film)

Yvonne Yma (1887–1959) was a French stage and film actress.

== Selected filmography ==
- Take Care of Amelie (1932)
- A Father Without Knowing It (1932)
- Student's Hotel (1932)
- Make-Up (1932)
- The Barber of Seville (1933)
- Moses and Solomon, Perfumers (1935)
- The Scandalous Couple (1935)
- The Brighton Twins (1936)
- Bach the Detective (1936)
- Excursion Train (1936)
- Wells in Flames (1937)
- The Man from Nowhere (1937)
- Return at Dawn (1938)
- Girls in Distress (1939)
- Immediate Call (1939)
- The White Slave (1939)
- Metropolitan (1939)
- Thunder Over Paris (1940)
- Facing Destiny (1940)
- Miquette (1940)
- The Master Valet (1941)
- Sins of Youth (1941)
- Chiffon's Wedding (1942)
- The Queen's Necklace (1946)
- Special Mission (1946)
- The Captain (1946)
- Danger of Death (1947)
- La Marie du port (1950)
- Andalusia (1951)
- The Dream of Andalusia (1951)
- Three Women (1952)
- The Slave (1953)
- The Lottery of Happiness (1953)

== Bibliography ==
- Phillips, Alastair. City of Darkness, City of Light: Émigré Filmmakers in Paris, 1929-1939. Amsterdam University Press, 2004.
