= Saluti e baci =

- Directed by: Maurice Labro; Giorgio Simonelli
- Music by: Pippo Barzizza
- Release date: 1953
- Countries: France; Italy

Saluti e baci is a 1953 Franco-Italian comedy-drama film directed by Maurice Labro and Giorgio Simonelli.

== Synopsis ==
In a village in Italy, a radio presenter, Carlo Mastelli, loses his hearing, and passes the microphone to Marina, the young teacher, who suggests launching an appeal whereby all listeners send postcards from their country to Tonino, a young student in danger. Artists and celebrities, mostly from Italy and France, take part in the appeal, and a number respond, which at the same time boosts the show's ratings, and brings great happiness to Carlo.

== Commentary ==
Saluti e baci or Love and Kisses, is a film which deals with charity appeals a long time before the humanitarian appeals of Band Aid or Chanteurs Sans Frontières of the 1980s. In the film, a group of singers get together en masse to help those less fortunate than themselves, something which would later be seen in the Enfoirés who formed Les Restos du Cœur.

== Details ==
- French title : La Route du bonheur
- Italian title: Saluti e baci
- Director : Maurice Labro, Giorgio Simonelli
- Writer : Agenore Incrocci, Furio Scarpelli
- Script: Jacques Emmanuel, Edoardo Anton
- Music : Pipo Barzizza, Francis Lopez
- Directors of photography: Roger Dormoy, Carlo Montuori
- Cameraman: Jacques Robin
- Sound engineer: Jean Bertrand
- Decorators : Paul-Louis Boutié, Alberto Boccianti
- Costumes : Robert Isnardon, Nino Baragli
- Country of origin: France, Italy
- Studio: Cinecittà (Rome)
- Release date: 1952
- Language : Italian
- Producers: Clément Duhour, Silvio Clementelli
- Production directors: Clément Duhour, Pietro Bigerna
- Production companies: Courts et Longs Métrages (France), Athena Cinematografica (Italy)
- Distributors: Athena Cinematografica, Cocinor
- Format : Black and white — 1.37:1 — Monophonic sound — 35 mm
- Genre : Comedy drama, film musical
- Length: 92 minutes
- Release dates:
  - 14 August 1953 in Italy
  - 4 September 1953 in France

== Starring ==
- Philippe Lemaire : Carlo Mastelli
- Catherine Erard : Marina, l’institutrice
- Clément Duhour : le docteur de Blaize
- Christian Duvaleix : l’huissier Pellegrino
- Arturo Bragaglia : Salvatore, le facteur
- Enzo Biliotti : l’inspecteur général
- Natale Cirino : le maire
- Fara Libassi : la grand-mère de Tonino
- Anna Mancini : la fiancée de Teddy Reno
- Nino Pepe : un fan de Nilla Pizzi
- Jacques Verlier : Mario
- Jean-Pierre Cassel

And in alphabetical order :

- Louis Armstrong : lui-même
- Ballet de l'Opéra national de Paris
- Aimé Barelli : lui-même
- Pipo Barzizza : lui-même
- Sidney Bechet : lui-même
- André Claveau : lui-même
- Lucienne Delyle : elle-même
- Gilda : elle-même
- Juliette Gréco : elle-même
- Georges Guétary : lui-même
- Robert Lamoureux : lui-même
- Gino Latilla : lui-même
- Félix Leclerc : lui-même
- Claude Luter : lui-même
- Luis Mariano : lui-même
- Yves Montand : lui-même
- Roberto Murolo : lui-même
- Nilla Pizzi : elle-même
- Line Renaud : elle-même
- Teddy Reno : lui-même
- Django Reinhardt : lui-même
- Hubert Rostaing : lui-même
- Georges Ulmer : lui-même
