= Raymond Souplex =

French actor and singer

Raymond Souplex (1 June 1901 – 22 November 1972) was a French actor and singer. He was in a long-term relationship with Jane Sourza, although they never married.

== Filmography ==
Year	Title	Role	Notes
1940	Sur le plancher des vaches	Un chansonnier	
1940	Radio Surprises	Himself	
1942	Sirius symphonies	Himself	
1949	Manon	M. Paul	
1949	Branquignol	Le convive de sang-froid	
1950	Lady Paname	Arsène Marval - un chanteur célèbre et cabotin	
1950	Murders	Blaise Annequin	
1951	Darling Caroline	Belhomme / Beltemps	
1951	Mr. Peek-a-Boo	Jean-Paul	
1951	Paris Vice Squad	Le commissaire Basquier	
1951	The Billionaire Tramp	Sosthène	
1951	The Real Culprit	Inspecteur Querneau	
1951	Paris Still Sings	Himself	
1951	Au fil des ondes	Himself	
1952	The Red Head	M. Lepic	
1953	Operation Magali	Commissaire Paoli	
1954	Royal Affairs in Versailles	Le commissaire-priseur	
1954	Sur le banc	La Hurlette	
1955	Nagana	Charlier	
1956	Babes a GoGo	Stéphane Petitbourgeois	
1956	Coup dur chez les mous	Totor	
1956	The Babes in the Secret Service	Bonneval	
1956	Les carottes sont cuites	Raymond Boyer	
1956	Les Aventures de Till L'Espiègle	Grippesous	
1958	La fille de feu	Professor Theodore Heldt	
1959	Les amants de demain	Charles	
1960	Chaque minute compte	Commissaire Muller	
1960	Le mouton	Le gardien-chef	
1961	Alibi pour un meurtre	Le commissaire Muller	
1964	L'assassin viendra ce soir	Commissaire Serval	
1964	Le dernier tiercé	Inspecteur Masurel	
1966	La sentinelle endormie	Villeroy	
1967	The Curse of Belphegor	Inspecteur Legris	
1971	Clodo	Le curé	
