= My Brother from Senegal =

1953 film by Guy Lacourt

- Raymond Bussières and Annette Poivre
- Directed by: Guy Lacourt
- Written by: Norbert Carbonnaux
- Produced by: Albert Mazaleyrat; Georges Sénamaud
- Starring: Raymond Bussières; Annette Poivre; Noël Roquevert
- Cinematography: Roger Dormoy; Marcel Weiss
- Edited by: Marcelle Lioret
- Music by: Norbert Glanzberg
- Production company: Société Lyonnaise de Production de Films
- Distributed by: Sofradis
- Release date: 20 November 1953
- Running time: 85 minutes
- Country: France
- Language: French

My Brother from Senegal (French: Mon frangin du Sénégal) is a 1953 French comedy film directed by Guy Lacourt and starring Raymond Bussières, Annette Poivre and Noël Roquevert.

The film's sets were designed by the art director Paul-Louis Boutié.

== Synopsis ==
A young photographer is in love with the daughter of a nearby grocer. However she is obsessed with the adventurous heroes she watches in films. To impress her he decides to invent an identical twin recently returned from French Africa.

== Cast ==
- Raymond Bussières as Jules Pinson, photograph and son "double": César
- Annette Poivre as Annette Bridoux, the daughter of the grocer
- Noël Roquevert as Mr Bridoux, the grocer and father of Annette
- Paulette Dubost as Séraphine, the maidservant of Mr Chaffinch
- Paul Demange as the ancient colonial
- Marcelle Arnold as Mrs Angèle
- Sophie Sel as Mrs Sophie, the florist
- Jacques Fabbri as the corporal of police station
- Gisèle Grandpré as the lady who makes photograph her binoculars
- Irène Bréor as the singer in the ball
- Albert Michel as the state trooper of the circulation
- Lud Germain as the hired black as clerk
- Louis Viret as the mister who puts down posters
- Eugène Stuber as an inhabitant beater
- Franck Maurice as an inhabitant beater
- Martine Beauvais as the lady to the small dog
- Louis de Funès as the doctor

== Bibliography ==
- Ginette Vincendeau. Stars and Stardom in French Cinema. Bloomsbury Publishing, 2000.
