= Figaro-ci, Figaro-là =

1972 film

- Written by: Hervé Bromberger; Frédéric Grendel
- Directed by: Hervé Bromberger
- Starring: Jean-François Poron
- Country of origin: France
- Original language: French

Production
- Cinematography: André Lecoeuvre

Original release
- Release: 16 June 1972

Figaro-ci, Figaro-là is a 1972 French film directed by Hervé Bromberger.

== Cast ==
- Jean-François Poron - Beaumarchais
- Marie-Christine Barrault - Julie
- Yves Rénier - Gudin
- Isabelle Huppert - Pauline
- Alexandre Rignault - Caron, le père de Beaumarchais
- Henri-Jacques Huet - Le duc de Chaulnes
- Edmond Beauchamp - Paris-Duverney
- Jacques Jansen - Le prince de Conti
- André Oumansky - Sartines
- Jacques Bernard - La Blache
- Michèle André - Mme Franquet
- Pierre Negre - Franquet (as Pierre Nègre)
- Hubert de Lapparent - Goetzman
- Michèle Moretti - Mme Goetzman
- Fernand Guiot - Lepautre

== See also ==
- Isabelle Huppert on screen and stage
