= Pleasures of Paris =

1952 film

- Directed by: Ralph Baum
- Written by: Ralph Baum; Jacques Companéez; Louis Martin
- Produced by: Michel Safra
- Starring: Lucien Baroux; Jean Parédès; Geneviève Page
- Cinematography: Robert Lefebvre
- Edited by: Victoria Mercanton
- Music by: Fred Freed
- Production company: Spéva Films
- Distributed by: Discifilm; Pallas Filmverleih
- Release date: 21 November 1952
- Running time: 90 minutes
- Countries: France; German
- Languages: French; West German

Pleasures of Paris (French: Plaisirs de Paris) is a 1952 French-West German musical comedy film directed by Ralph Baum and starring Lucien Baroux, Jean Parédès and Geneviève Page. It was shot at the Billancourt Studios in Paris and on location around the city. The film's sets were designed by the art directors Jean d'Eaubonne and Georges Wakhévitch. A separate German-language version Beautiful Night (German: Traumschöne Nacht) was also produced.

== Synopsis ==
A young composer has written a new revue but struggles to get it performed. He meets a famous music hall performer but mistakes her for a flower girl.

== Cast ==
=== French version ===
- Lucien Baroux as Maroni
- Jean Parédès as Albert
- Geneviève Page as Violette / Denise
- Lilo as Lilo
- Roland Alexandre as Jean-Pierre
- Max Elloy as Léon
- Palmyre Levasseur as La patronne du café
- Gaston Orbal as Un invité
- Fortunia
- Guy Marly
- Gaston Rey
- Marcel Rouzé

=== German version ===
- Ingrid Lutz as Violetta
- Rudolf Platte as Albert
- Hubert von Meyerinck as Maroni, Theaterdirektor
- Albert Hehn as Peter
- Lilo as Lilo

== Bibliography ==
- Bessy, Maurice & Chirat, Raymond. Histoire du cinéma français: 1951-1955. Pygmalion, 1989.
- Rège, Philippe. Encyclopedia of French Film Directors, Volume 1. Scarecrow Press, 2009.
