= The Real Culprit =

1951 film

- Directed by: Pierre Thévenard
- Written by: Pierre Thévenard
- Produced by: Georges de La Grandière
- Starring: Raymond Souplex; Philippe Lemaire; Jean Davy
- Cinematography: Jean Bourgoin
- Edited by: Georges Alépée
- Music by: André Jolivet
- Production company: Edition et Diffusion Cinématographique
- Distributed by: Les Films Dispa
- Release date: 4 July 1951
- Running time: 90 minutes
- Country: France
- Language: French

The Real Culprit (French: Le vrai coupable) is a 1951 French crime drama film directed by Pierre Thévenard and starring Raymond Souplex, Philippe Lemaire and Jean Davy. The film's sets were designed by the art director Lucien Aguettand.

== Synopsis ==
Police investigating the murder of a young woman discover that she was pregnant when killed. Inspector Querneau's suspicions falls on Mario, the lover who abandoned her after discovering she was going to have a child. Although he turns out to be innocent of the actual crime of murder, it is clear his behaviour makes him the real culprit.

== Cast ==
- Raymond Souplex as Inspecteur Querneau
- Philippe Lemaire as Mario
- Jean Davy as Dr. Delorme
- Pauline Carton as La concierge
- André Valmy as Inspecteur Dumont
- France Descaut as Josette
- Jeanne Lion as La bonne
- Clément Thierry as Georges
- Bernard Musson as Un gendarme
- Odette Lemarchand as La malade
- René Hell as Un clochard

== Bibliography ==
- Bessy, Maurice & Chirat, Raymond. Histoire du cinéma français: 1951-1955. Pygmalion, 1989.
- Rège, Philippe. Encyclopedia of French Film Directors, Volume 1. Scarecrow Press, 2009.
