= 1956 in France =

- Decades: 1930s; 1940s; 1950s; 1960s; 1970s
- See also: History of France; Timeline of French history; List of years in France

Events from the year 1956 in France.

== Incumbents ==
- President: René Coty
- President of the Council of Ministers: Edgar Faure (until 1 February), Guy Mollet (starting 1 February)

== Events ==
- 2 January – Legislative Election held.
- 1 February – Socialist leader Guy Mollet becomes prime minister
- 2 March – Morocco declares its independence from France.
- 20 March – Tunisia gains independence from France.
- 23 May – Minister Pierre Mendès-France resigns due to his government's policy on Algeria.
- 23 June – Loi Cadre passed by the French National Assembly, first step in the creation of the French Union.
- 10 September – Guy Mollet visits London and proposes a merger of France and the United Kingdom. However the idea is rejected by British Prime Minister Anthony Eden.
- 28 September – Eden considers allowing France to join the Commonwealth of Nations, but this idea is also rejected.
- 31 October – Suez Crisis: The United Kingdom and France begin bombing Egypt to force the reopening of the Suez Canal.
- 6 November – British and French forces seize control of two Egyptian ports before declaring a ceasefire.
- 7 November – Suez Crisis: The United Nations General Assembly adopts a resolution calling for the United Kingdom, France and Israel to withdraw their troops from Arab lands immediately.
- 23 December – British and French troops leave Suez Canal. region.
- The Tefal cookware firm is established.

== Arts and literatures ==
- Two attacks are made on Leonardo da Vinci's Mona Lisa in the Louvre.
- 28 November – Roger Vadim's film And God Created Woman (Et Dieu... créa la femme), starring Brigitte Bardot, is released.
- 3 December – Writing under the pseudonym of Emile Ajar, author Romain Gary becomes the only person ever to win the Prix Goncourt twice, this time for Les Racines du ciel.

== Sport ==
- 5 July – Tour de France begins.
- 28 July – Tour de France ends, won by Roger Walkowiak.

== Births ==
- 1 January – Christine Lagarde, politician
- 6 February – Amaury du Closel, conductor and composer (died 2024)
- 11 February – Didier Lockwood, jazz violinist (died 2018)
- 26 February – Michel Houellebecq, novelist
- 28 May – Francis Joyon, yachtsman
- 4 July – Éric Neuhoff, novelist and journalist
- 28 October – Jean-Luc Montama, karateka
- 8 December – Pierre Pincemaille, organist (died 2018)
- 9 December – Jean-Pierre Thiollet journalist

== Deaths ==
- 5 January – Mistinguett, singer (born 1875)
- 3 February – Émile Borel, mathematician and politician (born 1871)
- 18 February – Gustave Charpentier, composer (born 1860)
- 17 March – Irène Joliot-Curie, scientist, shared Nobel Prize in Chemistry in 1935 (born 1897)
- 20 May – Pierre Allemane, international soccer player (born 1882)
- 11 September – Lucien Febvre, social historian (born 1878)
- 26 October – Walter Gieseking, pianist and composer (born 1895)
- 23 November – André Marty, leading figure in the French Communist Party (born 1886)

== See also ==
- 1956 in French television
- List of French films of 1956
