= Jean-Luc Arribart =

French footballer (born 1955)

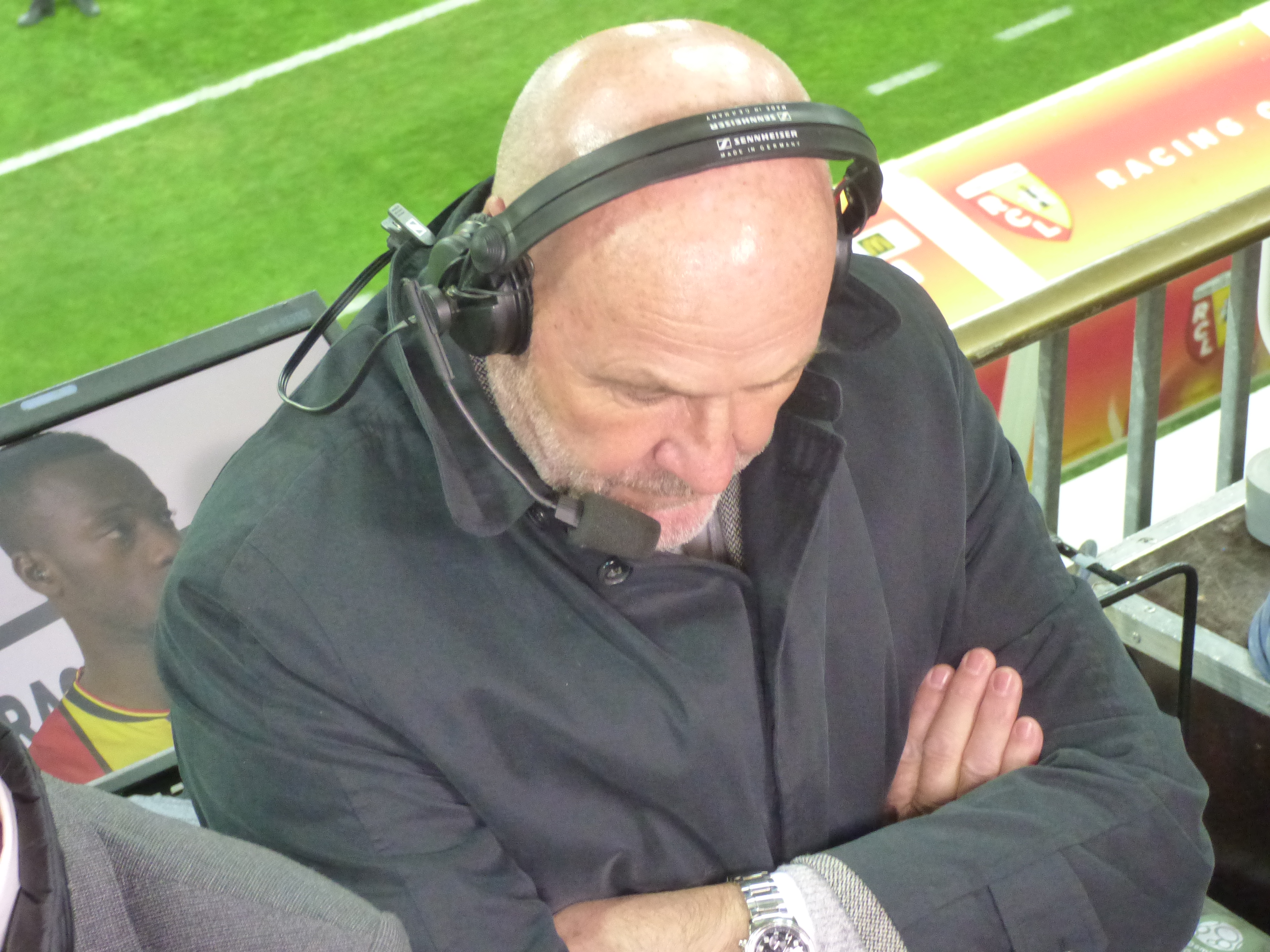
- Arribart in October 2018.

Personal information
- Date of birth: 9 March 1955 (age 71)
- Place of birth: Rennes, France
- Height: 1.80 m (5 ft 11 in)
- Position: Defender

Youth career
- Rennes

Senior career*
Years	Team	Apps	(Gls)
1973–1978	Rennes		
1978–1981	Stade Lavallois		
1981–1984	Stade Reims		
1984–1986	AS Nancy		
1986–1987	US Orléans		
1987–1988	Stade Lavallois		
- * Club domestic league appearances and goals

Jean-Luc Arribart (born 9 March 1955) is a French former professional footballer who played for Rennes, Stade Lavallois, Stade Reims, AS Nancy and US Orléans as a defender.
