= Four Days in Paris =

1955 film

- Directed by: André Berthomieu
- Written by: André Berthomieu
- Based on: Four Days in Paris by Raymond Vincy
- Produced by: Francis Lopez; Eugène Lépicier
- Starring: Luis Mariano; Geneviève Kervine; Jane Sourza
- Cinematography: Marcel Grignon
- Edited by: Gilbert Natot
- Music by: Francis Lopez
- Production companies: Filmel; Films Mars; Lyrica
- Distributed by: La Société des Films Sirius
- Release date: 28 October 1955
- Running time: 96 minutes
- Country: France
- Language: French

Four Days in Paris (French: Quatre jours à Paris) is a 1955 French musical comedy film directed by André Berthomieu and starring Luis Mariano, Geneviève Kervine and Jane Sourza. It was shot in Eastmancolor at the Boulogne Studios in Paris. The film's sets were designed by the art director Raymond Nègre. It is based on the 1948 operetta of the same title composed by Francis Lopez.

== Synopsis ==
It follows a series of characters including Mario, a fashionable Paris hairdresser in need of money, his girlfriend Gisèle, friend Nicolas and a wealthy American heiress who is sold a fake rejuvenation serum. Mario then falls in love with Gabrielle, a Southerner, and all the characters head for the hotel she owns on the Riviera.

== Cast ==
- Luis Mariano as Mario
- Roger Nicolas as Nicolas
- Jane Sourza as Rita Alvarez
- Geneviève Kervine as Gabrielle
- Andrex as Le brigadier
- Fernand Sardou as Montaron
- Gisèle Robert as Gisèle
- Arthur Allan as Alvarez
- Jackie Sardou as Zénaïde
- Gaston Orbal as Hyacinthe
- Nina Myra as L'habilleuse
- Luc Andrieux as Le gendarme
- Darry Cowl as L'aviculteur

== Bibliography ==
- Rège, Philippe. Encyclopedia of French Film Directors, Volume 1. Scarecrow Press, 2009.
- Shiri, Keith. Directory of African Film-makers and Films. Greenwood Press, 1992.
