= My Childish Father (1953 film) =

1953 film

- Directed by: Léon Mathot
- Written by: Léopold Marchand
- Based on: My Childish Father by Léopold Marchand
- Produced by: Jean Yatove
- Starring: Maurice Teynac; Jean Tissier; Arlette Poirier
- Cinematography: Léonce-Henri Burel
- Edited by: Marity Cléris
- Music by: Marceau Van Hoorebecke
- Production company: Joëlle Films
- Distributed by: Les Films Marceau
- Release date: 8 July 1953
- Running time: 88 minutes
- Country: France
- Language: French

My Childish Father (French: Mon gosse de père) is a 1953 French drama film directed by Léon Mathot and starring Maurice Teynac, Jean Tissier and Arlette Poirier. It is based on the 1925 play of the same title by Léopold Marchand which had previously been made into a 1930 film My Childish Father. The film's sets were designed by the art director Raymond Druart.

== Synopsis ==
A party-minded Parisian architect attempts to try and settle down when he marries a younger wife. However he still finds it impossible to overcome his distaste for hard work and his love of fun. Not even the arrival of his hard-working illegitimate American son can change him.

== Cast ==
- Maurice Teynac as Lucien Landier
- Sirena Adgemova as Yvonne Calabrier
- Jean Tissier as Stanley Percheron
- Armand Bernard as Révérend James Holiday
- Jacques François as Gérard Morrison
- Arlette Poirier as Philippine Opposum
- Evelyn Nattier
- Robert Seller
- Mary Thierry
- Pamela Wilde

== Bibliography ==
- Goble, Alan. The Complete Index to Literary Sources in Film. Walter de Gruyter, 1999.
- Oscherwitz, Dayna & Higgins, MaryEllen. The A to Z of French Cinema. Scarecrow Press, 2009.
