= Babes a GoGo =

Bébés à gogo
- Directed by: Paul Mesnier
- Written by: Marcel Franck; Paul Mesnier
- Produced by: Taurus Films (France)
- Starring: Jane Sourza; Louis de Funès
- Music by: Louis Gasté
- Distributed by: Corona
- Release date: 8 June 1956 (France)
- Running time: 86 minutes
- Country: France
- Language: French

Bébés à gogo (French: Babes a GoGo) is a French comedy film from 1956, directed by Paul Mesnier, written by Marcel Franck, starring Jane Sourza and Louis de Funès. The film is known under the title: "Babes a GoGo" (International English title).

== Cast ==
- Jane Sourza as Isabelle Petitbourgeois, Stéphane's wife
- Raymond Souplex as Stéphane Petitbourgeois, Isabelle's husband
- Louis de Funès as M. Célestin Ratier, representative of the industries of childhood
- Jean Carmet as Hubert, the husband of Stalemate
- Andréa Parisy as Pat, daughter of Isabelle and Stéphane
- Andrée Servilange as Geneviève, called Mademoiselle, the nurse
- Marthe Alycia as Daphné, Hubert's mother
- Arlette Massart as Jeannette, the maid
- Florence Blot as the civil registry employee at the town hall
- Saint-Granier as himself
- Valérie Vivin
- Pierre Vernet
- Max Desrau
- Max Revol
- Cécile Eddy
- Bernard Revon
