= Lilo (actress) =

French singer and actress (1921–2022)

- Born: Liselotte Johanna Lewin; 2 March 1921; Dortmund, Germany
- Died: 26 September 2022 (aged 101); New York City, New York, United States
- Occupations: Actress; singer

Lilo, stage name of Liselotte Johanna Lewin (2 March 1921 – 26 September 2022), was a German-born French actress and singer.

== Biography ==
Lilo was born in Dortmund in 1921 as Liselotte Johanna Lewin. In 1953, she played the lead role in the musical Can-Can at the Shubert Theatre, where she notably sang the songs "C'est Magnifique" and "I Love Paris", written by Cole Porter.

== Death ==
Lilo died in New York City on 26 September 2022 at the age of 101.

== Filmography ==
- Adele's Gift (1951)
- Beautiful Night (1952)
- Pleasures of Paris (1952)
- Zaza (1956)
- Young Girls of Good Families (1963)
- Happy New Year (1973)
- And Now My Love (1974)
