= Antonio Santillán =

Spanish film director

- Born: 1909; Madrid, Spain
- Died: 1966 (aged 56–57); Barcelona, Spain
- Occupation(s): Film director, screenwriter

Antonio Santillán (1909 in Madrid – 1966 in Barcelona) was a Spanish film director and screenwriter. He directed films such as Enemigos (1942), La noche del martes (1944), Sucedió en mi aldea (1956), Cuatro en la frontera (1958) and Trampa mortal (1963).

== Filmography ==
=== As director ===
- Enemigos (1942)
- La noche del martes (1944)
- Almas en peligro (1952)
- El presidio (1954)
- El ojo de cristal (1956)
- Sucedió en mi aldea (1956)
- Hospital of Urgency (1956)
- Cuatro en la frontera (1958)
- Cita imposible (1958)
- Los desamparados (1962)
- Senda torcida (1962)
- Trampa mortal (1963)

=== As screenwriter ===
- Almas en peligro (1952)
- Sucedió en mi aldea (1956)
- Hospital of Urgency (1956)
- Los desamparados (1960)
- Ruthless Colt of the Gringo (1966)
