= Jean-Pierre Feydeau =

French film director and screenwriter

- Born: 30 April 1903; Paris
- Died: 30 September 1970 (aged 67); Paris
- Occupations: Film director, screenwriter

Jean-Pierre Feydeau (30 April 1903 - 17 Septembre 1970) was a French film director and screenwriter. Son of dramatist and playwright Georges Feydeau, he was also uncle of Alain Feydeau, Alain Terrane and Jacques Terrane.

== Filmography ==
=== Assistant director ===
- 1934 : Liliom by Fritz Lang

=== Director ===
- 1942 : The Lover of Borneo codirected with René Le Hénaff

=== Screenwriter ===
- 1934 : Le Coup de parapluie by Victor de Fast
- 1934 : Deux mille deux cent vingt deux CF2 by Victor de Fast
- 1935 : Les yeux noirs by Viktor Tourjansky
- 1936 : Wells in Flames by Viktor Tourjansky
- 1936 : Monsieur est saisi by René Sti
- 1936 : La Peur by Viktor Tourjansky after the novel by Stefan Zweig
- 1938 : My Priest Among the Rich by Jean Boyer
- 1939 : Extenuating Circumstances by Jean Boyer
- 1942 : La Symphonie fantastique by Christian-Jaque
- 1946 : Destiny by Richard Pottier
- 1946 : Rooster Heart by Maurice Cloche
- 1948 : Route sans issue by Jean Stelli
- 1951 : Andalusia by Robert Vernay
- 1951 : The Dream of Andalusia by Luis Lucia
- 1952 : A Girl on the Road by Jean Stelli
- 1952 : My Priest Among the Rich by Henri Diamant-Berger
- 1953 : The Beauty of Cadiz by Raymond Bernard and Eusebio Fernández Ardavín
- 1957 : Fernand clochard by Pierre Chevalier
- 1960 : Bouche cousue by Jean Boyer
