= My Childish Father (1930 film) =

1930 film

- Directed by: Jean de Limur
- Written by: Jean de Limur; Léopold Marchand
- Based on: My Childish Father by Léopold Marchand
- Starring: Adolphe Menjou; Roger Tréville; Alice Cocéa
- Cinematography: Georges Asselin; René Colas; Otto Kanturek
- Edited by: Stewart B. Moss
- Music by: Jose Lucchesi
- Production company: Pathé-Natan
- Distributed by: Pathé-Natan
- Release date: 1 May 1930
- Running time: 88 minutes
- Country: France
- Language: French

My Childish Father (French: Mon gosse de père) is a 1930 French drama film directed by Jean de Limur and starring Adolphe Menjou, Roger Tréville and Alice Cocéa. It is based on the 1925 play of the same title by Léopold Marchand which was later remade in 1953 as My Childish Father. The film's sets were designed by the art director Jacques Colombier. It was one of twelve sound films produced by Pathé-Natan that year following the conversion from silent film. A separate English-Language version The Parisian was produced, also starring Menjou.

Contemporary reviews from 1930, particularly in trade publications like Variety, noted that the film's subject matter was considered quite "risqué" for the era.

== Cast ==
- Adolphe Menjou as Jérome
- Roger Tréville as Gerard
- Charles Redgie as Stanley
- Alice Cocéa as Yvonne
- Olga Valéry as Mado
- Renee Savoye as Secretary
- Pauline Carton as The Concierge
- André Marnay as Le petit sale
- André Volbert as Julien
- Marcello Spada
- Nicole de Rouves
- Odette Barencey
- Fanny Clair
- Meg Lemonnier

== Bibliography ==
- Crafton, Donald. The Talkies: American Cinema's Transition to Sound, 1926-1931. University of California Press, 1999.
- Crisp, C.G. The Classic French Cinema, 1930-1960. Indiana University Press, 1993.
- Goble, Alan. The Complete Index to Literary Sources in Film. Walter de Gruyter, 1999.
