= Cuatro en la frontera =

1958 film

- Directed by: Antonio Santillán
- Written by: Joaquín Algars; Nené Cascallar
- Produced by: Ignacio F. Iquino; Marius Lesoeur
- Cinematography: Pablo Ripoll
- Edited by: Juan Luis Oliver
- Music by: Ricardo Lamotte de Grignón
- Production companies: IFI Producción S.A., Sopadec
- Release date: 5 May 1958
- Running time: 91 minutes
- Country: Spain
- Language: Spanish

Cuatro en la frontera is a 1958 Spanish film directed by Antonio Santillán. Written by Joaquín Algars and Nené Cascallar, it stars Claudine Dupuis, Danielle Godet, and Estanis González.

== Plot ==
A French National Treasury van is assaulted and they steal the gold bullion it was carrying. According to confidences received by the Police Headquarters of Barcelona, it seems that part of the gold is clandestinely introduced into Spain through the Pyrenees. In order to discover and eradicate such smuggling infiltration, an agent pretends to be a day laborer at a farm located on the border and in a suspicious area.

== Cast ==
- Claudine Dupuis as Isabelle
- Danielle Godet as Olivia
- Estanis González as Estanis González
- Frank Latimore as Javier
- Miguel Ligero
- Armando Moreno as Roca 'José Sancho'
- Adriano Rimoldi
- Julio Riscal
- Gérard Tichy as Julio

== Bibliography ==
- Martí Solé Irla, (1954). "Cuatro en la frontera": parlem de pel·lícules rodades íntegrament o en part a la Cerdanya. Puigcerdà, l'autor, DL 2016.
