= Lolita Sevilla =

Spanish actress and singer

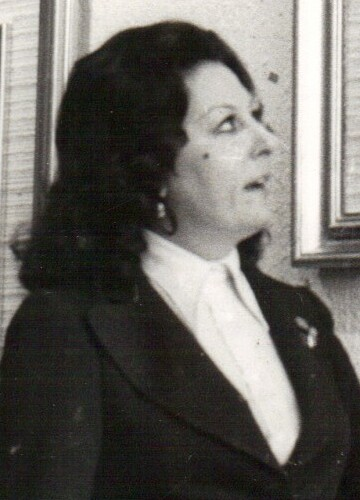
- Sevilla in 1973
- Born: Ángeles Moreno Gómez; 20 March 1935; Seville, Spain
- Died: 16 December 2013 (aged 78); Madrid, Spain
- Other names: Lola Sevilla, Reina del pasodoble
- Occupations: Actress, singer
- Years active: 1953–1997
- Spouse: José María Gallardo

Ángeles Moreno Gómez (20 March 1935 – 16 December 2013), better known as Lolita Sevilla, was a Spanish actress and singer, whose career spanned over 40 years.

Born in Seville, she began singing at the age of ten, in 1945 and also had a film, television and stage acting career.

Lolita Sevilla died on 16 December 2013, aged 78, at the Hospital General Universitario Gregorio Marañón in Madrid.
