= Paris Vice Squad =

1951 film

- Directed by: Hervé Bromberger
- Written by: Henri Jeanson; Jacques Rémy
- Produced by: Raoul Lévy
- Starring: Odette Barencey
- Cinematography: Jacques Mercanton
- Edited by: Roger Dwyre
- Release date: 18 April 1951
- Running time: 90 minutes
- Country: France
- Language: French

Paris Vice Squad (French: Identité judiciaire) is a 1951 French thriller film directed by Hervé Bromberger. It was entered into the 1951 Cannes Film Festival.

== Cast ==
- Odette Barencey as La concierge (as Odette Barancey)
- Luc Barney as Mauduit
- Robert Berri as Inspecteur Paulan [Insp. Robbie Berni, US]
- André Carnège as Le directeur de la P.J.
- Nicole Cezanne as Denise Prévost (as Nicole Cezannes)
- René-Jean Chauffard as Le chimiste (as Chauffard)
- Jean Debucourt as Max Berthet [Max Barton, US]
- Dora Doll as Dora Bourbon [Dora Barton, US]
- Danielle Godet as Madeleine
- Camille Guérini as Husson
- Raoul Marco as Le médecin
- Renaud Mary as Mario Petrosino
- Marthe Mercadier as Rose Muchet [Prostitute from Brooklyn, US]
- Eliane Monceau as Mme de Sannois
- Max Révol as Le voleur
