= La Dame de chez Maxim (1950 film) =

1950 film

The Girl from Maxim's
- Directed by: Marcel Aboulker
- Written by: Georges Feydeau (play); Marcel Aboulker; Robert Beauvais
- Produced by: Alain Poiré; Gilbert Cohen-Seat
- Starring: Arlette Poirier; Saturnin Fabre; Marcelle Monthil; Jacques Morel
- Cinematography: Pierre Levent
- Edited by: Jacques Grassi
- Music by: Paul Durand
- Production company: Maítrise Artisanale de l'Industrie Cinematographique
- Distributed by: Gaumont Distribution
- Release date: 15 September 1950
- Running time: 92 minutes
- Country: France
- Language: French

The Girl from Maxim's (French: La dame de chez Maxim's) is a 1950 French comedy film directed by Marcel Aboulker and starring Arlette Poirier, Saturnin Fabre and Marcelle Monthil. It is an adaptation of the 1899 farce La Dame de chez Maxim by Georges Feydeau.

== Cast ==
- Arlette Poirier as La môme Crevette
- Saturnin Fabre as Le général Petypon du Grêlé
- Marcelle Monthil as Mme. Petypon
- Jacques Morel as Le docteur Petypon
- Marcelle Praince as La duchesse
- Robert Vattier as Le docteur Montgicourt
- Jean Marsan as Le lieutenant Corrigon
- Luc Andrieux as Etienne
- Colette Ripert as Clémentine
- Jacques Fabbri as Le duc
- Jacques Beauvais as Eugène
- Pierre Flourens
- Philippe de Chérisey
- Albert Rieux

== See also ==
- Maxim's

== Bibliography ==
- Hayward, Susan. French Costume Drama of the 1950s: Fashioning Politics in Film. Intellect Books, 2010.
- Oscherwitz, Dayna & Higgins, MaryEllen. The A to Z of French Cinema. Scarecrow Press, 2009.
