= Luis Mariano =

Spanish operetta singer and actor

- Born: Luis Mariano Eusebio González García; 13 August 1914; Irun (Guipúzcoa), Spain
- Died: 14 July 1970 (aged 55); Paris, France

Luis Mariano Eusebio González García (13 August 1914 – 14 July 1970), also known as Luis Mariano, was a popular tenor of Spanish origin who achieved celebrity in 1946 with "La belle de Cadix" ("The Beautiful Lady of Cadix") an operetta by Francis Lopez. He appeared in the 1954 film Adventures of the Barber of Seville and Le Chanteur de Mexico (1957) and became popular in France as well as his native Spain.

== Biography ==
Luis Mariano was born in Irún, Guipúzcoa, Spain, on 13 August 1914, the son of a garagiste and taxi-driver and showed interest in singing as a child. His family moved to France at the start of the Spanish Civil War and settled in Bordeaux where he studied at the Conservatoire, and also sang in cabarets.

Jeanne Lagiscarde, who was in charge of the classical department of a record store in Bordeaux, took Mariano under her wing, and gave up her job to nurture his talent in Paris. To earn a living, he sang in stage shows and appeared in films, starting with The Stairs Without End (L'escalier sans fin) in 1943. That year he auditioned for the role of Ernesto in Don Pasquale, and sang in the opera at the Palais de Chaillot and later at the Théâtre des Variétés, with Vina Bovy, recording excerpts from the opera. He also left many recordings of popular song and operetta.

He continued to appear in other films from 1946, including a singing role in Napoléon and a film adaptation of Lehar's Der Zarewitsch.

In his encyclopedia Gänzl describes Mariano as a "svelte singing idol of French operetta of the post-war stage and screen". Mariano died in Paris in 1970.

His music is featured prominently in the 1996 Belgian film Le huitième jour in which he is played by Laszlo Harmati during scenes employing magical realism.

In 2014, French baritone David Serero recorded an album with Mariano classics performed in a Jazz version for the 100th anniversary of his birth: David Serero chante Luis Mariano – jazz version.

== Filmography ==
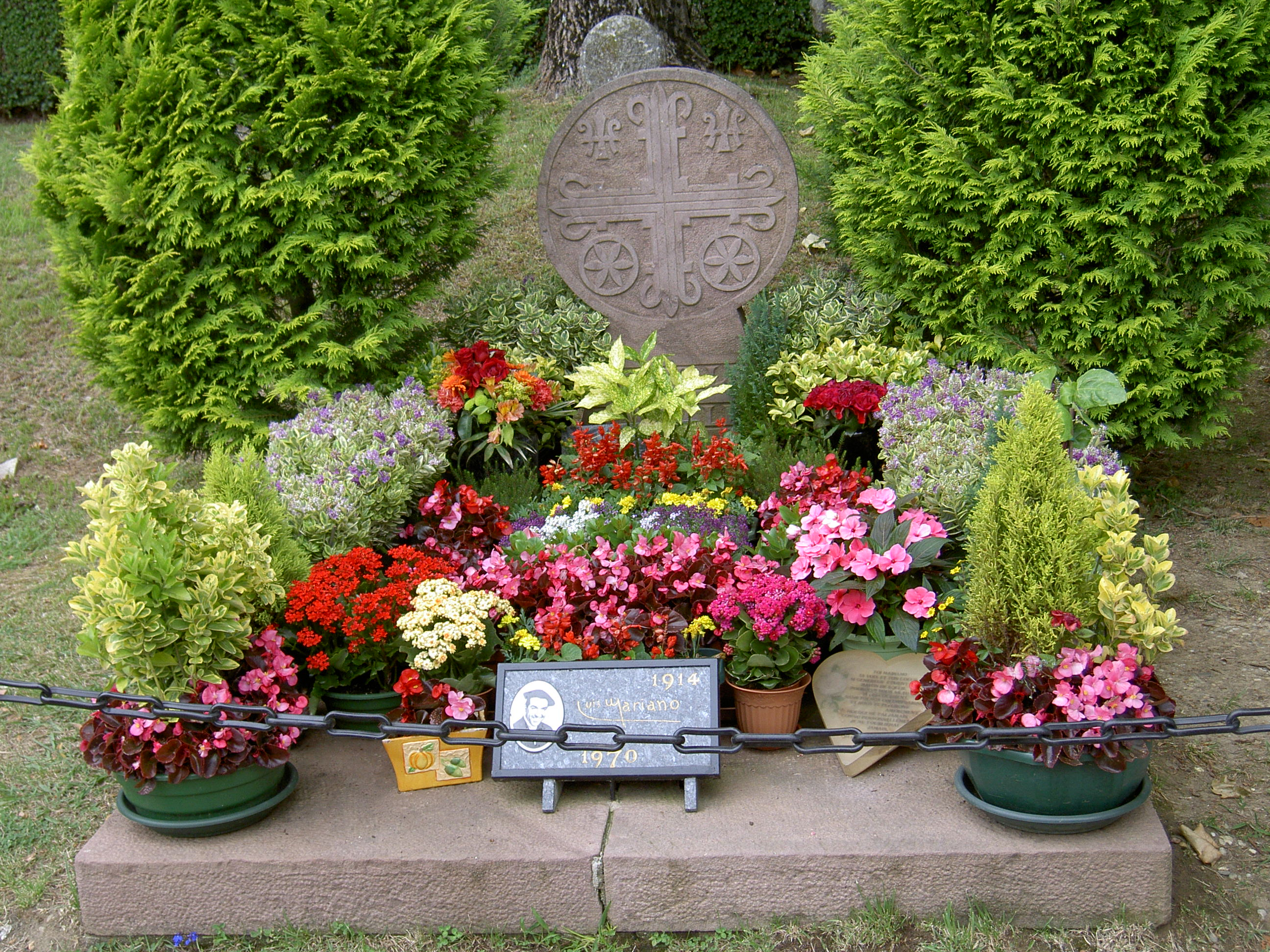
Grave in Arcangues

Year	Title	Role	Notes
1938	Ramuntcho		
1943	The Exile's Song	Un jeune basque	
1943	The Stairs Without End	Le chanteur	
1947	Something to Sing About	Gino Fabretti	
1947	Secret Cargo	José	
1948	Fandango	José	
1949	I Like Only You	Don Renaldo	
1950	Not Any Weekend for Our Love	Franck Reno	
1951	The Dream of Andalusia	Juanito Var	
1951	Rendezvous in Grenada	Marco Da Costa	
1951	Paris Still Sings	Luis Mariano	
1952	Imperial Violets	Juan de Ayala	
1953	Saluti e baci	Luis Mariano	
1953	The Beauty of Cadiz	Carlos	
1954	Adventures of the Barber of Seville	Fígaro	
1954	The Little Czar	Luis Mariano / Aljoscha	
1955	Napoléon	Le chanteur Garat	
1955	Four Days in Paris	Mario	
1956	The Singer from Mexico	Miguel Morano / Vincent Etchebar	
1957	Printemps à Paris		Uncredited
1957	Love in Jamaica	Manoël Martinez	
1958	Serenade of Texas	Jacques Gardel	
1960	Candide ou l'optimisme au XXe siècle	Un dictateur sud américain / South American Dictator	
1965	Les pieds dans le plâtre	L'agriculteur	
1967	Le Prince de Madrid	Francisco Goya	(final film role)
