= Hervé Bromberger =

French film director

- Born: 11 November 1918; Marseille, France
- Died: 25 November 1993 (aged 75)
- Occupations: Film director; screenwriter
- Years active: 1951–1982

Hervé Bromberger (11 November 1918 – 25 November 1993) was a French film director and screenwriter. He directed 16 films between 1951 and 1982. His 1951 film Paris Vice Squad was entered into the 1951 Cannes Film Festival.

== Selected filmography ==
- Paris Vice Squad (1951)
- The Billionaire Tramp (1951)
- Alone in Paris (1951)
- Wild Fruit (1954)
- Nagana (1955)
- Three Fables of Love (1962)
- Mort, où est ta victoire? (1964)
- Un soir à Tibériade (1966)
- Figaro-ci, Figaro-là (1972)
