= Jane Sourza =

French actress (1902–1969)

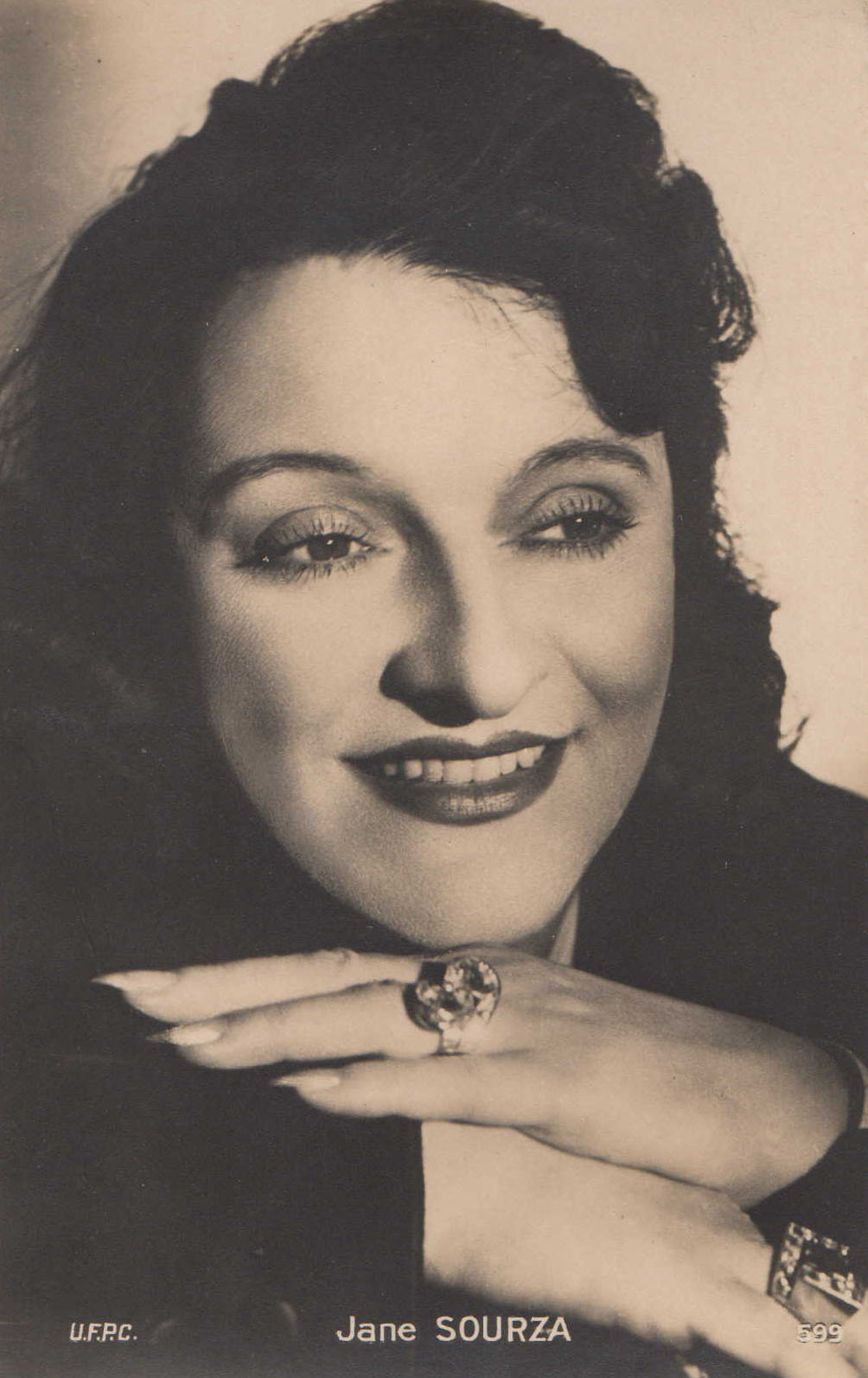
- Born: 1 December 1902; Paris, France
- Died: 3 June 1969 (aged 66); Paris, France
- Occupation: Actress
- Years active: 1932–1969 (film and TV)

Jane Sourza (1 December 1902 – 3 June 1969) was a French stage and film actress. She was in a long-term relationship with actor Raymond Souplex.

== Selected filmography ==
- My Priest Among the Rich (1938)
- The Duraton Family (1939)
- Radio Surprises (1940)
- Piédalu in Paris (1951)
- Adele's Gift (1951)
- An Artist with Ladies (1952)
- Naked in the Wind (1953)
- Four Days in Paris (1955)
- The Duratons (1955)
- Love in Jamaica (1957)
- Babes a GoGo (1966)

== Bibliography ==
- Goble, Alan. The Complete Index to Literary Sources in Film. Walter de Gruyter, 1999.
