= Face à l'opinion =

French news/interview television program

- Genre: Public affairs/news analysis program
- Presented by: Pierre Corval
- Country of origin: France
- Original language: French

Production
- Running time: 30 minutes

Original release
- Network: RTF
- Release: October 20, 1954 – 1956

Face à l'opinion is a French political show, which was hosted by Pierre Corval and broadcast on RTF from October 20, 1954, to 1956.

== Premise ==
The format was based on the American news show Meet the Press, where journalists questioned the politicians on live television. It was the first programme of its kind on French television.

The show was cancelled by Guy Mollet because he was concerned about a programme on that year's legislative election.
