= Danielle Godet =

French actress (1927–2009)

- Born: 30 January 1927; Paris, France
- Died: 12 November 2009 (aged 82); Paris, France
- Occupation: Actress
- Years active: 1943–1983 (film)

Danielle Godet (30 January 1927 – 12 November 2009) was a French stage and film actress.

== Partial filmography ==
- The Man Without a Name (1943) – Une figurante
- The Idiot (1946)
- Man About Town (1947) – Une spectatrice
- Ploum, ploum, tra-la-la (1947) – Gisèle
- The Idol (1948) – Françoise
- Une femme par jour (1949) – Sabine – la fiancée de Guy
- La souricière (1950) – Jacqueline
- Night Taxi (1950) – Laura Morani
- The Elusive Pimpernel (1950) – Suzanne de Tournai
- Paris Vice Squad (1951) – Madeleine, la secrétaire du commissaire Basquier
- Nous irons à Monte-Carlo (1951) – Jacqueline Chatenay-Maillard
- Les mousquetaires du roi (1951)
- Double or Quits (1953) – Marie Chassagne
- The Three Musketeers (1953) – Constance Bonacieux
- Boum sur Paris (1953) – Hélène
- Adventures of the Barber of Seville (1954) – Rosina
- Yours Truly, Blake (1954) – Michèle Marley / Marion Miller
- Chéri-Bibi (1955) – Cécily du Touchais
- Ces sacrées vacances (1956) – Gina Carigan
- C'est une fille de Paname (1957) – Lyane Grandhomme
- Paris clandestin (1957) – Francine
- Le souffle du désir (1958) – Christiane Méry
- Cuatro en la frontera (1958) – Olivia
- Happy Arenas (1958) – Marina
- Operation Abduction (1958) – Vera Lérins
- Nuits de Pigalle (1959) – Annie Pervenche
- Ce soir on tue (1959) – Colette
- Muerte al amanecer (1959) – Linette
- Un couple (1960) – Christine
- The Versailles Affair (1960) – Gina
- Amour, autocar et boîtes de nuit (1960) – Georgette
- Queen of the Tabarin Club (1960) – Monique
- Captain Fracasse (1961) – Serafina
- Les honneurs de la guerre (1961) – Mademoiselle Lherminier
- The Fabiani Affair (1962) – Monique
- Autopsy of a Criminal (1963) – Nelsie
- Kiss Kiss, Kill Kill (1966) – Pat
- Only a Coffin (1967) – Greta
- That Splendid November (1969) – Elisa
- Caméléons (1971) – Sonia
- Quartier de femmes (1973) – Emilia Franval
- Dirty Dreamer (1978) – La dame de la villa
- Joy (1983) – Joy's mother

== Bibliography ==
- Christopher Lloyd. Henri-Georges Clouzot. Manchester University Press, 2007.
