= Paul Mesnier =

French film director

Paul Mesnier (3 August 1904 in Saint-Étienne – 7 July 1988) was a French film director.

He was married to the actress Andrée Servilanges.

== Filmography ==
Director

- 1937 : Le Chemin de lumière
- 1938 : La Belle revanche
- 1941 : The Master Valet
- 1942 : Patricia
- 1943 : Madly in Love
- 1947 : La Kermesse rouge
- 1952 : Poil de carotte
- 1956 : Babes a GoGo
- 1957 : Une nuit aux Baléares
- 1960 : Le Septième Jour de Saint-Malo
- 1962 : Cargo pour la Réunion

Actor

- 1950 : Olivia by Jacqueline Audry
- 1950 : Casabianca by Georges Peclet
- 1951 : They Were Five by Jack Pinoteau
- 1953 : It Happened in Paris by Henri Lavorel and John Berry
- 1953 : The Red Head
- 1966 : Triple Cross by Terence Young

Screenwriter

- Chéri-Bibi (1955)
