= Guy Lacourt =

- Born: 17 August 1910; Lyon
- Died: 15 August 1984 (aged 73); Neuilly-sur-Seine
- Occupation: Film director
- Years active: 1936 - 1972

Guy Lacourt (7 August 1910 - 15 August 1984) was a French film director, assistant director and unit production manager.

== Director ==
- 1952 : Le Costaud des Batignolles
- 1953 : My Brother from Senegal

== Assistant director ==
- 1936 : Le Mot de Cambronne by Sacha Guitry
- 1937 : The Pearls of the Crown, by Sacha Guitry
- 1938 : Désiré by Sacha Guitry
- 1961 : Le Triomphe de Michel Strogoff by Victor Tourjansky

== Unit production manager ==
From 1940 to 1972, he works as unit production manager for a dozen films.
