= Pierre Berton (playwright) =

French actor and playwright

- Berton photographed by Nadar
- Born: Pierre François Samuel Montan; 6 March 1842; Paris, France
- Died: October 23, 1912 (aged 70); Paris, France
- Occupations: Actor, playwright

Pierre Berton (6 March 1842 – 23 October 1912) was a French actor and playwright.

== Biography ==
Pierre Berton, real name Pierre François Samuel Montan, was the grandson of the composer Henri Montan Berton (1767-1844), the son of the actor Charles-François Montan Berton, called Francisque Berton (1820-1874) and of Caroline Samson, novelist and Joseph Samson's daughter, himself a sociétaire de la Comédie française.

Pierre Berton first appeared as an actor on the Parisian stages, winning success at the théâtre du Gymnase, the Théâtre de l'Odéon, the Théâtre-Français, and the Théâtre du Vaudeville. In 1865, he made his debut as playwright with Les Jurons de Cadillac, a one-act comedy, and carried on two years later with another comedy, La Vertu de ma femme. During three decades he would alternate his work as an author and an actor. At the end of the 19th century, he stopped performing but continued to write for theatre until his death.

From 1908 to 1909, he serialized his Souvenirs de la vie de théâtre in Le Figaro Littéraire, published as a book in 1913.

== Actor ==
- 1864: Les Flibustiers de la Sonore by Gustave Aimard and Amédée Rolland, Théâtre de la Porte-Saint-Martin
- 1869: Patrie ! by Victorien Sardou, Théâtre de la Porte-Saint-Martin
- 1882: Fédora by Sardou, Théâtre du Vaudeville
- 1886: Le Crocodile by Sardou, Théâtre de la Porte-Saint-Martin
- 1887: La Tosca by Sardou, Théâtre de la Porte Saint Martin
- 1891: L'Impératrice Faustine by Stanislas Rzewuski, Théâtre de la Porte-Saint-Martin
- 1895: Le Collier de la reine by Pierre Decourcelle, Théâtre de la Porte-Saint-Martin

== Playwright ==
- March 1862: Le Pavé by George Sand, with Pierre Chéri Lafont (1797-1873); Pierre Berton (1842-1912); Marie Delaporte (1838-1910); Anna Chéri-Lesueur (1826-1912) as actors and actresses.
- 1865: Les Jurons de Cadillac, comedy in 1 act, Théâtre du Gymnase
- 1867: La Vertu de ma femme, comedy in 1 act, Théâtre du Gymnase
- 1868: Didier, play in 3 acts, Théâtre de l'Odéon
- 1880: La Tempête, symphonic poem in 3 parts, after Shakespeare, poem by Armand Silvestre and Pierre Berton, music by Alphonse Duvernoy, Théâtre du Châtelet
- 1882: Sardanapalus, opera in 3 acts, after Lord Byron, libretto Pierre Berton, music by Alphonse Duvernoy, Concerts Lamoureux
- 1889: Léna, play in 4 acts with Sarah Bernhardt, Théâtre des Variétés
- 1894: Les Chouans, drama in 5 acts by Pierre Berton and Émile Blavet after Balzac, Théâtre de l'Ambigu
- 1898: Zaza, play in 5 acts by Pierre Berton and Charles Simon, Théâtre du Vaudeville. It was adapted in the United States by David Belasco, premiering in Washington, D.C. in 1898, and then moving to New York City in 1899, then adapted as a grand opera by Ruggero Leoncavallo (1900).
- 1901: Yvette, comedy in 3 acts after Guy de Maupassant, Théâtre du Vaudeville
- 1905: La Belle Marseillaise, drama in 4 acts, Théâtre de l'Ambigu
- 1909: La Rencontre, play in 4 acts, Comédie-Française, 17 June
- 1912: Mioche, play in 3 acts, Théâtre du Vaudeville

== Publication ==
- Pierre Berton, Souvenirs de la vie de théâtre, La Revue de Paris, Paris, 1913

== Bibliography ==
- A. de Gubernatis, Dictionnaire international des écrivains du jour, Louis Niccolai éditeur, Florence, 1891; available at Gallica, page 285
