= Edmond Beauchamp =

French actor

- Born: 3 March 1900; Montpellier, France
- Died: 3 June 1985 (aged 85); Saint-Brieuc, France
- Occupation: Actor
- Years active: 1928–1979

Edmond Beauchamp (3 March 1900 – 3 June 1985), sometimes credited only as Beauchamp, was a French film and Broadway stage actor. He appeared in 70 films between 1928 and 1979.

== Partial filmography ==
- Misdeal (1928) - Le gitan (uncredited)
- Madame Bovary (1934) - Binet
- Un homme de trop à bord (1935)
- Roses noires (1935)
- Royal Waltz (1936) - Maps
- The Crime of Monsieur Lange (1936) - Priest in the Train (uncredited)
- La Bataille silencieuse (1937) - (uncredited)
- Feu ! (1937) - Moulay Aidi
- Ballerina (1937) - L'inspecteur
- The Woman from the End of the World (1938) - Charley
- La Marseillaise (1938) - Le curé Fayet
- Tamara (1938) - Borojski
- People Who Travel (1938) - (uncredited)
- Hercule (1938) - Le secrétaire de Vasco (uncredited)
- La Rue sans joie (1938) - (uncredited)
- L'ange que j'ai vendu (1938)
- La Maison du Maltais (1938) - Le policier (uncredited)
- The Novel of Werther (1938) - Le meurtrier
- Louise (1939) - Le philosophe
- Fire in the Straw (1939)
- Paradis perdu (1940) - Le facétieux (uncredited)
- The White Truck (1943) - Un gitan
- Le Val d'enfer (1943) - Rodrigo (uncredited)
- Un seul amour (1943) - Gardel
- Le Bossu (1944) - Le gaucher
- Twilight (1944) - Le jeune premier (uncredited)
- Le Père Goriot (1945) - (uncredited)
- The Last Metro (1945)
- Girl with Grey Eyes (1945)
- The Captain (1946) - Le procureur du roy
- The Sea Rose (1946) - Un mécanicien
- The Visitor (1946) - Ledru
- Devil in the Flesh (1947) - Le sommelier du grand restaurant
- Le Beau Voyage (1947) - Le marin solitaire sur la plage
- Les jeux sont faits (1947) - Dixonne
- The Cupboard Was Bare (1948) - Le commissaire
- Pattes blanches (1949) - Le gendarme (uncredited)
- Murders (1950) - Le professeur Le Gossec
- Mr. Peek-a-Boo (1951) - Arturo
- Savage Triangle (1951) - Gilles
- Crimson Curtain (1952) - Un acteur
- La Chair et le Diable (1954)
- School for Love (1955) - M. Petersen - père d'Elis
- If Paris Were Told to Us (1956) - Un consommateur (uncredited)
- Marie Antoinette Queen of France (1956) - Comte de Luxembourg
- The Hunchback of Notre Dame (1956) - Bit part (uncredited)
- Le Beau Serge (1958) - Glomaud
- Le maître du Pérou (1958)
- Le petit prof (1959) - Le grand-père
- Le Bossu (1959) - Don Miguel
- Captain Blood (1960) - Le gouverneur de la Province
- A Man Named Rocca (1961) - l'avocat de Xavier
- Belle and Sebastien (1965, TV Series) - Cesar
- Les Cracks (1968) - Le vétéran
- Le Prussien (1971, TV Movie) - Le 'Prussien'
- Figaro-ci, Figaro-là (1972, TV Movie) - Paris-Duverney
