= Love Hate (film) =

1971 French film by Jean-Pierre Mocky

- Directed by: Jean-Pierre Mocky
- Screenplay by: Jean-Pierre Mocky; Claude Veillot; Raphaël Delpard
- Starring: Jean-Pierre Mocky; Marion Game; Paul Müller; André Le Gall; René-Jean Chauffard
- Cinematography: Marcel Weiss
- Edited by: Marie-Louise Barberot
- Music by: Léo Ferré
- Production companies: Balzac Films; Belstar; Profilm
- Distributed by: Les Films Corona
- Release date: September 8, 1971 (France)
- Running time: 92 minutes
- Country: France

Love Hate (French: L'Albatros) is a 1971 French film directed by Jean-Pierre Mocky.

== Cast ==
- Jean-Pierre Mocky as Stef Tassel
- Marion Game as Paula Cavalier
- Paul Müller as Ernest Cavalier
- André Le Gall as Lucien Grimm
- René-Jean Chauffard as Commissioner Gaber
- Robert Berri as Warden's friend

== Production ==
The idea for Love Hate was made during the screenwriting process of Jean-Pierre Mocky's previous film Solo (1970). During filming, his writing partner Alain Moury left to buy cigarettes and did not return. They located him three days later in jail as he found himself in the middle of a protest against the Tunisian president Habib Bourguiba. During the protest, Moury had been attacked by police officers and defended himself by hitting one of them back and was subsequently detained. This gave Mocky the idea for the character in Love Hate where the central character kills a police officer in self-defence under similar circumstances.

Love Hate was a French production, produced by two Paris-based companies (Balzac Films and Profilm) and the Nanterre-based Belstar Productions. For the film, Mocky partnered with Claude Veillot, a film critic for L'Express, a film that led the critic to become a full-time screenwriter and leave journalism.

Filming began on January 6, 1971, and was shot in Alsace and Moselle. Interiors were shot at the Éclair Studios in Épinay-sur-Seine.

== Release ==
Love Hate was distributed theatrically in France by Les Films Corona on September 8, 1971, as L'Albatros. Mocky dedicated the film to "my friend Bourvil", an actor who had died in September 1970. The film had 570,000 spectators in France. The authors of French Thrillers of the 1970s: Volume I, Crime Films (2026) said this was not as financially successful as Mocky's previous film Solo (1970), it remained Mocky's most profitable film until the release of Y a-t-il un Français dans la salle ? (1982).

The film was distributed in several countries, including Italy, Greece, Turkey and the United Kingdom. It was released as Love Hate in the United Kingdom on March 24, 1973. This version of the film ran for slightly less than 90 minutes. The film was also shown in Canada on television in January 1973.
