= Michel Zévaco =

French writer and anarchist (1860–1918)

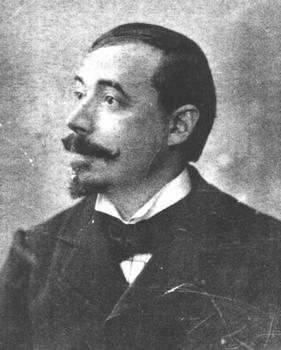
Michel Zévaco

Michel Zévaco (1 February 1860– 8 August 1918) was a French journalist, novelist, and anarchist activist.

Zévaco in Ajaccio in 1980, he grew up in turbulent political times in France. He served in the army between 1882 and 1886. Between 1889 and 1900, he was an activist and a journalist. His first historical serialized novel, Le Chevalier de la Barre (1899–1900), marked his transition to full-time novelist. His work often took a stance against the use of religion and monarchy for the exploitation of others and attacking their liberty, dignity, and freedoms.

Leader of Iran Ayatollah Khamenei recommended Zévaco's novels for the youth in 1998.

== Works ==
- 1889 – Roublard et Compagnie. Les tripoteurs du socialisme.
- 1899 – Jésuites contre le peuple. La nouvelle Inquisition. Septembre (Jesuits Against the People: The New Inquisition)
- 1899-1900 – Le Chevalier de la Barre.
- 1900 – Borgia.
- 1902 Par le fer et par l'amour.
- 1903-1904 – La Fausta (First book in the Pardaillan series)
- 1904 – Le Matin (Second book in the Pardaillan series)
- 1906 – Le Capitan.
- 1907 – L’Âme de l’alchimiste (The Alchemist)
- 1909 – Nostradamus.
- 1909 – Le Pont des Soupirs ( Bridge of Sighs)
- 1909 – Les Amants de Venise (The Lovers of Venice)

== Adaptations ==
Several of his novels have been adapted for film and television.

- Il ponte dei sospiri (1921, dir. Domenico Gaido)
- Buridan, le héros de la tour de Nesle (1923, dir. Pierre Marodon)
- Triboulet (1923, dir. Febo Mari)
- Nostradamus (1937, dir. Juan Bustillo Oro and Antonio Helú)
- Il ponte dei sospiri (1940, dir. Mario Bonnard)
- Le Capitan (1946, dir. Robert Vernay)
- Buridan, héros de la Tour de Nesle (1952, dir. Émile Couzinet)
- Sul ponte dei sospiri (1953, dir. Antonio Leonviola)
- Le Capitan (1960, dir. André Hunebelle)
- Le Chevalier de Pardaillan (1962, dir. Bernard Borderie)
- Hardi Pardaillan! (1964, dir. Bernard Borderie)
- The Avenger of Venice (1964, dir. Carlo Campogalliani and Piero Pierotti)
