= The Count of Monte Cristo (1954 film) =

1954 film

- Directed by: Robert Vernay
- Written by: Georges Neveux; Robert Vernay
- Based on: The Count of Monte Cristo by Alexandre Dumas
- Produced by: Lucien Masson; Jacques Roitfeld
- Starring: Jean Marais; Lia Amanda; Roger Pigaut
- Cinematography: Robert Juillard
- Edited by: Monique Kirsanoff
- Music by: Jean Wiener
- Production companies: Fono Roma; La Société des Films Sirius; Les Productions Jacques Roitfeld; Lux Film
- Distributed by: La Société des Films Sirius; Lux Film
- Release dates: 14 January 1954 (France); 20 August 1954 (Italy)
- Running time: 183 minutes
- Countries: France; Italy
- Language: French
- Box office: 7,780,642 admissions (France)

The Count of Monte Cristo (French: Le Comte de Monte-Cristo) is a 1954 French-Italian historical drama film directed by Robert Vernay and starring Jean Marais, Lia Amanda and Roger Pigaut. It is based on the 1844 novel of the same title by Alexandre Dumas.

It was first aired in France and Italy, in 1954, in 2 parts.

France : 1) La Trahison, 2) La Vengeance

Italy : 1) Il tesoro di Montecristo, 2) La vendetta di Montecristo

It was shot at the Billancourt Studios in Paris and on location on the Côte d'Azur. The sets were designed by the art director Robert Clavel. It was made in Gevacolor.

== Cast ==
- Jean Marais as Edmond Dantès / Comte de Monte-Cristo
- Lia Amanda as Mercédès Herrera (1 and 2)
- Roger Pigaut as Fernand Mondego, alias : de Mortcerf, new husband of Mercédès (1 and 2)
- Cristina Grado as Haydée, la jeune esclave (2)
- Jacques Castelot as Gérard Noirtier, alias M. de Villefort, procureur du roi (1 and 2)
- Daniel Ivernel as Gaspard Caderousse, le second d'Edmond sur le bateau (1 and 2)
- Claude Génia as la Carconte, la femme de Caderousse (1)
- Jean Témerson as le roi Louis XVIII
- Louis Seigner as M. Joannès, le bijoutier Parisien (1)
- Noël Roquevert as M. Noirtier, le père de Gérard (1)
- Folco Lulli as Jacopo, le capitaine du bateau au large du château d'If (1 and 2)
- Paolo Stoppa as Bertuccio, l'ancien amant de La Picard (2)
- Julien Bertheau as Napoléon Ier (1)
- Lucien Blondeau as Dantès père (1)
- André Brunot as L'armateur Morel (1)
- Gualtiero Tumiati as L'abbé Faria (1)
- Simone Paris as Émilienne de Beaugency (2)
- Genica Athanasiou as Fatima (2)
- Daniel Cauchy as Bruno
- Jean-Pierre Mocky as Albert de Morcerf (2)
- Marcel Journet as Le président de la chambre des Pairs (2)
- Paul Azaïs as Un argousin
- Cristina Grado as Haydée

== Bibliography ==
- Roy Kinnard & Tony Crnkovich. Italian Sword and Sandal Films, 1908–1990. McFarland, 2017.
