= Be Beautiful But Shut Up =

1958 French comedy film by Marc Allégret

Be Beautiful and Shut Up
- Directed by: Marc Allégret
- Written by: Marc Allégret; William Benjamin adaptation Marc Allegret; Gabriel Arout; Odette Joyeux; Jean Marsan; Roger Vadim dialogue Jean Marsan
- Produced by: Raymond Eger
- Starring: Mylène Demongeot; Henri Vidal
- Cinematography: Armand Thirard
- Edited by: Suzanne de Troeye
- Music by: Jean Wiener
- Distributed by: Les Films Corona
- Release date: 1958
- Running time: 100 minutes
- Country: France
- Language: French
- Box office: $14.3 million

Be Beautiful and Shut Up (French: Sois belle et tais-toi) is a French black-and-white crime comedy film made in 1958, directed by Marc Allégret.

The film features Alain Delon and Jean Paul Belmondo in early roles as members of a gang.

It was also known as Blonde for Danger.

== Plot ==
The protagonist, played by Mylène Demongeot, is a teenage female orphan who after escaping from her detention center joins a gang of Parisian burglars, but then by coincidence meets a young police inspector (played by Henri Vidal) with whom she falls in love, marries and starts a decent life.

The story shows how her former acquaintances from the criminal milieu become suspects in a jewel robbery.

== Cast ==
- Mylène Demongeot as Virginie Dumayet
- Henri Vidal as Insp. Jean Morel
- Darry Cowl as Insp. Jérôme
- Béatrice Altariba as Olga Babitcheff
- Roger Hanin as Charlemagne
- Jean-Paul Belmondo as Pierrot
- Alain Delon as Loulou
- Robert Dalban as Insp. Gotterat
- François Darbon as Gino
- Gabrielle Fontan as Grand-mère de Jean
- René Lefèvre as Raphaël

== Production ==
Filming took place from December 1957 to February 1958.

== Reception ==
The film recorded admissions of 1,904,380 in France. This made it the 44th most popular film of the year.
