= Roger Ferdinand =

French playwright and screenwriter

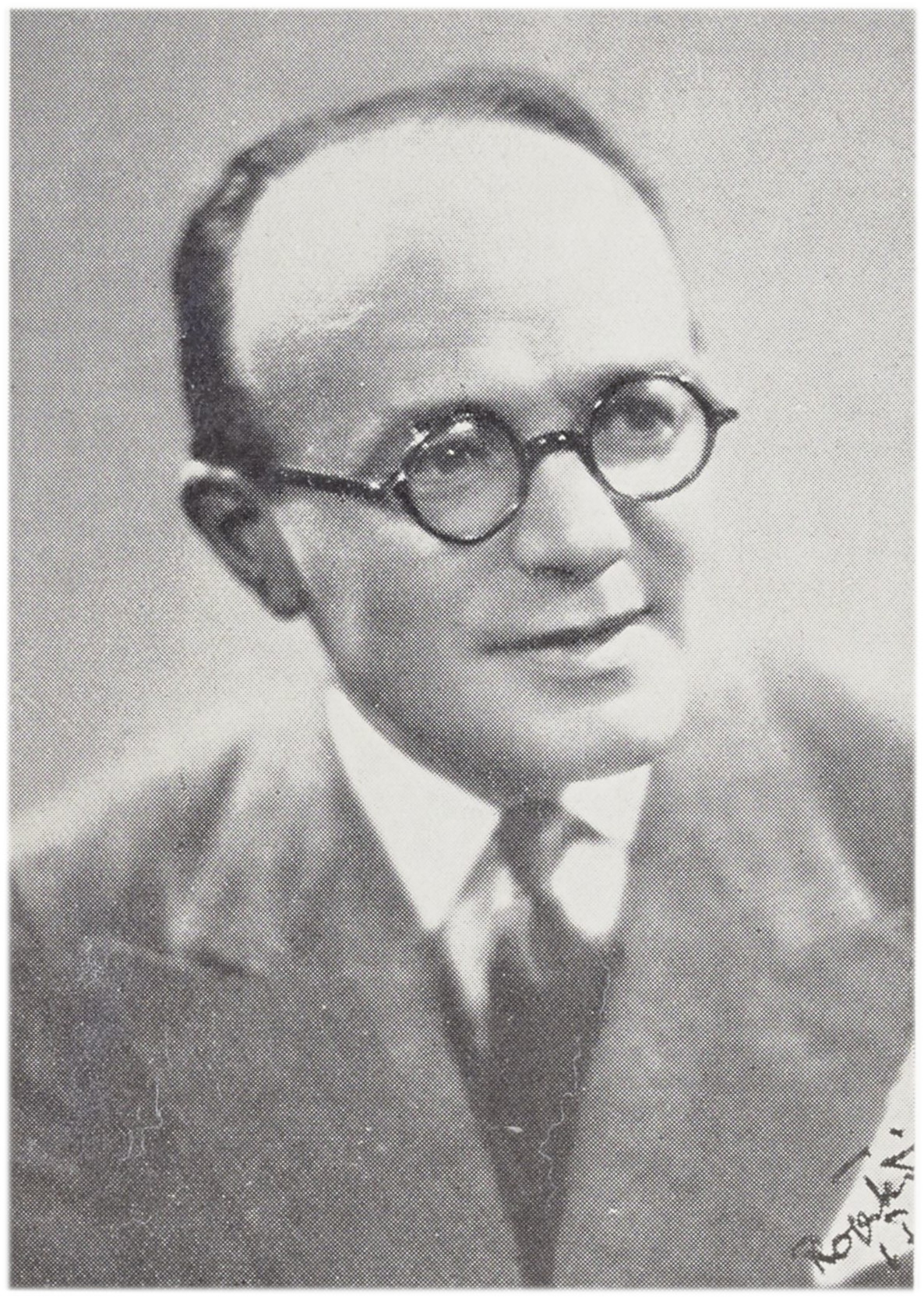
- Born: 8 October 1898; Saint-Lô, France
- Died: 31 December 1967 (aged 69); Palaiseau, France
- Occupation: Writer
- Years active: 1930-1967 (film )
- Spouse: Jeanne Huvet (1892-1975)

Roger Ferdinand (1898–1967) was a French playwright and screenwriter.

== Biography ==
Roger Ferdinand, whose full name was Roger Maurice Ferdinand, enjoyed great popular success in the late 1940s and throughout the 1950s with his play Les J3. Several of his plays have been adapted for the screen, and eight of them were performed on television in the program Au théâtre ce soir between 1966 and 1982. He was president of the Société des Auteurs et Compositeurs Dramatiques (SACD) from 1946 to 1955 before heading the National Conservatoire national supérieur d'art dramatique from 1955 to 1967.

He is buried in the cemetery of Saint-L. The municipal theater in Saint-Lô perpetuates his memory by bearing his name, as do a street and a school in Palaiseau.

== Selected filmography ==
- Levy and Company (1930)
- Chotard and Company (1933)
- A Man of Gold (1934)
- The Lady from Vittel (1937)
- The New Rich (1938)
- President Haudecoeur (1940)
- Mademoiselle Béatrice (1943)
- Distress (1946)
- They Are Twenty (1950)

== Bibliography ==
- Goble, Alan. The Complete Index to Literary Sources in Film. Walter de Gruyter, 1999.
