= Music in the Head =

1951 film

- Directed by: Georges Combret; Claude Orval
- Written by: Claude Boissol; Louis d'Yvré
- Produced by: Georges Combret
- Starring: Jacques Hélian; Jimmy Gaillard; Colette Deréal
- Cinematography: Pierre Petit
- Edited by: Germaine Fouquet
- Music by: Hubert Giraud
- Production company: Radius Productions
- Distributed by: Cocinor
- Release date: 1 November 1951
- Running time: 96 minutes
- Country: France
- Language: French

Music in the Head (French: Musique en tête) is a 1951 French musical comedy film directed by Georges Combret and Claude Orval and starring Jacques Hélian, Jimmy Gaillard and Colette Deréal. Location shooting took place around Béziers in Hérault. The film's sets were designed by the art director Robert Dumesnil.

== Synopsis ==
Mario is a big hit on the radio, but his real identity remains a secret as it is planned to unveil him in a major show. Jacques Hélian and his musicians all head to a remote village where they can lie low. Violette is devoted to the famous radio performer, and several of the musicians pretend to be the anonymous singer.

== Cast ==
- Jacques Hélian as Self
- Christiane Lénier as Violette
- Rudy Hirigoyen as Mario Stelli
- Irène de Trébert as Monique
- Jimmy Gaillard as Bob
- Colette Deréal as Gisèle
- Fransined as L'imprésario
- Marie-France as La petite fille
- Maryse Martin as La paysanne
- Georges Bever as Le jardinier
- Maximilienne as La directrice du personnel
- Jean Marco as Self
- Patoum as Self
- Pierre Brun as Self
- André Martin as Self

== Bibliography ==
- Bessy, Maurice & Chirat, Raymond. Histoire du cinéma français: 1951-1955. Pygmalion, 1989.
- Rège, Philippe. Encyclopedia of French Film Directors, Volume 1. Scarecrow Press, 2009.
