= Rendez-vous avec Maurice Chevalier n°1 =

- Directed by: Maurice Régamey
- Starring: Maurice Chevalier; Jerry Mengo; Martine Carol; Christian-Jaque; Eddie Constantine
- Cinematography: Willy Faktorovitch; Jean Lehérissey
- Release date: 1957
- Running time: 27 minutes
- Country: France
- Language: French

Rendez-vous avec Maurice Chevalier n°1 is a French short film directed by Maurice Régamey in 1957.

== Synopsis ==
Maurice Chevalier visits several artists to discuss their work.

== Songs ==
- Pour les Amants c'est tous les Jours (1947)
  - Music by Georges Van Parys
  - Lyrics by René Clair
  - Performed by Maurice Chevalier
- Et Bailler et Dormir (1953)
  - Music by Jeff Davis
  - Lyrics by Charles Aznavour
  - Performed by Eddie Constantine
- Ah ! Les Femmes (1953)
  - Music by Jeff Davis
  - Lyrics by Pierre Saka
  - Performed by Eddie Constantine
- Chapeau de Paille (1954)
  - Music by Henri Betti
  - Lyrics by Albert Willemetz
  - Performed by Maurice Chevalier
