= The Woman from the End of the World =

1938 film directed by Jean Epstein

- Directed by: Jean Epstein
- Written by: Jean Epstein
- Based on: The Woman from the End of the World by Alain Serdac
- Produced by: Gilbert Renault-Decker
- Starring: Charles Vanel; Jean-Pierre Aumont; Germaine Rouer
- Cinematography: Joseph Braun; Paul Cotteret; Enzo Riccioni
- Edited by: Henriette Caire
- Music by: Jean Wiener
- Production company: Films Renault-Decker
- Distributed by: Société de Films Osso
- Release date: 19 January 1938
- Running time: 87 minutes
- Country: France
- Language: French

The Woman from the End of the World (French: La femme du bout du monde) is a 1938 French drama film directed by Jean Epstein and starring Charles Vanel, Jean-Pierre Aumont and Germaine Rouer. It is based on a novel of the same title by Alain Serdac. Location shooting took place on the island of Ushant off Brittany. The film's sets were designed by the art director Roger Berteaux.

== Cast ==
- Charles Vanel as Durc, l'officier mécanicien
- Jean-Pierre Aumont as Lt. Robert Jacquet
- Germaine Rouer as Anna
- Alexandre Rignault as Bourrhis, le maître d'équipage
- Philippe Richard as Capt. Sueur
- Andrée Servilanges as Andrée
- Edmond Beauchamp as Charley
- Georges Douking as Planque
- Jacky Vilmont as Jimmy
- Robert Le Vigan as Arlanger, l'armateur
- Paul Azaïs as Radio Molinier

== Bibliography ==
- Bessy, Maurice & Chirat, Raymond. Histoire du cinéma français: 1935–1939. Pygmalion, 1986.
- Crisp, Colin. Genre, Myth and Convention in the French Cinema, 1929–1939. Indiana University Press, 2002.
- Oscherwitz, Dayna & Higgins, MaryEllen. The A to Z of French Cinema. Scarecrow Press, 2009.
- Rège, Philippe. Encyclopedia of French Film Directors, Volume 1. Scarecrow Press, 2009.
