= Héléna Manson =

French actress (1898–1994)

- Born: Elena Eugenia Manson; 18 August 1898; Caracas, Venezuela
- Died: 15 September 1994 (aged 96); Neuilly-sur-Seine, France
- Occupation: Actress
- Years active: 1925-1989

Elena Eugenia Manson (18 August 1898 – 15 September 1994) was a French film actress. She appeared in more than 100 films between 1925 and 1989.

== Selected filmography ==
- The Vocation of André Carel (1925) – L'amoureuse de Cardan
- The Mystery of the Villa Rose (1930) – Hélène Vauquier
- The Brothers Karamazov (1931) – Fénia
- The Indictment (1931) – Annette Evans
- Monsieur the Duke (1931) – La secrétaire
- Kameradschaft (1931) – Rose, la femme du mineur blessé
- Narcotics (1932) – L'infirmière (uncredited)
- The Case of Doctor Brenner (1933) – L'infirmière
- Madame Bovary (1934) – Héloïse Bovary
- Fedora (1934)– La femme de chambre
- Coralie and Company (1934) – L'infirmière
- A Train in the Night (1934) – La folle
- Pension Mimosas (1935) – La petite rentière
- Helene (1936) – Valérie
- In Venice, One Night (1937) – Julie
- Rail Pirates (1938) – Madame Teysseire
- Bar du sud (1938)
- Ultima giovinezza (1939) – Maria
- Second Childhood (1939) – Marie
- L'empreinte du Dieu (1940) – La soeur de Karelina
- Who Killed Santa Claus? (1941) – Marie Coquillot
- The Strangers in the House (1942) – Madame Manu
- The Newspaper Falls at Five O'Clock (1942) – Marie Le Goard
- The Benefactor (1942) – Gertrude, la bonne
- Picpus (1943) – Marie, la bonne (uncredited)
- Marie-Martine (1943) – Madame Limousin
- The Stairs Without End (1943) – Mademoiselle Michaud
- Le Corbeau (1943) – Marie Corbin – l'infirmière
- The Man from London (1943) – Julie Malouin
- Mermoz (1943) – Madame Mermoz
- The Eternal Husband (1946) – La mère de Mathias le hussard
- Her Final Role (1946)
- The Murderer is Not Guilty (1946) – Anne-Marie Mahé
- Nuit sans fin (1947) – La fille Leleuf
- Manon (1949) – La commère (une paysanne normande)
- The Wolf (1949) – Alphonsine
- Return to Life (1949) – Simone (segment 1 : "Le retour de tante Emma")
- The Farm of Seven Sins (1949) – Michèle Frémont dite La Michel
- Farewell Mister Grock (1950) – Tante Pauline
- The Ferret (1950) – Elise Bonvallet
- Born of Unknown Father (1950) – Mme Denis
- Adventures of Captain Fabian (1951) – Josephine
- Two Pennies Worth of Violets (1951) – Jeanne Desforges
- Le Plaisir (1952) – Marie Rivet (segment "La Maison Tellier")
- Stranger on the Prowl (1952) – Grocery Store Clerk (victim)
- A Mother's Secret (1952)
- The Other Side of Paradise (1953) – Mme Roumégoux
- Children of Love (1953) – Mlle Lefort
- The Lost Girl (1954)
- Service Entrance (1954) – Madame Delecluze
- Master of Life and Death (1955) – Louise Kerbrec
- Black Dossier (1955) – Mme. Limousin – la femme du procureur
- Lola Montès (1955) – Lieutenant James' Sister
- People of No Importance (1956) – Germaine Constantin dite Mme Germaine
- Goubbiah, mon amour (1956) – Goubbiah's Aunt
- Paris Palace Hotel (1956) – Petit rôle (uncredited)
- Les lumières du soir (1956) – Une demandeuse d'emploi
- I'll Get Back to Kandara (1956)
- The Vintage (1957) – Eugénie (uncredited)
- Bonjour jeunesse (1957) – La cousine
- An Eye for an Eye (1957) – Mme Laurier
- Les Truands (1957) – Nana Benoît aîné
- Un homme se penche sur son passé (1958) – Madame Le Floch
- Toi, le venin (1958) – Amélie
- Women Are Weak (1959) – Mother Superior
- The Big Chief (1959) – La guide polyglotte au Louvre
- The President (1961) – Madame Taupin (uncredited)
- Famous Love Affairs (1961) – La duchesse (segment "Comédiennes, Les")
- The Burning Court (1962) – Augusta Henderson – Housekeeper
- Two Are Guilty (1963) – Une dame du jury
- Trap for Cinderella (1965) – L'infirmière
- Paris in August (1966) – Mme Pampine, la concierge
- Peace in the Fields (1970) – Johanna
- Macédoine (1971) – La chef d'atelier
- The Tenant (1976) – Head Nurse
- Les Misérables (1982) – La logeuse de la maison Corbeau
- La femme ivoire (1984) – Mlle Berthe
- Agent trouble (1987) – Madame Sackman, la directrice du musée
- Les Maris, les Femmes, les Amants (1989) – Mère dentiste
