= The Sea Rose =

1946 film

- Directed by: Jacques de Baroncelli
- Written by: Paul Vialar (novel); Marc-Gilbert Sauvajon
- Produced by: Lucien Masson
- Starring: Denise Bosc; Fernand Ledoux; Roger Pigaut
- Cinematography: Jean Isnard
- Edited by: Marguerite Renoir
- Music by: Louiguy
- Production company: La Société des Films Sirius
- Distributed by: La Société des Films Sirius
- Release date: 11 September 1946
- Running time: 85 minutes
- Country: France
- Language: French

The Sea Rose (French: La rose de la mer) is a 1946 French drama film directed by Jacques de Baroncelli and starring Denise Bosc, Fernand Ledoux and Roger Pigaut. The film's sets were designed by the art director Paul-Louis Boutié.

== Synopsis ==
Jérôme his uncle Romain own an old cargo ship. When he discovers that Romain and his dishonest crew plan to scuttle the ship for insurance money he attempts to prevent them.

== Cast ==
- Denise Bosc as Jeannette
- Fernand Ledoux as Romain Jardehu
- Roger Pigaut as Jérôme
- Lily Baron as Louise
- Noël Roquevert as La Galoche
- Pierre Palau as Sidobre
- Georges Lannes as Monsieur Pierre
- Jane Maguenat as Madame Néel
- René Génin as Néel
- Georges Tourreil as Mouchel
- Roger Bontemps as Le marin du bistrot
- François Patrice as Le mousse
- Albert Michel as Un mécanicien
- Edmond Beauchamp as Un mécanicien
- Delacour
- Yves Massard
- Véra Norman
- André Wasley

== Bibliography ==
- Goble, Alan. The Complete Index to Literary Sources in Film. Walter de Gruyter, 1999.
