= The Wolf (1949 film) =

- Directed by: Guillaume Radot
- Written by: Yves Brainville; Guillaume Radot
- Produced by: Guillaume Radot
- Starring: Claude Génia; Jean Davy; Renaud Mary
- Cinematography: Paul Cotteret
- Edited by: Pierre Caillet
- Music by: Maurice Thiriet
- Production company: Union Générale Cinématographique
- Distributed by: Alliance Générale de Distribution Cinématographique
- Release date: 13 July 1949
- Running time: 90 minutes
- Country: France
- Language: French

The Wolf (French: La louve) is a 1949 French drama film directed by Guillaume Radot and starring Claude Génia, Jean Davy and Renaud Mary. The film's sets were designed by the art director Marcel Magniez.

== Cast ==
- Claude Génia as Henriette
- Jean Davy as Saint-Ricquier
- Renaud Mary as Rémi
- Héléna Bossis as Marie
- Michel Barbey as Le frère de Marie
- Georges Bever as Signol
- Yves Brainville as Le docteur Maillet
- Jean Carmet as Gustave
- Jacky Flynt as Pulchérie
- Héléna Manson as Alphonsine
- Maya as Madame Bontemps
- Palau as Dermont

== Bibliography ==
- Christian Gilles. Le cinéma des années quarante par ceux qui l'ont fait. Harmattan, 2000.
