= Jean Gourguet =

French film director, screenwriter and film producer

- Born: 5 December 1902; Sète (Hérault)
- Died: 13 March 1994 (aged 91); Paris
- Occupations: Film director, screenwriter, film producer
- Years active: 1928 - 1961

Jean Gourguet (5 December 1902 – 13 March 1994) was a French film director, screenwriter and film producer.

== Filmography ==
=== Director ===
- 1928 : Rayon de soleil
- 1929 : L'Escale
- 1934 : The Coquelet Affair
- 1938 : Jeannette Bourgogne
- 1942 : Le Moussaillon
- 1943 : Malaria
- 1946 : Her Final Role
- 1949 : Les Orphelins de Saint-Vaast
- 1950 : Zone frontière
- 1951 : Trafic sur les dunes
- 1952 : A Mother's Secret
- 1952 : Une enfant dans la tourmente
- 1953 : Maternité clandestine
- 1954 : The Lost Girl
- 1955 : La Cage aux souris
- 1955 : Les Premiers Outrages
- 1956 : Les Promesses dangereuses
- 1957 : Isabelle Is Afraid of Men
- 1958 : La P... sentimentale
- 1960 : Les Frangines
- 1961 : La Traversée de la Loire
