= Jean-François d'Orgeix =

French equestrian

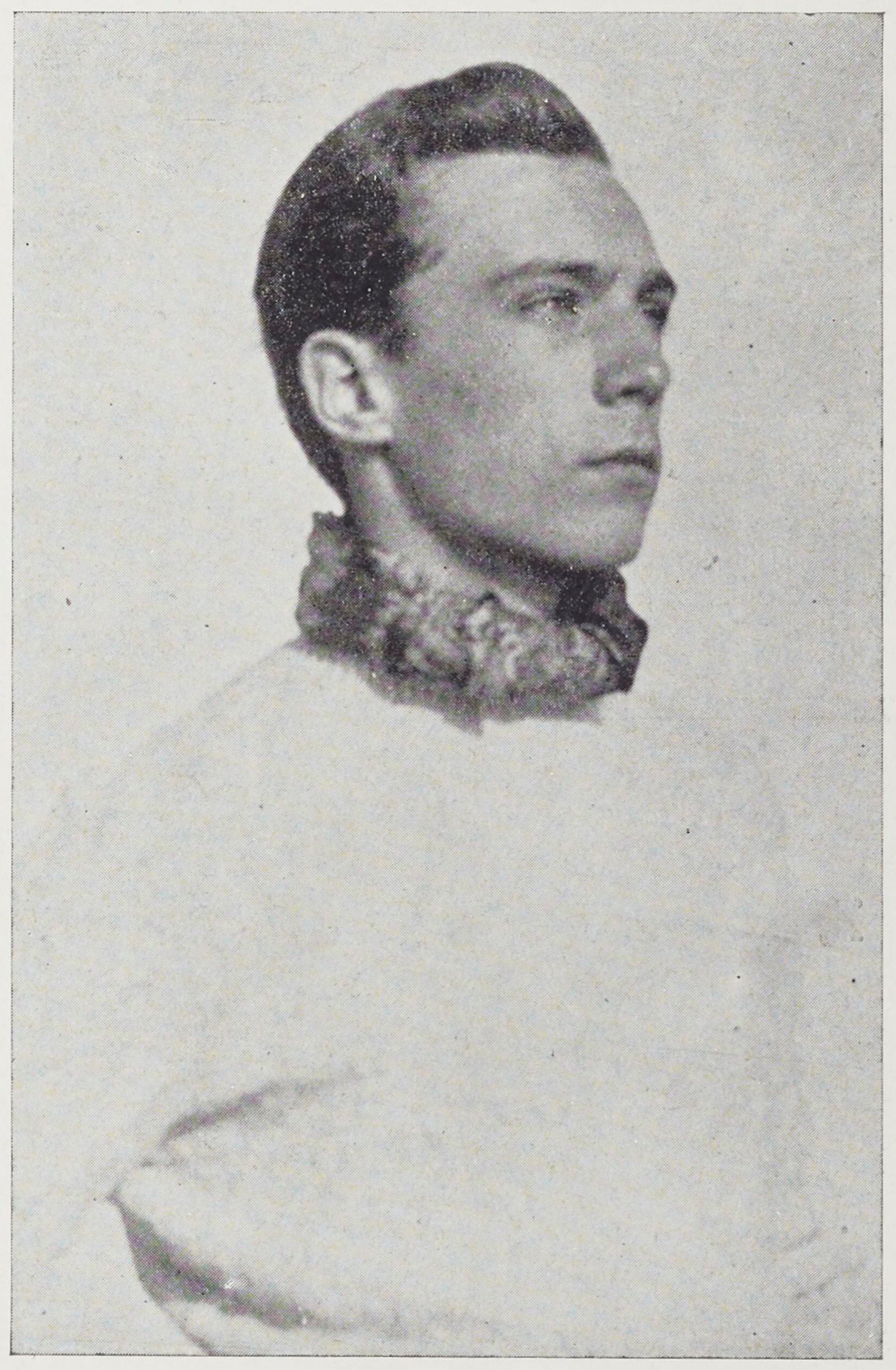
- Jean Pâqui, alias Jean d'Orgeix

Personal information
- Nationality: French
- Born: Jean-François-Marie-Henri de Thonel; 15 April 1921 Cap-d'Ail, France
- Died: 4 July 2006 (aged 85) Toucy, France

Sport
- Country: France
- Sport: Horse riding
Medal record
Equestrian
Representing France
Olympic Games
| Bronze medal – third place | 1948 London | Show jumping |

Jean-François d'Orgeix (French pronunciation: [ʒɑ̃ fʁɑ̃swa dɔʁʒɛks]; 15 April 1921 – 4 July 2006) was a French equestrian, actor and Olympic medalist. He was born in Cap-d'Ail. He competed in show jumping at the 1948 Summer Olympics in London, where he won a bronze medal in the individual contest. He also competed in show jumping at the 1952 Summer Olympics in Helsinki and placed fifth with the French team.

Under the name of Jean Pâqui he appeared in more than twenty films between 1933 and 1958.

== Selected filmography ==
- The House of Mystery (1933)
- Beethoven's Great Love (1937)
- Mother Love (1938)
- The Mayor's Dilemma (1939)
- Business Is Business (1942)
- Girl with Grey Eyes (1945)
- The Captain (1946)
- Vendetta in Camargue (1950)
- Dakota 308 (1951)
- A Caprice of Darling Caroline (1953)
- The Beautiful Otero (1954)
- Serenade of Texas (1958)
