= First on the Rope =

1944 film

- Directed by: Louis Daquin
- Written by: Alexandre Arnoux; Louis Daquin; Jacqueline Jacoupy; Paul Leclercq
- Based on: First on the Rope by Roger Frison-Roche
- Produced by: Jacqueline Jacoupy
- Starring: Irène Corday; André Le Gall; Lucien Blondeau
- Cinematography: Philippe Agostini
- Edited by: Suzanne de Troeye
- Music by: Henri Sauguet
- Production company: Pathé Consortium Cinéma
- Distributed by: Pathé Consortium Cinéma
- Release date: 23 February 1944
- Running time: 106 minutes
- Country: France
- Language: French

First on the Rope (French: Premier de cordée) is a 1944 French drama film directed by Louis Daquin and starring Irène Corday, André Le Gall and Lucien Blondeau. It is an adaptation of the 1941 novel of the same title by Roger Frison-Roche. It was a faithful adaptation of the novel, which began shooting in June 1943 during the German Occupation of France. Despite being directed by Daquin, a French Communist, it was considered to demonstrate a Pétainist ideology possibly even containing elements of Nazism.

The film's sets were designed by the art director Lucien Aguettand. Location shooting took place around Mont Blanc in the French Alps.

== Synopsis ==
The son of a veteran mountain climber succeeds his father as "the first on the rope", leading expeditions into the mountains. However, after nearly losing his life during a climb he develops vertigo and abandons his position to take over as a hotel manager. Two years later when his father is persuaded by a Norwegian tourist to take him on a trip into the mountains, his son is forced to come to their rescue when they run into a trouble during a storm.

== Cast ==
- Irène Corday as Aline Lourtier
- André Le Gall as Pierre Servettaz
- Lucien Blondeau as Jean Servettaz
- Marcel Delaître as Ravanat dit 'Le Rouge'
- Jean Davy as Hubert de Vallon
- Maurice Baquet as Boule
- Mona Dol as Marie Servettaz
- Yves Furet as Georges à la Clarisse
- Andrée Clément as Suzanne Servettaz
- Geymond Vital as Maxime Vouillaz
- Tosca De Lac as L'acrobate
- Louis Seigner as Le docteur
- Roger Blin as Paul Moury
- Eugène Chevalier as Un guide
- Guy Decomble as Warfield
- Jacques Dufilho as Fernand Lourtier
- Fernand René as Napoléon
- Albert Duvaleix as L'oncle Dechosalet
- Jérôme Goulven as Un guide
- Jean-Marc Thibault as Un pensionnaire des Servettaz

== Bibliography ==
- Crisp, Colin. French Cinema—A Critical Filmography: Volume 2, 1940–1958. Indiana University Press, 2015.
- Nord, Philip. France's New Deal: From the Thirties to the Postwar Era. Princeton University Press, 2012.
