= Thirst of Men =

- Directed by: Serge de Poligny
- Written by: Jean Jeannin; Suzanne Pairault (novel); Bernard Zimmer; Serge de Poligny
- Produced by: Pierre Gérin
- Starring: Georges Marchal; Dany Robin; Andrée Clément
- Cinematography: Marcel Weiss
- Edited by: Jacques Grassi
- Music by: Paul Misraki
- Production company: Ciné Sélection
- Release date: 31 March 1950
- Running time: 93 minutes
- Country: France
- Language: French

Thirst of Men (French: La soif des hommes) is a 1950 French historical drama film directed by Serge de Poligny and starring Georges Marchal, Dany Robin and Andrée Clément. It was filmed and set in French Algeria.

The film's sets were designed by Raymond Gabutti and René Moulaert.

== Cast ==
- Georges Marchal as Le sergent Léon Bouvard
- Dany Robin as Julie
- Andrée Clément as Alice
- Paul Faivre as Broussol
- Jean Vilar as Le typographe
- Louis Arbessier as Collet
- Pierre Asso as Le Toulonnais
- Jean-Henri Chambois
- Marius David
- Mohamed Fatmi
- Jérôme Goulven
- Olivier Hussenot
- Heddy Miller
- Pierre Moncorbier as Le Savoyard
- Geneviève Morel as La Savoyarde
- Huguette Métayer
- Henri San Juan
- Pierre Sergeol
- Christiane Sertilange as Adèle

== Bibliography ==
- James Monaco. The Encyclopedia of Film. Perigee Books, 1991.
