= Pierre O'Connell =

French film producer

- Born: 1900
- Died: April 1973 (aged 72–73); Paris, France
- Occupation: Producer
- Years active: 1931–1961 (film)

Pierre O'Connell (1900–1973) was a French film producer.

== Selected filmography ==
- The Prosecutor Hallers (1930)
- La Route imperial (1935)
- The Cat in the Bag (1935)
- The Czar's Courier (1936)
- Port Arthur (1936)
- Behind the Façade (1939)
- They Were Twelve Women (1940)
- The Woman I Loved Most (1942)
- Father Goriot (1945)
- Patrie (1946)
- Panic (1947)
- The Sinners (1949)
- Marianne of My Youth (1955)
- Mademoiselle and Her Gang (1957)

== Bibliography ==
- Phillips, Alastair. City of Darkness, City of Light: Émigré Filmmakers in Paris, 1929-1939. Amsterdam University Press, 2004.
