= The Man from London (1943 film) =

- Directed by: Henri Decoin
- Written by: Charles Exbrayat; Henri Decoin
- Based on: The Man from London by Georges Simenon
- Produced by: François Chavane
- Starring: Fernand Ledoux; Suzy Prim; Jules Berry
- Cinematography: Paul Cotteret
- Edited by: Suzanne de Troeye
- Music by: Georges Van Parys; Marcel Landowski
- Production company: S.P.D.F.
- Distributed by: Éclair-Journal
- Release date: 20 October 1943
- Running time: 98 minutes
- Country: France
- Language: French

The Man from London or The London Man (French: L'homme de Londres) is a 1943 French thriller film directed by Henri Decoin and starring Fernand Ledoux, Suzy Prim and Jules Berry. It is an adaptation of the novel of the same title by the Belgian writer Georges Simenon, which was later turned into the 1947 British film Temptation Harbour. It was shot at the Buttes-Chaumont Studios in Paris. The film's sets were designed by the art director Serge Piménoff.

== Synopsis ==
A railway worker at a ferry port discovers a suitcase containing a large sum of money, the proceeds of a crime recently committed in London. He chooses to keep it rather than turn it over to the police, but it ends up luring him into a downwards spiral that eventually ends in murder.

== Cast ==
- Fernand Ledoux as Maloin
- Suzy Prim as Camélia
- Jules Berry as Brown
- Mony Dalmès as Henriette Maloin
- Blanche Montel as Madame Brown
- René Génin as Maënnec
- Made Siamé as La patronne
- Marcelle Monthil as Rose
- René Bergeron as Auguste
- Gaston Modot as Teddy
- Alexandre Rignault as Keridan
- Jean Brochard as L'inspecteur Mollison
- Héléna Manson as Julie Malouin

== See also ==
- Temptation Harbour (1947)
- The Man from London (2007)

== Bibliography ==
- Goble, Alan. The Complete Index to Literary Sources in Film. Walter de Gruyter, 1999.
