= The Farm of Seven Sins =

- Directed by: Jean Devaivre
- Written by: Janine Grégoire; Jean-Devaivre; René Méjean
- Produced by: Jean-Devaivre
- Starring: Jacques Dumesnil; Claude Génia; Aimé Clariond
- Cinematography: Lucien Joulin
- Edited by: Louis Devaivre
- Music by: Joseph Kosma
- Production company: Neptune Films
- Distributed by: La Société des Films Sirius
- Release date: 16 September 1949
- Running time: 90 minutes
- Country: France
- Language: French

The Farm of Seven Sins (French: La Ferme des sept péchés) is a 1949 French historical drama film directed by Jean Devaivre and starring Jacques Dumesnil, Claude Génia and Aimé Clariond.

The film's sets were designed by the art director Robert Hubert.

== Synopsis ==
During the 1820s, a notorious opponent of France's Bourbon Restoration is murdered in his country house. The authorities investigate whether it was his friends or enemies who killed him.

== Awards ==
The film won the Golden Leopard award at the 1949 Locarno International Film Festival

== Cast ==
- Jacques Dumesnil as Paul-Louis Courier
- Claude Génia as Herminie
- Aimé Clariond as Le marquis de Siblas
- Pierre Renoir as Le procureur Edmond de Chancey
- Alfred Adam as Symphorien Dubois
- Georges Grey as Pierre Dubois
- Palau as Le juge d'instruction / Examining judge
- Arthur Devère as Frémont
- Héléna Manson as Michèle Frémont dite La Michel
- Jacques Dufilho as François Sovignant
- René Génin as Le maire d'Azay
- Jean Vilar as L'homme gris / Grey man
- Georges Bever as Le maire de Luynes
- Jean Marchan as Guillaume
- Albert Broquin as Un paysan
- Harry-Max
- Julien Maffre as Un paysan
- Albert Malbert as Un paysan
- Henri Niel as L'aubergiste
- Marcel Pérès as Coupeau

== Bibliography ==
- Crisp, Colin. French Cinema—A Critical Filmography: Volume 2, 1940-1958. Indiana University Press, 2015.
