= Simone Paris =

French actress (1909–1985)

- Born: 10 September 1909; Paris, France
- Died: 17 December 1985 (aged 76); Mantes-la-Jolie, France
- Other name: Simone Marie-Thérèse Maderon
- Occupation: Actress
- Years active: 1936-1980 (film)

Simone Paris (1909–1985) was a French stage and film actress.

== Selected filmography ==
- Nine Bachelors (1939)
- The Italian Straw Hat (1941)
- The Martyr of Bougival (1949)
- Minne (1950)
- Gigolo (1951)
- Je l'ai été trois fois (1952)
- Run Away Mr. Perle (1952)
- The Moment of Truth (1952)
- The Count of Monte Cristo (1954)
- Au diable la vertu (1954)
- Yours Truly, Blake (1954)
- The Air of Paris (1954)
- The Affair of the Poisons (1955)
- Napoleon (1955)
- Fruits of Summer (1955)
- Cela s'appelle l'aurore (1956)
- Don Juan (1956)
- Bob le Flambeur (1956)
- Mademoiselle Strip-tease (1957)
- Sénéchal the Magnificent (1957)
- Isabelle Is Afraid of Men (1957)
- Mon pote le gitan (1959)
- Love and the Frenchwoman (1960)
- Love at Sea (1965)
- A Man and a Woman (1966)
- Hail the Artist (1973)

== Bibliography ==
- Edward Baron Turk. Child of Paradise: Marcel Carné and the Golden Age of French Cinema. Harvard University Press, 1989.
