= Clodoche =

1938 film

- Directed by: Raymond Lamy; Claude Orval
- Written by: Antoine de Rochefort
- Produced by: Antoine de Rochefort; Gilbert Walter
- Starring: Pierre Larquey; Denise Bosc; Jules Berry
- Cinematography: René Colas; Paul Portier
- Edited by: Pierre Lebon
- Music by: Michel-Maurice Levy
- Production company: Les Films RW
- Distributed by: Compagnie Parisienne de Location de Films
- Release date: 20 July 1938
- Running time: 90 minutes
- Country: France
- Language: French

Clodoche is a 1938 French comedy film directed by Raymond Lamy and Claude Orval and starring Pierre Larquey, Denise Bosc, Jules Berry and Florelle. The film's sets were designed by the art director Roland Quignon.

== Cast ==
- Pierre Larquey as Clodoche
- Denise Bosc as Dolly
- Jules Berry as Le Prince Berky
- Florelle as Irène
- Paul Demange as Pétardy
- Robert Desclos as un clochard
- Jean Dunot as La Fouine
- Jean Fleur as Embauche
- Raymond Galle as Michel
- Toto Grassin as le champion cycliste
- Jane Loury as La mère
- Paul Marthès as Bombasset
- Maximilienne as La vieille fille
- Alexandre Mihalesco as L'usurier
- Pierre Stéphen as Jacques
- Marie-Jacqueline Chantal
- Robert Seller

== Bibliography ==
- Bessy, Maurice & Chirat, Raymond. Histoire du cinéma français: 1935-1939. Pygmalion, 1986.
- Crisp, Colin. Genre, Myth and Convention in the French Cinema, 1929-1939. Indiana University Press, 2002.
- Rège, Philippe. Encyclopedia of French Film Directors, Volume 1. Scarecrow Press, 2009.
