= Captain Blood (1960 film) =

1960 film

- Theatrical release poster
- Directed by: André Hunebelle
- Screenplay by: Franco Foucard; Jean Halain; André Hunebelle
- Based on: Le Capitan; 1907 novel by Michel Zevaco
- Produced by: René Bezard; Pierre Cabaud
- Starring: Jean Marais; Bourvil; Elsa Martinelli; Lise Delamare
- Cinematography: Marcel Grignon
- Edited by: Jean Feyte
- Music by: Jean Marion
- Distributed by: Pathé Consortium Cinéma
- Release dates: 5 October 1960 (France); 24 November 1960 (Italy)
- Running time: 111 minutes
- Countries: France; Italy
- Languages: French; Italian

Captain Blood (French: Le capitan, lit. 'The Captain'; Italian: Il capitano del re, lit. 'The King's Captain') is a 1960 French–Italian swashbuckler film directed by André Hunebelle and starring Jean Marais, Bourvil, Elsa Martinelli and Lise Delamare. It is based on a novel by Michel Zévaco.

The film has no relation to the American film Captain Blood (1935).

== Plot ==
The story unfolds in France in the early 17th century, with Louis XIII just coming of age while his mother, Marie de' Medici, continues to rule with her favorite, Concino Concini, who is the prime minister. Concini, aided by his ambitious wife Leonora Dori, seeks to consolidate power through any means necessary, even resorting to crime and treason. He spreads terror across the land, particularly in the southwestern provinces, orchestrating attacks to weaken the nobility.

However, high-ranking lords conspire to overthrow Concini and place the Duke Charles of Angoulême, who is excluded from the regular royal succession, on the throne. Among these nobles is François de Capestang, a brave knight determined to fight for justice and protect his king's crown, as well as the life of Gisèle d'Angoulême, whom he owes a debt of gratitude for saving him in battle.

The narrative follows François as he sets out for Paris to present his province's grievances to the king. Along the way, he encounters various challenges and allies, including Cogolin, a street performer turned confidant. In Paris, François confronts Concini but refuses to join his corrupt schemes, instead opting to serve as a spy to gather crucial information.

With Cogolin's infiltration into the royal court, François learns of Gisèle's whereabouts and embarks on a mission to rescue her from captivity. In the midst of his efforts, François also saves the king from an assassination attempt, earning Louis XIII's trust and support.

As the conflict intensifies, betrayals and alliances shape the course of events. Béatrice de Beaufort, initially aligned with Concini, switches sides after the death of her father, warning François and the conspirators of impending danger. In a climactic battle at Saint-Leu castle, François and his allies face off against Concini's forces, ultimately emerging victorious with the timely arrival of King Louis XIII.

The story concludes with reconciliation between the warring factions, symbolized by François's impending marriage to Gisèle and Cogolin's opportunity to declare his love. Louis XIII declares his reign with the demise of Concini, ushering in a new era of unity and stability for the kingdom.

== Cast ==
- Jean Marais as François de Capestan
- Bourvil as Cogolin
- Elsa Martinelli as Gisèle d'Angoulême
- Arnoldo Foà as Concino Concini
- Pierrette Bruno as Giuseppa
- Lise Delamare as Marie de Médicis
- Annie Anderson as Béatrice de Beaufort
- Guy Delorme as Rinaldo
- Christian Fourcade as Louis XIII
- Jacqueline Porel as Léonora Galigaï
- Jean-Paul Coquelin as Vitry
- Raphaël Patorni as Le duc d'Angoulême
- Robert Porte as Duc de Rohan
- Jean Berger as Luynes
- Piéral as Lorenzo
- Paul Préboist as A thief

== Release ==
Captain Blood was released theatrically in France on 5 October 1960. It was released in Italy on 24 November 1960.

== See also ==
- The Captain (1946)
