= Claude Génia =

French actress

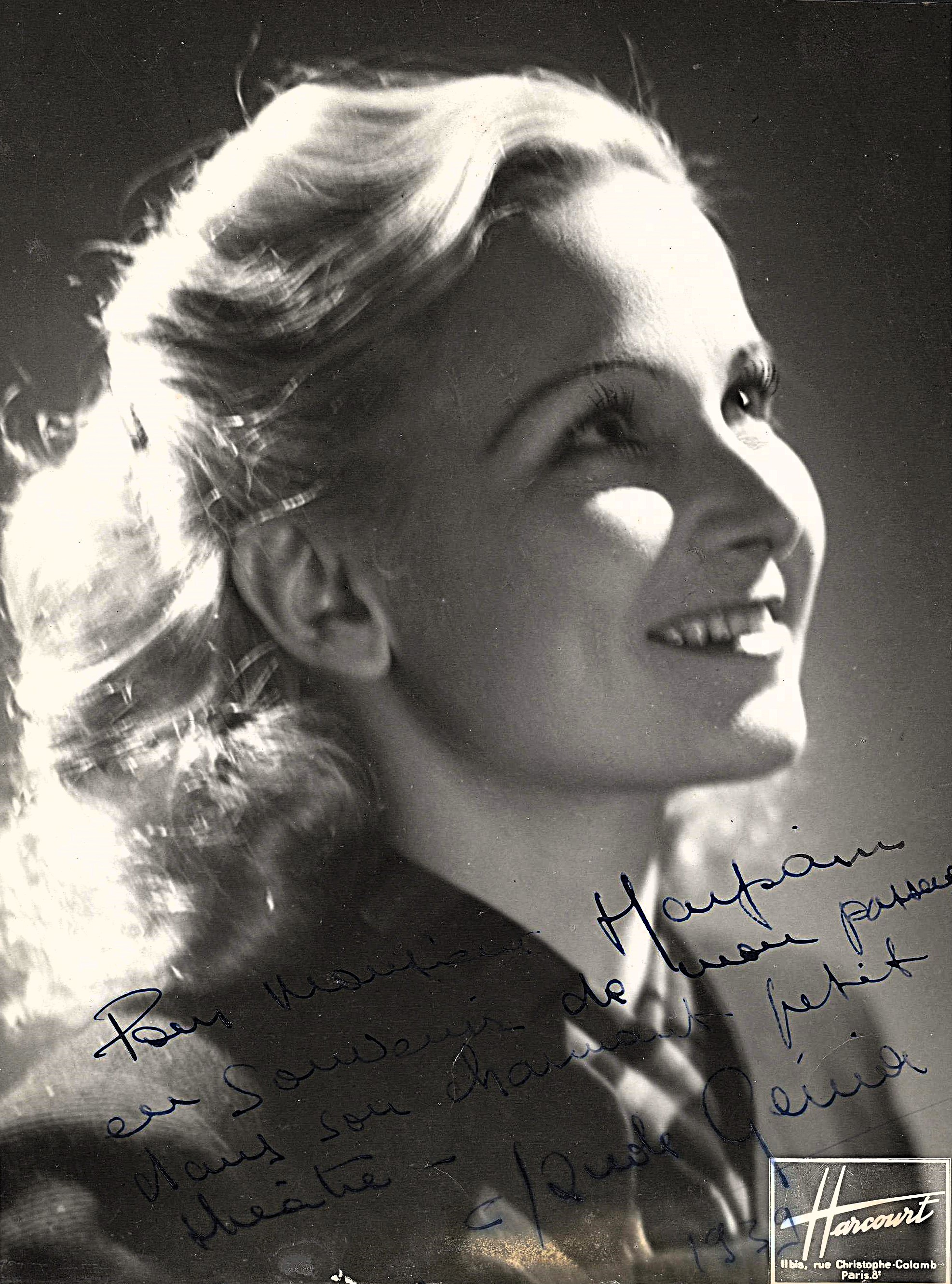
- Born: 4 March 1913; Vetluga, Russian Empire
- Died: 18 May 1979 (aged 66); Tours, Indre-et-Loire, France
- Occupation: Actress
- Years active: 1943–1979 (film & TV)

Claude Génia (1913–1979) was a Russian-born French stage and film actress. She also appeared in television productions later in her career.

== Selected filmography ==
- The Honourable Catherine (1943)
- Girl with Grey Eyes (1945)
- Father Goriot (1945)
- The Captain (1946)
- The Wolf (1949)
- The Farm of Seven Sins (1949)
- The Count of Monte Cristo (1954)
- Repeated Absences (1972)

== Bibliography ==
- Goble, Alan. The Complete Index to Literary Sources in Film. Walter de Gruyter, 1999.
