= Georges Bever =

French actor (1884–1973)

- Born: Georges Maurice Van Bever; 22 September 1884; Paris, France
- Died: 14 January 1973 (aged 88); Paris, France
- Occupation: Actor
- Years active: 1927–1973 (film)

Georges Bever (1884–1973) was a French film and television actor.

== Selected filmography ==
- The Crystal Submarine (1927)
- Chérie (1930)
- The Man in Evening Clothes (1931)
- I'll Be Alone After Midnight (1931)
- When Do You Commit Suicide? (1931)
- Fun in the Barracks (1932)
- Monsieur Albert (1932)
- His Best Client (1932)
- Aces of the Turf (1932)
- The Invisible Woman (1933)
- The Midnight Prince (1934)
- Paris-Deauville (1934)
- Mam'zelle Spahi (1934)
- The Darling of His Concierge (1934)
- Merchant of Love (1935)
- The Bureaucrats (1936)
- Adventure in Paris (1936)
- A Hen on a Wall (1936)
- Ménilmontant (1936)
- Mercadet (1936)
- Excursion Train (1936)
- The Beauty of Montparnasse (1937)
- In Venice, One Night (1937)
- Rasputin (1938)
- The Novel of Werther (1938)
- The Two Schemers (1938)
- Paid Holidays (1938)
- Golden Venus (1938)
- The West (1938)
- Whirlwind of Paris (1939)
- Prince Bouboule (1939)
- The Porter from Maxim's (1939)
- The Fatted Calf (1939)
- Behind the Façade (1939)
- Immediate Call (1939)
- Serenade (1940)
- Romance of Paris (1941)
- The Master Valet (1941)
- Fever (1942)
- Love Marriage (1942)
- The White Truck (1943)
- The Ménard Collection (1944)
- The Captain (1946)
- The Eleven O'Clock Woman (1948)
- The Wolf (1949)
- The Farm of Seven Sins (1949)
- The Atomic Monsieur Placido (1950)
- The Treasure of Cantenac (1950)
- The New Masters (1950)
- La Poison (1951)
- Music in the Head (1951)
- Adhémar (1951)
- Deburau (1951)
- Monsieur Octave (1951)
- A Mother's Secret (1952)
- The Lottery of Happiness (1953)
- Good Lord Without Confession (1953)
- It's the Paris Life (1954)
- Three Days of Fun in Paris (1954)
- Adam Is Eve (1954)
- Interpol Against X (1960)
- All the Gold in the World (1961)
- Hello-Goodbye (1970)

== Bibliography ==
- Goble, Alan. The Complete Index to Literary Sources in Film. Walter de Gruyter, 1999.
