= Montmartre Nights =

1955 film

- Directed by: Pierre Franchi
- Written by: Claude Orval
- Based on: Montmartre Nights by Claude Orval
- Produced by: Robert Florat; André Macadré
- Starring: Jean-Marc Thibault; Louis Seigner; Geneviève Kervine
- Cinematography: Joseph C. Brun
- Edited by: Monique Isnardon; Robert Isnardon
- Music by: Camille Sauvage
- Production company: Filmonde
- Distributed by: Filmonde
- Release date: 9 August 1955
- Running time: 94 minutes
- Country: France
- Language: French

Montmartre Nights (French: Les nuits de Montmartre) is a 1955 French crime film directed by Pierre Franchi and starring Jean-Marc Thibault, Louis Seigner and Geneviève Kervine. The film was shot in Eastmancolor. It was based on a novel by Claude Orval. The film's sets were designed by the art director Claude Bouxin.

== Synopsis ==
Robert Verdier, a young petty criminal, makes a living swindling provincial visitors to the nightlife of Montmartre. However to the concern of Monique, his dancer girlfriend, he is increasingly drawn into more serious crime.

== Main cast ==
- Jean-Marc Thibault as Robert Verdier
- Louis Seigner as Inspecteur Doirel
- Geneviève Kervine as Monique
- Jean Marchat as Mureau
- Albert Dinan as Francis
- Daniel Cauchy as Julien
- Bernard Lajarrige as L'inspecteur Bailly

== Bibliography ==
- Bessy, Maurice & Chirat, Raymond. Histoire du cinéma français: 1951-1955. Pygmalion, 1989.
- Goble, Alan. The Complete Index to Literary Sources in Film. Walter de Gruyter, 1999.
