= Pierre Sergeol =

French actor (1902–1975)

- Born: 22 November 1902; Paris, France
- Died: 18 June 1975 (aged 73); Elbeuf, Seine-Maritime, France
- Occupation: Actor
- Years active: 1931–1969 (film)

Pierre Sergeol (November 22, 1902 – June 18, 1975) was a French film actor. He appeared in numerous films as a character actor in supporting roles. He often played professional figures such as lawyers, judges and police officers.

== Selected filmography ==
- Dans une île perdue (1931)
- He Is Charming (1932)
- Côte d'Azur (1932)
- Transit Camp (1932)
- Dream Castle (1933)
- The Star of Valencia (1933)
- Song of Farewell (1934)
- Southern Mail (1937)
- The Man of the Hour (1937)
- The Silent Battle (1937)
- Mollenard (1938)
- The Last Turning (1939)
- Metropolitan (1939)
- Jericho (1946)
- Goodbye Darling (1946)
- A Friend Will Come Tonight (1946)
- Destiny Has Fun (1947)
- Clockface Café (1947)
- False Identity (1947)
- Coincidences (1947)
- The Cavalier of Croix-Mort (1948)
- The Red Signal (1949)
- Thirst of Men (1950)
- Ballerina (1950)
- My Seal and Them (1951)
- My Friend Oscar (1951)
- Rue des Saussaies (1951)
- The Passerby (1951)
- Full House (1952)
- It Happened in Paris (1952)
- Operation Magali (1953)
- Les amours finissent à l'aube (1953)
- Nagana (1955)
- First of May (1958)
- La bête à l'affût (1959)
- An Angel on Wheels (1959)

== Bibliography ==
- Grant, Kevin. Roots of Film Noir: Precursors from the Silent Era to the 1940s. McFarland, 2022.
- Moore, Gene M. Conrad on Film. Cambridge University Press, 1997.
