= Maurice Régamey =

French-Polish Actor and Director (1924–2009)

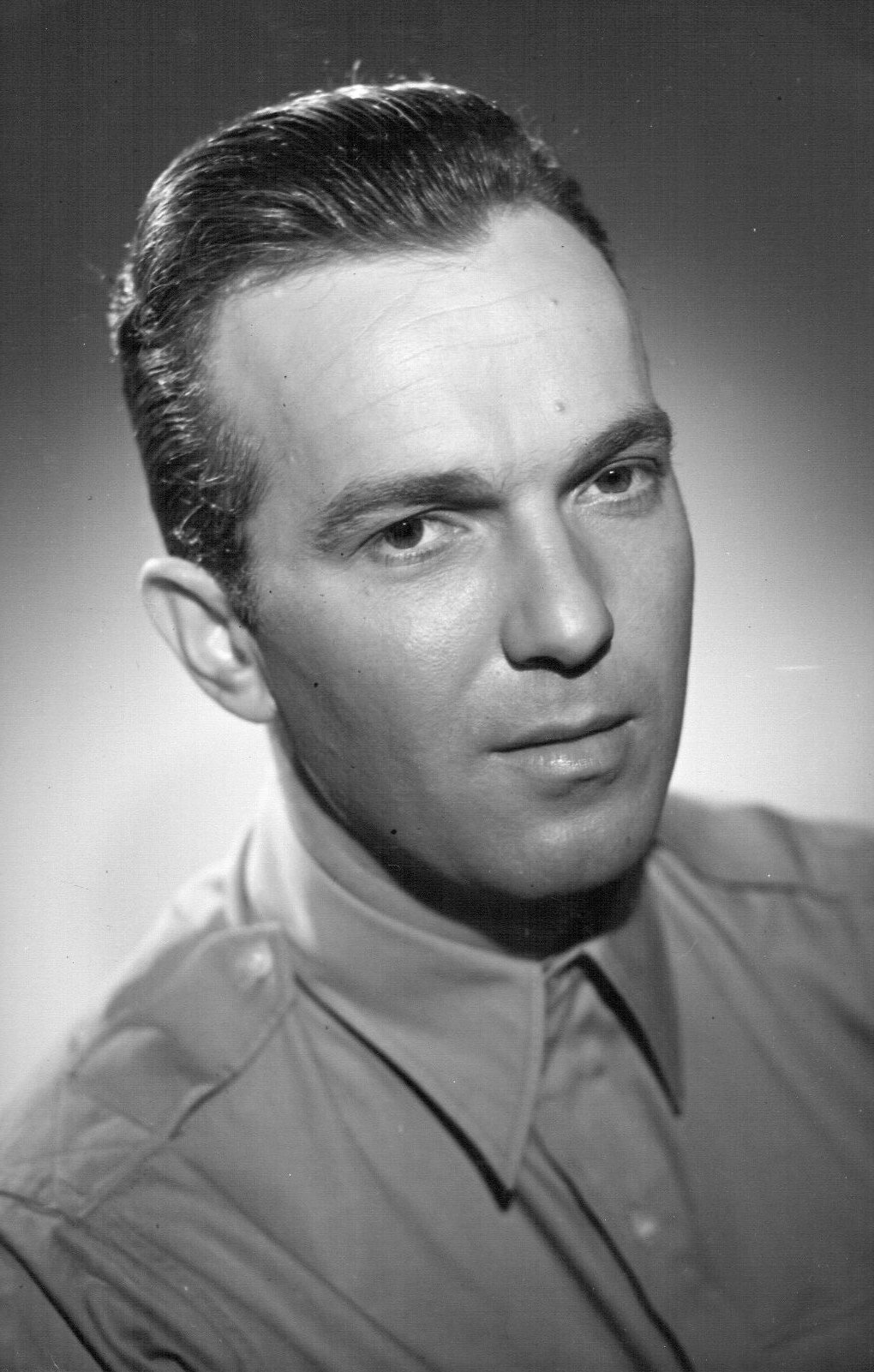
- Born: 7 January 1924; Boryslav, Ucraina
- Died: 23 August 2009 (aged 85); Paris, France
- Occupations: Actor, Writer Director
- Years active: 1944-1966 (film)

Maurice Régamey (1924–2009) was a Polish-born French actor and film director.

== Selected filmography ==
- The Idiot (1946)
- Dawn Devils (1946)
- Maya (1949)
- Cartouche, King of Paris (1950)
- Old Boys of Saint-Loup (1950)
- Lady Paname (1950)
- Rue des Saussaies (1951)
- Duel in Dakar (1951)
- Nightclub (1951)
- The Most Beautiful Girl in the World (1951)
- Love in the Vineyard (1952)
- The Village (1953)
- Honoré de Marseille (1956)
- Rendez-vous avec Maurice Chevalier n°1 (1957)
- Rendez-vous avec Maurice Chevalier n°2 (1957)
- Rendez-vous avec Maurice Chevalier n°3 (1957)
- Rendez-vous avec Maurice Chevalier n°4 (1957)
- Cigarettes, Whiskey and Wild Women (1959)

== Bibliography ==
- Philippe Rège. Encyclopedia of French Film Directors, Volume 1. Scarecrow Press, 2009.
