= Marcel Weiss =

French cinematographer

- Born: 27 July 1912; Paris, France
- Died: 22 October 2009 (aged 97); Saint-Lubin-des-Joncherets, France
- Occupation: Cinematographer
- Years active: 1931–1979 (film)

Marcel Weiss (1912–2009) was a French cinematographer. He began his career as a cameraman during the 1930s, before graduating to director of photography.

== Selected filmography ==
- A Cage of Nightingales (1945)
- Operation Swallow (1948)
- Scandal on the Champs-Élysées (1949)
- Thirst of Men (1950)
- My Brother from Senegal (1953)
- This Man Is Dangerous (1953)
- The Blonde Gypsy (1953)
- One Bullet Is Enough (1954)
- OSS 117 Is Not Dead (1957)
- The Amorous Corporal (1958)
- Mimi Pinson (1958)
- Murder at 45 R.P.M. (1960)
- The Long Absence (1961)
- Codine (1963)
- Solo (1970)
- Love Hate (1971)
- Un linceul n'a pas de poches (1974)

== Bibliography ==
- Smith, Allison. French Cinema in the 1970s: The Echoes of May. Manchester University Press, 2005.
