= A Mother's Secret (1952 film) =

- Directed by: Jean Gourguet
- Written by: Jean Gourguet; Michelle Gourguet
- Produced by: Jean Gourguet
- Starring: André Le Gall; Blanchette Brunoy; Grégoire Aslan
- Cinematography: Scarciafico Hugo
- Edited by: Daniel Lander
- Music by: René Denoncin
- Production company: Société Française de Production
- Distributed by: Héraut Film
- Release date: 24 October 1952
- Running time: 92 minutes
- Country: France
- Language: French

A Mother's Secret (French: Le Secret d'une mère) is a 1952 French drama film directed by Jean Gourguet and starring André Le Gall, Blanchette Brunoy and Grégoire Aslan.

== Synopsis ==
After his wife dies in a car accident, her husband comes to believe that their young daughter is not really his child.

== Cast ==
- André Le Gall as Paul Martin
- Blanchette Brunoy as Françoise Gaudry
- Grégoire Aslan as Georges Lavier
- Jane Marken as Rosa
- Jean Clarieux as Lucien Gaudry
- Robert Hommet as Le docteur Dumont
- Zizi Saint-Clair as Josette Martin
- René Génin as Le père aux chiens
- Jacques Bernier
- Georges Bever
- Monique Gérard
- Héléna Manson
- Mireille Ozy
- Marcel Pérès
- Michel Vadet

== Bibliography ==
- Rège, Philippe. Encyclopedia of French Film Directors, Volume 1. Scarecrow Press, 2009.
