= Denise Bosc =

French actress (1916–2002)

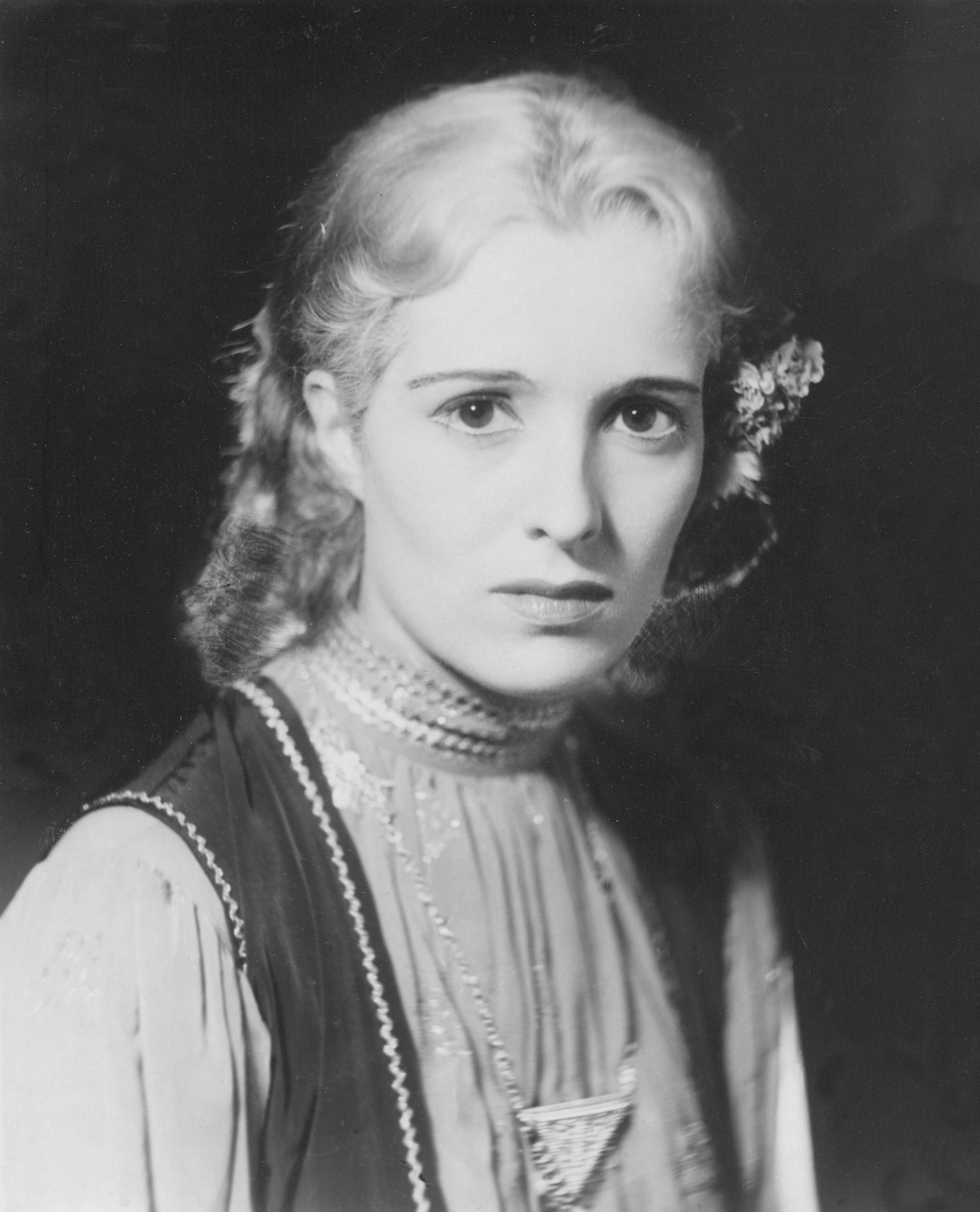
- Born: 19 July 1916; Paris, France
- Died: 9 March 2002 (aged 85); Paris, France
- Other name: Marie Denise Françoise Danviolet
- Occupation: Actress
- Years active: 1937 - 1984 (film)

Denise Bosc (July 19, 1916 – March 9, 2002) was a French film actress. She starred in the 1946 film The Sea Rose. She was the daughter of the actor Henri Bosc.

== Filmography ==
| Year | Title | Role | Notes |
|---|---|---|---|
| 1937 | Le Fauteuil 47 | Loulou | |
| 1937 | Maman Colibri | Madeleine Chadeaux | |
| 1938 | The Girls of the Rhône | Marguerido | |
| 1938 | Clodoche | Dolly | |
| 1939 | Yamilé sous les cèdres | Yamilé el Hamé | |
| 1941 | Saturnin de Marseille | Denise | |
| 1945 | Majestic Hotel Cellars | Hélène Donnegan, la secrétaire des Petersen | |
| 1946 | The Sea Rose | Jeannette | |
| 1947 | One Night at the Tabarin | Micheline | |
| 1949 | Cage of Girls | La Mère Supérieure | |
| 1971 | Daisy Town | | Voice |
| 1976 | Scrambled Eggs | La secrétaire d'Etat | |

== Bibliography ==
- Goble, Alan. The Complete Index to Literary Sources in Film. Walter de Gruyter, 1999.
