= Girl with Grey Eyes =

1945 film

- Directed by: Jean Faurez
- Written by: Maurice Cloche; Pierre Laroche; Jean-Paul Le Chanois
- Starring: Fernand Ledoux; Paul Bernard; Claude Génia
- Cinematography: Nicolas Hayer
- Edited by: Suzanne de Troeye
- Music by: Jean Wiener
- Production company: B.C.M.
- Release date: 24 November 1945
- Running time: 102 minutes
- Country: France
- Language: French

Girl with Grey Eyes (French: La fille aux yeux gris) is a 1945 French drama film directed by Jean Faurez and starring Fernand Ledoux, Paul Bernard and Claude Génia. It was shot at the Photosonor Studios in Paris. The film's sets were designed by the art director René Moulaert. It recorded admissions in France of 1,796,910.

== Synopsis ==
In a small mountain village, a number of past secrets emerge to threaten the harmony of the moment. Meanwhile a love affair takes place between Catherine and a young doctor.

== Cast ==
- Fernand Ledoux as Le père Christophe
- Paul Bernard as M. Henri
- Claude Génia as L'Airelle
- Line Noro as Mme Renard
- Jean Pâqui as Le docteur Bernier
- Nicolas Amato
- Edmond Beauchamp
- Lucien Blondeau as Le docteur Renard
- René-Jean Chauffard
- Eddy Debray
- Nicole Desailly
- Paul Frankeur
- Raymond Loyer
- Albert Montigny
- Robert Moor
- Françoise Morhange as Berthe Renard
- Fernand René as Le maire
- Jacques Roussel
- Hermine Sinclair
- Henri Valbel

== Bibliography ==
- Alain Paucard. La France de Michel Audiard. Age d'homme, 2000.
