= Marcelle Monthil =

- Born: Marcelle Madeleine Montalenti; 8 June 1892; Monaco
- Died: 8 November 1950 (aged 58); Paris, France
- Occupation: Actor
- Years active: 1910–1950

Marcelle Monthil (8 June 1892 – 8 November 1950) was a French film actress.

Born Marcelle Madeleine Montalenti in the Principality of Monaco, she died in Paris.

== Selected filmography ==
- Love Songs (1930)
- When Love Is Over (1931)
- His Best Client (1932)
- The Three Musketeers (1932)
- Cognasse (1932)
- That Scoundrel Morin (1932)
- To the Polls, Citizens (1932)
- Roger la Honte (1933)
- Miquette (1934)
- Crainquebille (1934)
- The Land That Dies (1936)
- A Picnic on the Grass (1937)
- Beating Heart (1940)
- Threats (1940)
- Sins of Youth (1941)
- The Benefactor (1942)
- The Blue Veil (1942)
- The White Waltz (1943)
- The London Man (1943)
- Lucrèce (1943)
- The White Truck (1943)
- The Ménard Collection (1944)
- Children of Paradise (1945)
- Secret Documents (1945)
- Night Warning (1946)
- Last Refuge (1947)
- The Last Vacation (1948)
- The Heart on the Sleeve (1948)
- The Cupboard Was Bare (1948)
- Marlène (1949)
- Last Love (1949)
- Le trésor des Pieds-Nickelés (1950)
- The Girl from Maxim's (1950)
