= Roger Frison-Roche =

French mountain guide, explorer, journalist and novelist (1906–1999)

- Born: Roger Joseph Fernand Frison-Roche; 10 February 1906; Paris, France
- Died: 17 December 1999 (aged 93); Chamonix, France
- Occupations: Mountain guide, explorer, journalist, novelist
- Writing career
- Notable work: Premier de cordée

Roger Joseph Fernand Frison-Roche (10 February 1906 – 17 December 1999) was a French mountain guide, ski instructor, explorer, journalist and novelist. He is best known for his mountaineering novel Premier de cordée, published in English as First on the Rope, which sold more than three million copies.

His reporting and books drew on mountaineering in the French Alps and on journeys in the Sahara and the Arctic. His books were widely translated and sold in the millions. In 1930 he became the first person not born in Chamonix to be admitted to the Compagnie des guides de Chamonix.

== Early life ==
Frison-Roche was born in Paris to a family of Savoyard origin. His family had moved from Beaufort-sur-Doron to run a brasserie in Paris. He left school while young and worked for the Thomas Cook travel agency. He moved to Chamonix in 1923, aged 17, worked in the local tourist office and began climbing in the surrounding mountains. His early climbs included the Aiguille du Grépon and the Aiguille du Moine. He also practised several winter sports, including skiing, ski jumping and bobsleighing. Local people nicknamed the slender newcomer Grand Sifflet, or "big whistle".

== Mountaineering and guiding ==
On 1 September 1925, guide Joseph Ravanel, known as Le Rouge, chose him as a porter for an ascent of Mont Blanc. In 1928 Frison-Roche and Armand Charlet made the first winter ascent of the Aiguille de Bionnassay. That year he also worked with Alfred Couttet to establish the Gaillands climbing school and prepare its rock face.

He received his high-mountain guide's certificate in 1930 and became the first non-Chamoniard admitted to the Chamonix guides' company. He also qualified as a ski instructor and became a local correspondent for Le Petit Dauphinois, writing about skiing. He later held leadership roles in French and international mountain-guide organisations, including the provisional committee of the International Federation of Mountain Guides Associations.

== Journalism and exploration ==
Frison-Roche wrote about mountain sports for newspapers and in 1932 took part in the first live radio broadcast from the summit of Mont Blanc. He later moved with his family to Algiers and worked there for La Dépêche d'Alger. His expeditions in the Sahara supplied material for his first book, L'Appel du Hoggar, published in 1936; two English-language obituaries reported that the book drew on seventeen expeditions.

After the war he returned repeatedly to North Africa, including journeys across the Sahara by camel. He travelled to Lapland in the 1950s and later made several expeditions in northern Canada. In 1966 he returned to Arctic communities to make a documentary about the Inuit. These journeys became subjects for books, lectures and documentary films about desert and Arctic communities.

== Second World War and Resistance ==
In 1942 Frison-Roche worked as a war correspondent on the Tunisian front. German forces captured him and transferred him to France, but he escaped and joined the maquis in Savoy. He later served as a liaison officer with the French Forces of the Interior and finished the war as a lieutenant in the Chasseurs Alpins. His wartime experiences later informed the 1968 novel Les Montagnards de la nuit.

== Literary career ==
While based in Algiers, Frison-Roche wrote Premier de cordée as a newspaper serial in 1941 and sent the manuscript to the Grenoble publisher Arthaud that September. The novel follows the failure and recovery of a young Alpine guide and drew on its author's experience in Chamonix. Its commercial success, wide translation and depiction of guiding helped introduce many readers to mountaineering.

For the rest of his career, he continued to write fiction, travel accounts and illustrated books about three recurring settings: the Alps, the Sahara and the Arctic. Many of his novels were set around Mont Blanc, and he also produced nonfiction accounts of Alpine travel. His other mountain novels included La Grande Crevasse and Retour à la montagne; works based on exploration included La Piste oubliée and Peuples chasseurs de l'Arctique. In 1981 he published an autobiography, Le Versant du soleil.

== Later life and death ==
Frison-Roche eventually settled again in Chamonix, where he named his chalet Derborence after a novel by the Swiss writer Charles-Ferdinand Ramuz. He remained active in writing and mountaineering organisations. He died in hospital in Chamonix on 17 December 1999, aged 93, and was buried in the town.

== Adaptations ==
Louis Daquin directed a film adaptation of Premier de cordée released in 1943. The film retained the novel's French title.

== Honours ==
Frison-Roche was appointed a Commander of the Legion of Honour on 15 August 1992 during the annual Chamonix guides' festival.

== Selected works ==
- Premier de cordée (1941; English: First on the Rope)
- La Grande Crevasse (1948; English: The Big Crevice, 1952)
- La Piste oubliée (1950; English: The Lost Trail of the Sahara, 1952, translated by Paul Bowles)
- Les Montagnards de la nuit (1968; English: The Mountain Soldiers of the Night)
- L'Appel du Hoggar (1936)
- Retour à la montagne (1957)
- Peuples chasseurs de l'Arctique (1966)
- Le Versant du soleil (1981; autobiography)
