= René-Jean Chauffard =

French actor (1920–1972)

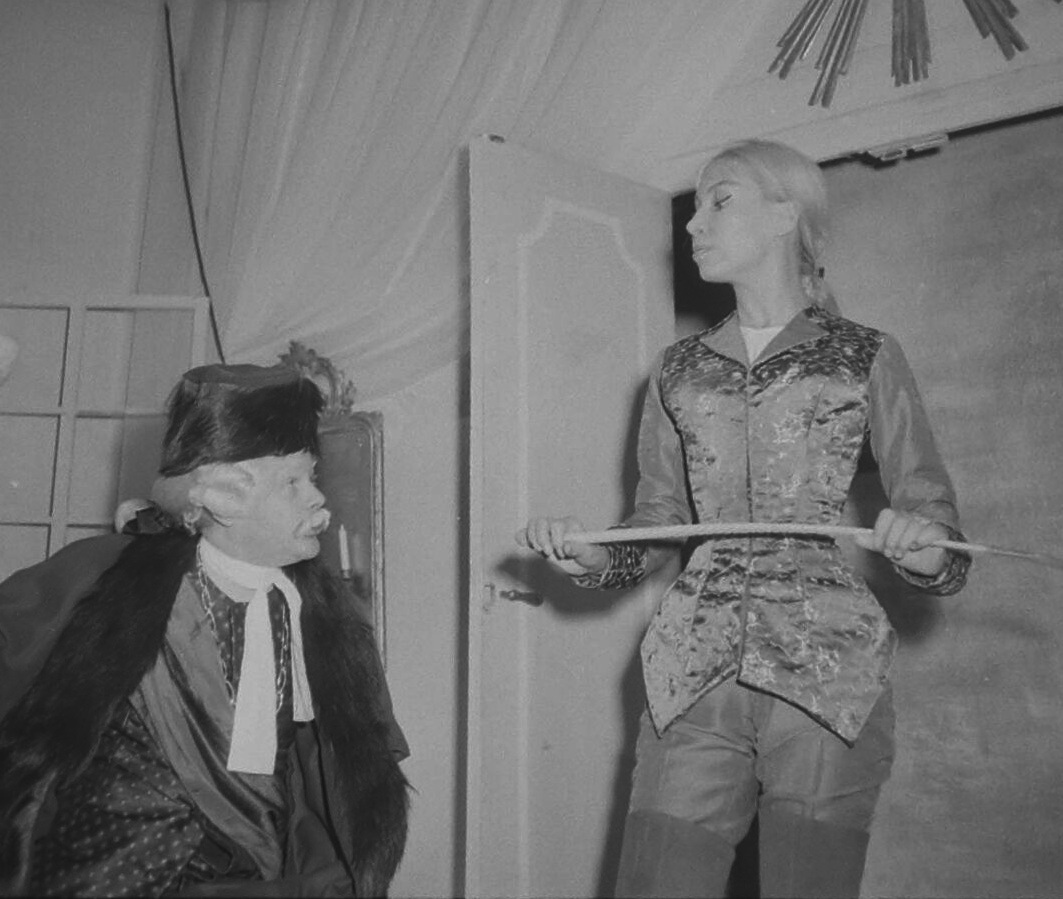
- Born: 24 August 1920; Paris, France
- Died: 30 October 1972 (aged 52); Paris, France
- Occupation: Actor
- Years active: 1945–1972

René-Jean Chauffard (24 August 1920 – 30 October 1972) was a French film actor. He appeared in 40 films between 1945 and 1972.

== Selected filmography ==
- Girl with Grey Eyes (1945)
- The Ideal Couple (1946)
- The Lovers of Pont Saint Jean (1947)
- Clochemerle (1948)
- Three Telegrams (1950)
- Paris Vice Squad (1951)
- Le Secret d'Hélène Marimon (1954)
- Blood and Roses (1960)
- The Sahara Is Burning (1961)
- Jealous as a Tiger (1964)
- The Duke's Gold (1965)
- Solo (1970) as the redhead
- Love Hate (1971) as Commissioner Gaber
- La Part des lions (1971)
