= Andrée Clément =

French actress

- Born: 7 August 1918; Marseille, France
- Died: 31 May 1954 (aged 35); Paris, France
- Occupation: Actress
- Years active: 1943–1954 (film)

Andrée Clément (7 August 1918 – 31 May 1954) was a French film actress. Her husband was killed in 1940 during the Battle of France. She herself died from tuberculosis in Paris in 1954 at the age of thirty five.

== Filmography ==
Year	Title	Role	Notes
1943	Angels of Sin	Soeur Élisabeth	
1944	First on the Rope	Suzanne Servettaz	
1946	La fille du diable	Isabelle	
1946	Pastoral Symphony	Piette Castéran	
1946	Back Streets of Paris	Simone	
1947	Bethsabée	Evelyne – la fille du colonel, maîtresse de Sommerville	
1947	Coincidences	Françoise	
1948	Une grande fille toute simple	Esther	
1950	Thirst of Men	Alice	
1950	God Needs Men	Scholastique Kerneis	
1953	Follow That Man	Arlette Génod	
1953	Rhine Virgin	Anna Berg	
1954	Daughters of Destiny	La mère	(segment "Jeanne"), (final film role)

== Bibliography ==
- Hayward, Susan. French Costume Drama of the 1950s: Fashioning Politics in Film. Intellect Books, 2010.
