= Jean Wiener =

French musician

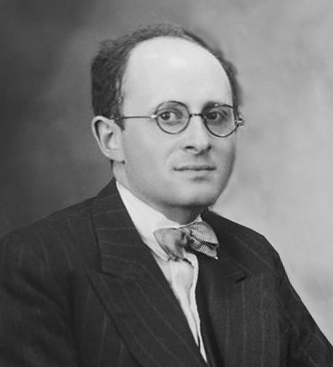
Jean Wiener, 1927

Jean Wiener (or Wiéner) (19 March 1896, 14th arrondissement of Paris – 8 June 1982, Paris) was a French pianist and composer. He was of some significance in the promotion of new music, both by his friends in the Les Six (Milhaud, Poulenc, etc.), and by composers such as Schoenberg, Berg and Webern. His compositions involve the use of jazz informed by French wit and elegance. He is best known for composing the music to more than 300 films of both feature and short film length.

== Life and career ==
=== Early life, education, and classical pianist ===
Jean Wiener was born in Paris on 19 March 1896. He was trained at the Conservatoire de Paris where he was a pupil of André Gedalge (composition) and Yves Nat (piano). At the conservatoire he befriended his fellow classmate Darius Milhaud with whom he maintained a lifelong friendship. He was also a close friend of Erik Satie who would frequently visited Wiener's home or met with him at social events. Trained as a classical pianist at the conservatory, he was highly gifted in this regard and notably performed the premiere of Igor Stravinsky's Trois mouvements de Petrouchka in December 1922 at a special Christmas concert organized by the composer. In May 1924 he performed the premiere of Stravinsky's Concerto for Piano and Wind Instruments in an arrangement for two pianos with the composer as his fellow keyboardist. This was a private concert given ten days prior to the work's official premiere. He subsequently toured with Stravinsky in concerts of this work.

=== Jazz pianist and concert impresario ===
During World War I Wiener encountered jazz and ragtime for the first time from American troops in France who brought that music with them, and he subsequently began playing jazz in the post-War years as the house pianist at Bar Gaya in Paris. He took this job largely because of his financial problems, and was committed to playing from seven in the evening until two in the morning. He subsequently worked as the pianist at Le Boeuf sur le Toit; beginning when it opened in January 1922 when Bar Gaya's owner decided to open larger premises due to the large crowds Weiner was attracting to the tiny Bar Gaya venue. In the early 1920s Bar Gaya was a frequented spot by many artists and musicians of note, among them Pablo Picasso, Marcel Duchamp, Francis Picabia, Jean Cocteau, Max Jacob, and the composers of Les Six whom Wiener befriended. This crowd followed Weiner to Le Boeuf sur le Toit which became a center of both jazz and avant-garde music in Paris.

Wiener's close friendships with important French composers led him to establish an influential concert series known as the Concerts Wiener which were given from 1921 through 1924. The series was known for challenging what was acceptable as concert music; boldly programming avant-garde works by young French composer, including those of Les Six, alongside jazz and popular music. It was rare among French concerts of its era not only for promoting new music but also for featuring contemporary German and Austrian repertoire at a time when anti-German sentiment was high in France. This included the first performance in France of Arnold Schoenberg's Pierrot lunaire. Milhaud and André Gide's secular cantata for 5 voices and chamber ensemble, Le retour de l'enfant prodigue (composed 1917), was given its first performance at one of these concerts on 23 November 1922 at the Théâtre des Champs-Élysées.

=== Wiener et Doucet ===
Wiener's concert series was financially supported by Winnaretta Singer, Princess de Polignac, and she notably commissioned Weiner's Concerto franco-américain for piano and strings in which he incorporated American jazz idioms with French popular song and neo-Baroque music. The success of the October 1924 premiere of this work at Weiner concert series led the composer to create a piano duo arrangement for the work that he could more easily tour with. He enlisted the Belgian pianist Clement Doucet as his performing partner in a successful concert tour in which the pair interspersed classical works by composers like Bach and Mozart and popular music such as hot dance, blues, and jazz. The playing relationship between Doucet and Wiener had begun earlier at the Le Boeuf sur le Toit in c. 1922 where they began performing periodically as a jazz piano duo.

The success of Wiener's initial concert tour with Doucet led to a longtime collaboration between the two men. As Wiener et Doucet, they performed together routinely from 1925 through 1938; appearing internationally in music halls, variety theatre, and major concert venues in both Europe and the North America. They also made numerous recordings together.

=== Film composer and later life ===
In the midst of touring with Doucet, Wiener began working as a film score composer in the 1930s, often in collaboration with the conductor Roger Desormière. With the outbreak of World War II he stopped performing and because of his Jewish background spent time in hiding while Paris was occupied by Nazi Germany. During this time he continued to compose film scores anonymously with his friend Roger Désormière putting his name to the scores and collecting money for Wiener so that he could maintain income to live.

After the end of the war in 1945, Wiener continued to devote himself fully to composition; most often but not limited to film scores. He composed the opening theme music used by the Office of French Radio and Television's history series Histoires sans paroles which aired from 1964-1986. His compositional output included the scores to more than 300 films encompassing both feature and short film lengths.

Stéphane Wiener (January 25, 1922 – April 12, 1998, alto player in the Lespine Quartet) is his son (from his first marriage). His daughter (from his second marriage), Elizabeth Wiener, is an actress, singer and singer-songwriter.

Jean Wiener published his memoirs in 1978 as Allegro Appassionato. Most of his music remains unpublished. He died in Paris on June 8, 1982 at the age of 86.

== Compositions ==
=== Concert and chamber works ===
Wiener composed a number of concertos which included a Concerto Franco-Americain (1924) notable for its influences of jazz, a concerto that he described as Concert Pour Orchestre Et Un Piano Principal (1970, concerto for orchestra and a principal piano), and a concerto for accordion (1966).

His chamber music includes a sonata for cello and piano. In 1955 he set a selection of Robert Desnos' Chantefables for voice and piano.

=== Solo piano music ===
- Sonatine Syncopée (1921)
- Sonate N°1 (1925)
- Sonate N°2 (1928)
- 2ème Sonatine (1928)
- Quatre petits pièces Radio (1947)
- Polka, Java and Tango (1957)
- Sonate Sans Nom (1973)
- Sonate ‘démodée’ (à la mémoire de Darius Milhaud) (1974)
- Touchez Pas Au Grisbi
- Chicken Reel (Histoire Sans Parole)
- Trois Mouvements De Musique Pour Le Piano (1980)
- Pour Pierre Cornevin (1981)

=== Film scores ===
==== 1920s ====
- La Femme de nulle part (1922)

==== 1930s ====
- Buridan's Donkey (1932)
- The Man with the Hispano (1933)
- Une Vie perdue (1933)
- Knock ou le triomphe de la médecine (1933)
- Le Paquebot Tenacity (1934)
- Les affaires publiques (1934)
- The Adventurer (1934)
- Maria Chapdelaine (1934)
- Bux the Clown (1935)
- The Slipper Episode (1935)
- La Bandera (1935)
- The Crew (1935)
- L'Homme sans cœur (1936)
- When Midnight Strikes (1936)
- Le Crime de Monsieur Lange (1936)
- La Garçonne (1936)
- Klokslag twaalf (1936)
- Rose (1936)
- Les Bas-fonds (1936)
- Vive la vie (1937)
- The Man of the Hour (1937)
- Nuits de feu (1937)
- De Man zonder hart (1937)
- Runaway Ladies (1938)
- The Woman from the End of the World (1938)
- Le Dernier tournant (1939)

==== 1940s ====
- Cristobal's Gold (1940)
- L'Épouvantail (1943)
- Les Passagers de la Grande Ourse (1943)
- Untel père et fils (1943)
- Strange Inheritance (1943, non-crédité)
- Madame et le mort (1943)
- Le Voleur de paratonnerres (1944)
- Father Goriot (1945)
- Girl with Grey Eyes (1945)
- The Captain (1946)
- Patrie (1946)
- Impasse (1946)
- Once is Enough (1946)
- Macadam (1946)
- Panic (1946)
- Pour une nuit d'amour (1947)
- Le Diable souffle (1947)
- Counter Investigation (1947)
- Les Frères Bouquinquant (1947)
- La Carcasse et le tord-cou (1948)
- Daybreak (1949)
- Rendez-vous de juillet (1949)
- The White Squadron (1949)
- The Perfume of the Lady in Black (1949)

==== 1950s ====
- Skipper Next to God (1951)
- Ein Lächeln in Sturm (1951)
- Sous le ciel de Paris (1951)
- Les Poussières (1953)
- Je suis un mouchard (1953)
- Paris mon copain (1954)
- Paris (1954)
- Station 307 (1954)
- Touchez pas au grisbi (1954)
- La Rafle est pour ce soir (1954)
- Futures vedettes, directed by Marc Allégret, (1955), composer and actor (playing a piano teacher)
- Le Rendez-vous des quais (1955)
- Le Comte de Monte-Cristo (1954)
- La Soupe à la grimace (1955)
- Sur le banc (1955)
- Deadlier Than the Male (1956)
- La Vie est belle (1956)
- Les Lumières du soir (1956)
- Notre-Dame – Cathédrale de Paris (1957)
- Pot-Bouille (1957)
- Seventh Heaven (1958)
- Neither Seen Nor Recognized (1958)
- Be Beautiful But Shut Up (1958)
- The Female (1959)
- La Création du monde (1959)
- An Angel on Wheels (1959)
- Arrêtez le massacre (1959)

==== 1960s ====
- The Nabob Affair (1960)
- La Revenante (1960)
- Pantalaskas (1960)
- Les Bras de la nuit (1961)
- Midnight Folly (1961)
- Quatre-vingt-treize (1962, TV)
- Le Match (1964, TV)
- Our Agent Tiger (1965)
- Merlusse (1965, TV)
- A la belle étoile (1966)
- Au hasard Balthazar (1966)
- Mouchette (1967)
- Le Golem (1967, TV)
- Benjamin (1968)
- A Gentle Woman (1969)

==== 1970s ====
- Reportages sur un squelette ou Masques et bergamasques (1970, TV)
- The Demise of Father Mouret (1970)
- The Little Theatre of Jean Renoir (1970, TV)
- La Cavale (1971)
- Les Gens de Mogador (1972, TV)
- Féminin-féminin (1973)
- Les Roses de Manara (1976, TV)
- Duelle (1976)
- Inutile d'envoyer la photo (1977)

==== 1980s ====
- Square X (1981)
- Lettres d'amour en Somalie (1982)
- Le Crime d'amour (1982)

=== Stage works ===
- Olive chez les nègres, ou Le village blanc (1926, operetta)
