= André Le Gall =

French actor (1917–1974)

- Born: 14 March 1917; Paris, France
- Died: 25 June 1974 (aged 57); Bois-Colombes, France
- Occupation: Actor
- Years active: 1943-1975 (film & TV)

André Le Gall (1917–1974) was a French stage and film actor.

== Selected filmography ==
- Goodbye Leonard (1943)
- Love Around the Clock (1943)
- First on the Rope (1944)
- Fantômas (1946)
- Le bataillon du ciel (1947)
- Passeurs d'or (1948)
- The Wreck (1949)
- I Like Only You (1949)
- La taverna della libertà (1950)
- Prelude to Glory (1950)
- The Case of Doctor Galloy (1951)
- Guilty? (1951)
- The Angel of Sin (1952)
- A Mother's Secret (1952)
- Operation Magali (1953)
- Love Hate (1971) as Lucien Grimm
- Daisy Town (1971)

== Bibliography ==
- Crisp, Colin. French Cinema—A Critical Filmography: Volume 2, 1940-1958. Indiana University Press, 2015.
