= Marie-France (actress) =

French actress

- Born: 7 February 1943 (age 83)
- Other name: La petite Marie-France
- Occupation: Actress
- Years active: 1949-1954

Marie-France (Marie-France Plumer; born 7 February 1943) is a French actress known mainly for her roles as a child.

In 1959 she sang on an album with Maurice Chevalier.

== Selected filmography ==
- Return to Life (1949)
- Beautiful Love (1951)
- Music in the Head (1951)
- Her Last Christmas (1952)
- Trial at the Vatican (1952)
- Dortoir des grandes (1954)
