= Patrie (1946 film) =

1946 film

- Directed by: Louis Daquin
- Written by: Pierre Bost; Charles Spaak; Louis Daquin
- Based on: Patrie by Victorien Sardou
- Produced by: Arys Nissotti; Pierre O'Connell; Georges Lourau
- Starring: Pierre Blanchar; Maria Mauban; Jean Desailly
- Cinematography: André Bac; Nicolas Hayer
- Edited by: Suzanne de Troeye
- Music by: Jean Wiener
- Production company: Filmsonor Marceau
- Distributed by: Régina Distribution
- Release date: 23 September 1946
- Running time: 100 minutes
- Country: France
- Language: French

Patrie (English: Country) is a 1946 French historical drama film directed by Louis Daquin and starring Pierre Blanchar, Maria Mauban and Jean Desailly. It was entered into the 1946 Cannes Film Festival. Like the 1917 silent film of the same title it is based on the 1869 play by Victorien Sardou. It was shot at the Epinay Studios in Paris. The film's sets were designed by the art director René Moulaert.

== Plot ==
In Brussels in the 1560s the rebelling Flemish nobles are battling the Spanish under the Duke of Alba. The Count De Rysoor, a prominent leader, is planning an uprising aiming to hold the city until relief from William of Orange can arrive. When he discovers an affair his wife is having with a fellow officer, he at first turns a blind eye to it as he always puts his country before his private concerns. However it soon begins to put the whole conspiracy at risk.

== Cast ==
- Pierre Blanchar as Le comte de Rysoor
- Jean Desailly as Karloo
- Maria Mauban as La comtesse de Rysoor
- Lucien Nat as Duke of Alba
- Pierre Dux as Jonas
- Julien Bertheau as William of Orange
- Louis Seigner as Vargas
- Pierre Asso as Pablo
- Marcel Lupovici as Del Rio
- Mireille Perrey as Catherine Jonas
- Nathalie Nattier as La camériste
- Marie Leduc as Donna Rafaela
- Fernand René as Un échevin
- Louis Florencie as Un échevin
- Jacqueline Duc as La mariée
- Guy Decomble as Un échevin

== Bibliography ==
- Goble, Alan. The Complete Index to Literary Sources in Film. Walter de Gruyter, 1999.
- Sieglohr, Ulrike. Heroines Without Heroes: Reconstructing Female and National Identities in European Cinema, 1945-51. Bloomsbury Publishing, 2016.
