= Duel in Dakar =

- Directed by: Georges Combret; Claude Orval
- Written by: Georges Combret; Claude Orval
- Produced by: Georges Combret
- Starring: Maurice Régamey; Pierre Cressoy; Lysiane Rey
- Cinematography: Pierre Petit
- Edited by: Germaine Fouquet
- Music by: Hubert Giraud
- Production company: Radius Productions
- Distributed by: Cocinor
- Release date: 6 December 1951
- Running time: 80 minutes
- Country: France
- Language: French

Duel in Dakar (French: Duel à Dakar) is a 1951 French film directed by Georges Combret and Claude Orval and starring Maurice Régamey, Pierre Cressoy and Lysiane Rey.

== Cast ==
- Maurice Régamey as Robert Vernier
- Pierre Cressoy as M. Pascal
- Lysiane Rey as Monique Gambier
- François Patrice as Julien Gambier
- Irène de Trebert as Irène
- Alexandre Rignault as Martinzal
- René Blancard as Doirel, chef du S.R.
- Raoul Marco as Vaminy
- Jean Gaven as Fred
- Jacques Dynam as Reinard
- Michel Flamme as Martin
- Paul Azaïs as Marco
- Maria Aranda
- Paul Bonifas as Le commandant
- Jean Clarieux as L'agent
- Fransined as Jimmy
- Robert Le Béal as Max
- René Lebrun
- Raymond Raynal as Bertrand
- Émile Riandreys as Le barman
- Jean Thielment as Charley
- André Wasley

== Bibliography ==
- Philippe Rège. Encyclopedia of French Film Directors, Volume 1. Scarecrow Press, 2009.
