= The White Truck =

- Theatrical film poster
- French: Le camion blanc
- Directed by: Léo Joannon
- Written by: André-Paul Antoine; André Cayatte; Léo Joannon
- Produced by: Léo Joannon
- Starring: Jules Berry; Blanchette Brunoy; François Périer
- Cinematography: Nikolai Toporkoff
- Edited by: Jacques Grassi
- Music by: Louis Pasquier; Roger Roger
- Production company: MAIC
- Distributed by: Regina Distribution
- Release date: 24 March 1943
- Running time: 112 minutes
- Country: France
- Language: French

The White Truck (French: Le camion blanc) is a 1943 French comedy drama film directed by Léo Joannon and starring Jules Berry, Blanchette Brunoy and François Périer.

The film's sets were designed by the art director Jean Douarinou.

== Plot ==
A young garage mechanic is hired for an unusual assignment, to drive a white truck around France carrying the corpse of a famed gypsy leader.

== Cast ==
- Jules Berry as Shabbas - the chief of the northern gypsies
- Blanchette Brunoy as Germaine
- François Périer as François Ledru - a young mechanic
- Fernand Charpin as Courbassié - gypsies' southern ambassador
- Marguerite Moreno as The King's Widow
- Roger Karl as Acho
- Mila Parély as Madame Dupont
- Jean Parédès as Ernest
- Marcelle Monthil as Germaine's mother
- Charles Lemontier as Germaine's father
- Edmond Beauchamp as gypsy
- Robert Berri as pump attendant
- Georges Bever as ticket inspector
