= Coincidences (film) =

1947 film

- Directed by: Serge Debecque
- Written by: Serge Debecque; Pierre Laroche
- Produced by: Jean Jeannin; Jules Suchanek
- Starring: Serge Reggiani; Andrée Clément; Pierre Renoir
- Cinematography: Jean Isnard
- Edited by: Marity Cléris
- Music by: Germaine Tailleferre
- Production company: Equipes Artisanales Cinématographiques
- Distributed by: Lux Compagnie Cinématographique de France
- Release date: 15 October 1947
- Running time: 95 minutes
- Country: France
- Language: French

Coincidences (French: Coïncidences) is a 1947 French drama film directed by Serge Debecque and starring Serge Reggiani, Andrée Clément and Pierre Renoir. It was shot at the Boulogne Studios in Paris and on location in Lyon. The film's sets were designed by the art director Maurice Colasson.

== Synopsis ==
The librarian of a wealthy textile manufacturer from Lyon is in love with his employer's daughter, but she is engaged to another man an army officer. When he is offered three magic balls that will seemingly change his fortunes, he accepts, but they ultimately lead towards a tragic destiny.

== Cast ==
- Serge Reggiani as Jean Ménétrier
- Andrée Clément as Françoise
- Pierre Renoir as Monsieur Bardolas
- Sylvie as Amélie
- Jean Parédès as Montboron
- Pierre Sergeol as Poncet - un assureur
- Maurice Schutz as Le vieux paysan
- Louis Florencie as Pierre Calmiran - un assureur
- Robert Le Béal as Gérard Tibur
- Guy Favières as Le père de Françoise
- Marcel Vibert as Le médecin
- Suzanne Bara as Bardolas' Secretary
- Ulric Guttinguer as L'architecte
- Albert Gercourt as Monsieur Goulard - le contremaître
- Marcel Charvey as L'agent immobilier
- Denise Grey as Madame Bardolas
- Françoise Delille as Michèle

== Bibliography ==
- Rège, Philippe. Encyclopedia of French Film Directors, Volume 1. Scarecrow Press, 2009.
