= Cristina Grado =

Italian actress (1939–2016)

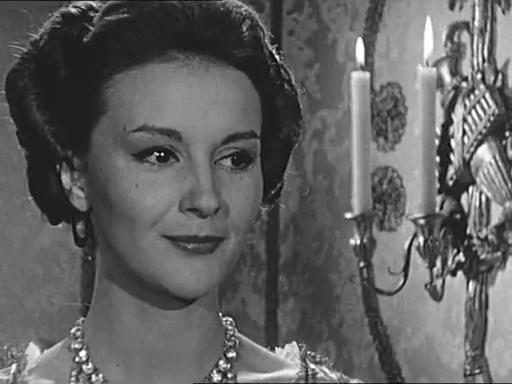
- Grado in 1961
- Born: Maria Cristina Grado; 2 February 1939; Rome, Kingdom of Italy
- Died: 3 January 2016 (aged 76); Rome, Italy
- Occupations: Actress; voice actress
- Years active: 1953–2016
- Children: Alessandra Grado

Maria Cristina Grado (2 February 1939 – 3 January 2016) was an Italian actress and voice actress. She also worked as a voice actress, dubbing foreign films for release in the Italian market.

Initially active at ARS and then at Sinc Cinematografica, she was the mother of the voice actress Alessandra Grado.

== Selected filmography ==
- Naples Sings (1953)
- We, the Women (1953)
- Cavalcade of Song (1953)
- The Count of Monte Cristo (1954)
- Tower of Lust (1955)
- The Courier of Moncenisio (1956)
- The Angel of the Alps (1957)

== Bibliography ==
- Hayward, Susan. French Costume Drama of the 1950s: Fashioning Politics in Film. Intellect Books, 2010.
