= Father Goriot (film) =

1945 film

- Directed by: Robert Vernay
- Screenplay by: Charles Spaak; Bernard Zimmer
- Based on: Father Goriot by Honoré de Balzac
- Produced by: Arys Nissotti; Pierre O'Connell
- Starring: Pierre Renoir; Claude Génia; Lise Delamare
- Cinematography: Victor Arménise; Maurice Barry
- Edited by: Suzanne de Troeye
- Music by: Roger Désormière; Jean Wiener
- Production company: Regina Productions
- Distributed by: DisCina
- Release date: 22 March 1945
- Running time: 103 minutes
- Country: France
- Language: French

Father Goriot (French: Le père Goriot) is a 1945 French historical drama film directed by Robert Vernay and starring Pierre Renoir, Claude Génia and Lise Delamare. It is an adaptation of the 1835 novel of the same title by Honoré de Balzac. It was shot in 1944 but not released until the following year. The film was shot at the Cité Elgé in Paris. The film's sets were designed by the art director René Renoux.

== Cast ==
- Pierre Renoir as Vautrin
- Claude Génia as Delphine de Nucingen
- Lise Delamare as Madame de Beauséant
- Pierre Larquey as Le père Goriot
- Georges Rollin as Eugène de Rastignac
- Sylvie as Mademoiselle Michonneau
- Léonce Corne as Le baron de Nucingen
- Maurice Escande as Monsieur de Restaud
- Jean Desailly as Bianchon
- Raymond Rognoni as Poiret
- Cécilia Paroldi as Victorine
- Made Siamé as Mademoiselle Couture
- Denise Nast as Sylvie
- Marcel Delaître as Le policier
- Henri Coutet as Christophe
- Pierre Vernet as Maxime de Trailles
- François Viguier as Gobseck
- Marcelle Praince as Madame Vauquer
- Suzet Maïs as Anastasie de Restaud

== Bibliography ==
- Heathcote, Owen & Watts, Andrew. The Cambridge Companion to Balzac. Cambridge University Press, 2017.
- Oscherwitz, Dayna & Higgins, MaryEllen. The A to Z of French Cinema. Scarecrow Press, 2009.
