= Fernand Ledoux =

French actor (1897–1993)

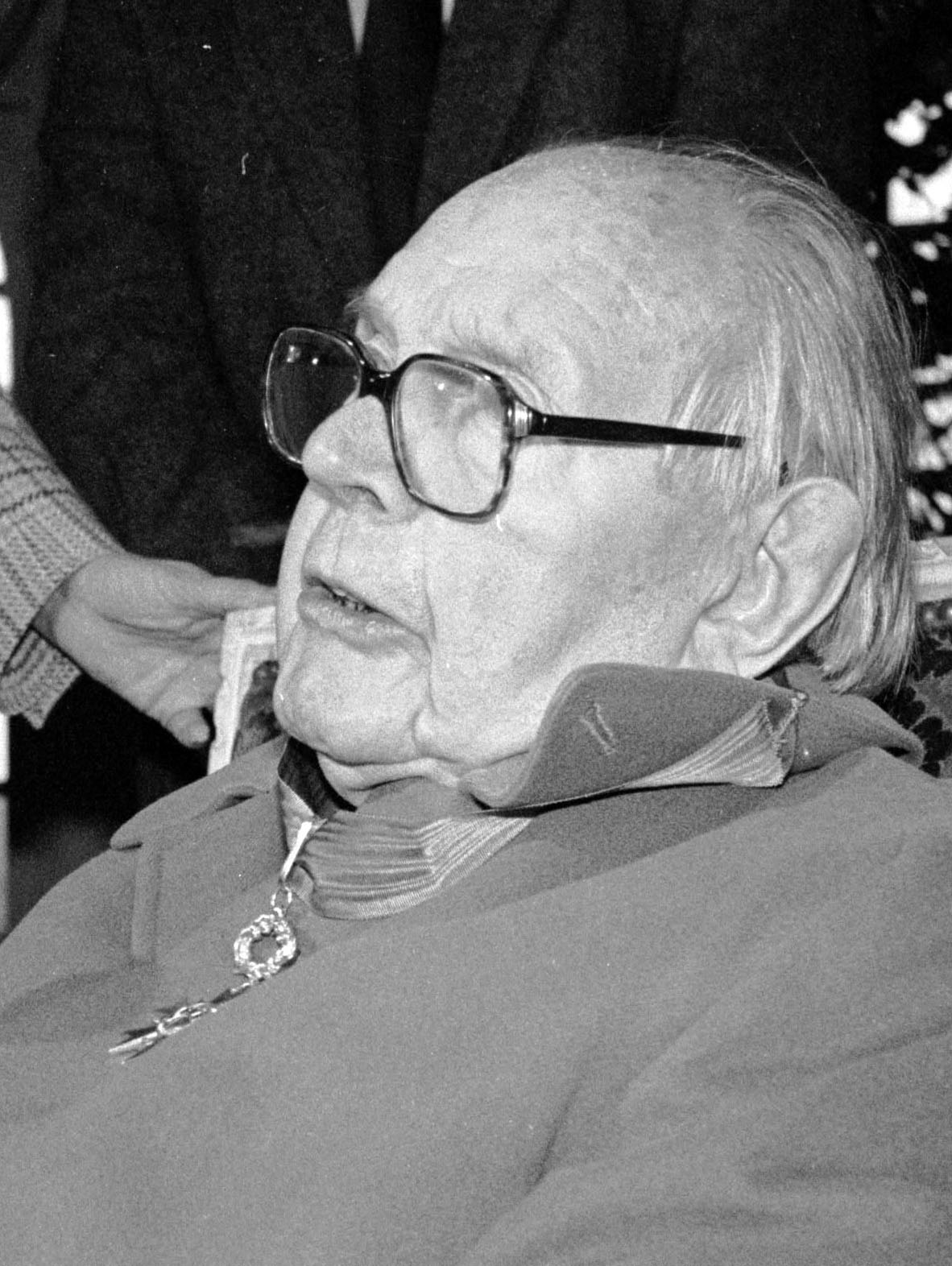
- Ledoux in 1992
- Born: Jacques Joseph Félix Fernand Ledoux; 24 January 1897; Tienen, Flemish Brabant, Belgium
- Died: 21 September 1993 (aged 96); Villerville, Normandy, France
- Education: CNSAD
- Occupations: Actor, theatre director
- Years active: 1918–1982

Jacques Joseph Félix Fernand Ledoux (24 January 1897 – 21 September 1993) was a Belgian-French actor and theatre director.

== Early life and education ==
Ledoux was born in Tienen in 1897, to a Belgian father and a French mother. He was raised bilingual in French and Flemish. He was educated at a minor seminary in Sint-Truiden. During the First World War, he enlisted in the French Army, where he was assigned to a machine gun infantry unit. He was discharged as a Sergeant.

After the war, Ledoux moved to Paris and enrolled in the Conservatoire national supérieur d'art dramatique.

== Career ==
Leoux began his career with small roles at the Comédie-Française in 1921. He appeared in close to 80 films, with his best remembered role being the stationmaster Roubaud in Jean Renoir's La Bête humaine (1938), but he remained primarily a theatrical actor for the duration of his career. In 1938, he opened an acting school at the Théâtre Pigalle with Alfred Adam and Pierre Dux.

In 1939, at the age of 43, he re-enlisted in the Army, and served in the 212th Regional Regiment of Fontainebleau. In 1942, he resigned from the Comédie-Française in protest of the German occupation. He returned in 1950 as a prominent member.

Among other honours, Ledoux was acclaimed an Officer of the Legion of Honour, a Commander of the Ordre national du Mérite, and a Commander of the Ordre des Arts et des Lettres.

== Personal life and death ==
Married to Fernande Thabuy, with whom he had four children, Ledoux was an amateur painter, and lived for many years at Pennedepie in Normandy. Later he moved to Villerville, where he died and where he is buried.

== Selected filmography ==
- L'homme à la barbiche (1933)
- Le Train de 8 heures 47 (1934) as Flick
- L'homme des Folies Bergère (1935) as François
- Mayerling (1936) as Philippe de Cobourg
- Taras Bulba (1936) as Tovkatch
- The Beloved Vagabond (1936) as Major Walters
- Altitude 3.200 (1938) as Le docteur
- Alert in the Mediterranean (1938) as Martin
- La Bête Humaine (1938) as Roubaud
- Volpone (1941) as Corvino
- Premier Rendez-vous (1941) as Nicolas Rougemont
- First Ball (1941) as Michel Noblet
- L'assassinat du Père Noël (1941) as Noirgoutte, le maire
- Stormy Waters (1941) as Kerlo, le bosco
- Le Lit à colonnes (1942) as Porey-Cave
- Les Visiteurs du Soir (1942) as Le baron Hugues - le châtelain, père d'Anne
- La grande marnière (1943) as Carvajan
- Untel père et fils (1943) as Le maire
- It Happened at the Inn (1943) as Léopold Goupi dit Goupi-Mains-Rouges
- Des jeunes filles dans la nuit (1943) as Auguste
- The Man from London (1943) as Maloin
- Behold Beatrice (1944) as Le docteur Mauléon
- Girl with Grey Eyes (1945) as Le père Christophe
- The Bellman (1945) as Fabret, le 'lièvre'
- The Devil's Daughter (1946) as Le docteur / The doctor
- The Sea Rose (1946) as Romain Jardehu
- Danger of Death (1947) as Le pharmacien Loiseau
- Eternal Conflict (1948) as Le professeur Janvier
- The Shadow (1948) as Firmin Blache
- White Paws (1949) as Jock Le Guen
- The Barton Mystery (1949) as Beverley
- Histoires extraordinaires à faire peur ou à faire rire... (1949) as Montrésor
- Monseigneur (1949) as Piétrefond
- Wolves Hunt at Night (1952) as Thomas Mollert - un membre du Deuxième Bureau
- La Bergère et le ramoneur (1952) as Le roi (voice)
- Act of Love (1953) as Fernand Lacaud
- Papa, maman, la bonne et moi (1954) as Fernand Langlois
- Fortune carrée (1955) as Le Cadi
- Men in White (1955) as Dr. Delpuech
- Papa, maman, ma femme et moi (1955) as Fernand Langlois
- On ne badine pas avec l'amour (1955)
- Law of the Streets (1956) as Père Blain
- Les Aventures de Até L'Espiegle (1957) as Claes
- He Who Must Die (1957) as Priest Grigoris
- The Violent (1957) as Pierre Tiercelin
- Les Misérables (1958) as Monseigneur Myriel
- Christine (1958) as Weiring as le père de Christine
- I Spit on Your Grave (1959) as Horace Chandley
- Cartagine in fiamme (1960)
- Recours en grâce (1960) as Le curé
- The Truth (1960) as Le médecin légiste
- The Big Gamble (1961) as Customs Official
- The Longest Day (1962) as Louis
- Freud: The Secret Passion (1962) as Dr. Charcot
- The Trial (1962) as Chief Clerk of the Law Court
- Le Glaive et la Balance (1963) as Le procureur
- Up from the Beach (1965) as Barrelmaker
- La Communale (1965) as L'inspecteur
- Under the Sign of the Bull (1969) as Le juge
- Peau d'Âne (1970) as Le roi rouge, le seconde roi
- Moi y'en a vouloir des sous (1973) as Sauveur Chouras
- Bel Ordure (1973) as Le gardien de prison
- Les Granges brûlées (1973) as Le doyen des juges
- Les Chinois à Paris (1974) as Abel Frugebelle, de l'Acamédie Française
- Alice ou la Dernière Fugue (1977) as Le Vieil Homme et le Docteur
- À chacun son enfer (1977) as Le père
- Mille milliards de dollars (1982) as Guérande
- Les Misérables (1982) as Gillenormand
