= They Are Twenty =

1950 film

- Directed by: René Delacroix
- Written by: René Delacroix
- Based on: They Are Twenty by Roger Ferdinand
- Produced by: Fred d' Orengiani
- Starring: Jacqueline Gauthier; Philippe Lemaire; François Patrice
- Cinematography: Jean Bachelet
- Edited by: André Brossier
- Music by: Paul Misraki
- Production company: F.A.O.
- Distributed by: Ciné Sélection
- Release date: 15 December 1950
- Running time: 88 minutes
- Country: France
- Language: French

They Are Twenty (French: Ils ont vingt ans) is a 1950 French comedy film directed by René Delacroix and starring Jacqueline Gauthier, Philippe Lemaire and François Patrice. The film's sets were designed by the art directors Roger Briaucourt and Louis Le Barbenchon. It is based on the 1948 play of the same title by Roger Ferdinand. It is a sequel to the 1946 film Les J3 which had been set in a school.

== Synopsis ==
The former school students are now attending university in Paris. They become intrigued by an adventurous woman who seems to be the exact double of their former teacher Mademoiselle Bravard.

== Cast ==
- Jacqueline Gauthier as Mlle Bravard & Anita
- Philippe Lemaire as Gabriel Lamy
- François Patrice as Lavallet
- Francis Blanche as Michel Barbarin
- Maurice Favières as Legros
- Nicolas Amato as Le serviteur
- Sandra Milovanoff as La mère d'Anita
- Félix Oudart as Monsieur Lamy
- Léon Pauléon as Le gros acteur
- André Versini Paturel
- Titys as Le régisseur

== Bibliography ==
- Goble, Alan. The Complete Index to Literary Sources in Film. Walter de Gruyter, 1999.
- Rège, Philippe. Encyclopedia of French Film Directors, Volume 1. Scarecrow Press, 2009.
