= Isabelle Is Afraid of Men =

1957 film

- Directed by: Jean Gourguet
- Written by: Jean Gourguet
- Produced by: Jeanne Saintenoy
- Starring: Cathia Caro; Roger Dumas; Michel François
- Cinematography: Scarciafico Hugo
- Edited by: Jeanne-Marie Favier
- Music by: José Cana
- Production company: Société Française de Production
- Distributed by: Héraut Film
- Release date: 30 October 1957
- Running time: 90 minutes
- Country: France
- Language: French

Isabelle Is Afraid of Men (French: Isabelle a peur des hommes) is a 1957 French drama film directed by Jean Gourguet and starring Cathia Caro, Roger Dumas and Michel François.

== Cast ==
- Cathia Caro as Isabelle
- Roger Dumas as Maxime Brissac
- Michel François as Yves
- Simone Paris as Tante Flora
- Junie Astor as Béarice, mère d'Isabelle
- Robert Vattier as M. Brissac
- Pierre Massimi as Didier
- Brigitte Briant as Nicole
- Gérard Fallec as Dodo
- Régine Lovi as Poussy
- Danièle Marescot
- Yves-Marie Maurin
- Solange Sicard as La grand-mère

== Bibliography ==
- Rège, Philippe. Encyclopedia of French Film Directors, Volume 1. Scarecrow Press, 2009.
