= Rendez-vous avec Maurice Chevalier n°3 =

- Directed by: Maurice Régamey
- Starring: Maurice Chevalier; Michèle Morgan; Jerry Mengo; Maurice Utrillo; Lucie Valore; Gilbert Bécaud
- Cinematography: Willy Faktorovitch; Jean Lehérissey
- Release date: 1957
- Running time: 21 minutes
- Country: France
- Language: French

Rendez-vous avec Maurice Chevalier n°3 is a French short film directed by Maurice Régamey in 1957.

== Synopsis ==
Maurice Chevalier visits several artists to discuss their work.

== Songs ==
- Rendez-vous à Paris (1954)
  - Music by Fred Freed
  - Lyrics by Maurice Chevalier
  - Performed by Maurice Chevalier
- Je veux te Dire Adieu (1954)
  - Music by Gilbert Bécaud
  - Lyrics by Charles Aznavour
  - Performed by Gilbert Bécaud
- Laissez Faire, Laissez Dire (1954)
  - Music by Gilbert Bécaud
  - Lyrics by Pierre Delanoë
  - Performed by Gilbert Bécaud
- Sur l'Avenue Foch (1950)
  - Music by Roger Lucchesi and Hubert Giraud
  - Lyrics by Roger Lucchesi and Maurice Chevalier
  - Performed by Maurice Chevalier
