= In Venice, One Night =

1937 film

- Italian poster
- Directed by: Christian-Jaque
- Written by: Paul Nivoix; Edmond Épardaud
- Produced by: Gilbert Renault-Decker
- Starring: Albert Préjean; Elvire Popesco; Roger Karl
- Cinematography: Marcel Lucien
- Edited by: William Barache
- Music by: Marcel Lattès
- Production company: Films Renault-Decker
- Distributed by: Les Films Osso; ENIC (Italy)
- Release date: 19 November 1937
- Running time: 86 minutes
- Country: France
- Language: French

In Venice, One Night (French: À Venise, une nuit) is a 1937 French comedy film directed by Christian-Jaque and starring Albert Préjean, Elvire Popesco and Roger Karl. It was made at the Cité Elgé studios in Paris. The film's sets were designed by the art director Pierre Schild. Location shooting took place in Nice and Venice.

== Synopsis ==
A wealthy man wishes to gain a divorce from his wife Nadia, so that he can marry an American woman. He hired a private detective Robert to seduce his wife and gain enough compromising evidence to secure the divorce. However Robert really falls in love with Nadia, and he turns the table on his employer by exposing him as a jewellery thief.

== Cast ==
- Albert Préjean as Robert - un détective
- Elvire Popesco as Nadia Mortal
- Marcel Mouloudji as Le jeune Toto
- Roger Karl as Mortal - le mari de Nadia
- Pauline Carton as La concierge
- Héléna Manson as Julie
- Régine Dancourt as La maharanée
- Anthony Gildès as Oms
- Marcelle Rexiane as la secrétaire de Monsieur Oms
- Henri Crémieux as Le témoin
- Georges Bever as L'huissier
- Marcel Maupi as Le barman
- Gaston Dupray as Le maître d'hôtel
- Lucien Callamand as Le portier
- Robert Ozanne as Le chauffeur de taxi
- Marcello Spada as Le chauffeur napolitain

== Bibliography ==
- Bessy, Maurice & Chirat, Raymond. Histoire du cinéma français: 1935-1939. Pygmalion, 1986.
- Crisp, Colin. Genre, Myth and Convention in the French Cinema, 1929-1939. Indiana University Press, 2002.
- Rège, Philippe. Encyclopedia of French Film Directors, Volume 1. Scarecrow Press, 2009.
