= The Duke's Gold =

1965 film

- Directed by: Jacques Baratier
- Written by: Jacques Baratier; Eric Ollivier
- Produced by: Georges Chappedelaine; Edmond Ténoudji
- Starring: Claude Rich; Pierre Brasseur; Elsa Martinelli; Danielle Darrieux
- Cinematography: Henri Raichi
- Edited by: Néna Baratier
- Music by: Michel Colombier
- Production companies: Cocinor; Fair Film; Les Films Marceau
- Distributed by: Cocinor
- Release date: 23 September 1965
- Running time: 90 minutes
- Countries: France; Italy
- Language: French

The Duke's Gold (French: L'or du duc) is a 1965 French-Italian comedy film directed by Jacques Baratier and starring Claude Rich, Pierre Brasseur, Elsa Martinelli and Danielle Darrieux. The film's sets were designed by the art director Jacques Gut.

== Cast ==
- Claude Rich as Ludovic de Talois-Minet
- Monique Tarbès as Monique de Talois-Minet
- Jacques Dufilho as Annibal
- Pierre Brasseur as Adhémar de Talois-Minet
- Elsa Martinelli as Sonia
- Danielle Darrieux as Marie-Gabrielle de M.
- Noël Roquevert as Le général de Bonneguerre
- Jean Tissier as Le bon Pleko
- Annie Cordy as La concierge
- Fernand Sardou as Le livreur d'eau
- Pierre Repp as Le vendeur de tissus
- Bénédicte Lacoste as Alix
- Dino Mele as L'amoureux d'Alix
- Roland Lesaffre as Le chauffeur de la RATP
- René-Jean Chauffard as L'académicien
- Catherine Darey as La belle-soeur de Ludovic
- Paul Demange as Un joueur
- Daniel Emilfork as Le gardien
- André Gabriello as Le bougnat
- Renée Gardès as La marchande de billets
- Jacques Jouanneau as Le casseur d'autos
- Christian Marin as Le gendarme
- Hubert de Lapparent as Le vrai comte du Tellac

== Bibliography ==
- Hartnoll, Gillian & Auty, Martyn. Water Under the Bridge: 25 Years of the London Film Festival. British Film Institute, 1981.
- Rège, Philippe. Encyclopedia of French Film Directors, Volume 1. Scarecrow Press, 2009.
- Armes, Roy. French Cinema Since 1946. Tantivy Press, 1970.
