= François Patrice =

French actor

- Born: 1 January 1924; Beirut, French Lebanon
- Died: 19 December 2018 (aged 94); Paris, France
- Other name: François Aubouard
- Occupation: Actor
- Years active: 1946-

François Patrice (1 January 1924 – 19 December 2018) was a French film and television actor.

== Selected filmography ==
- The Sea Rose (1946)
- Dilemma of Two Angels (1948)
- Three Boys, One Girl (1948)
- The Loves of Colette (1948)
- The White Squadron (1949)
- They Are Twenty (1950)
- Duel in Dakar (1951)
- Rue des Saussaies (1951)
- The Big Flag (1954)
- The Affair of the Poisons (1955)
- The Whole Town Accuses (1956)
- Tales of Paris (1962)
- Love in the Night (1968)

== Bibliography ==
- Goble, Alan. The Complete Index to Literary Sources in Film. Walter de Gruyter, 1999.
