= Rue des Saussaies (film) =

1951 film

- Directed by: Ralph Habib
- Written by: Raymond Antonini; Jacques Bloch-Morhange; Raymond Caillava; Ralph Habib
- Produced by: Adolphe Osso
- Starring: Anne Vernon; Maurice Régamey; Aimé Clariond
- Cinematography: Jean Bourgoin
- Edited by: Borys Lewin
- Music by: Bruno Coquatrix; Marc Lanjean
- Production company: Films Vendôme
- Distributed by: Columbia Film
- Release date: 23 March 1951
- Running time: 85 minutes
- Country: France
- Language: French

Rue des Saussaies is a 1951 French crime drama film directed by Ralph Habib and starring Anne Vernon, Maurice Régamey and Aimé Clariond. It takes its name from the Rue des Saussaies, a street in the 8th arrondissement of Paris. The film's sets were designed by the art director Paul Bertrand.

== Synopsis ==
After her brother is murdered by a gangster posing as a respectable citizen, a nightclub singer recruits the assistance of a police detective to help bring him and his associates to justice.

== Cast ==
- Anne Vernon as Jeanne Masson
- Maurice Régamey as L'inspecteur Pierre Leblanc
- Aimé Clariond as Cortedani
- René Blancard as L'inspecteur Martial
- Marc Valbel as Brasier
- Jean-Marc Tennberg as Dédé le fada
- François Patrice as Roger Masson
- Raymond Raynal as Raoul
- Pierre Sergeol as Albert
- Simone Michels as Gaby
- André Valmy as Le commissaire Didier
- Jo Dest as Un agent
- Pierre Goutas as Un gangster
- François Joux as Le docteur
- Jean-Jacques Lécot as Un gangster
- Marcel Melrac as Un inspecteur
- Robert Moor as Le chimiste
- Charles Vissières as Le témoin

== Bibliography ==
- Rège, Philippe. Encyclopedia of French Film Directors, Volume 1. Scarecrow Press, 2009.
