= Claude Orval =

French screenwriter and film director

- Born: 1 November 1897; Paris, France
- Died: 24 April 1963 (aged 65); Paris, France
- Other name: Jean Salomon Wallenstein
- Occupations: Writer, Director
- Years active: 1934-1953 (film)

Claude Orval (1897–1963) was a French screenwriter and film director.

== Selected filmography ==
- Clodoche (1938)
- Three Investigations (1948)
- Music in the Head (1951)
- Duel in Dakar (1951)
- Montmartre Nights (1955)

== Bibliography ==
- Philippe Rège. Encyclopedia of French Film Directors, Volume 1. Scarecrow Press, 2009.
