= Suzanne de Troeye =

French film editor

- Born: 3 March 1908; Vincennes, France
- Died: 6 July 1989 (aged 81); Paris, France
- Other name: Suzanne de Troye
- Occupation: Editor
- Years active: 1931-1963 (film)

Suzanne de Troeye (1908-1999) was a French film editor. She worked with directors such as Marcel Pagnol, Marc Allégret and Jean Renoir.

== Selected filmography ==
- Toni (1935)
- Merlusse (1935)
- César (1936)
- Harvest (1937)
- The Baker's Wife (1938)
- Heartbeat (1938)
- La Bête Humaine (1938)
- Portrait of Innocence (1941)
- The Man from London (1943)
- Strange Inheritance (1943)
- First on the Rope (1944)
- Girl with Grey Eyes (1945)
- Father Goriot (1945)
- Patrie (1946)
- The Loves of Colette (1948)
- Victor (1951)
- Julietta (1953)
- Lady Chatterley's Lover (1955)
- Love Is at Stake (1957)
- Girl on the Road (1962)
- Highway Pickup (1963)

== Bibliography ==
- Crisp, Colin. French Cinema—A Critical Filmography: Volume 1, 1929-1939. Indiana University Press, 2015.
