= Solo (1970 film) =

- Directed by: Jean-Pierre Mocky
- Screenplay by: Jean-Pierre Mocky; Alain Moury
- Story by: Jean-Pierre Mocky; Alain Moury
- Starring: Jean-Pierre Mocky
- Cinematography: Marcel Weiss
- Edited by: Marguerite Renoir
- Music by: Georges Moustaki
- Production companies: Balzac Films; Ciné Eclair; Société Nouvelle Ciné Vog; Showking Films
- Release date: February 27, 1970 (France)
- Running time: 83 minutes
- Countries: France; Belgium
- Budget: 630,000 francs

Solo is a 1970 film directed by Jean-Pierre Mocky. It is a French and Belgian co-production.

== Cast ==
- Jean-Pierre Mocky as Vincent Cabral
- Sylvie Bréal as Micheline
- Anne Deleuze as Annabel
- Denis Le Guillou as Virgile Cabral
- René-Jean Chauffard as the redhead
- Marcel Pérés as maitre d'hôtel
- Alain Fourès as Éric

== Production ==
Balzac Films is French and Belgian co-production between the Paris-based Balzac Films and Ciné Eclair and the Brussels-based Société Nouvelle Ciné Vog and Showking Films. The film 70% financed by the Paris companies and 30% funded by the Belgian companies. The film had a budget of 630,000 francs.

The film was director Jean-Pierre Mocky's first polar film. Mocky also performed as the lead in the film as Vincent Cabral, saying he was forty year old at the time but looked much younger and that "Young debutants, on the French film market were few. So, I still had my chance." The film was shot in 24 days in April 1969 in Paris, Brussels, Reims and Arras.

For the film's music, Mocky had his friend Georges Moustaki, the Greek musician compose it. Moustaki was initially set to score Mocky's directorial debut Les Dragueurs (1959).

== Release ==
The film went unreleased until the next year. Mocky would in that time accept the offer to direct another comedy with Bourvil, L'Étalon (1970) in order for it to be released. Solo was released in France on February 27, 1970, just a few weeks after the release of L'Étalon. Solo had 660,000 spectators in France, which was less than L'Étalon which had 1,300,000 spectators.

Solo was released was released on blu-ray in June 2026 by Radiance Films.

== Sources ==
- Curti, Roberto; Lafond, Frank (2026). French Thrillers of the 1970s: Volume I, Crime Films. Jefferson, North Carolina: McFarland & Company. ISBN 978-1-4766-8681-3. LCCN 2025048366.
- Hunt, Bill (March 11, 2026). "Warner Archive's April has George Stevens: A Filmmaker's Journey in 4K, plus Bill's on Tim Millard's The Extras Podcast!". The Digital Bits. Archived from the original on March 24, 2026.
