= The Captain (1946 film) =

1946 film

- Directed by: Robert Vernay
- Written by: Bernard Zimmer; Robert Vernay
- Based on: Le Capitan by Michel Zevaco
- Produced by: Édouard Harispuru
- Starring: Pierre Renoir; Claude Génia; Jean Pâqui
- Cinematography: Victor Arménise
- Edited by: Jeannette Berton
- Music by: Jean Wiener
- Production company: Compagnie Franco Coloniale Cinématographique
- Distributed by: Pathé
- Release date: 27 March 1946
- Running time: 98 minutes
- Country: France
- Language: French

The Captain (French: Le capitan) is a 1946 French historical adventure film directed by Robert Vernay and starring Pierre Renoir, Claude Génia, and Jean Pâqui. It was based on a novel by Michel Zévaco. The film's sets were designed by René Renoux. It is a swashbuckler set in the reign of Louis XIII.

== Cast ==
- Pierre Renoir as Le duc d'Angoulême
- Claude Génia as Gisèle d'Angoulême
- Jean Pâqui as Capestang
- Aimé Clariond as Concini
- Lise Delamare as Léonora Caligai
- Jean Tissier as Cogolin
- Maurice Escande as Le prince de Condé
- Sophie Desmarets as Marion Delorme
- Alexandre Rignault as Rinaldo
- Serge Emrich as Louis XIII
- Huguette Duflos as Marie de Medici
- Robert Manuel as Le comte Hercule de Nesle
- Lucas Gridoux as Samuel
- Georges Marny as Le cardinal de Richelieu
- Pierre Magnier as Le médecin du roi
- Sylvette Saugé as La camériste
- Gabrielle Robinne as La supérieure
- Françoise Moor as La reine
- Georges Pally as Sbire #1
- René Alié as Sbire #2
- Manuel Gary as Sbire #3
- Jean Marconi as Un gentilhomme
- Paul Faivre as L'aubergiste
- François Viguier as L'aumônier
- Maurice Schutz as Le vieux conseiller
- Armand Lurville as Le vieux banquier
- Edmond Beauchamp as Le procureur du roy
- Georges Bever as Un homme du peuple
- Marcel Carpentier as Gros-Guillaume
- Geo Forster as Un garde
- Palmyre Levasseur as Une femme du peuple
- Frédéric Mariotti as Un homme du peuple
- Franck Maurice as Un hallebardier

== Bibliography ==
- Dayna Oscherwitz & MaryEllen Higgins. The A to Z of French Cinema. Scarecrow Press, 2009.
