= Robert Vernay =

French director and screenwriter

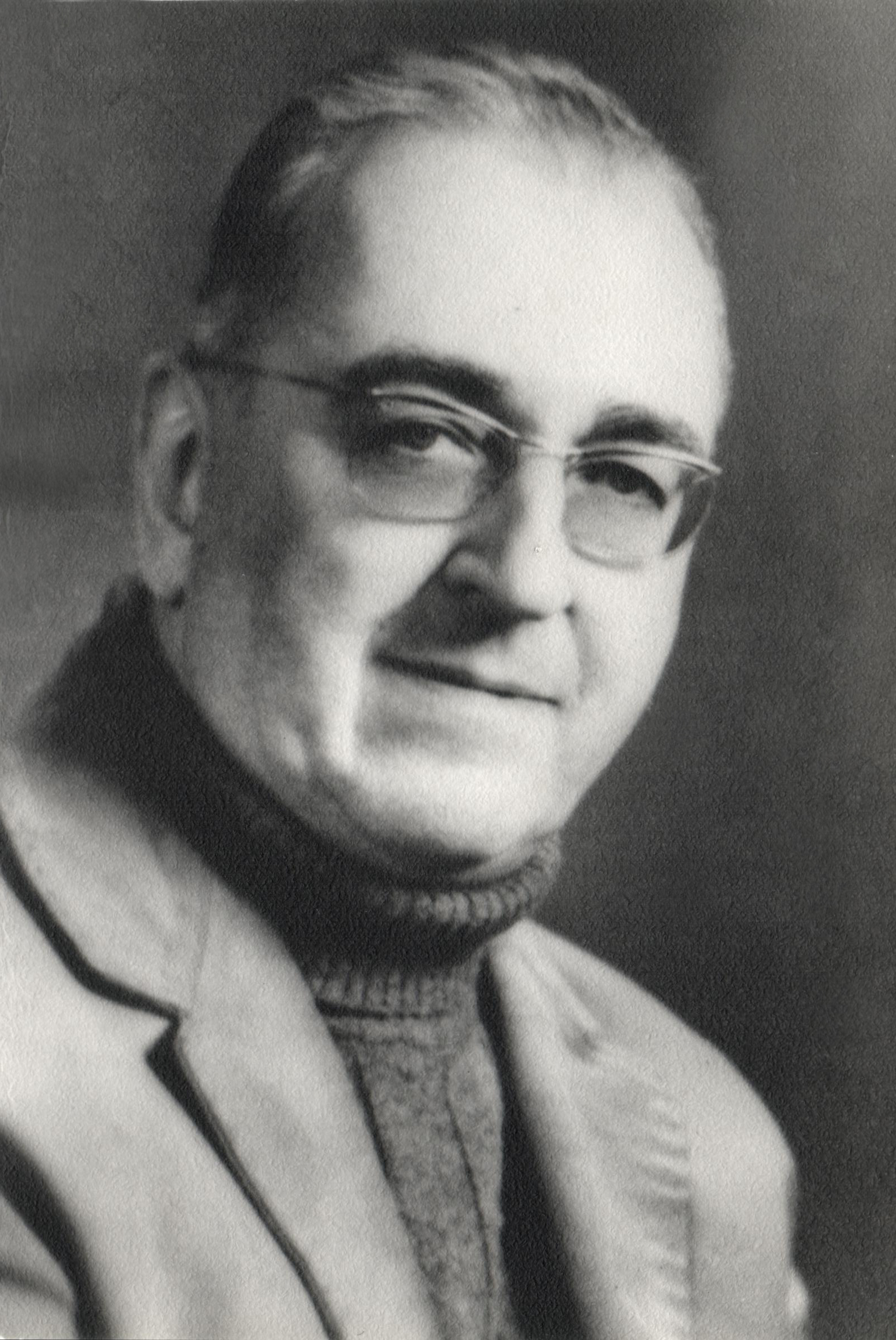
Robert Vernay in 1972

Robert Vernay (May 30, 1907 in Paris – October 17, 1979 in Paris) was a French director and screenwriter.

== Career ==
In 1937, Vernay worked as assistant director to Julien Duvivier on Pépé le Moko.

In 1944, Vernay directed an adaptation of Balzac's Père Goriot, starring Pierre Renoir. It was released in 1945. In the late 1950s, he directed a "tacky comedy" called Madame et son auto. It was a favourite film of René Magritte.

== Selected filmography ==
- Prince of the Six Days (1936)
- Pépé le Moko (1937) as assistant director
- The Woman I Loved Most (1942)
- Arlette and Love (1943)
- The Count of Monte Cristo (1943)
- Father Goriot (1945)
- The Captain (1946)
- Emile the African (1949)
- Fantomas Against Fantomas (1949)
- Véronique (1950)
- Andalusia (1951)
- The Dream of Andalusia (1951)
- Love in the Vineyard (1952)
- Double or Quits (1953)
- The Count of Monte Cristo (1954)
- Let's Be Daring, Madame (1957)
- Madame et son auto (1958)
- Monsieur Suzuki (1960)
