= Les J3 =

1946 film

Les J3 also known as The J3
- Directed by: Roger Richebé
- Written by: Jean Aurenche; Jean Ferry
- Starring: Gérard Nery; Gisèle Pascal; Saturnin Fabre
- Cinematography: Victor Arménise
- Edited by: Henri Taverna
- Music by: Henri Verdun
- Release date: 17 April 1946 (France)
- Running time: 85 minutes
- Country: France
- Language: French

Les J3 (also known as The J3) is a 1946 French film directed by Roger Richebé, and adapted from the play by the same name, written by Roger Ferdinand. The film's admissions in France were 2,748,441. It was followed by a 1950 sequel They Are Twenty.

== Plot synopsis ==
The play focuses on a group of high school students in occupied France during the Second World War. Whilst the students are initially more focused on the black market trade of cigarettes and stockings, a new philosophy teacher, the "charming and gifted educator" Mademoiselle Bravard, focuses them back onto their work at school, helping them all pass their final exams.

== Cast ==
- Gérard Nery as Gabriel Lamy
- Gisèle Pascal as Mademoiselle Bravard
- Saturnin Fabre as the school Headmaster
