= Lucien Blondeau =

French actor (1884–1965)

- Born: 10 March 1884; Paris, France
- Died: 11 August 1965 (aged 81); Paris, France
- Other name: Raymond Sébastien Girard
- Occupation: Actor
- Years active: 1910–1962 (film )

Lucien Blondeau (1884–1965) was a French stage, television and film actor.

== Selected filmography ==
- Marthe Richard (1937)
- First on the Rope (1944)
- Girl with Grey Eyes (1945)
- Son of France (1946)
- Extravagant Theodora (1950)
- Imperial Violets (1952)
- Crimson Curtain (1952)

== Bibliography ==
- Goble, Alan. The Complete Index to Literary Sources in Film. Walter de Gruyter, 1999.
