= Pierre Nord =

French writer, spy and resistance member

- Born: 15 April 1900; Le Cateau-Cambrésis, France
- Died: 10 December 1985 (aged 85); Monaco
- Occupation: Writer

Pierre Nord, real name André Léon Brouillard (15 April 1900 – 10 December 1985), was a French writer, spy, and resistance member.

== Early life ==
Brouillard was born in Le Cateau-Cambrésis, Nord. He participated in the First World War as a resistance fighter and in 1916 was arrested by the Germans at Saint-Quentin, Aisne, condemned to death, and later pardoned.

He was educated at Saint-Cyr (1920-1922), Ecole de Guerre (Superior War School) (1932-1934), and Ecole libre des sciences politiques (Free School of Political Science). As an armoured troops' officer, he took part in the campaign against Rif rebels in Morocco and there earned the distinction of knight of the Légion d'honneur.

In 1939, Brouillard was appointed chief of intelligence of the 9th and 10th Armies. During the German invasion of 1940, he was again captured, escaped and became commander of one of the most active units of the French resistance. He ended the Second World War as a colonel and was awarded numerous military decorations.

Brouillard published his first espionage novel, Double crime sur la ligne Maginot (Double Crime on the Maginot Line) in 1936, under the pseudonym of Pierre Nord. The tense and complicated plot revolved around the hunt for a murderous German spy who operated in one of the forts in the Maginot Line. The spy, masquerading as a lieutenant in the French army, was neutralized by an ingenious trap set by the Deuxième Bureau' operative Captain Pierre Ardant. (Curiously, the chief protagonists of Nord's novels almost invariably bear the first name of Pierre). The Double crime was followed by Terre d'angoisse (Land of Anguish) 1937, which described the struggle between the German and French secret services during the First World War. The hero of the story, under the alias of Lieutenant Heim (portrayed by actor Gabriel Gabrio in the 1939 film adaptation) penetrated the Kaiser's army.

== Post-war ==
In 1946, Brouillard left military service to take up writing full-time. As Pierre Nord, he became a prolific and popular author of spy fiction. His novels are characterized by realistic and intricate plots skillfully woven into both Cold War and Second World War settings. Many feature Colonel Dubois, the astute, veteran chief of French counter-espionage.

Sixième colonne (Sixth Column) 1955, deals with the ostensive defection to the East of a French bacteriologist and the search for him carried out by his brother, a lieutenant colonel in the medical service, Pierre Rocher. The threat of biological warfare is again addressed in Espionnage à l'italienne (Espionage a la Italian) 1963, where a French discoverer of a deadly bacillus disappears in Italy and is sought by the French, American and Russian intelligence services. In Pas de scandale a l'ONU (No Scandal at the UN) 1962, the son of a murdered French diplomat, trying to avenge the death of his father who worked for Colonel Dubois, stumbles upon a conspiracy against world peace orchestrated by some third world countries. In Le Kawass d'Ankara (The Kawass from Ankara) 1967, the Allied secret services in 1944 dispatched an agent, Pierre Frontin, to Turkey in a desperate effort to discredit vital information that fell into German hands. Le 13e suicidé (The Thirteenth Who Committed Suicide) 1971, features a high-ranking Russian defector who reveals that many leading figures in the West German intelligence service are in fact Soviet agents. When several of them take their own lives, Colonel Dubois begins to question the Russian's revelations. This novel was adapted into a film Le Serpent (Night Flight from Moscow) 1973 starring Yul Brynner, Henry Fonda and Dirk Bogarde. Le canal de las Americas (The Canal of the Americas, 1973) is a political intrigue set in the fictitious Latin American republic of Costaraguay. Altogether Nord authored nearly eighty novels.

He also wrote non-fiction. Between 1946 and 1949, Nord published a three-volume account of Free French intelligence actions during the Second World War under the title Mes Camarades sont morts (My Comrades are Dead), it won the Grand Prix Vérité. L'intoxication (The Deception), an analysis of the clandestine war of secret services, appeared in 1971.

In 1957, Nord moved from France to the principality of Monaco, where he lived until his death.

== Filmography ==
- Double crime sur la ligne Maginot, directed by Félix Gandéra (1937, based on the novel Double crime sur la ligne Maginot)
- Deuxième Bureau contre Kommandantur, directed by René Jayet and Robert Bibal (1939, based on the novel Terre d'angoisse)
- Resistance, directed by André Berthomieu (1945, based on the novel Peloton d'exécution)
- Captain Ardant, directed by André Zwoboda (1951, based on the novel Le Capitaine Ardant)
- Rhine Virgin, directed by Gilles Grangier (1953, based on the novel La Vierge du Rhin)
- The Amorous Corporal, directed by Robert Darène (1958, based on the novel La Bigorne, caporal de France)
- Night Flight from Moscow, directed by Henri Verneuil (1973, based on the novel Le Treizième Suicidé)
