= Maria Vincent =

French actress and singer

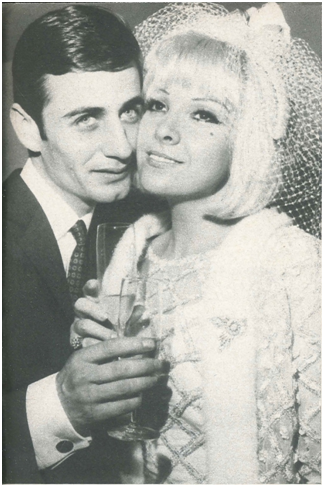
- Wedding photograph of Maria Vincent and French couturier Léo Marciano
- Born: 23 October 1929; Marseille, Bouches-du-Rhône, France
- Died: 28 August 2006 (aged 76); Paris, Ile-de-France, France
- Occupation(s): Singer, actress

Maria Vincent (23 October 1929 – 28 August 2006) was a French film actress and singer.

== Biography ==
Maria Vincent was born on 23 October 1929 in Marseille, Bouches-du-Rhône, France. She was married to Léo Marciano. She was known for her roles in the films Interpol Against X (1960), Secret of the Chinese Carnation (1964), and Hotel Clausewitz (1967).

Vincent died in Paris on 28 August 2006. She's the grandmother of Paola Dicelli, journalist in Elle Magazine France.

== Selected filmography ==
- Interpol Against X (1960)
- There Is Still Room in Hell (1961)
- The Secret of the Chinese Carnation (1964)
- Hotel Clausewitz (1967)
