= Riccioni =

Riccioni is an Italian surname. Notable people with the surname include:

- Enzo Riccioni (died 1964), Italian cinematographer
- Marco Riccioni (born 1997), Italian rugby union player

== See also ==
- Riccione
