= False Identity =

False Identity may refer to:

- False identity
- False Identity (1990 film), an American crime thriller film
- False Identity (1947 film), a French crime film
