= Secret Cargo =

1947 film

- Directed by: Alfred Rode
- Written by: Yvan Noé; Alfred Rode
- Produced by: Alfred Rode
- Starring: Luis Mariano; Käthe von Nagy; Claudine Dupuis
- Cinematography: Enzo Riccioni
- Music by: Joe Hajos; Alfred Rode
- Production company: Phoebus International
- Distributed by: Les Films Cristal
- Release date: 27 December 1947
- Running time: 90 minutes
- Country: France
- Language: French

Secret Cargo (French: Cargaison clandestine) is a 1947 French drama film directed by Alfred Rode and starring Luis Mariano, Käthe von Nagy and Claudine Dupuis. It was shot at the Boulogne Studios in Paris. The film's sets were designed by the art director Emile Alex.

== Synopsis ==
In a shady Central American nightclub a travelling gypsy orchestra get unwittingly mixed up in the drug trafficking activities of its owners.

== Cast ==
- Luis Mariano as José
- Käthe von Nagy as Luisa Heim
- Claudine Dupuis as Mila
- Jean-Jacques Delbo as Carlos Mendoza
- Junie Astor as Mme Mendoza
- Pierre Renoir as Le préfet de police
- Alfred Rode as Ricardo Mendi
- Paul Amiot as Le gouverneur
- Michel Ardan
- Lucas Gridoux as N'Goué, le restaurateur chinois
- Jacqueline Ricard
- J.J. Telbos
- Jean Témerson

== Bibliography ==
- Berthomé, Jean-Pierre & Naizet, Gaël. Bretagne et cinéma: cent ans de création cinématographique en Bretagne. Cinémathèque de Bretagne, 1995.
- Bock, Hans-Michael and Bergfelder, Tim. The Concise Cinegraph: An Encyclopedia of German Cinema. Berghahn Books.
