= Prostitution (1963 film) =

- Directed by: Maurice Boutel
- Written by: Maurice Boutel; Marcel Sicot
- Produced by: Maurice Boutel
- Starring: Etchika Choureau; Evelyne Dassas; Alain Lionel
- Cinematography: Quinto Albicocco; Paul Fabian; Jacques Mercanton; Enzo Riccioni
- Edited by: Etiennette Muse
- Music by: Roger-Roger
- Production company: Cocifrance
- Release date: 22 March 1963
- Running time: 115 minutes
- Country: France
- Language: French

Prostitution (French: La prostitution) is a 1963 French drama film directed by Maurice Boutel and starring Etchika Choureau, Evelyne Dassas and Alain Lionel.

== Cast ==
- Etchika Choureau as Olga
- Evelyne Dassas as Irene
- Alain Lionel as Mario
- Alicia Gutiérrez as Concepçión
- Anne Darden as Martha
- Rita Cadillac as Rita
- Gabrielle Robinne as Honorine
- Victor Guyau as Pauwels
- Robert Dalban as Robert
- Carl Eich as Franck
- Raúl Dantés as Joaquin
- Hinsing Chow as Bangchow
- Jacques Devos in a bit part

== Bibliography ==
- Philippe Rège. Encyclopedia of French Film Directors, Volume 1. Scarecrow Press, 2009.
