= Lucas Gridoux =

- Born: Leiba Grimberg; 16 April 1896; Herța, Kingdom of Romania
- Died: 22 April 1952 (aged 56); Paris, France
- Resting place: Père Lachaise Cemetery, Paris
- Occupation: Actor
- Years active: 1931–1951 (film)

Lucas Gridoux (16 April 1896 – 22 April 1952) was a Romanian-born French stage and film actor.

== Biography ==
He was born in 1896 in Herța, at the time in Dorohoi County, Kingdom of Romania. After emigrating to France, Gridoux began his film career in 1931, playing mainly in roles of traitors. In 1935, he was Judas in Julien Duvivier's Golgotha, and then in 1937, Inspector Slimane, the friendly policeman who finally arrests Jean Gabin in Pépé le Moko, by the same director.

He died in 1952 at the Pitié-Salpêtrière Hospital in Paris, and was buried at the city's Père Lachaise Cemetery.

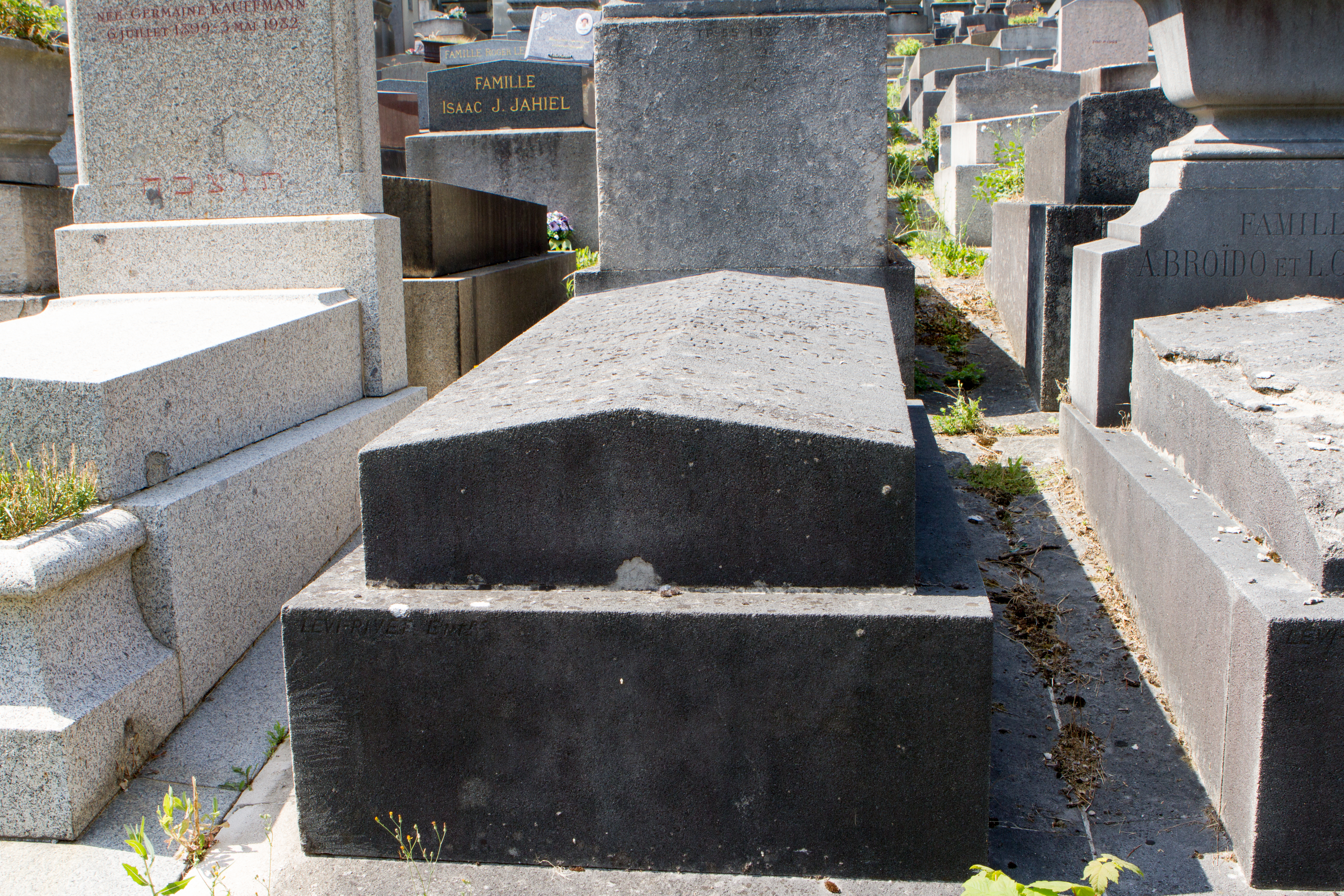
Tomb of Gridoux at Père Lachaise Cemetery

== Selected filmography ==
- American Love (1931)
- Golgotha (1935)
- The Mutiny of the Elsinore (1936)
- Pépé le Moko (1937)
- The Cheat (1937)
- The Citadel of Silence (1937)
- Balthazar (1937)
- Beethoven's Great Love (1937)
- The Men Without Names (1937)
- Storm Over Asia (1938)
- Rail Pirates (1938)
- Tamara (1938)
- The Path of Honour (1939)
- The Queen's Necklace (1946)
- The Captain (1946)
- Panic (Panique) (1947)
- Secret Cargo (1947)
- The Scarlet Bazaar (1947)
- Dilemma of Two Angels (1948)
- Oriental Port (1950)
- The Case of Doctor Galloy (1951)
- The Billionaire Tramp (1951)

== Bibliography ==
- Lanzoni, Rémi Fournier. French Cinema: From its Beginnings to the Present. Continuum, 2004.
