= Eugène Tucherer =

- Born: 24 September 1899; Kellemessebesirétek, Saros, Austro-Hungarian Empire
- Died: 17 August 1974 (aged 74); Paris, France
- Occupation: Producer
- Years active: 1925-1974 (film)

Eugène Tucherer (1899–1974) was a film producer. He was born in the Austro-Hungarian Empire but settled and worked in France for much of his career.

== Selected filmography ==
- Gold in the Street (1934)
- Chaste Susanne (1937)
- The Girl in the Taxi (1937)
- The Train for Venice (1938)
- Crossroads (1938)
- Sarajevo (1940)
- Star Without Light (1946)
- Dilemma of Two Angels (1948)
- House on the Waterfront (1955)
- Vice Squad (1959)
- The Cat Shows Her Claws (1960)
- Girl on the Road (1962)
- The Dirty Game (1965)

== Bibliography ==
- Hayward, Susan. Simone Signoret: The Star as Cultural Sign. A&C Black, 2004.
