= Monsieur Octave =

- Directed by: Maurice Boutel
- Written by: Maurice Boutel
- Starring: Pierre Larquey; Marcel Pérès; Mady Berry
- Cinematography: Pierre Petit
- Production company: Compagnie Parisienne Cinématographique
- Distributed by: Compagnie Parisienne Cinématographique
- Release date: 1951
- Country: France
- Language: French

Monsieur Octave is a 1951 French comedy film directed by Maurice Boutel and starring Pierre Larquey, Marcel Pérès and Mady Berry. A recently retired railway worker borrows money to build a new house.

== Cast ==
- Pierre Larquey as Monsieur Octave
- Paul Azaïs
- Mady Berry
- Georges Bever
- Raymond Cordy
- Léonce Corne
- Irène de Trebert
- Édouard Delmont
- Juliette Faber
- Grégoire Gromoff
- René Génin
- Yvonne Hébert
- Maximilienne
- Gaston Modot
- Marguerite Pierry
- Marcel Pérès
- Guy Saint-Clair
- Louis Seigner
- Robert Seller

== Bibliography ==
- Maurice Bessy, André Bernard & Raymond Chirat. Histoire du cinéma français: 1951-1955. Pygmalion, 1989.
