= Scandal in Montmartre =

1955 film

- Directed by: Alfred Rode
- Written by: Jacques Companéez; Louis Martin
- Produced by: Alfred Rode
- Starring: Claudine Dupuis; Philippe Nicaud; Dany Carrel
- Cinematography: Marc Fossard
- Edited by: Louisette Hautecoeur
- Music by: Roger Roger
- Production company: S.F.F.A.R.
- Distributed by: Les Artistes Associés
- Release date: 29 November 1955
- Running time: 100 minutes
- Country: France
- Language: French

Scandal in Montmartre (French: La môme Pigalle) is a 1955 French crime drama film directed by Alfred Rode and starring Claudine Dupuis, Philippe Nicaud and Dany Carrel. It was shot at the Boulogne Studios in Paris and location shooting around Montmartre including the Place Pigalle. The film's sets were designed by the art director Robert Bouladoux.

== Cast ==
- Claudine Dupuis as Arlette Sidon dite La Môme Pigalle
- Philippe Nicaud as Philippe-Gérard Maurisset
- Dany Carrel as Marie-Claude
- Jean Gaven as Félix Michaux
- Jean Brochard as Le commissaire Alphandri
- Jacques Morel as Monsieur Maugeat
- Robert Berri as Monsieur Jo - un client d'Albert
- Claude Godard as Sonia
- Jacqueline Noëlle as Bigoudi
- Colette Brumaire as Jeanine
- José López as Lui-même - un danseur
- Frédéric Rey a sLui-même - un danseur
- Noëlle Alex as Elle-même - une danseuse
- Jean Tissier as Albert - le patron de la boîte de nuit
- Dora Doll as Catherine
- Julien Carette as Le portier de l'Arc en Ciel

== Bibliography ==
- Palmer, Tim. Tales of the Underworld: Jean-Pierre Melville and the 1950s French Cinema. University of Wisconsin, 2003.
- Rège, Philippe. Encyclopedia of French Film Directors, Volume 1. Scarecrow Press, 2009.
