= Vice Squad (1959 film) =

- Directed by: Maurice Boutel
- Written by: Maurice Boutel; Marcel Sicot
- Produced by: Eugène Tucherer
- Starring: Eddie Barclay; Colette Ripert; Michel Beaufort
- Cinematography: Enzo Riccioni
- Edited by: Etiennette Muse
- Music by: Eddie Barclay
- Production companies: Cocifrance; Élysée Films
- Distributed by: Élysée Films
- Release date: 18 March 1959
- Running time: 106 minutes
- Country: France
- Language: French

Vice Squad (French: Brigade des moeurs) is a 1959 French crime film directed by Maurice Boutel and starring Eddie Barclay, Colette Ripert and Michel Beaufort.

== Partial cast ==
- Eddie Barclay as Le chef d'orchestre
- Colette Ripert as Irène
- Michel Beaufort as Le journaliste
- Jean Tissier as Clovis
- Dalida as herself / Elle-même
- Fernand Sardou as Le commissaire Masson
- Pauline Carton as La 'marieuse'
- Pierre Moncorbier
- Vera Valois
- Henri-Marceau
- Philippe Thomas
- Pierre Cap
- Louis Roman
- Teddy Jeffries
- Linda Roméo

== Bibliography ==
- Philippe Rège. Encyclopedia of French Film Directors, Volume 1. Scarecrow Press, 2009.
