= Interpol Against X =

- Directed by: Maurice Boutel
- Written by: Maurice Boutel
- Produced by: Maurice Boutel
- Starring: Howard Vernon; Maria Vincent; Andrex
- Cinematography: Enzo Riccioni
- Edited by: Denise Charvein
- Music by: Philippe Parès; Roger-Roger
- Production company: Procinor
- Distributed by: Universal Films
- Release date: 25 November 1960
- Running time: 84 minutes
- Country: France
- Language: French

Interpol Against X (French: Interpol contre X) is a 1960 French crime film directed by Maurice Boutel and starring Howard Vernon, Maria Vincent and Andrex. It is also known by the alternative title of Dossier AST-555.

== Cast ==
- Howard Vernon as L'inspecteur Jackson
- Maria Vincent as Madeleine
- Andrex as Mathias
- Junie Astor as Magda
- Marcel Pérès as Victor Belloy
- Joëlle Bernard as Lucy
- Pauline Carton as Louise Belloy
- Frédéric O'Brady as Mike
- Robert Dalban as Commissaire Meunier
- Roland Bailly as Chando
- Georges Bever as Le gardien de la morgue
- Fernand Rauzéna as Commissaire Masson
- Jacques Bourgeois
- Ronald Bell
- Edgar Duvivier
- Paul Grandjean
- Robert Lassus
- Pierre Moncorbier
- Habib Mustapha as Le contact à Istanbul
- Marcel Duhamel
- Michel Garland
- Fernand Kindt

== Bibliography ==
- Philippe Rège. Encyclopedia of French Film Directors, Volume 1. Scarecrow Press, 2009.
