= On Murder Considered as One of the Fine Arts (film) =

- Directed by: Maurice Boutel
- Release date: 1964
- Country: France
- Language: French

On Murder Considered as One of the Fine Arts (French: De l'assassinat considéré comme un des beaux-arts) is a 1964 French film directed by Maurice Boutel. It was not cinematically released. It takes its name from Thomas De Quincey's essay On Murder Considered as one of the Fine Arts.

== Cast ==
- Béatrice Altariba
- Edmond Ardisson
- Zisca Baum
- Rod Calvert
- Léonce Corne
- Bernard Dhéran as Président des rédempteurs de l'assassinat
- Colin Drake
- Robert Favart
- Grégoire Gromoff
- Jean Horwath
- Jacqueline Huet as Lady Manton
- Charles Moulin
- Virginia Rodin
- Anthony Stuart as Président des gentlemen amateurs
- Howard Vernon

== Bibliography ==
- Philippe Rège. Encyclopedia of French Film Directors, Volume 1. Scarecrow Press, 2009.
