= Nightclub (film) =

1951 film

- Directed by: Alfred Rode
- Written by: Henri Decoin; Marcel Rivet; Alfred Rode
- Produced by: Alfred Rode
- Starring: Alfred Rode; Claudine Dupuis; Louis Seigner; Junie Astor
- Cinematography: Enzo Riccioni
- Edited by: André Brossier
- Music by: Rolf Marbot; Alfred Rode; Eddie Warner
- Production company: Société de Films Français Alfred Rode
- Distributed by: Consortium du Film
- Release date: 20 July 1951
- Running time: 90 minutes
- Country: France
- Language: French

Nightclub (French: Boîte de nuit) is a 1951 French musical crime film directed by Alfred Rode and starring Rode, Claudine Dupuis, Louis Seigner and Junie Astor. The film's sets were designed by the art director Emile Alex.

== Synopsis ==
In a Paris nightclub, various disputes amongst the performers rise to the surface when a man's body is discovered.

== Cast ==
- Claudine Dupuis as Gina la vedette
- Alfred Rode as Vidmar Valdesco
- Pierre-Louis as L'inspecteur Garnier
- Saint-Granier as Roland
- Junie Astor as Evelyne
- Jane Marken as Irma
- Anouk Ferjac as Jackie
- Louis Seigner as Constanzo / Boris Armanian
- Howard Vernon as Charles
- Marcel Pérès as Un inspecteur
- Maurice Régamey as Lombard
- Roland Léonard as Mario
- Mag-Avril as Esther
- Monique Maine as La vendeuse de cigarettes
- Marcel Melrac as Le chauffeur
- Xénia Monty as Régine
- Gaston Orbal as Le baron
- Françoise Lauby as Simone
- Gérard Darrieu as Le groom
- Guy Derlan as Victor
- Raymonde Devarennes as Julia Constanzo

== Bibliography ==
- Powrie, Phil & Cadalanu, Marie . The French Film Musical. Bloomsbury Publishing, 2020.
- Rège, Philippe. Encyclopedia of French Film Directors, Volume 1. Scarecrow Press, 2009.
