= Hubert Noël =

French film actor (1924–1987)

- Born: 22 July 1924; Le Havre, France
- Died: 2 December 1987 (aged 63); Paris, France
- Occupation: Actor
- Years active: 1949–1988 (film & TV)

Hubert Noël (1924–1987) was a French film actor.

== Biography ==
A student at the Cours Simon, he made his theatrical debut with Charles Dullin in L'Avare, then moved on to the Centre Dramatique de l'Est, the Théâtre du Vieux-Colombier and the Théâtre du Gymnase, with prestigious partners such as Marie Bell.

=== Career ===
An actor with a pleasing physique, he played secondary roles in films, often not very rewarding, as troubled, self-interested characters or superficial, fickle lovers. He played Philippe de Nevers in André Hunebelle's Le Bossu in 1959, Danielle Darrieux's lover in Julien Duvivier's Le Diable et les Dix Commandements in 1962, Marina Vlady's lover in Christian-Jaque's Les Bonnes Causes and Dany Carrel's lover in André Cayatte's Piège pour Cendrillon in 1965. From the 1970s onwards, he only appeared in third roles, such as a bank clerk in Nicolas Gessner's La Petite Fille au bout du chemin in 1976.

He specialized in dubbing, lending his voice to Tony Curtis, Elvis Presley and Gardner McKay in the TV series Aventures dans les îles, broadcast by Radiodiffusion-télévision française from February 11, 1961.

== Partial filmography ==
- Forbidden to the Public (1949) - Bernard
- Darling Caroline (1951) - L'ami de Sallanches (uncredited)
- Monsieur Fabre (1951) - Le fiancé d'Antonia
- Crimson Curtain (1952)
- The Earrings of Madame de... (1953) - Henri de Maleville
- Le Chevalier de la nuit (1953) - L'amoureux
- Royal Affairs in Versailles (1954) - Un jeune seigneur (uncredited)
- The Secret of Helene Marimon (1954) - Un soldat
- The Red and the Black (1954)
- If Paris Were Told to Us (1956) - Un passant
- Marie Antoinette Queen of France (1956) - Un ami de Fersen (uncredited)
- La Traversée de Paris (1956) - Le gigolo arrêté (uncredited)
- Nathalie (1957) - Serge Lambert
- A Tale of Two Cities (1958 film)(1958) - Border Guard
- That Night (1958) - Gérald Martin
- Le Bossu (1959) - Philippe de Nevers
- Magnificent Sinner (1959) - Michel Dolgorouki
- Le bel âge (1960) - Hubert
- The Enemy General (1960) - Claude
- Coctail party (1960) - Pierre
- Boulevard (1960) - Le maquereau
- La morte-saison des amours (1961) - Hubert
- Le Miracle des loups (1961) - Narrator (uncredited)
- Famous Love Affairs (1961) - Eric (segment "Agnès Bernauer")
- The Devil and the Ten Commandments (1962) - L'amant de Clarisse (segment "Tes père et mère honoreras")
- Don't Tempt the Devil (1963) - L'amant de Catherine
- Devils of Darkness (1965) - Count Sinistre aka Armond du Molier
- Un mari à prix fixe (1965) - Norbert Besson
- Trap for Cinderella (1965) - François
- The Man from Interpol (1966) - Alec Suller
- Triple Cross (1966) - Von Runstedt's Aide de Camp
- The Little Girl Who Lives Down the Lane (1976) - Bank Clerk
- The Late Blossom (Le soleil se lève en retard) (1977)
- Cathy's Curse (1977) - Le docteur
- Panic (Panique) (1977)
- The Gypsy Warriors (1978) - Henry Deseau
- Madame Claude 2 (1981) - Gérald
- Les Misérables (1982) - Lafayette
- Stress (1984) - Client blessé
- American Dreamer (1984) - Doctor At Nightclub

== Bibliography ==
- Brian McFarlane. Lance Comfort. Manchester University Press, 1999.
