= The Blue Danube (1940 film) =

1940 French film

- Directed by: Emil E. Reinert; Alfred Rode
- Written by: Gérard Carlier; Yvan Noé; Emil E. Reinert
- Produced by: Alfred Rode
- Starring: Madeleine Sologne; José Noguéro; Marguerite Moreno
- Cinematography: Enzo Riccioni
- Edited by: Suzanne Bon
- Music by: Joe Hajos
- Production company: Films Alfred Rodea
- Distributed by: Societe d'Edition et de Location de Films
- Release date: 20 March 1940
- Running time: 84 minutes
- Country: France
- Language: French

The Blue Danube (French: Le Danube bleu) is a 1940 French drama film directed by Emil E. Reinert and Alfred Rode and starring Madeleine Sologne, José Noguéro and Marguerite Moreno. The film's sets were designed by the art director Émile Duquesne. Rode had produced a previous version of the film featuring Conchita Montenegro and Thomy Bourdelle but the negative of this was damaged during a March 1939 fire at the LTC laboratories in Paris and had to be re-shot with a different cast.

== Synopsis ==
The attractive Anika is courted both by fellow gypsy Sandor and by the wealthy Féry. When the latter is found murdered, Sandor is chief suspect and its arrested. With the assistance of the fortune teller Maria, Anika sets out to find the truth about the matter.

== Cast ==
- Madeleine Sologne as Anika
- José Noguéro as Sandor
- Marguerite Moreno as Maria, la cartomancienne
- Jean Galland as Rakos
- Simone Héliard as Ilona
- Zita Fiore as Zita - La chanteuse
- Allain Dhurtal as Joska
- Raymond Segard as Féry
- Jean Témerson as Alexander
- Alfred Rode as Imre
- Claude Roy as Le petit garçon

== Bibliography ==
- Crisp, Colin. Genre, Myth and Convention in the French Cinema, 1929-1939. Indiana University Press, 2002.
