= Until the Last One =

1957 film

- Directed by: Pierre Billon
- Written by: Pierre Billon; Michel Audiard
- Based on: Until the Last One by André Duquesne
- Produced by: Edmond Ténoudji
- Starring: Raymond Pellegrin; Jeanne Moreau; Paul Meurisse
- Cinematography: Pierre Petit
- Edited by: Georges Arnstam
- Music by: Georges Van Parys
- Production companies: Laetitia Film; Les Films Marceau
- Distributed by: Les Films Marceau
- Release date: 20 March 1957
- Running time: 90 minutes
- Countries: France; Italy
- Language: French

Until the Last One (French: Jusqu'au dernier, Italian: Fino all'ultimo) is a 1957 French-Italian thriller film directed by Pierre Billon and starring Raymond Pellegrin, Jeanne Moreau and Paul Meurisse. It was shot at the Photosonor Studios in Paris and on location around the River Somme. The film's sets were designed by the art director Jean d'Eaubonne. A film noir, it attracted around a million and a quarter spectators at the French box office.

== Synopsis ==
Criminal Fernand Bastia rats on the rest of his gang, betraying them to the police and escaping with the proceeds of the heist. He goes to hide out with a travelling circus where his sister works, but is traced by his former associates.

== Cast ==
- Raymond Pellegrin as Fernand Bastia
- Jeanne Moreau as Gina
- Paul Meurisse as Fredo Ricioni - le chef de la bande
- Max Révol as Cinquo - le propriétaire du cirque
- Jacqueline Noëlle as Angèle Lombardi
- Jacques Dufilho as Pépé
- Orane Demazis as La mère de Quedchi
- Rita Cadillac as La strip-teaseuse du cirque
- Michèle David as La fille et partenaire de Dario
- Charles Bouillaud as Un gendarme
- Olivier Richard as Le petit garçon au chien
- Mijanou Bardot as Josiane - l'écuyère
- Lila Kedrova as Marcella Bastia
- Howard Vernon as Philippe Dario - le trapéziste
- Marcel Mouloudji as Le forain Quedchi

== Bibliography ==
- Goble, Alan. The Complete Index to Literary Sources in Film. Walter de Gruyter, 1999.
- Walker-Morrison, Deborah. Classic French Noir: Gender and the Cinema of Fatal Desire. Bloomsbury Publishing, 2020.
