= Etchika Choureau =

French actress (1929–2022)

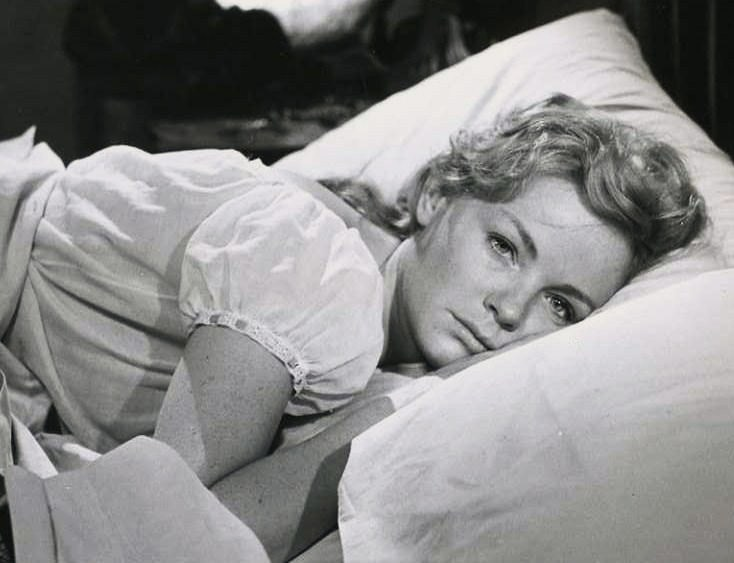
- Choureau in Darby's Rangers (1958)
- Born: 12 November 1929; Paris, France
- Died: 25 January 2022 (aged 92); Rabat, Morocco
- Other name: Jeannine Paulette Verret
- Occupation: Actress
- Years active: 1953–1966 (film)
- Spouses: Max Choureau (m. 1948; div. 1953); Philippe Rheims (m. 1968)
- Partner: Prince Moulay Hassan (1956–1961)

Etchika Choureau, born Jeaninne Paulette Verret (12 November 1929 – 25 January 2022), was a French film actress, active from 1953 to 1966. She remained in the spotlight thereafter for her continued friendship with her former lover, King Hassan II of Morocco.

== Career ==
Choureau's first feature film was The Other Side of Paradise, in 1953. Over her short career, she appeared in 17 feature films, and one TV movie, before retiring in 1966.

== Personal life ==
She was born Jeaninne Paulette Verret, in Paris, France. Her first husband was Max Choureau. The couple had been divorced for some time when she met Prince Moulay Hassan in 1956, who was then heir to the Moroccan throne. The couple entered a relationship until February 1961, when Hassan succeeded his father as king; Hassan's culture, and his royal responsibilities, required him to break up with the foreign, Christian and divorced Choureau and marry a Muslim Moroccan—marrying Lalla Latifa in November 1961. Choureau and Hassan remained close lifelong friends, and their friendship extended to her second husband, Philippe Rheims, whom she married in 1968 in Cassis.

While filming Lafayette Escadrille, Choureau grew very close to her costar Tab Hunter. Their relationship became serious enough that they almost got married. However Tab backed out after he decided that, as a closeted gay man, being married to a woman would be unfair to her and wouldn't be fulfilling to him.

Choureau died on 25 January 2022, at the age of 92.

== Filmography ==
Year	Title	Role
1953	The Other Side of Paradise	Violaine Roumégoux
1953	I Vinti	Simone
1953	Children of Love	Anne-Marie et Geneviève
1954	Les Intrigantes	Marie
1954	Service Entrance	Marie-Lou
1954	A Girl from Paris	
1955	Fruits of Summer	Juliette Gravières
1955	L'impossible Monsieur Pipelet	Jacqueline Martin
1956	Tides of Passion	Ludvine
1956	The Whole Town Accuses	Catherine Aravitte
1956	Les lumières du soir	Catherine Hessler
1957	I colpevoli	Sandra
1958	Darby's Rangers	Angelina De Lotta / Dittmann
1958	Lafayette Escadrille	Renée Beaulieu
1963	Prostitution	Olga
1964	Angélique, Marquise des Anges	Hortense de Sancé de Monteloup
1966	Paris in August	Simone Plantin
