= Pierre Petit (cinematographer) =

French cinematographer

Pierre Camille Petit (French: [pjɛʁ pəti]; 3 January 1920 – 22 September 1997) was a French cinematographer.

== Life ==
Petit was born in Fontenay-Trésigny. He began his career at the age of 16½ years as a camera assistant. During the Second World War, he was also active as a cameraman. Among his teachers were Léonce-Henri Burel, Eugen Schüfftan, Jean Bachelet, Joseph-Louis Mundwiller and André Dantan.

Shortly after the war ended, Petit debuted as a director of photography; over the course of in the next two and a half decades he became one of the most representative cinematographers working in French cinema (he also worked on a few foreign films). The films Petit photographed were almost continuously purely commercial productions to entertain the masses. He photographed many historical dramas, gangster films, and adventure films, and occasionally comedies. He worked with the directors Denys de La Patellière, Ralph Habib, Maurice Labro, Guy Lefranc, Pierre Billon and Georges Combret.

In the 60s, he worked on several agent and spy thrillers. Pierre Petit worked now more frequently with the A film director Christian-Jaque, for whom he shot the sprawling historical costume drama production Emma Hamilton, and the movie star Jean Marais. During the early 1970s, Petit largely moved back from the cinema and devoted himself to the television.

He retired in the early 1990s. He died in Rueil-Malmaison in 1997.

== Filmography ==
- False Identity (1947)
- Les gosses mènent l’enquête (1947)
- La passagère (1948)
- Sweet Madness (1951)
- The Case of Doctor Galloy (1951)
- Monsieur Octave (1951)
- Duel in Dakar (1951)
- Music in the Head (1951)
- Farewell Paris (1952)
- The Crime of Bouif (1952)
- La pocharde (1952)
- The Tour of the Grand Dukes (1953)
- The Fighting Drummer (1953)
- Koenigsmark (1953)
- La Castiglione (1954)
- The Pirates of the Bois de Boulogne (1954)
- Rasputin (1954)
- Men in White (1955)
- La Bande à papa (1955)
- Les aristocrates (1955)
- Law of the Streets (1956)
- Women's Club (1956)
- Until the Last One (1957)
- A Friend of the Family (1957)
- Escapade (1957)
- Clara et les méchantes (1957)
- The Wheel (1957)
- The Ostrich Has Two Eggs (1957)
- The Tricyclist (1957)
- Ça n’arrive qu’aux vivants (1958)
- Ce corps tant désire (1958)
- Le fauve est lâché (1958)
- Y en à marre (1958)
- Marie of the Isles (1959)
- La nuit des traqués (1959)
- Eyes of Love (1959)
- Tendre et violente Élisabeth (1960)
- The Nabob Affair (1960)
- Le pavé de Paris (1960)
- Fortunat (1960)
- L’assassin est dans l’annuaire (1961)
- All the Gold in the World (1961)
- The Dance (1962)
- Arsène Lupin Versus Arsène Lupin (1962)
- Le Masque de fer (1962)
- Les femmes d’abord (1962)
- Mort, où est ta victoire? (1963)
- Coplan Takes Risks (1964)
- Champagne for Savages (1964)
- The Dirty Game (1965)
- The Man from Cocody (1965)
- Mission to Caracas (1965)
- Circus Angel (1965)
- The Second Twin (1966)
- The Saint Lies in Wait (1966)
- Dead Run (1967)
- The Flashing Blade (TV serial, 1967)
- Le rapace (1967)
- Emma Hamilton (1968)
- A Golden Widow (1969)
- Une drôle de Bourrique (1969)
- Le Cri du cormoran, le soir au-dessus des jonques (1970)
- Le drapeau noir flotte sur la marmite (1971)
- Elle cause plus, elle flingue(1972)
- Molière pour rire et pour pleurer (TV miniseries, 1973)
- Les brigades du Tigre (TV series, 1974)
- Au delà de la peur (1974)
- Introductions (1976)
- Ce diable d'homme (TV series, 1978)
- Mein Freund Winnetou, (TV series, 1980)
- Le Braconnier de dieu (1982)
- Le blaireau s'fait mousser (1984)
- Carné, l’homme à la caméra (documentary, 1985)
