= I colpevoli =

- Directed by: Turi Vasile
- Starring: Isa Miranda
- Cinematography: Roberto Gerardi
- Music by: Carlo Innocenzi
- Release date: 1957
- Language: Italian

I colpevoli (French: Responsabilité limitée, lit. The Guilty) is a 1957 Italian-French drama film directed by Turi Vasile. It is based on the comedy play Sulle strade di notte by Renato Lelli.

== Plot ==
Valerio Rossello is a judge, with a rigid and uncompromising mentality. He is married to Lucia, a woman who instead follows the model of a loving and protective mother. From their union only one child was born: Maurizio. Both parents raise him completely differently, highlighting their character differences. Until the day when Maurizio, now a teenager, together with a friend commits an attack for futile reasons against a gas station attendant. Having learned of the incident, Valerio and Lucia also in this case intend to face the situation in a diametrically opposite way. The conflicts within the family thus strongly resurface, in which, amidst rebounds of responsibility, the errors of both parents emerge in the upbringing of their child.

== Cast ==
- Isa Miranda: Lucia Rossello
- Carlo Ninchi: Valerio Rossello
- Vittorio De Sica: Giorgio
- Etchika Choureau: Sandra
- Helene Partello: Susanna
- Wandisa Guida (as Vandisa Guida)
