= Rita Cadillac (French dancer) =

French dancer, singer, and actress

Rita Cadillac on the cover of her single Ne touchez pas à l'animal (Barclay Records, 1971).

Rita Cadillac (born Nicole Yasterbelsky; 18 May 1936 – 4 April 1995) was a French dancer, singer, and actress.

Cadillac was born in Paris and started her music career as an accordionist under the alias "Rita Rella" at the age of 13. In 1952, she was a pin-up model and took the name "Rita Cadillac" (clearly as an allusion to her prominent breasts) at Crazy Horse where she began to work as an exotic dancer. She was also a dancer of Folies Bergère in the 1950s.

Cadillac appeared in many French films such as Soirs de Paris (1954), Porte océane (1958), La prostitution (1962), Un clair de lune à Maubeuge (1962), and Any Number Can Win (1963), becoming a renowned figure throughout Europe. In 1981, she appeared in the miniseries and film Das Boot, as the club singer Monique, in the town of La Rochelle.

She is the inspiration for Miss Rita Chevrolet, a recurring joke in the British satirical magazine Private Eye.

== Selected filmography ==
- Until the Last One (1957)
- Prostitution (1963)
- Das Boot (1981)
