= It's the Paris Life =

- German-language poster
- Directed by: Alfred Rode
- Written by: Jacques Companéez; Louis Martin; Yves Mirande; Georges Tabet
- Produced by: Alfred Rode
- Starring: Claudine Dupuis; Philippe Lemaire; Raymond Bussières
- Cinematography: André Thomas
- Edited by: Isabelle Elman
- Music by: Roger-Roger
- Production companies: L.C.J. Editions & Productions; Société des Films A. Rode
- Release date: 28 May 1954
- Running time: 100 minutes
- Country: France
- Language: French

It's the Paris Life (French: C'est la vie parisienne) is a 1954 French comedy film directed by Alfred Rode and starring Claudine Dupuis, Philippe Lemaire and Raymond Bussières. It was shot in Gevacolor. The film portrays the development of Parisian musical culture between 1900 and 1950.

== Partial cast ==
- Claudine Dupuis as Cri-Cri Delagrange / Christine Weston
- Philippe Lemaire as Paul de Barfleur / Alain de Villebois
- Raymond Bussières as Anatole Leduc
- Noël Roquevert as Noël Le Garrec
- Jean Tissier as M. Weston
- Maryse Martin as Mlle Machu
- Arlette Poirier as Emilienne de Montluçon
- Claude Luter as himself
- Saturnin Fabre as Comte Gontran de Barfleur
- Jim Gérald as L'Américain
- Amédée as Daniel
- Alfred Rode as Drago
- Colette Régis as La comtesse
- Georges Bever as Le maître d'hôtel
- Françoise Delbart as L'amie
- Olivier Mathot
- José Dupuis as Léopold
- Les Trompes de la Chasse du Dèbuché de Paris as Themselves

== Bibliography ==
- Hayward, Susan. French Costume Drama of the 1950s: Fashioning Politics in Film. Intellect Books, 2010.
