= Colette Ripert =

French actress

Collette Ripert
- Born: 17 January 1930; France
- Died: 20 May 1999 (aged 69); Paris, France
- Occupation: Actress
- Years active: 1947-1986

Colette Ripert (17 January 1930 – 20 May 1999) was a French actress. She is best known to English speakers as "Tante Georgette" in the series French in Action.

== Selected filmography ==
- Les jeux sont faits (1947)
- Eternal Conflict (1948)
- Keep an Eye on Amelia (1949)
- The Girl from Maxim's (1950)
- The King of Camelots (1951)
- I Had Seven Daughters (1954)
- Faites-moi confiance (1954)
- Your Turn, Callaghan (1955)
- Happy Arenas (1958)
- Vice Squad (1959)
- They Killed a Corpse (1962)
