= Gypsy Melody =

- Lupe Vélez (centre) in the film
- Directed by: Edmond T. Gréville
- Written by: Irving LeRoy; Dan Weldon; Alfred Rode
- Produced by: Emil E. Reinert; Alfred Rode
- Starring: Lupe Vélez; Alfred Rode; Jerry Verno; Raymond Lovell
- Cinematography: Claude Friese-Greene
- Edited by: Georges Grace
- Music by: Alfred Rode
- Production company: British Artistic
- Distributed by: Wardour Films
- Release date: 27 July 1936
- Running time: 77 minutes
- Country: United Kingdom
- Language: English

Gypsy Melody (also known as Capitaine Tzigane and Gipsy Melody) is a 1936 British musical comedy film directed by Edmond T. Gréville and starring Lupe Vélez, Alfred Rode and Jerry Verno. It was written by Irving LeRoy, Dan Weldon and Rode, and made at Elstree Studios. The sets were designed by art director John Mead. It was a remake of the 1935 French film Juanita.

== Preservation status ==
In 1992 the British Film Institute classed Gypsy Melody as a lost film, but its National Archive now holds the film and a collection of ephemera and stills.

== Synopsis ==
Due to a complex series of events a Guards Officer in a small European country is imprisoned. He manages to escape in the company of an idiotic milliner and they briefly take shelter with some gypsies, where the Captain falls in love with a young woman. Having been discovered by an American promoter while performing with gypsy orchestra in a tavern, the three accompany him to London as the latest new musical sensation. A great success, they begin a European-wide tour when their plane is forced down by bad weather in their homeland. Here events are satisfactorily resolved.

== Cast ==
- Lupe Vélez as Mila
- Alfred Rode as Captain Eric Danilo
- Jerry Verno as Madame Beatrice
- Raymond Lovell as Court Chamberlain
- Margaret Yarde as Grand Duchess
- Fred Duprez as Herbert P. Melon
- Hector Abbas as Biergarten manager
- Louis Darnley as hotel manager
- G. De Joncourt as Doctor Ipstein
- Monti DeLyle as Marco
- Wyn Weaver as Grand Duke

== Reception ==
The Monthly Film Bulletin wrote: "Except for one or two unusually beautiful exterior sequences and some interesting technical tricks the film shows little evidence of the work of the director of Remous. Lupe Velez's portrayal of a gypsy is definitely 'musical comedyish,' and Alfred Rode, who is not an actor, is very unconvincing as the dashing hero, although his personal charm carries him through. The Jewish hatter is trying at first, but some of the comedy relief scenes are entertaining. Fred Duprez gives an amusing caricature of an American impresario and a little more of Margaret Yarde as the domineering Grand Duchess would have been welcome. The music constitutes the film's major appeal and it is almost worth seeing the film just for the performance of Liszt's Second Hungarian Rhapsody, which is extremely well rendered by Rode and his orchestra, and excellently recorded."

Kine Weekly wrote: "Attention has been concentrated on the few big scenes, the minor ones indicating dramatic economy. Editing has also been drastic, with scenes obviously omitted, leaving bad gaps. There are some nice touches of direction but the whole thing gives impression of having been somewhat laboriously translated from a foreign language."

The Daily Film Renter wrote: "Attractively photographed, with picturesque rural exteriors as feature, an acceptable popular offering of type. ... Mr. Rode and his musicians play spirited Tzigane melodies, while there is some pleasant dancing by Miss Velez. Photography is first rate, particularly in some beautiful rural exterior shots which have been brought to the screen with a great deal of artistry. The story, however, seems slender, and the plot occasionally hovers uncertainly between sheer slapstick and satire."

Variety wrote: "Unpretentious musical romance fo exploit the talents of the popular Tzigane dance orchestra under the direction of Alfred Rode, who says little but looks soulful. ...Charming country scenes, and general artistic backgrounds make this pleasing light entertainment; particularly for lovers of the vagabond type of music, it should be more than satisfying."

Picturegoer wrote: "The big scenes are well handled but generally there is a lack of co-ordination between the various elements that go to make the plot."

Picture Show wrote: "Alfred Rode is well-known as a musician, but in this picture he proves he can play a part as well as play music. A really fine performance is given by Fred Duprez as the American manager, and Jerry Verno is an amusing Madame Beatrice. But one of the big features of the film is the playing of the orchestra, the music at times rising to great heights."
