= The Man from Interpol (film) =

- Directed by: Maurice Boutel
- Written by: Maurice Boutel
- Starring: Hubert Noël; Donald O'Brien; Junie Astor
- Cinematography: Gilbert Sarthre
- Edited by: Etiennette Muse
- Music by: Eddie Warner
- Release date: 17 May 1966
- Country: France
- Language: French

The Man from Interpol (French: L'homme de l'Interpol) is a 1966 French crime film directed by Maurice Boutel and starring Hubert Noël, Donald O'Brien and Junie Astor.

== Cast ==
- Hubert Noël as Alec Suller
- Donald O'Brien as Polard
- Junie Astor as Wanda
- Chris Kersen as Bradford
- Silvia Solar as Lydia

== Bibliography ==
- Philippe Rège. Encyclopedia of French Film Directors, Volume 1. Scarecrow Press, 2009.
