= Arlette and Love =

1943 French romantic comedy film

- Directed by: Robert Vernay
- Written by: Marcel Pagnol
- Based on: Atout Coeur! by Félix Gandéra
- Produced by: Jean Le Duc; Roger Sallard
- Starring: André Luguet; Josette Day; André Alerme
- Cinematography: Victor Arménise
- Edited by: Pierre Caillet; Jean Feyte
- Music by: Roger Desormière
- Production company: Société Nouvelle des Établissements Gaumont
- Distributed by: Gaumont
- Release date: 22 September 1943
- Running time: 104 minutes
- Country: France
- Language: French

Arlette and Love (French: Arlette et l'amour) is a 1943 French romantic comedy film directed by Robert Vernay and starring André Luguet, Josette Day and André Alerme. It is based on the play Atout Coeur! by Félix Gandéra, adapted for the screen by Marcel Pagnol. It was filmed at the Marseille Studios while location shooting took place around Antibes and Aix-en-Provence. The film's sets were designed by the art director Robert Giordani.

== Synopsis ==
Arlette meets and marries a man posing as a count, who robs her and absconds on her wedding night. Her mother then tracks down the real aristocrat whose name was stolen and insists that he is legally married to her daughter.

== Cast ==
- André Luguet as Le vrai comte Raoul de Tremblay-Matour
- Josette Day as Arlette Milloix
- André Alerme as Le baron Gingleux
- Jimmy Gaillard as Maxime Noblet
- René Alié as Le faux comte de Tremblay-Matour
- Jean Aquistapace as Le curé
- Andrée de Chauveron as Mme Millois – la mère d'Arlette
- Alexandre Fabry as L'aubergiste
- Albert Gercourt as Gilbert
- Pierre Labry as Jules – le domestique
- René Lefèvre as Le notaire
- Robert Moor as Mathurin
- Henri Poupon as Breteuil
- Sylvette Saugé as Sylvie
- Jean Toulout as Le comte de Brulant

== Publications ==
The sermon long prepared by the priest for the future marriage of the real count, and of which he believes he has been cheated when he learns of the fake marriage, was included by Norbert Calmels, the abbot general of the Premonstratensians and a personal friend of Marcel Pagnol’s, in a collection of sermons from his works.

== Bibliography ==
- Baylie, Claude. Marcel Pagnol, ou, Le cinéma en liberté. Editions Atlas, 1986.
- Oscherwitz, Dayna & Higgins, MaryEllen. The A to Z of French Cinema. Scarecrow Press, 2009.
