= Howard Vernon =

Swiss actor and photographer (1908-1996)

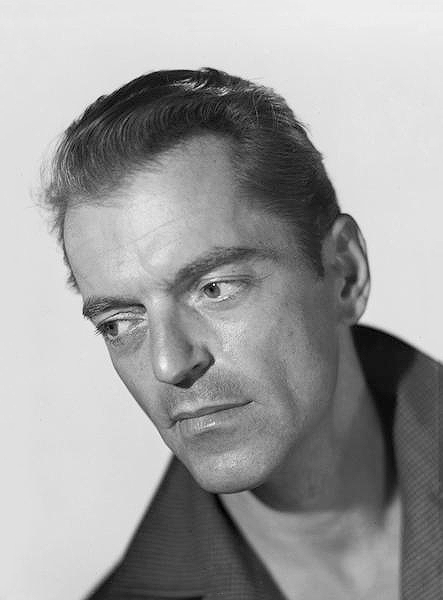
- Vernon in 1951
- Born: Mario Walter Lippert; 15 July 1908; Baden-Baden, Baden-Württemberg, German Empire
- Died: 25 July 1996 (aged 88); Issy-les-Moulineaux, Paris, France
- Citizenship: Switzerland
- Occupations: Actor; photographer
- Years active: 1945–1996

Mario Walter Lippert (15 July 1908 – 25 July 1996), better known by his stage name Howard Vernon, was a German-born Swiss actor and photographer. He had an extensive career in French cinema which spanned nearly 200 productions over 55 years, between 1945 and 2000. He was best known for his close association with cult filmmaker Jesús Franco, appearing in 40 of the director’s films, beginning with the titular character in The Awful Dr. Orloff (1962).

A prolific character actor, Vernon also worked with many other prominent filmmakers, notably Jean-Luc Godard, Jean-Pierre Melville, René Clément, Powell & Pressburger, Sacha Guitry, Fritz Lang, John Frankenheimer, Roger Vadim, Fred Zinnemann, Woody Allen and Jean-Pierre Jeunet. He was also active as a dubber.

== Early life ==
Vernon was born Mario Walter Lippert in 1908, in Baden-Baden, Baden-Württemberg, Germany to a Swiss hotelier, Julius Lippert, and a German mother, Doris (née Häffner). His family returned to Switzerland shortly after he was born, and he was raised in the canton of Aargau. He grew up in a trilingual household, and was fluent in French, German, and English. He studied acting in Berlin, where he made his stage acting debut in 1936. Back in Switzerland, he continued his studies under Erwin Kalser. Moving to Paris, France, he performed in theaters, cabarets, and music halls, notably the Casino de Paris.

At the outbreak of World War II and the occupation of France, Vernon was employed by Fernsehsender Paris, the German-run television broadcaster, as he was bilingual and from a neutral country. In 1944, he moved to England and joined the BBC as a translator and broadcaster. He returned to Paris after the liberation of France.

== Career ==
Originally a stage and radio actor, he worked primarily in France and became a well-known supporting actor after 1945 by playing villainous Nazi officers in post-war French films. Jean-Pierre Melville's Le Silence de la mer, in which he played a gentle anti-Nazi German officer, made him somewhat famous but, in part due to his rough-hewn looks and Swiss accent, he was subsequently relegated to playing gangsters and heavies. He was nonetheless a favorite of Melville, who subsequently cast him in films.

In the 1960s, he became a favorite actor of Spanish horror director Jesús Franco and began starring in many low-budget horror and erotic movies produced in Spain and France, often portraying a mad doctor or a sadist. He continued to make increasingly small appearances in high-profile films while often getting top billing in many Grade-Z low budget films. Horror film fans consider his three greatest horror roles to be The Awful Dr. Orloff (1962) which introduced Franco's famed mad doctor character, Dracula, Prisoner of Frankenstein (1972) in which he actually played Count Dracula, and The Erotic Rites of Frankenstein (1972) in which he played Count Cagliostro.

Between his work with Franco, whom he came to consider a personal friend, he continued to appear in more high-profile projects, and was active as a dubber. He also remained active in the theatre.

== Personal life ==
Vernon was an avid photographer, and worked as a behind-the-scenes still photographer on several films in which he acted, credited under his birth name “Mario Lippert”.

=== Death ===
Vernon died in the Issy-les-Moulineaux, district of Paris, 10 days after his 88th birthday.

== Selected filmography ==
- Boule de Suif (1945) .... Un Prussien (uncredited)
- Jericho (1946) .... Un officier allemand (uncredited)
- A Friend Will Come Tonight (1946) .... Robert Langlois, le muet
- Les clandestins (1946)
- L'insaisissable Frédéric (1946) .... (uncredited)
- Night Warning (1946) .... L'aviateur anglais
- Mr. Orchid (1946) .... Le lieutenant Fleischer, l'officier allemand
- Devil and the Angel (1946) .... Un Homme de Main de Furet
- The Royalists (1947) .... Le capitaine Gérard
- Le Bataillon du ciel (1947) .... Un officier allemand (uncredited)
- The Die Is Cast (aka "The Chips Are Down") (1947) .... Le chef milicien
- Le colonel Durand (1948)
- The Lame Devil (1948, director: Sacha Guitry) .... Lord Palmerston
- Le Silence de la mer (1949, director: Jean-Pierre Melville) .... Werner von Ebrennac
- Du Guesclin (1949) .... Lancaster
- The Man on the Eiffel Tower (1949) .... Inspector (uncredited)
- L'auberge du péché (1949) .... Ducourt
- Shot at Dawn (1950) .... Colonel von Pennwitz
- The Fighting Pimpernel (1950) .... Comte de Tournai
- Black Jack (1950) .... Schooner Captain
- Adventures of Captain Fabian (1951) .... Emile
- Nightclub (1951) .... Charles
- Si ça vous chante (1951)
- The Secret of the Mountain Lake (1952) .... Borgo, der Schmugglerwirt
- The Girl with the Whip (1952) .... Borgo
- Manina, the Girl in the Bikini (1952) .... Éric
- La môme vert-de-gris / Poison Ivy (1953) .... Rudy Saltierra
- Monsieur Scrupule, Gangster (1953) .... L'ami de Rolande
- Little Jacques (1953) .... Daniel Mortal
- Lucrèce Borgia (1953) .... Le chapelain
- Royal Affairs in Versailles (1954) .... L'acheteur anglais (uncredited)
- Operation Thunder (1954) .... Roger Kervec
- The Phantom of the Big Tent (1954) .... Armand LaRue, König der Luft
- Napoléon (1955) .... Lord Liverpool (uncredited)
- Pas de souris dans le business (1955) .... Robert Leperque
- El fugitivo de Amberes (1955, director: Miguel Iglesias) .... Bell Fermer
- 08/15 at Home (1955) .... CIC-Offizier Ted
- Alerte aux Canaries (1956) .... Maxime Bellac
- Bob le Flambeur (1956) .... McKimmie - le commanditaire
- La melodía misteriosa (1956) .... L'inspecteur de police Revel
- The River of Three Junks (1957) .... Igor Kourguine
- Until the Last One (1957) .... Philippe Dario - le trapéziste
- Doctor Crippen Lives (1958)
- Pensione Edelweiss (1959) .... Général Funck
- Heiße Ware (1959) .... Heinrich Strasser
- Nathalie, Secret Agent (1959).... William Dantoren
- Muerte al amanecer (1959)
- Une gueule comme la mienne (1960) .... Howard
- The Thousand Eyes of Dr. Mabuse (1960, director: Fritz Lang) .... No. 12
- Brandenburg Division (1960) .... Secret Service Man
- Interpol Against X (1960) .... L'inspecteur Jackson
- The Secret Ways (1961) .... Colonel Hidas
- Léon Morin, Priest (1961) .... The colonel
- Capitaine tempête (1961)
- First Criminal Brigade (1962) .... Steven Hals
- The Awful Dr. Orloff / Screams in the Night/ Gritos en la Noche/ L'Horrible Docteur Orloff (1962, director: Jesús Franco) .... Dr. Orloff
- Zorro the Avenger (1962) .... General Clarence
- Han matado a un cadáver (1962) .... Inspector Bernhardt
- Shades of Zorro (1962) aka The Shadow of Zorro.... El General
- La mano de un hombre muerto/ The Sadistic Baron Von Klaus (1962, director: Jesús Franco) ) .... Baron Max von Klaus
- Vice and Virtue (1963) .... SS General
- Autopsy of a Criminal (1963) .... Villar
- Black Angel of the Mississippi (1964) .... Ray Terris
- The Train (1964, director: John Frankenheimer) .... Dietrich
- On Murder Considered as One of the Fine Arts (1964)
- Alphaville (aka "Une étrange aventure de Lemmy Caution") (1965, director: Jean-Luc Godard) .... Prof. Leonard Nosferatu aka von Braun (uncredited)
- What's New Pussycat? (1965, director: Clive Donner) .... Doctor
- Taiwo Shango - Der zweite Tag nach dem Tod (1965) ... Dr. Brian Murray
- Operation Double Cross (1965, director: Gilles Grangier) .... Le 'professeur'
- The Poppy Is Also a Flower (1966) .... Dr. Pineau
- The Game Is Over (1966) .... Lawyer
- The Diabolical Dr. Z / Miss Muerte / Miss Death (1966, director: Jesús Franco) .... Dr. Vicas
- Le chien fou (1966) .... Fred
- Triple Cross (1966) .... German Embassy Official
- Residencia para espías/ Residence for Spies (1966, director: Jesús Franco) .... Radek (uncredited cameo)
- The Unknown Man of Shandigor (1967) .... Yank / Bobby Gun
- The Night of the Generals (1967) .... Herr Schusslig, Suspect in Erika Müller's Murder (uncredited)
- Only a Coffin (1967) .... Dam Gaillimh
- Les têtes brûlées (1967)
- Necronomicon: Dreamt Sin / Succubus (1967, director: Jesús Franco) .... Admiral Kapp
- Im Schloß der blutigen Begierde (1968) .... Graf Saxon
- Mayerling (1968) .... Prince Montenuevo (uncredited)
- Marquis de Sade's Justine / Deadly Sanctuary (1969, director: Jesús Franco) .... Clément
- The Bloody Judge / Throne of Fire/ The Witch Killer of Blackmoor (1970, director: Jesús Franco) .... Jack Ketch
- The Blood Rose / Le Rose Eschorchée / The Flayed Rose (1970, director: Claude Mulot) .... Professeur Römer
- Orloff and the Invisible Man (1970, director: Pierre Chevalier) .... Le professeur Orloff
- Love Me Strangely (1971) .... Maître Wasserman - l'administrateur de biens
- The Devil Came from Akasava (1971, director: Jesús Franco) .... Valet Humphrey
- X312 - Flight to Hell / X 312 – Flug zur Hölle (1971, director: Jesus Franco) .... Pedro
- She Killed in Ecstasy / Mrs. Hyde (1971, director: Jesús Franco) .... Prof. Jonathan Walker
- Jungfrauen-Report/ Virgin Report (1972, director: Jesús Franco).... Medieval de-fliowerer / Anna's Father / The Inquisitor
- Sex Charade (1972, director: Jesús Franco) this film was unreleased
- Casa d'appuntamento (1972) .... Professor Waldemar
- Dracula, Prisoner of Frankenstein (1972, director: Jesús Franco) .... Drácula
- Robinson und seine wilden Sklavinnen/ Three Naked Women on Robinson Island (1972, director: Jesús Franco).... Yakube / Actor in Adult Movie / Film Director's Assistant
- Daughter of Dracula (1972, director: Jesús Franco) .... Count Karlstein / Dracula
- Les ebranlées/ House of Vice (1972, director: Jesús Franco) .... Al Pereira
- The Demons (1973, director: Jesús Franco) .... Lord Malcolm De Winter
- The Day of the Jackal (1973) .... Cabinet Member (uncredited)
- The Erotic Rites of Frankenstein / The Curse of Frankenstein / La Maldicion de Frankenstein (1973, director: Jesús Franco) .... Cagliostro
- Le journal intime d'une nymphomane (1973, director: Jesús Franco) .... Doctor
- Lovers of Devil's Island (1973, director: Jesús Franco) .... Colonel Ford
- A Virgin Among the Living Dead (1973) / Christina, Princess of Eroticism (1971, director: Jesús Franco) .... Uncle Howard
- Al otro lado del espejo / The Other Side of the Mirror (1973, director: Jesús Franco) .... Howard / Anetta's father
- Un capitán de quince años / A Captain of 15 Years (1974, director: Jesús Franco) ... Korda
- Plaisir à trois/ How to Seduce a Virgin (1974, director: Jesús Franco) .... Mathias
- Celestine, Maid at Your Service (1974, director: Jesús Franco).... Le duc
- Lorna the Exorcist (1974, director: Jesús Franco) .... Maurizius
- La Comtesse Perverse (1974, director: Jesús Franco) .... Count Rador
- Les gloutonnes (1975, director: Jesús Franco) .... Cagliostro
- That Most Important Thing: Love (1975) .... (voice, uncredited)
- Les intrigues de Sylvia Couski (1975)
- Le jardin qui bascule (1975) .... Paul
- The Musician Killer (1975) .... Anton Varga
- Love and Death (1975, director: Woody Allen) .... General Leveque
- Change pas de main (1975) .... Jacques des Grieux
- The Mark of Zorro (1975) .... Gov. Hayes
- Seven Women for Satan (1976) .... Karl, Zaroff's servant
- Le théâtre des matières (1977) .... Hermann
- Women in Cellblock 9 (1978, director: Jesús Franco).... Dr. Milton
- Les belles manières (1978) .... Le directeur de la prison
- From Hell to Victory (1979) .... SS Major Karl
- Zombie Lake / Le Lac des Morts Vivants / Lake of the Living Dead (1981, director: Jean Rollin) .... The Mayor
- Docteur Jekyll et les femmes (1981) .... Dr. Lanyon
- L'appât du gain (1981)
- Revenge in the House of Usher / Neurosis (1982, director: Jesús Franco) .... René Dimanche
- Revenge in the House of Usher (1983 re-edited version) .... Eric Usher
- Sangre en mis zapatos/ Blood on my Shoes (1983, director: Jesús Franco) .... Profesor Albert Von Klaus
- Ogroff (1983) .... Vampire
- Le fou du roi (1984) .... Abbé guibourd
- The Sinister Dr. Orloff (1984, director: Jesús Franco) .... Dr. Orloff
- All Mixed Up (1985) .... Le docteur Belin - un médecin hémiplégique
- The Boy Who Had Everything (1985) .... Singing Man
- Viaje a Bangkok, ataúd incluido (1985, director: Jesús Franco) .... Coronel Daniel J. Blimp
- El hombre que mató a Mengele (1985)
- Faubourg St Martin (1986) .... Le Clients Grincheux
- Las tribulaciones de un Buda Bizco (1986)
- Terminus (1987) .... Monsieur (voice)
- The Death of Empedocles (1987) .... Hermokrates
- Commando Mengele (1987) .... Josef Mengele
- Dernier été à Tanger (1987) .... Maître Schmidt, un avocat suisse
- Faceless / Predators of the Night (1987, director: Jesús Franco) .... Docteur Orloff
- Howl of the Devil (1987, director: Paul Naschy) .... Eric
- Black Sin (1989, Short) .... Manes
- Le champignon des Carpathes (1990) .... Jeremy Fairfax
- In the Eye of the Snake (1990) .... Old Jean
- Delicatessen (1991, director: Jean-Pierre Jeunet) .... Frog Man
- The Girl Who Came Late (1992) .... Dr. Montgomery
- Faux rapports (1992) .... Garnier
- Hey Stranger (1994) .... Old officer
- Le Rocher d'Acapulco (1995) .... Le vieil homme
- Le complexe de Toulon (1996) .... Charles Toulon
- Banqueroute (2000) .... Georges (final film role)
