= Colette Renard =

French actress and singer (1924–2010)

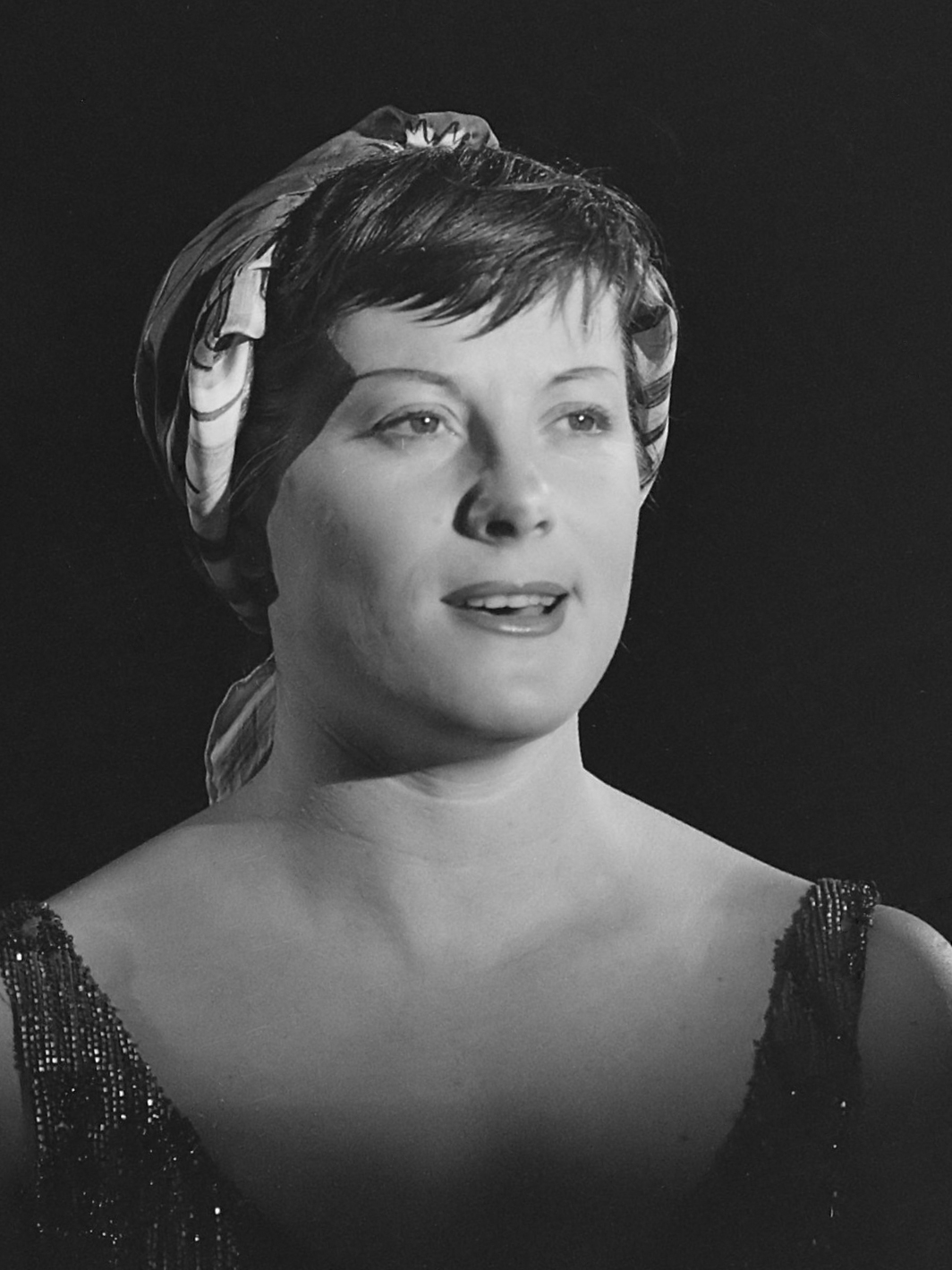
- Colette Renard (1961)
- Born: Colette Lucie Raget; 1 November 1924; Ermont, Val d'Oise, France
- Died: 6 October 2010 (aged 85); Saint-Rémy-lès-Chevreuse, Yvelines, France
- Occupations: Actress, singer
- Spouse: Raymond Legrand (m. 1960; div. 1969)

Colette Renard (1 November 1924, Ermont – 6 October 2010, Saint-Rémy-lès-Chevreuse), born Colette Lucie Raget, was a French actress and singer. Renard is closely associated with the titular character from the musical Irma La Douce, a role she played for over a decade.

Renard retired from theatre and film in the 1980s, returning in 2004 to play the role of Rachel Levy on Plus belle la vie. In addition to acting, Renard was a prolific singer, having released 52 albums during her career.

== Discography ==
=== Studio albums ===
- 1957: Chante Paris (Disques Vogue w/ orchestra dir. by Raymond Legrand)
- 1957: Irma la Douce (Disques Vogue, 10"; w/ orchestra dir. by Raymond Legrand)
- 1958: Sur le Bord de Paris (Disques Vogue, 10"; w/ orchestra dir. by Raymond Legrand)
- 1958: Envoie la musique (Disques Vogue, 10"; w/ orchestra dir. by Raymond Legrand)
- 1958: Chante la vieille France (Disques Vogue; w/ orchestra dir. by Raymond Legrand)
- 1959: Chansons gaillardes de la vieille France (Disques Vogue)
- 1961: La chanson française (Disques Vogue)
- 1961: Tête-à-tête avec Colette Renard (Disques Vogue)
- 1963: Chansons très libertines (Disques Vogue)
- 1965: Bon appétit... (Disques Vogue)
- 1966: Poèmes libertins du temps passé (Disques Vogue; w/ orchestra dir. by Raymond Legrand)
- 1967: Poèmes libertins du temps présent (Disques Vogue; w/ orchestra dir. by Raymond Legrand)
- 1967: 1967 - La nouvelle Colette Renard (Decca)
- 1967: Irma la douce (Decca, double album of duets, with Franck Fernandel and René Dupuy)
- 1968: Mille Ans de Chronique Scandaleuse - La chanson satirique de Charlemagne à Charles de Gaulle - 1ère époque (Decca)
- 1969: Chansons polissonnes (Decca)
- 1969: Paris-Montmartre (Disques Vogue)
- 1971: Liverpool la nuit (45 single, Disques Vogue)
- 1971: Chansons galantes (Disques Vogue)
- 1971: Des Histoire de Bonnes (Disques Vogue)
- 1973: Au clocher de mon coeur (Variété Française, double album)
- 1973: Chansons érotiques du royaume de France (Vogue)
- 1975: Depuis le temps que je chante que je t'aime (Vogue)
- 1977: A Bobino (Vogue)
- 1978: Une valse bleue (Sonopresse)
- 1979: Il y a des jours comme ça (Mary Melody)
- 1983: Un amour de femme (associated with a theatrical production; Pathé)
- 1986: Fables d'aujourd'hui (Disques Chrsital; spoken word, written by Lucien Baumann)
- 2002: Ceux qui s'aiment (Chateigner / V)

=== Live albums ===
- 1958: À l'Olympia - 10 chansons nouvelles (Disques Vogue, 10"; w/ orchestra dir. by Raymond Legrand)
- 1960: À l'Olympia - Volume 8
- 1962: À l'Olympia
- 1964: Récital 65

=== Compilations ===
- 1987: Les grands succès (cd Vogue, 16 songs)
- 1992: 36 chansons gaillardes et libertines (double cd Vogue)
- 2001: Colette Renard (Triple cd, Reader's Digest selection, 72 songs)

=== 45 RPM ===
- 78 T Pacific 1998: La gorgonzola / Robinson Crusoë (1949)
- EP Festival FX 451148M : Les filles du bucheron / A la belle étoile / Qu'elle est belle / Sous les pommiers (sortis sur deux 78 T en 1952, regroupés sur cet EP en 1958)
- EP Vogue EPL 7273: Les godasses / Ferme-là / Simonetta / L'âge atomique (Rock Around The Island) (1956)
- EP Vogue EPL 7293: L'arbre et l'homme / Les jouets / L'homme et l'araignée / Mon île (1956)
- EP Vogue EPL 7300: Chante les airs d'Irma la douce : Avec les anges / Irma la douce / Y'a qu'Paris pour ça / Ah ! dis donc (1956)
- EP Vogue EPL 7365: Quand t'auras mangé ta soupe / L'homme en habit / Calypso mélodie / Où va-t-on se nicher ? (1957)
- EP Vogue EPL 7367: Zon, zon, zon / Sa casquette / Sur le pont St Louis / C'est du soleil de t'embrasser (1957)
- EP Vogue EPL 7394: Chante les succès du film Un roi à New York : Mandoline amoureuse / Toi l'amour / La complainte des cœur purs / Sur les bords de Paris (1957)
- EP Vogue EPL 7438: Croquemitoufle / Tais-toi Marseille / L'orphéon / A Paris, y'a tout ça (1958)
- EP Vogue EPL 7440: Zon, zon, zon / Sa casquette / L'homme en habit / Où va-t'on se nicher ? (1958)
- EP Vogue EPL 7440: Les chansons gaillardes de la vieille France : Les filles de La Rochelle / La femme du roulier / Sur la route de Louviers / Les trente brigands (1958)
- EP Vogue EPL 7510: L'eau vive / Le bonheur / Envoie-la musique / Trois fois rien (1958)
- EP Vogue EPL 7544: Ca, c'est d'la musique / L'enfant aux oranges / La Sainte-Flemme / C'est moi la java (1958)
- EP Vogue EPL 7565: Le poète / Le soleil / Marie la bleue / La fleur des champs (1958)
- EP Vogue EPL 7568: Noëls : Je n'ai pas eu de jouets / Serge et Nathalie / Drôle d'histoire / La Vierge à la crèche (1958)
- EP Vogue EPL 7576: Le cheval de bois / La débine / Les chagrins d'amour / Faux-pas (1959)
- EP Vogue EPL 7625: L'Opéra de quat'sous : Le chant des canons / La fiancée du pirate / La complainte de Mackie / La chanson de Barbara (1959)
- EP Vogue EPL 7637: Mon homme est un guignol / Y veut de la java / Emmène-moi / Les regrets de jeunesse (1959)
- EP Vogue EPL 7638: Chansons de films : Comment voulez-vous ? / Business / La complainte de Gaud / Bal de nuit (1959)
- EP Vogue EPL 7652: Les chefs-d'oeuvre de la chanson française : Colette Renard chante la vieille France : À la claire fontaine / Le retour du marin / Va mon ami va / Aux marches du palais (1959)
- EP Vogue EPL 7658: Chansons gaillardes de la vieille France : La puce / Le doigt gelé / En revenant du Piémont / Au clair de la lune (1959)
- EP Vogue EPL 7664: C'est d'la musique / Tais-toi Marseille / L'orphéon / Marie la bleue (1959)
- EP Vogue EPL 7700: Mes copains / T'as misé dans le mille / Qu'est-ce que t'as pu me faire / Le pauvre chien (1959)
- EP Vogue EPL 7726: Petite annonce sentimentale / Les musiciens / Toi, l'inconnu / Le vendeur de roses (1960)
- EP Vogue EPL 7730: Mon homme est un guignol / Je n'ai pas eu de jouets / Emmène-moi / Le bonheur (1960)
- EP Vogue EPL 7775: La taxi girl / Ma rengaine / Je m'appelle Daysie / Des histoires (1960)
- EP Vogue EPL 7806: 4,95 la charlotte / On cultive l'amour / T'es le roi / Rue du croissant (1961)
- EP Vogue EPL 7823: La fille et le soldat / Comme un cygne blanc / La chanson pauvre / Paris a le cœur tendre (1961)
- EP Vogue EPL 7865: Les p'tits français / Ma chanson lonla-lonlaine / Suis-moi t'en auras / Hôtel du nord (1961)
- EP Vogue EPL 7874: La Marie du port / Les enfants de Paris / Quand sonneront les cloches / Ca m'chavire (1961)
- EP Vogue EPL 7929: Charmante nature / Des souv'nirs, des souv'nirs / Ah ! Donnez m'en de la chanson / Bilissi (1962)
- EP Vogue EPL 8061: Voir Naples et mourir / Professionnellement / Le grand partage / La samba des parisiennes (1962)
- EP Vogue EPL 7931: Le marin et la rose / Sacré bistrot / Ils jouent de la trompette / C'est la vie (1962)
- EP Vogue EPL 8074: Hardi Paname (version 45t) / Sur leur visage / J't'aimerai pas plus / Heureusement (1963)
- 45t Vogue V.45.1076 : Le retour des héros / Alors, c'est pour quand ? (1963)
- EP Vogue EPL 8141: La foraine / Ils voulaient voir la mer / Les nuits d'une demoiselle [version soft expurgée] (1963)
- EP Vogue EPL 8183: Mon père et ma mère / La dernière petit note / Le truc / Chez Marie la vieille (1963)
- EP Vogue EPL 8295: Le plumard / Assieds-toi donc sur ta valise / Le rencard / Elle ou moi (1964)
- EP Vogue EPL 8332: Ah! Le petit vin blanc / Le chaland qui passe / Refrain des chevaux de bois / Ici l'on pèche (1965)
- EP Vogue EPL 8375: Alfred Hitchcock / Mossieu Boby / Gibraltar story / La goélette et le capitaine (1965)
- EP CBS 5676: Chante Jehanne Vérité : Un petit oiseau de Lorraine / Les chalands / Toutes les larmes / Les moutons (1966)
- EP Decca 461.113M: Un piano / L'amour et les marées / Marie scandale (1967)
- EP Decca 461.131M: Les maisons blanches / Je l'aime lui / Reste / Un garçon (1967)
- 45t Decca 79.528: Un air pour rien / Y a du soleil dans ma chambre (1968)
- 45t Decca 23.812: Je l'ai vécu 100 fois / Marine (1968)
- 45t Decca 23.813: L'araignée / Ne riez pas de la bergère (1968)
- 45t Decca 23.814: La romance de Paris / La rue de notre amour (1968)
- 45t Emi/Pathé C006-11437: Lili Vertu / Changer de vie (1971)
- 45t Vogue V.45.4138: Chante Cabaret : Willkommen, Bienvenue... / Cabaret (1972)
- EP Vogue 45.V.4211: Les chansons de la comédie "Folle Amanda" : Mon Polo / Mon coeur attend qui ? / Que c'est bon d'être amoureuse / C'est beau la vie (1973)
- 45t Vogue 14098: B.O.F de Jean-François Davy Prostitution (1975), 1 title: Demain (1976)
- 45t Sonopresse 40289: Mirlitons / Je suis marionnette (1978)
- 45t Carrère 13.137: Chante Vichy Dancing : Amoureuse / Nostalgies (1983)

=== Selected songs ===
- 1956: Ah ! Dis donc, dis donc (Lyrics: Alexandre Breffort, Music: Marguerite Monnot)
- 1957: Zon… zon… zon… (Lyrics: Maurice Vidalin, Music: Jacques Datin)
- 1958: Tais-toi Marseille (Lyrics: Maurice Vidalin, Music: Jacques Datin)
- 1958: Ça, c'est d'la musique (Lyrics: Michel Rivgauche, Music: Norbert Glanzberg)
- 1958: Sa casquette (Lyrics: Fernand Bonifay, Music: Guy Magenta)
- 1959: Mon homme est un guignol (Lyrics and music: Jil and Jan)
- 1960: Des histoires (Lyrics: Michel Vaucaire, Music: Charles Dumont)
- 1961: Chanson tendre (Lyrics: Francis Carco, Music: Jacques Larmanjat)
- 1962: Le marin et la rose (Lyrics and music: Huard Pingault)
- 1979: Les lignes de ma vie
- 2002: Ceux qui s'aiment (Lyrics: Colette Renard, Music: François Rauber)

== Bibliography ==
- Colette Renard, Raconte-moi ta chanson, Grasset, 1998, 334 p. ISBN 2-246-57411-0
- Colette Renard, Ceux qui s'aiment : bloc-notes 1956-2006, edited by Pascal Maurice, Paris et Montréal, 2006, 64 p. ISBN 978-2-908681-18-5

== Filmography ==
=== Film ===
- 1958: Back to the Wall, Josianne Mauvin
- 1960: Business, Léa
- 1963: A King Without Distraction (Un roi sans divertissement), Clara
- 1965: Les pieds dans le plâtre, Irène
- 1970: Clodo, Mme Olga
- 1992: IP5: L'île aux pachydermes, Clarisse/Monique

=== Television ===
- 1964 : Pierrots des Alouettes, musical comedy by Henri Spade, Martine
- 1972: Les dossiers de Me Robineau: Les cagnards (TV movie), Gina
- 1973: La vie rêvée de Vincent Scotto (TV movie), Fréhel
- 1980: La chanson de Tiber (TV movie), Tiber Renarde
- 1982: Mon petit âne, ma mère (TV movie) The mother
- 1983: Vichy Dancing (TV movie), Véra Belmont
- 1986: Noël au Congo (TV movie), Mme Martel
- 1999: Justice (TV series), Olga
- 2003: Maigret (TV series), Jacqueline Larrieux dite Jacotte
- 2004: Docteur Dassin, généraliste (TV series), Mme Barry
- 2004 - 2009: Plus belle la vie (TV series), Rachel Lévy
- 2005: Le triporteur de Belleville (TV movie), Mme Belvèze

=== Theatre ===
- 1956: Irma La Douce by Alexandre Breffort and Marguerite Monnot, mise en scène René Dupuy, Théâtre Gramont
- 1982: Un amour de femme, songs by Michel Rivgauche, music by Gérard Calvi, mise en scène Jean Meyer, Théâtre des Célestins

== Distinctions and awards ==
- Grand prix of the Académie Charles Cros
- Grand prix of the Académie du disque français
- Grand prix of the Président de la République
- Grand prix international du disque
- Officer of the Ordre des Arts et des Lettres
- Médaille de vermeil from the City of Paris
