= Faites-moi confiance =

- Directed by: Gilles Grangier
- Written by: Francis Blanche; Gilles Grangier
- Produced by: Olympic Films
- Starring: Zappy Max; Louis de Funès
- Cinematography: Marc Fossard
- Edited by: Hélène Baste
- Music by: Gérard Calvi
- Distributed by: Compagnie Européenne de Films (CEF)
- Release date: 17 May 1954 (France)
- Running time: 85 minutes
- Countries: France; Italy
- Language: French

Faites-moi confiance (English: Trust in me), is a French comedy film from 1954, directed by Gilles Grangier, written by Francis Blanche, starring Zappy Max and Louis de Funès.

== Plot ==
The unsuccessful illusionist "Happy Max" intends to marry Hélène Bombardon, the daughter of his boss. This news makes Mr Bombardon so upset that he threatens "Happy Max" to fire him unless he finally creates a really successful stage performance.

== Cast ==
- Zappy Max as Happy Max, the unsuccessful illusionist
- André Gabriello as Mr Bombardon, the boss of the music hall
- Jacqueline Noëlle as Gilda
- Francis Blanche as Nicolas
- Jeanne Fusier-Gir as Mrs Créture
- Colette Ripert as Hélène Bombardon, the daughter of the boss
- Jean-Marc Tennberg as Maklouf
- Pierre Larquey as Merlin
- Jérôme Goulven as Charlie
- Robert Rollis as Cliquet
- François Joux as Kodifu
- Jean-Pierre Vaguer as Klakmouf
- Louis Blanche as the baron
- Jean Hebey as Kapok
- Serge Berri or Jacques Marin as Bob
- René Marc as Grégory
- Louis de Funès as Tumlatum
