= Tamara (1938 film) =

1938 film

- Directed by: Jean Delannoy; Félix Gandéra
- Written by: Georges André-Cuel (novel); Jean Delannoy; Félix Gandéra
- Produced by: Félix Gandéra
- Starring: Véra Korène; Victor Francen; Lucas Gridoux
- Cinematography: Nicolas Hayer; Charles Suin
- Edited by: Jean Hénin
- Music by: Georges Auric
- Production company: Productions Félix Gandéra
- Distributed by: Compagnie Française Cinématographique
- Release date: 17 February 1938
- Running time: 87 minutes
- Country: France
- Language: French

Tamara (French: Tamara la complaisante) is a 1938 French drama film directed by Jean Delannoy and Félix Gandéra and starring Véra Korène, Victor Francen and Lucas Gridoux. The film's sets were designed by the art directors Lucien Aguettand and Robert Gys.

== Synopsis ==
Fur trader Grigory is in Siberia to marry his fiancée Lydia, but becomes enthralled by Tamara a peasant girl he encounters. He abandons his fiancée and turns to a life of crime.

== Cast ==
- Véra Korène as Tamara
- Victor Francen as Grigory
- Lucas Gridoux as Mossilieff
- Jacques Berlioz as Torkoff
- Régine Poncet as Lydia
- Colette Darfeuil as Pachenka
- Jeanne Marie-Laurent as Maria Fedorovna
- Joë Hamman as Abenkine
- Maxime Fabert as Padiloff
- Camille Bert as Le chef de la police
- Edmond Beauchamp as Borojski
- André Carnège as Simoën

== Bibliography ==
- Bessy, Maurice & Chirat, Raymond. Histoire du cinéma français: 1935-1939. Pygmalion, 1986.
- Crisp, Colin. Genre, Myth and Convention in the French Cinema, 1929-1939. Indiana University Press, 2002.
- Rège, Philippe. Encyclopedia of French Film Directors, Volume 1. Scarecrow Press, 2009.
