= Alfred Rode =

Italian-born French composer, musician, actor, and film director (1905–1979)

- Born: Alfred Spedaliere; 4 June 1905; Torre del Greco, Campania, Italy
- Died: 22 July 1979 (aged 74); Lisieux, Calvados, France
- Occupations: Director, actor, musician
- Years active: 1931–1962 (film)

Alfred Rode (born Alfred Spedaliere; 4 June 1905 – 22 July 1979) was an Italian-born French composer, musician, actor and film director. He was born in Torre del Greco. In 1936 Rode appeared in the British film Gypsy Melody alongside Lupe Vélez, which was a remake of his own 1935 film Juanita. Rode was married to the French actress Claudine Dupuis in 1951.

== Selected filmography ==
=== Director ===
- The Blue Danube (1940)
- Secret Cargo (1947)
- Nightclub (1951)
- It's the Paris Life (1954)
- Scandal in Montmartre (1955)
- Secret File 1413 (1962)

=== Actor ===
- Carnival (1931)
- The Blue Danube (1932)
- Juanita (1935)
- Antonia (1935)
- Gypsy Melody (1936)
- The Blue Danube (1940)
- Nightclub (1951)
- Tourbillon (1953)
- It's the Paris Life (1954)

== Bibliography ==
- Vogel, Michelle. Lupe Velez: The Life and Career of Hollywood's Mexican Spitfire. McFarland, 2012.
