= First Criminal Brigade =

1962 film by Maurice Boutel

- Directed by: Maurice Boutel
- Written by: Maurice Boutel
- Cinematography: Paul Fabian
- Edited by: Etiennette Muse
- Music by: Philippe Parès; Roger-Roger
- Production company: Cocifrance
- Release date: 2 February 1962
- Running time: 89 minutes
- Country: France
- Language: French

First Criminal Brigade (French: Première brigade criminelle) is a 1962 French crime film directed by Maurice Boutel.

== Cast ==
- Dora Doll as Julia Manton
- Jacques Dumesnil as Commissar Masson
- Jacqueline Joubert as Joelle
- Véronique Silver
- Carl Studer as Motincky
- Howard Vernon as Steven Hals
- Jean Vinci as Mario

== Bibliography ==
- Philippe Rège. Encyclopedia of French Film Directors, Volume 1. Scarecrow Press, 2009.
