= Business (film) =

1960 film

- Directed by: Maurice Boutel
- Written by: Maurice Boutel
- Produced by: Maurice Boutel
- Starring: Colette Renard; Pierre Doris; Marcel Charvey
- Cinematography: Enzo Riccioni
- Edited by: Paul Cayatte
- Music by: Raymond Legrand
- Release date: 13 January 1960
- Running time: 87 minutes
- Country: France
- Language: French

Business is a 1960 French film directed by Maurice Boutel and starring Colette Renard, Pierre Doris and Marcel Charvey.

== Cast ==
- Colette Renard as Léa
- Pierre Doris as Papillon
- Marcel Charvey as Ludovic
- Pauline Carton as Clotilde
- Fernand Sardou as Commissaire Masson
- Junie Astor as L'avocate
- Milly Mathis as Honorine
- Christel Dynel
- Rui Gomes
- Fernand Kindt
- Fernand Molais
- Fernand Rauzéna

== Bibliography ==
- Philippe Rège. Encyclopedia of French Film Directors, Volume 1. Scarecrow Press, 2009.
