= Juanita (1935 film) =

- Directed by: Pierre Caron
- Written by: René Pujol; Alfred Rode
- Produced by: Alfred Rode
- Starring: Mireille Perrey; Alfred Rode; André Berley; Alice Tissot
- Cinematography: Fédote Bourgasoff
- Music by: Alfred Rode
- Production company: Films Alfred Rode
- Release date: 27 September 1935
- Running time: 90 minutes
- Country: France
- Language: French

Juanita is a 1935 French musical comedy film directed by Pierre Caron and starring Mireille Perrey, Alfred Rode and André Berley. The following year it was remade in Britain as Gypsy Melody directed by Edmond T. Gréville and starring Lupe Vélez and Alfred Rode.

== Cast ==
- Mireille Perrey as Juanita
- Alfred Rode as Alex Bratlesco
- André Berley as The King
- Alice Tissot as The Queen
- Raymond Cordy as Pied-Mignon
- Milly Mathis as Giuliana
- Ginette Gaubert as Betty
- Albert Duvaleix as Colonel Bratlesco
- Nane Germon as Elaine Georgesco
- Doumel as Estrapati - l'impresario
- Pierre Dac as Le chef du protocole

== Bibliography ==
- Vogel, Michelle. Lupe Velez: The Life and Career of Hollywood's Mexican Spitfire. McFarland, 2012.
