= Maurice Boutel =

Maurice Boutel (30 July 1923, at Maghnia in Algeria - 5 January 2003 in Saint-Denis, Seine-Saint-Denis) was a French film director, screenwriter and dialoguist.

== Filmography ==
Director

- 1951 : The Case of Doctor Galloy (under his real name Maurice Téboul)
- 1951 : Monsieur Octave
- 1959 : Vice Squad
- 1960 : Interpol Against X
- 1960 : Business
- 1960 : First Criminal Brigade
- 1963 : Prostitution
- 1964 : On Murder Considered as One of the Fine Arts
- 1966 : The Man from Interpol
