= The Knight of the Night =

- Directed by: Robert Darène
- Written by: Jean Anouilh; Robert Dhéry
- Produced by: Adolphe Osso
- Starring: Renée Saint-Cyr; Louis de Funès
- Music by: Jean-Jacques Grünenwald
- Production company: Telouet Films - Zodiaque Productions (France)
- Distributed by: A.G.D.C.
- Release date: 22 November 1953 (France)
- Running time: 88 minutes
- Country: France
- Language: French

The Knight of the Night French: Le Chevalier de la nuit, is a French horror film from 1953, directed by Robert Darène, written by Jean Anouilh, starring Renée Saint-Cyr, Jean-Claude Pascal and Louis de Funès. The film is known under the titles: "Femmes de Paris", "Peek-a-boo" (USA).

== Cast ==
- Renée Saint-Cyr : Bella Fontanges, the dancer
- Jean-Claude Pascal : le chevalier Georges de Ségar and the unknown
- Louis de Funès : Adrien Péréduray, the suit
- Jean Servais : the owner of a manor
- Grégoire Aslan : the prefect of police
- Annette Poivre : Blanche
- François Martin : the viscount of Saint-André, a manager
- Marie-José Darène : girl
- Hubert Noël : Raoul, the young man
- Pierre Destailles : the inspector Leblanc
- Jacques Dufilho : M. Machard, a policeman
- Lily Bontemps : the gommeuse
- Andrée Tainsy : Jeanne, the dresser of Bella
- Charlotte Ecard : the usherette
- Gilbert Edard : the doctor
- Luc Andrieux : the coachman
