= Fruits of Summer =

1955 film directed by Raymond Bernard

- Directed by: Raymond Bernard
- Written by: Raymond Bernard; Philippe Hériat; Jean Marsan
- Produced by: Édouard Harispuru; Günther Stapenhorst
- Starring: Edwige Feuillère; Henri Guisol; Etchika Choureau
- Cinematography: Robert Lefebvre
- Edited by: Raymond Leboursier
- Music by: Francis Lopez
- Production companies: Carlton-Film; Compagnie Commerciale Française Cinématographique; Neue Filmverleih
- Distributed by: Compagnie Commerciale Française Cinématographique
- Release date: 11 February 1955
- Running time: 105 minutes
- Countries: France; West Germany
- Language: French

Fruits of Summer (French: Les fruits de l'été) is a 1955 French-West German comedy film directed by Raymond Bernard and starring Edwige Feuillère, Henri Guisol and Etchika Choureau. It was shot at the Boulogne Studios in Paris. The film's sets were designed by the art directors André Bakst and Léon Barsacq, with costumes by Pierre Balmain.

== Cast ==
- Edwige Feuillère as Sabine Gravières
- Henri Guisol as Edouard Gravières
- Etchika Choureau as Juliette Gravières
- Pauline Carton as Mélanie
- Jeanne Fusier-Gir as Mademoiselle
- Claude Nicot as Claude
- Philippe Olive as Le président
- Simone Paris as Lili
- Roger Coggio as Partygoer
- Jacques Ciron as Partygoer

== Bibliography ==
- Faulkner, Sally (ed.) Middlebrow Cinema. Routledge, 2016.
- Rège, Philippe. Encyclopedia of French Film Directors, Volume 1. Scarecrow Press, 2009.
