= The Case of Doctor Galloy =

1951 film

- Directed by: Maurice Boutel
- Written by: Maurice Boutel
- Starring: Jean-Pierre Kérien; Henri Rollan; Suzy Prim
- Cinematography: Pierre Petit
- Edited by: Georges Alépée
- Production company: Metronome Films
- Distributed by: Societe d'Edition et de Location de Films
- Release date: 20 June 1951
- Running time: 95 minutes
- Country: France
- Language: French

The Case of Doctor Galloy (French: Le cas du docteur Galloy) is a 1951 French drama film directed by Maurice Boutel and starring Jean-Pierre Kérien, Henri Rollan and Suzy Prim.

== Cast ==
- Jean-Pierre Kérien as Le docteur Galloy
- Henri Rollan as Le professeur
- Suzy Prim as L'amie de Mme Guérin
- Lucienne Le Marchand as Mme Guérin
- Louis Seigner as Le docteur Clarenz
- Lucas Gridoux as Le guérisseur
- Andrews Engelmann
- André Le Gall
- Juliette Faber
- Jacqueline Pierreux

== Bibliography ==
- Philippe Rège. Encyclopedia of French Film Directors, Volume 1. Scarecrow Press, 2009.
