= Double Crime in the Maginot Line =

1937 film

- Directed by: Félix Gandéra
- Written by: Robert Bibal; Félix Gandéra
- Based on: Double Crime in the Maginot Line by Pierre Nord
- Produced by: Félix Gandéra
- Starring: Victor Francen; Véra Korène; Jacques Baumer
- Cinematography: Nicolas Hayer; Marcel Villet
- Edited by: Eliane Bensdorp
- Music by: Jean Lenoir
- Production company: Productions Félix Gandéra
- Distributed by: Compagnie Française Cinématographique
- Release date: 24 September 1937
- Running time: 101 minutes
- Country: France
- Language: French

Double Crime in the Maginot Line (French: Double crime sur la ligne Maginot) is a 1937 mystery crime film directed by Félix Gandéra and starring Victor Francen, Véra Korène and Jacques Baumer. It was shot at the Billancourt Studios in Paris. The film's sets were designed by the art director Robert Gys. The film was based on the 1936 novel of the same title by Pierre Nord. It was a popular success, partly due to increasing concerns about a future war with Nazi Germany.

== Synopsis ==
While serving in the Maginot Line, the great fortifications along the border with Germany designed to deter an invasion, Captain Bruchot quarrels with his superior Commandant D'Espinac. When D'Espinac is murdered the next day Bruchot is the obvious suspect. He works to clear his name with the investigation officer Inspector Finois. It appears that only three other men could possibly have committed the crime, one of whom may be a German secret agent.

== Cast ==
- Victor Francen as Capitaine Bruchot
- Véra Korène as Anna Bruchot
- Jacques Baumer as Inspecteur Finois
- Henri Guisol as Lieutenant Capelle
- Fernand Fabre as Commandant d'Espinac
- Pierre Magnier as Le colonel
- Jacques Berlioz as Commandant Malatre
- Georges Spanelly as Lennard
- Geymond Vital as Lieutenant Le Guenn
- Albert Weiss as Lieutenant Kuntz
- Jacques Vitry as Magistrat
- Maxime Fabert as Gunsmith
- Jean Daurand as un soldat
- Robert Seller as le médecin légiste

== Bibliography ==
- Bessy, Maurice & Chirat, Raymond. Histoire du cinéma français: 1935-1939. Pygmalion, 1986.
- Crisp, Colin. French Cinema—A Critical Filmography: Volume 1, 1929–1939. Indiana University Press, 2015.
- Nowell-Smith, Geoffrey. The Oxford History of World Cinema. Oxford University Press, 1996.
- Rège, Philippe. Encyclopedia of French Film Directors, Volume 1. Scarecrow Press, 2009.
- Turk, Edward Baron . Child of Paradise: Marcel Carné and the Golden Age of French Cinema. Harvard University Press, 1989.
