= Claudine Dupuis =

French actress

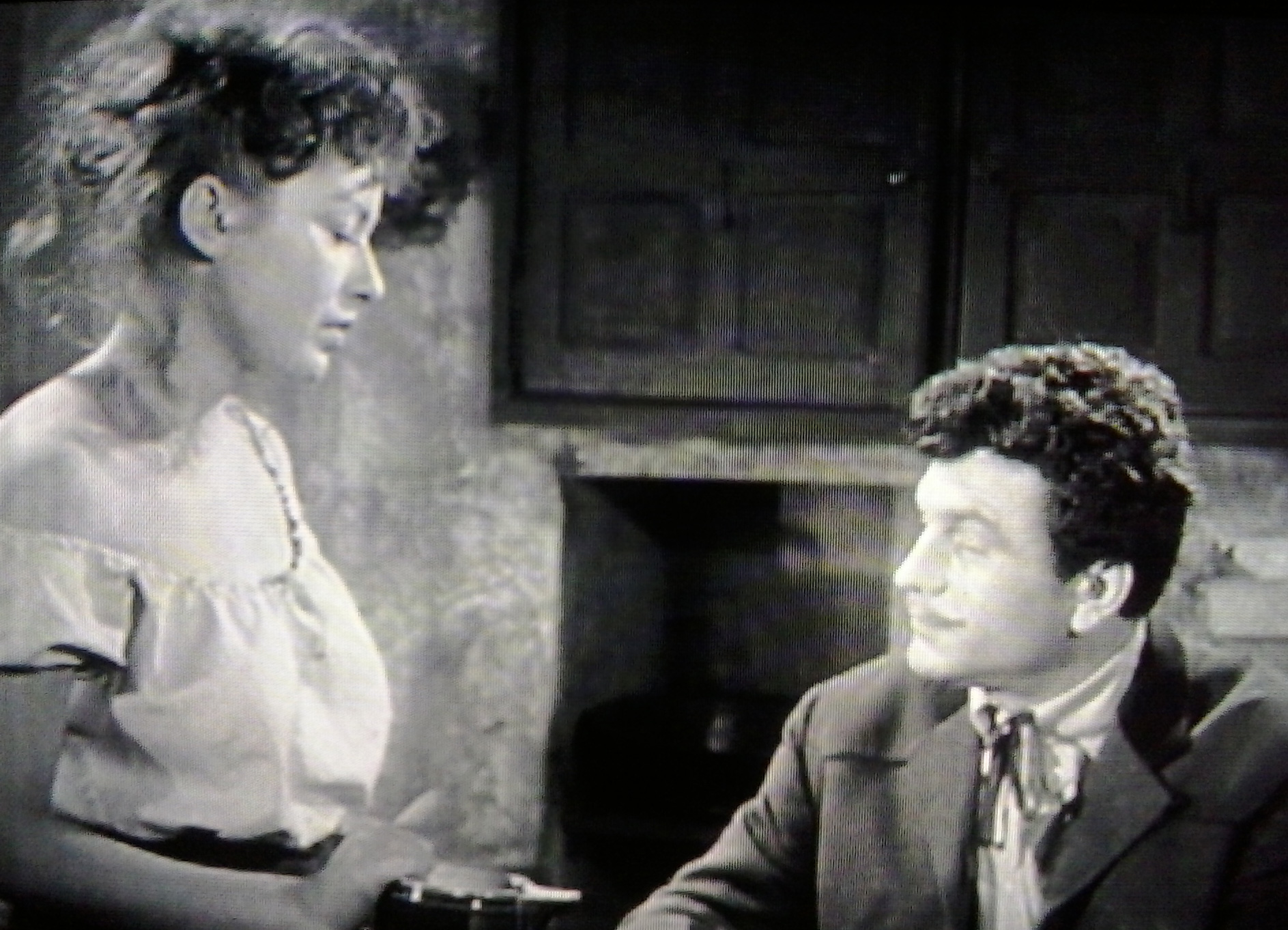
Henri Vidal (Antonio) and Claudine Dupuis. A scene from the episode "The Gluttony" The Seven Deadly Sins (1952)

Claudine Dupuis (born Andrée Esther Chaloum; 1 May 1924 in Paris – 26 May 1991 in Lisieux) was a French actress. She starred as the "garrulous prostitute Manon" in Henri-Georges Clouzot's Quai des Orfèvres in 1947. Other films include The Fighting Men (1950), Il bivio (1951), The Babes Make the Law (1955), La fierecilla domada (1956) and Cuatro en la frontera (1958). She was married to Alfred Rode from 1951.

== Selected filmography ==
- François Villon (1945)
- Devil and the Angel (1946)
- Secret Cargo (1947)
- Monsieur Wens Holds the Trump Cards (1947)
- The Crossroads (1951)
- Nightclub (1951)
- It's the Paris Life (1954)
- Ball of Nations (1954)
- The Lost Girl (1954)
- The Babes Make the Law (1955)
- Scandal in Montmartre (1955)
- Beatrice Cenci (1956)
- The Babes in the Secret Service (1956)
