= The Amorous Corporal =

1958 film

- Directed by: Robert Darène
- Written by: Gabriel Arout; Robert Darène
- Based on: the novel La Bigorne, caporal de France by Pierre Nord,
- Starring: François Périer; Rossana Podestà
- Cinematography: Pierre Lhomme; Marcel Weiss
- Music by: Guy Magenta
- Release date: 1958
- Language: French

The Amorous Corporal (French: La Bigorne, caporal de France) is a 1958 French adventure-comedy film co-written and directed by Robert Darène. Loosely based on the novel La Bigorne, caporal de France by Pierre Nord, it is set in eighteenth-century Madagascar.

It was the first cinematography credit for Pierre Lhomme.

It aired on cable TV in the US in 1973 as part of a package of non-English language movies called "Movies for Swingers".

== Cast ==
- François Périer as La Bigorne
- Rossana Podestà as Bethi
- Robert Hirsch as Boisrose
- Jean Lefebvre as Potirond
- Jean Carmet as Balluché
- Henri Cogan as Tom Wright

== Reception ==
The film has been widely criticized for its apologetic tones towards colonialism.
