= Félix Gandéra =

French film director (1885–1957)

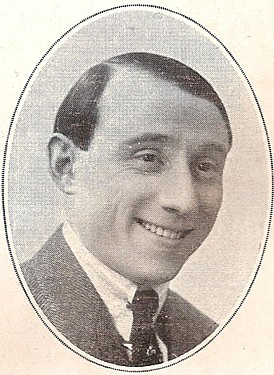
- Gandéra in 1915.
- Born: 17 February 1885; Paris, France
- Died: 15 December 1885 (aged 0); Bougival, Yvelines, France
- Occupations: Actor, director, screenwriter
- Years active: 1911–1956 (film)

Félix Gandéra (1885–1957) was a French actor, screenwriter and film director. He appeared in silent films from 1911 onwards, but most focused on the stage. A number of his plays were adapted for the screen, and he returned to cinema as a screenwriter and film director from the early 1930s.

== Selected filmography ==
- Quick (1932)
- Nicole and Her Virtue (1932)
- The Mad Night (1932)
- One Night's Secret (1934)
- The Mysteries of Paris (1935)
- Double Crime in the Maginot Line (1937)
- Tamara (1938)
- Arlette and Love (1943)
- L'Amour, Madame (1952)

== Bibliography ==
- Rège, Philippe. Encyclopedia of French Film Directors, Volume 1. Scarecrow Press, 2009.
- Roust, Colin. Georges Auric: A Life in Music and Politics. Oxford University Press, 2020.
