= Robert Darène =

French actor

- Born: 10 January 1914
- Died: 15 January 2016 (aged 102)
- Occupations: Actor, film director, screenwriter
- Years active: 1934–1963

Robert Darène (10 January 1914 – 15 January 2016) was a French actor, film director and screenwriter. He appeared in twelve films between 1934 and 1959, and directed nine films between 1951 and 1963.

== Selected filmography ==
- Le Chevalier de la nuit (1953)
- Goubbiah, mon amour (1956)
- The Amorous Corporal (1958)
- The Cage (1963)

== See also ==
- List of centenarians (actors, filmmakers and entertainers)
