= False Identity (1947 film) =

1947 film

- Directed by: André Chotin
- Written by: Pierre Brive; René Jolivet
- Produced by: Sacha Kamenka
- Starring: Louise Carletti; Georges Rollin; Raymond Bussières
- Cinematography: Jean Lehérissey; Pierre Petit
- Music by: Henri Forterre
- Production company: Maîtrise Artisanale de l'Industrie Cinématographique
- Distributed by: L'Alliance Générale de Distribution Cinématographique
- Release date: 6 December 1947
- Running time: 93 minutes
- Country: France
- Language: French

False Identity (French: Fausse identité) is a 1947 French crime film directed by André Chotin and starring Louise Carletti, Georges Rollin and Raymond Bussières. The film's sets were designed by the art director Jean Douarinou.

== Synopsis ==
A tramp is knocked down by a car and killed. However, when police investigate they discover that the coat he was wearing belongs to a wealthy lawyer who has just been murdered. His various relatives all come under suspicion.

== Cast ==
- Louise Carletti as Juliette
- Georges Rollin as François
- Raymond Bussières as Achille
- Frank Villard as L'inspecteur Rolle
- Maurice Salabert as Malaval
- Simone Deguyse as Gaby
- Marie Bizet as Une ouvrière
- Marcel Maupi as Un clochard
- Pierre Sergeol as Le notaire
- Jacques Henley as Le directeur de la banque
- Henri Nassiet as Georges Blondin
- Renée Devillers as Lucie Blondin
- Léonce Corne as Le commissaire

== Bibliography ==
- Rège, Philippe. Encyclopedia of French Film Directors, Volume 1. Scarecrow Press, 2009.
