= Léo Marciano =

French luxury fashion house

Leo Marciano Paris
- Company type: Société Anonyme
- Industry: Fashion
- Founded: 1966 (60 years ago)
- Founder: Leo Marciano
- Headquarters: Paris, France
- Area served: Worldwide
- Products: Luxury goods

Léo Marciano Paris is a French luxury fashion house founded in 1966 by the eponymous designer Léo Marciano.

The house designed and retailed ready-to-wear and couture as well as leather goods, footwear and fashion accessories. While the Léo Marciano label is predominantly known for its womenswear, the company also ran a menswear line. The house had a notable following in France and Japan and was internationally distributed through its portfolio of retail stores.

== History ==
The brand was founded by Algerian-born French couturier Léo Marciano in 1966.

Trained in industrial design, Léo Marciano began a teaching career in drawing before shifting his direction towards garment design and opening his eponymous fashion house.

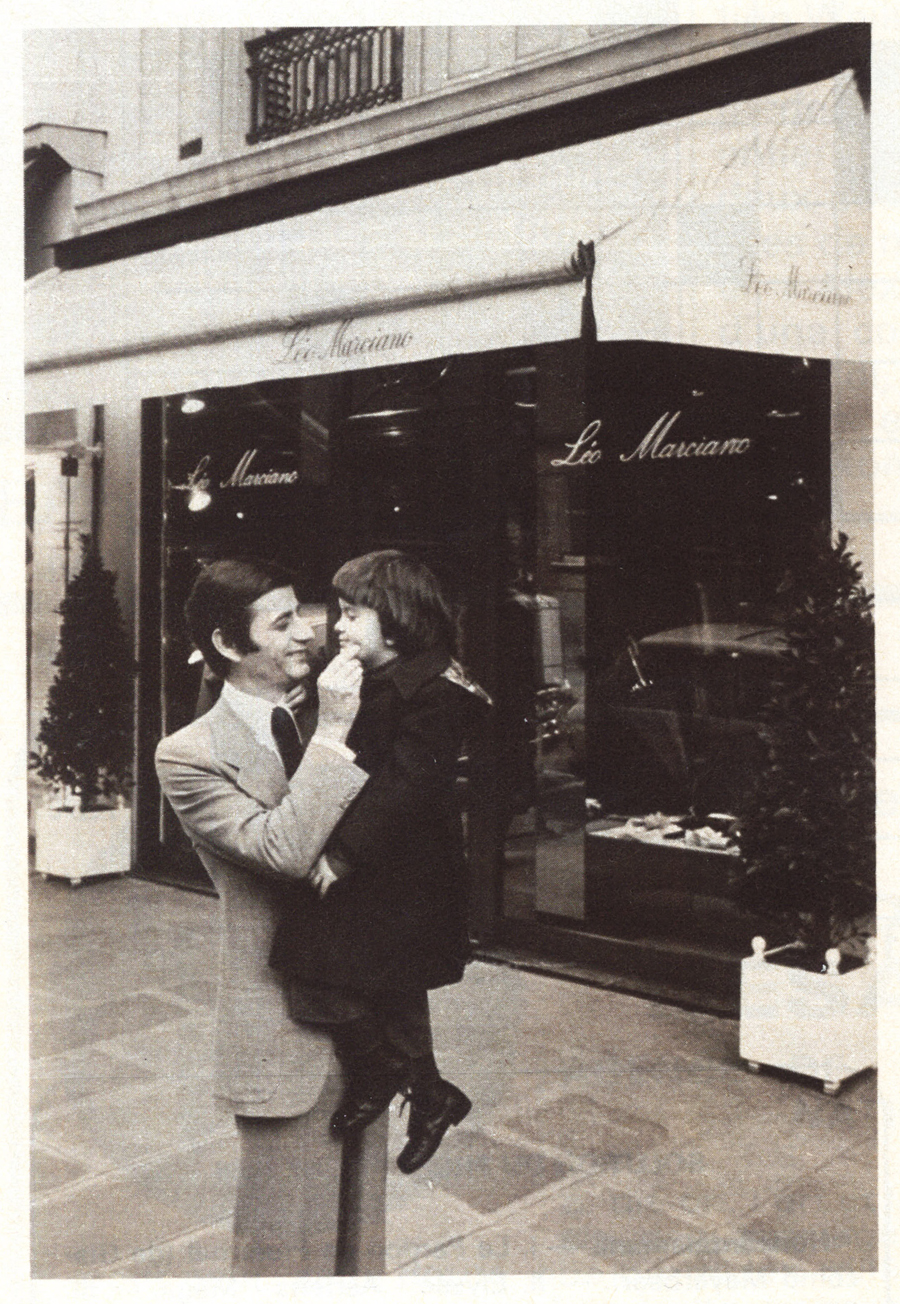
Léo Marciano in front of his boutique at rue du Faubourg Saint-Honoré

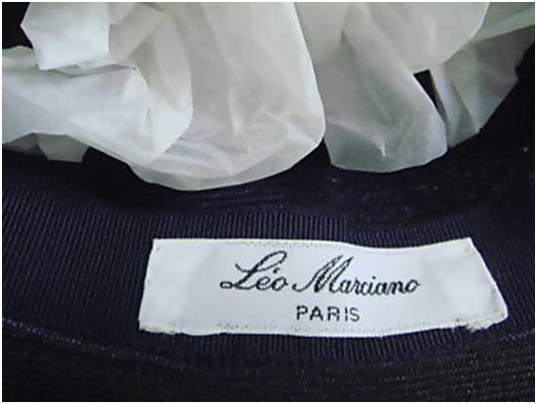
Léo Marciano label

Beginning with the creation of feminine silhouettes, notably dresses and blouses, his first pieces saw success among Paris’ boutiques and abroad.

The press developed an increased interest in his creations as they became more elaborate and began to constitute collections of coordinates in Italian silks and exclusive prints, fine wools and English tweeds and flannels. The French weekly "Jours de France" contributed to his success when it published his work.

By 1972, the company had significantly grown, and orders were coming from all over the world. Rather than outsourcing to factories, Léo Marciano decided to build his own production atelier to fulfil orders and control the quality of his product line. In this atelier of over one hundred employees, he created a research space, using machinery to service a manufacturing.

Léo Marciano was granted the "Couture" label by the French Ministry of Industry and Commerce, and became established in the luxury market.

In the following years, the luxury brand expanded and saw the opening of freestanding Léo Marciano boutiques at some of the most prestigious addresses in Paris, including rue du Faubourg Saint-Honoré, rue Cambon, and rue François 1er. The label moved beyond its French borders as stand-alone stores and concessions opened internationally.

In Paris, Léo Marciano became the couturier of choice of women in politics; abroad, he dressed women in power notably Margaret Thatcher and Empress Farah Diba, as well as Princess Caroline de Monaco and a number of actresses such as the star of Orfeu Negro, Marpessa Dawn and Anny Duperey.

He collaborated with renowned photographers such as Guy Bourdin, Peter Knapp, Sam Levin, and Jean-Loup Sieff for the creation of the label’s look books and ad campaigns.

== Japan ==
The Léo Marciano brand was established in Japan with the help of French multinational Péchiney Ugine Kuhlmann (PUK), which offered the brand the support needed to successfully develop commercial activities in Tokyo.

In 1978, thirty-five boutiques opened throughout the country.

Léo Marciano was the first European couturier to do business directly with Japan without having to go through the local intermediaries that controlled imports at the time.

In Japan, he had the opportunity to work on the development and innovation of new materials. Commissioned by the Japanese multinational Toray, he collaborated on the development of a new material – alcantara – which he proceeded to use in his collections. Today, this material is world renowned and used in fashion, interior design, and even the automotive industry.

== Menswear ==
In 1982, Léo Marciano launched a menswear line. The collection was introduced in its womenswear stores, which began to carry both lines. The interest grew rapidly and a Léo Marciano stand alone menswear shop opened on rue Francois 1er. The menswear line was produced by Italian tailoring company Brioni. The menswear boutique went even further by offering a made to measure tailoring service.

== End of activities ==
In 1985, Léo Marciano ceased his activities for health reasons and closed the doors of the prosperous fashion house.
