= Enzo Riccioni =

Italian cinematographer

- Occupation: Cinematographer
- Years active: 1918 – 1963 (film)

Enzo Riccioni was an Italian cinematographer. He worked on more than eighty films in Italy and France during a lengthy career.

== Selected filmography ==
- Lady Harrington (1926)
- Miss Helyett (1928)
- Sunday of Life (1931)
- Longing for the Sea (1931)
- The Concert (1931)
- The Devil's Holiday (1931)
- The Leap into the Void (1932)
- The Red Robe (1933)
- Fifty Fathoms Deep (1932)
- Criminal (1933)
- The Agony of the Eagles (1933)
- Prince Jean (1934)
- I Have an Idea (1934)
- The Hortensia Sisters (1935)
- Dora Nelson (1935)
- Vertigo (1935)
- 27 Rue de la Paix (1936)
- The Woman from the End of the World (1938)
- Alexis, Gentleman Chauffeur (1938)
- Latin Quarter (1939)
- The Blue Danube (1940)
- Fortunato (1942)
- Fever (1943)
- Three Boys, One Girl (1948)
- Mystery in Shanghai (1950)
- Nightclub (1951)
- Naked in the Wind (1953)
- Vice Squad (1959)
- Interpol Against X (1960)
- Business (1960)
- Prostitution (1963)

== Bibliography ==
- Phil Powrie & Éric Rebillard. Pierre Batcheff and Stardom in 1920s French Cinema. Edinburgh University Press, 2009.
