= L'Homme à l'Hispano =

L'Homme à l'Hispano may refer to:

- L'Homme à l'Hispano, a 1925 French novel written by Pierre Frondaie
- The Man with the Hispano (1926 film), a French film adaptation directed by Julien Duvivier
- The Man with the Hispano (1933 film), a French film adaptation directed by Jean Epstein
