= A Man's Neck =

A Man's Neck may refer to:

- A Battle of Nerves (a.k.a. A Man's Neck), a 1931 French detective novel by Belgian writer Georges Simenon
- A Man's Neck (film), 1933 French crime film adaptation of the novel directed by Julien Duvivier
