= The Man with the Hispano =

The Man with the Hispano may refer to:

- The Man with the Hispano (1926 film), a French silent drama film
- The Man with the Hispano (1933 film), a French drama film
