= Prince Jean =

Prince Jean may refer to:

- Prince Jean (1928 film), a French silent film
- Prince Jean (1934 film), a French drama film
- Prince Jean, Duke of Guise (1874–1940), Orléanist claimant to the throne of France as Jean III
- Prince Jean of Luxembourg (born 1957)
