= Graziella =

1852 novel by Alphonse de Lamartine

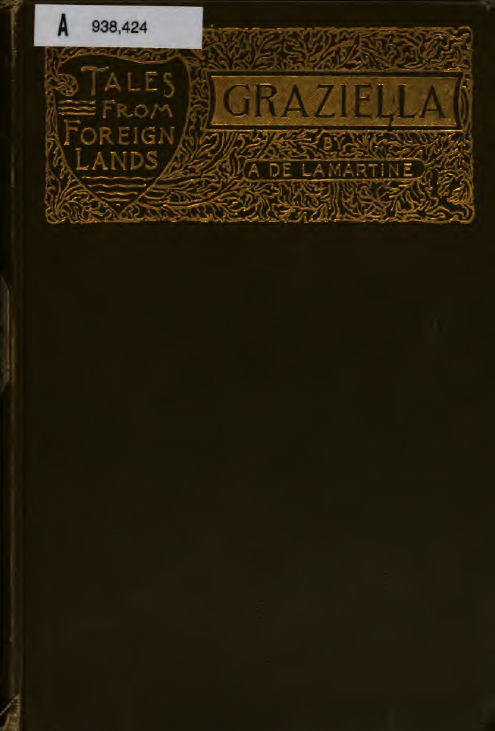
- Cover, 1905 English edition
- Author: Alphonse de Lamartine
- Translator: James Runnion
- Language: French
- Set in: Naples and surrounding area
- Published: 1849 (serialized as part of Les Confidences; La Presse); 1852 (collected as a novel; Librairie Nouvelle)
- Publication place: France
- English publication date: 1875
- Pages: 119 (first edition)
- OCLC: 78282173
- Original text: Graziella at French Wikisource
- Translation: Graziella online

Graziella is an 1852 novel by the French author Alphonse de Lamartine. It tells of a young French man who falls for a fisherman's granddaughter – the eponymous Graziella – during a trip to Naples, Italy; they are separated when he must return to France, and she soon dies. Based on the author's experiences with a tobacco-leaf folder while in Naples in the early 1810s, Graziella was first written as a journal and intended to serve as commentary for Lamartine's poem "Le Premier Regret".

First serialised as part of Les Confidences beginning in 1849, Graziella received popular acclaim. An operatic adaptation had been completed by the end of the year, and the work influenced paintings, poems, novels, and films. The American literary critic Charles Henry Conrad Wright considered it one of the three most important emotionalist French novels, the others being Bernardin de Saint-Pierre's novel Paul et Virginie (1788) and Chateaubriand's novella Atala (1801). Three English translations have been published: one by James Runnion in 1875, one by Ralph Wright in 1929, and one by Raymond N. MacKenzie in 2018.

== Plot ==
The eighteen-year-old narrator travels from his home in Mâcon, Burgundy, to Italy, staying first in Rome, then Naples. There he meets a young man named Aymon de Virieu, and the two decide to apprentice themselves to Andrea, a local fisherman. Although the first few months pass in contemplative tranquility and beauty, they are forced to take refuge at Andrea's home on Procida during a surging September storm, where they spend the night. Here the narrator first meets the fisherman's granddaughter, Graziella.

The following morning, the narrator overhears Andrea's wife, criticising him for taking on the two "pagan" Frenchmen. However, Graziella comes to their defense, silencing her grandmother by pointing out the two young men's compassion and religious acts. The family and their apprentices go to recover the remnants of the destroyed boat. Soon afterwards, the narrator and Virieu go to the village, where they purchase a new boat and fishing supplies for the fisherman. When they return, Andrea and his family are sleeping, but are soon awoken and brought to the beach, joyously accepting the new vessel.

Over the next several days, the narrator and Virieu enjoy an idyllic life, reading, walking, and enjoying the beauty, music, and dance of Procida. Graziella expresses interest in their reading, and thus the men read works by Ugo Foscolo and Tacitus to her and her family. Though these fall flat, all are interested in Jacques-Henri Bernardin de Saint-Pierre's romantic novel Paul et Virginie. Such is Graziella's fascination with the tale that she abandons all reserve and sits near the narrator, her breath on his hand, and her hair brushing his forehead. When it is over, she begs the narrator to reread the tale.

The poor weather breaks on the ninth day, and Andrea takes the young men and his family to Naples. Virieu is recalled to France, and the narrator falls ill from sorrow over his friend's departure. He sends for Andrea, and Graziella rushes to his lodging, where she treats him. Their conversation, and Graziella's care, revives the narrator's spirits. Reinvigorated, the next day, he goes to Andrea's Neapolitan lodgings in Mergellina. Since coming to the city, he learns of their fortunes: Andrea and his wife are enjoying bountiful catches, while Graziella has taken up coral carving to earn extra money. When the narrator appears unhappy to leave, they ask him to lodge with them.

Months pass, and the narrator considers Andrea's family to be his own. The narrator attempts to treat Graziella as a sister. He accompanies her to church and teaches her to read and write, and she insists that he spend more time with her, talking and learning to carve coral than futilely writing poetry. However, he realizes the extent of his affection for her when, days before Christmas, Graziella is arranged to be married to her cousin Cecco: "My life without her presence was nothing". The imminent loss of Graziella drives the narrator to abandon Naples and wander the surrounding area, returning only after the new year.

Though Graziella accepts the proposed marriage on the day the narrator returns, she later escapes into the night, intent on joining a convent. The following day the family search for her in vain. Eventually, the narrator realizes that she must have returned to Procida and hurries there. In Andrea's home, he finds Graziella, who confesses her love for him, stating, "They wished me to take a husband—you are already the husband of my soul". The narrator replies in kind, and they spend the night together, discussing their romance. When Graziella's family comes to get her, they decide that she need not marry Cecco.

For three months, they enjoy their love, unknown to Graziella's family. However, she is pained at the thought of the narrator returning to France and by her social station, much beneath the narrator's own. When the narrator is recalled to France, Graziella collapses on the doorstep, and the narrator – though downhearted – cannot stay. Although they continue to exchange letters, once in French society, the narrator feels ashamed of his love for the poor fisherman's granddaughter. He only realizes his folly after learning of Graziella's death at age sixteen. The novel closes with a poem, "Le Premier Regret" ("The First Regret"), dedicated to her memory.

== Writing and publication ==
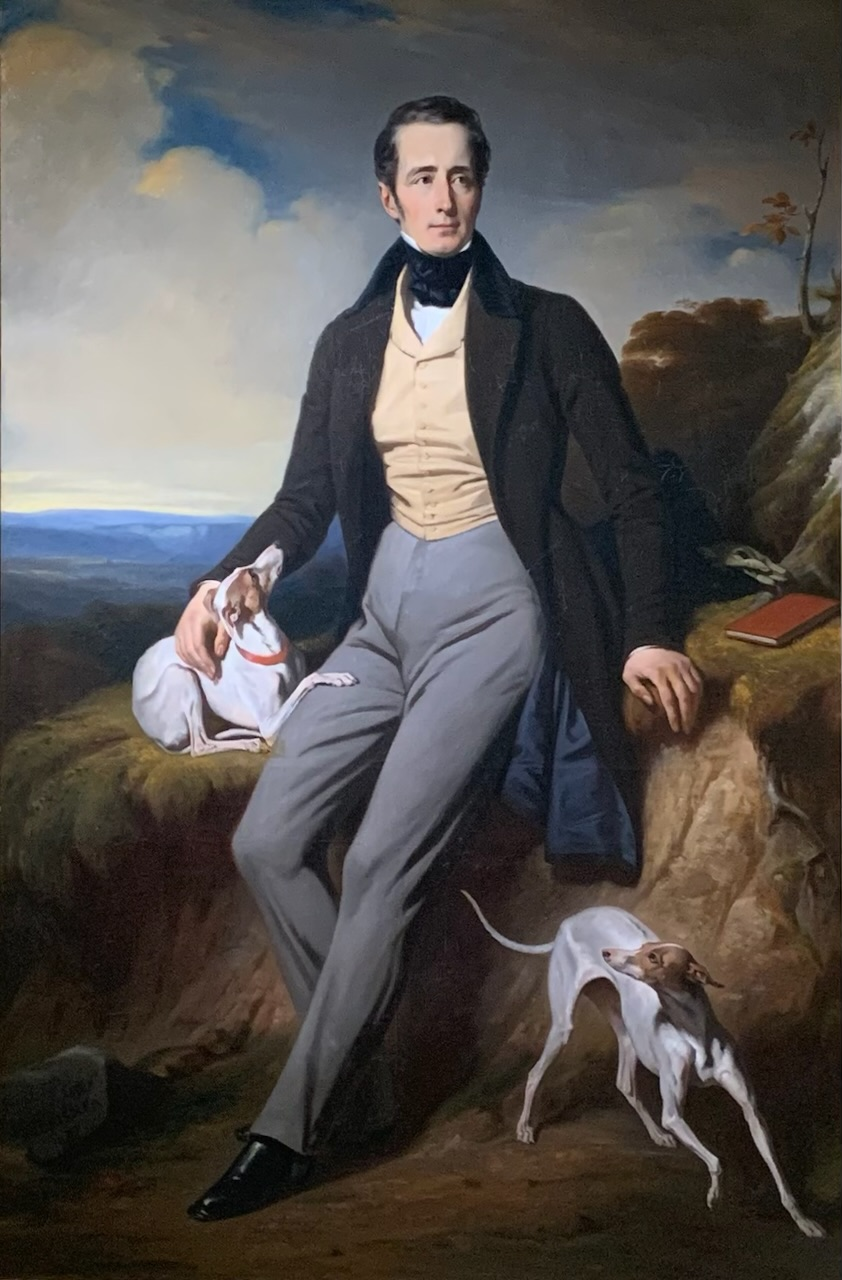
Alphonse de Lamartine, the author, by Henri Decaisne

Graziella was written by Alphonse de Lamartine, a French poet and novelist. As a young man, in 1812 Lamartine had visited Italy, travelling from his home near Mâcon to an abbey in Cluny, then onwards to Naples and Rome. During his time in Naples, Lamartine stayed with Darest de la Chavanne, who owned a cigar factory. There, he met a young woman from Procida, a tobacco-leaf folder with whom he began a relationship, and with whom he may have been intimate. The young woman died after Lamartine's return to France; the writer Agide Pirazzini suggests that he truly loved her only after her death and that thenceforth her image never left him.

His experiences with the young tobacco-leaf folder were a potent inspiration for Lamartine; Pirazzini suggests that several works, including "Le Passé" ('The Past') and "L'Hymne au soleil" ('Hymn to the Sun'), were written in her memory. Lamartine's experiences also formed the basis of his poem "Le Premier Regret", a mournful elegy focusing on an overgrown tomb of an unnamed yet still beloved Italian woman. First published in his Harmonies poétiques et religieuses (1830), it was later included in the novel Graziella. Lamartine later wrote a journal describing his experiences in Italy, completing the tale in 1843, and was considering telling the tale of Graziella as commentary to "Le Premier Regret".

In the early 1840s, Lamartine's friend Eugène Pelletan visited the author in Ischia and was read several pages of the journal. Touched by the story, when Pelletan returned to Paris, he recommended that a French company publish the recollections, which he was certain would find popularity. The publisher agreed, and although the financially troubled author at first refused, when faced with selling his family home Lamartine agreed to publish. Les Confidences, based on Lamartine's journal, was serialized beginning on 2 January 1849 in La Presse. The girl with whom Lamartine was smitten in Italy was presented through the character of Graziella. The author depicted as working in coral, hoping to "avoid the degrading association which an open avowal of her employment [as a tobacco-leaf folder] would suggest". He would, however, later regret this change.

Graziella's story in Les Confidences, which consisted of half its length, was collected and published in a separate edition beginning in 1852. The novel was a popular hit upon its release. By 1853 a Spanish-language edition was being advertised; several other translations in that language were published before 1919. By 1875 James Runnion had translated it into English; this translation was published by the Chicago-based A. C. McClurg and Company under the title Graziella: A Story of Italian Love. Another edition, titled simply Graziella, was translated by Ralph Wright and published by Nonesuch Press of London in 1929. This version included 30 illustrations.

== Analysis ==
In 1871, a writer in the Westminster Review described the change from the tobacco-leaf folder to coral carver as the "sole deviation from fact" in Graziella. Four years later, Runnion described the novel as "a leaf torn from [the author's] personal memoires". Pirazzini, writing in 1917, noted inaccuracies, such as Lamartine's age during the trip to Italy (eighteen in the novel, early twenties in reality), but considered them of little relevance, as his memories were "surrounded with light and poetry". Since then, Henri Guillemin of the Encyclopædia Britannica finds Les Confidences to mix reality and imagination, and the writer Terence Cave has described the work as only "remotely autobiographical".

The beauty of Southern Italy was often shown in Lamartine's works, such as in Graziella. Pirazzini describes Lamartine's descriptions as "splendid ... like a hymn, though the form is prose".

The writer Nathalie Léger finds a "homological relationship" between Graziella and Saint-Pierre's Paul et Virginie (1788). She suggests that the texts both resolve around tensions of island paradises and societal hell as well as a "professed pure, brotherly love", ending with the death of a character. She notes describes Paul et Virginie as appearing en abyme within Lamartine's novel, as it is Saint-Pierre's romance which "awakens Graziella's passion".

== Reception ==
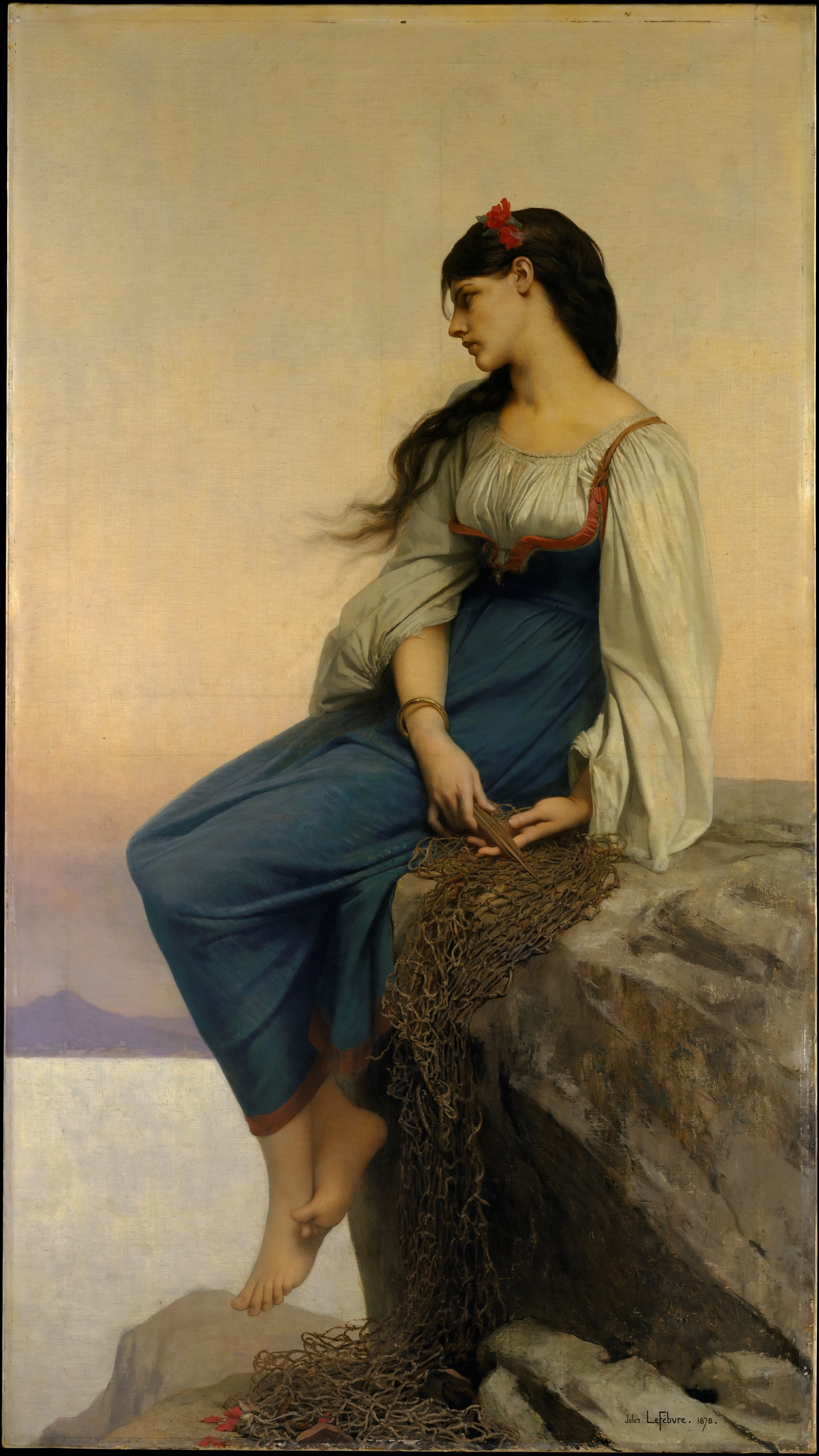
The title character, as depicted by Jules Joseph Lefebvre (1878)

=== Critical ===
The American literary critic Charles Henry Conrad Wright, writing in 1912, considered Graziella the best of the episodes presented in Les Confidences. He thought it one of three novels that must be read to understand the development of emotionalism in French literature, together with Saint-Pierre's Paul et Virginie and François-René de Chateaubriand's novella Atala (1801).

=== Cultural ===
Graziella quickly became a part of the French popular culture. On 20 January 1849, librettists Jules Barbier and Michel Carré debuted their one-act adaptation of the story at the Théâtre du Gymnase in Paris.

A reference to the ill-fated Graziella can be found in Jules-Romain Tardieu's 1857 novel Mignon, légende, which features a sculptor's daughter named Graziella. The novel states that her father, Marx, took "his cue from one of Lamartine's most poetic stories" (Note: Original: "en s'inspirant d'un des plus poétique récits de Lamartine!" Translation by Cave (2011, p. 103).) in naming her. The French poet Tristan Corbière, having met a man who claimed to be the son of Lamartine and Graziella while in Italy in 1869, wrote a poem titled "Le fils de Lamartine et Graziella" ('The Son of Lamartine and Graziella'). The poem, published in Corbière's 1873 collection Les amours jaunes, has been interpreted by André Le Milinaire as condemning the falsity of family life.

Graziella's title character was depicted by the French artist Jules Joseph Lefebvre in an 1878 oil painting on canvas. Commissioned by the art collector Catharine Lorillard Wolfe, the work depicts Graziella sitting on a rock, fishing net in hand, gazing over her shoulders at a smoking Mount Vesuvius. The painting is now at the Metropolitan Museum of Art in New York, New York. Another painting, Graziella di Lamartine, was completed by Neapolitan artist Ferdinando Ruggieri and a sculpture by Cesare Aureli, depicting a scene where Graziella cuts her hair as a sacrifice to the Virgin Mary is also recorded.

Graziella has been thrice adapted to film. The first production, in 1917, was directed by Mario Gargiulo. The second, in 1926, was made by Marcel Vandal. The third was completed in 1954 by Giorgio Bianchi. This last production, which starred Maria Fiore in the title role and Jean-Pierre Mocky as the Frenchman Alphonse, was distributed by CEI Incom.

== Works cited ==
- Birkett, Mary Ellen (1985). "Lamartine's "Le Premier Regret": Manuscript, Poem, Commentary". Kentucky Romance Quarterly. 32 (4): 341–46. doi:10.1080/03648664.1985.9928319. ISSN 0023-0332.
- Caldiron, Orio; Hochkofler, Matilde, eds. (1988). Scrivere il cinema: Suso Cecchi d'Amico [Writing Cinema: Suso Cecchi d'Amico] (in Italian). Bari: Edizioni Dedalo. ISBN 978-88-220-4529-4.
- Cave, Terence (2011). Mignon's Afterlives: Crossing Cultures from Goethe to the Twenty-first Century. Oxford: Oxford University Press. ISBN 978-0-19-960480-7.
- Goble, Alan, ed. (1999). The Complete Index to Literary Sources in Film. London: Bowker-Saur. ISBN 978-1-85739-229-6.
- "Graziella". Metropolitan Museum of Art. Archived from the original on 30 March 2015.
- Graziella. WorldCat. OCLC 561601121.
- De Gubernatis, Angelo; Matini, Ugo, eds. (1889). Dizionario degli Artisti Italiani Viventi, Pittori, Scultori e Architetti [Dictionary of Living Italian Artists: Painters, Sculptors, and Architects] (in Italian). Firenze: Tipi dei successori Le Monnier. OCLC 9671299.
- Guillemin, Angelo (22 September 2013). "Alphonse de Lamartine". Encyclopædia Britannica. Archived from the original on 26 April 2015.
- "History and Biography". Westminster Review. XL. July–October 1871. ISSN 2044-6853.
- de Lamartine, Alphonse (1894) [1875]. Graziella: A Story of Italian Love. Chicago: A. C. McGlurg and Company. OCLC 679809836.
- Léger, Nathalie (2011). "Footnote 33". The Preparation of the Novel: Lecture Courses and Seminars at the Collège de France, 1978–1979 and 1979–1980. European perspectives. New York: Columbia University Press. pp. 426–27. ISBN 978-0-231-13614-3.
- Le Milinaire, André (1989). Tristan Corbière: La Paresse et le Génie [Tristan Corbière: Laziness and Genius] (in French). Seyssel: Champ Vallon. ISBN 978-2-87673-048-9.
- Peers, E. Allison (December 1922). "The Fortunes of Lamartine in Spain". Modern Language Notes. 37 (8): 458–465. ISSN 0026-7910. JSTOR 2914862.
- Pirazzini, Agide (1917). The Influence of Italy on the Literary Career of Alphonse de Lamartine. Columbia University studies in Romance philology and literature. Vol. 21. New York: Columbia University Press. OCLC 576228713.
- Runnion, James (1894) [1875]. "Translator's Note". Graziella: A Story of Italian Love. Chicago: A. C. McGlurg and Company. OCLC 679809836.
- Sala, Emilio (2013). The Sounds of Paris in Verdi's La Traviata. Cambridge studies in opera. New York: Cambridge University Press. ISBN 978-1-107-00901-1.
- Wright, Charles (1912). A History of French Literature. Vol. 2. New York: Haskell. OCLC 633285383.
