= Le Bal (1931 film) =

1931 film

- Directed by: Wilhelm Thiele
- Produced by: Charles Delac; Marcel Vandal; Simon Schiffrin (line producer)
- Cinematography: Nicolas Farkas; Armand Thirard
- Music by: Werner R. Heymann
- Production company: Les Films Marcel Vandal et Charles Delac
- Release date: 11 September 1931
- Running time: 75 minutes
- Country: France
- Language: French

Le Bal is a 1931 French comedy drama film directed by Wilhelm Thiele, and written jointly by Curt Siodmak, Ladislas Fodor and Henri Falk (dialogue). A German-language version, Der Ball, was simultaneously filmed with a different cast.

== Cast ==
- Germaine Dermoz as Madame Kampf
- Danielle Darrieux as Antoinette
- André Lefaur as M. Kampf
- Pierre de Guingand as Marcel de Brécourt
- Marguerite Pierry as La cousine Henriette
- Allan Durant
- Vanda Gréville as Miss Betty
- Paulette Dubost as La cliente
