= The Crowd (1951 film) =

- Directed by: Silvio Laurenti Rosa
- Written by: Marcello Ciorciolini; Mario Ferretti; Silvio Laurenti Rosa
- Produced by: Silvio Laurenti Rosa
- Starring: Marie Glory; Tino Buazzelli; Gilberto Mazzi
- Cinematography: Furio Maggi; Giuseppe Piccinelli; Giulio Rufini
- Release date: 1951
- Running time: 93 minutes
- Country: Italy
- Language: Italian

The Crowd (Italian: La Folla) is a 1951 Italian film.

== Plot ==
While a director is shooting a film, his aide (aka the assistant director) throws a bomb badly, sending the director, aide, and operator to the other world. Then the director thinks of making a film, which tells the story, highlighting how the crowd makes history. While the crowd raises its idols and then tears them down, the world is full of turncoats, who are serving their interests, deceiving the people. On the screen there are: Pontius Pilate and Jesus, vilified by the crowd. Richelieu, the French Revolution, the First Empire, Garibaldi, Cavour, Napoleon III, the Pope, the Duce, the Germans, the partisans and the armeggione, who juggles between one and the other, always staying afloat.

== Cast ==
- Marie Glory (as Mary Gloria)
- Tino Buazzelli
- Gilberto Mazzi
- Olinto Cristina
