= The Maelstrom of Paris =

1928 film

- Directed by: Julien Duvivier
- Written by: Germaine Acremant (novel); Julien Duvivier
- Produced by: Charles Delac; Marcel Vandal
- Starring: Lil Dagover; Léon Bary; Gaston Jacquet
- Cinematography: André Dantan; René Guichard; Armand Thirard
- Edited by: Marthe Poncin
- Production company: Le Film d'Art
- Release date: 30 March 1928
- Country: France
- Languages: Silent; French intertitles

The Maelstrom of Paris or The Whirlwind of Paris (French:Le tourbillon de Paris) is a 1928 French silent film directed by Julien Duvivier and starring Lil Dagover, Léon Bary and Gaston Jacquet.

== Cast ==
- Lil Dagover as Lady Amiscia Abenston
- Léon Bary as Jean Chaluste
- Gaston Jacquet as Lord Abenston
- Gina Barbieri]as La mère
- Hubert Daix as L'aubergiste
- René Lefèvre as Faverger
- Léonce Cargue as Le directeur
- Raymond Narlay as L'auteur
- Antoine Stacquet as Le régisseur
- Jane Dolys as L'habilleuse
- Jean Diéner
- Louis Gauthier
- Genevieve Irwin
- Philip Kieffer
- Louis Merlac
- Jane Pierson
- Marcelle Yrven

== Bibliography ==
- Goble, Alan. The Complete Index to Literary Sources in Film. Walter de Gruyter, 1999.
