= Paris (1924 film) =

1924 film

- Directed by: René Hervil
- Written by: Pierre Hamp; René Jeanne
- Produced by: Charles Delac; Marcel Vandal
- Starring: Pierre Magnier; Dolly Davis; Henry Krauss
- Cinematography: Louis Dubois; Henri Grignon; René Moreau
- Production company: Le Film d'Art
- Distributed by: Etablissements Louis Aubert
- Release date: 13 December 1924
- Country: France
- Languages: Silent; French intertitles

Paris is a 1924 French silent drama film directed by René Hervil and starring Pierre Magnier, Dolly Davis and Henry Krauss. The film's sets were designed by the art director Fernand Delattre.

== Cast ==
- Pierre Magnier as Maurice Revoil
- Dolly Davis as Aimée Valois
- Henry Krauss as François Roullet
- Jacqueline Forzane as Suzy Desroses
- Marie Bell as Marthe de Lignières
- Gaston Jacquet as Alpérof
- Jean-Louis Allibert as Jean Fleury
- Jean Devalde as Paul de Lignières
- Jeanne Méa as Madame de Lignières
- Louise Dauville
- Suzy Pierson
- Marie Glory

== Bibliography ==
- Powrie, Phil & Rebillard, Éric. Pierre Batcheff and stardom in 1920s French cinema. Edinburgh University Press, 2009.
- Rège, Philippe. Encyclopedia of French Film Directors, Volume 1. Scarecrow Press, 2009.
