= Prometheus Bound (disambiguation) =

Prometheus Bound is an Ancient Greek tragedy.

Prometheus Bound may also refer to:

- Prometheus Bound (Rubens), a c. 1611/12 painting by Peter Paul Rubens
- Prometheus Bound (Thomas Cole), an 1847 painting by Thomas Cole
- Prometheus Bound and the Oceanids, a 1879 sculpture by Eduard Müller

== See also ==
- Prometheus Unbound (Shelley), an 1820 play by Percy Bysshe Shelley
