= Madame Makes Her Exit =

1932 film

- Directed by: Wilhelm Thiele
- Written by: Franz Schulz; Wilhelm Thiele
- Based on: The Amorous Adventure by Paul Armont and Marcel Gerbidon
- Produced by: Charles Delac; Marcel Vandal
- Starring: Liane Haid; Hans Brausewetter; Hilde Hildebrand; Ilse Korseck
- Cinematography: Nicolas Farkas
- Edited by: René Le Hénaff
- Music by: Ralph Erwin
- Production company: Tobis Film
- Distributed by: Tobis Film
- Release date: 12 January 1932
- Running time: 85 minutes
- Country: Germany
- Language: German

Madame Makes Her Exit (German: Madame hat Ausgang) is a 1932 German romantic comedy film directed by Wilhelm Thiele and starring Liane Haid, Hans Brausewetter, Hilde Hildebrand. It was shot at the Epinay Studios of Tobis Film in Paris. It premiered on 12 January 1932. A separate French-language version Amourous Adventure was also released, directed by Thiele with a largely different cast.

== Synopsis ==
In Paris Madame Vernier discovers that her husband has been having an affair with the dancer Lilette. On the advice of her friend Eva, she decides to have a flirtation of her own and encounters Marcel Douzet, a handsome but poor bookbinder. To conceal her identity from him, she uses a false name and pretends to be a maid. This leads to an encounter where she has to pretend to be her own servant. Ultimately, she chooses to return to her husband.

== Cast ==
- Liane Haid as Madame Vernier
- Hans Brausewetter as Marcel Douzet
- Hilde Hildebrand as Eva, the friend
- Ilse Korseck as Georgette, the maid
- Elisabeth Pinajeff as Lilette, the girlfriend of Vernier
- Paul Biensfeldt as Marcel's helper
- Ernst Dumcke as Herr Venier
- Karl Etlinger as Marcel's father
- Hugo Fischer-Köppe as Gaston
- Ernst Pröckl as Albert
- Toni Tetzlaff as Marcel's mother

== Bibliography ==
- Grange, William (2008). Cultural Chronicle of the Weimar Republic. Scarecrow Press. ISBN 978-0-8108-5967-8.
