= Dr. Renault's Secret =

1942 film by Harry Lachman

- Directed by: Harry Lachman
- Screenplay by: William Bruckner; Robert F. Metzler
- Based on: Balaoo by Gaston Leroux
- Produced by: Sol M. Wurtzel
- Starring: J. Carrol Naish; Shepperd Strudwick; Lynne Roberts; George Zucco
- Cinematography: Virgil E. Miller
- Edited by: Fred Allen
- Music by: Emil Newman; David Raksin
- Color process: Black and white
- Production company: 20th Century Fox
- Distributed by: 20th Century Fox
- Release date: October 19, 1942 (U.S.)
- Running time: 58 minutes
- Country: United States
- Language: English

Dr. Renault's Secret is a 1942 American horror mystery film. The story was written by William Bruckner and Robert Metzler. It is loosely based on the 1911 novel Balaoo by Gaston Leroux. The production was directed by Harry Lachman and is a B movie with both mad scientist and monster themes.

== Plot ==
A young doctor named Larry Forbes (Shepperd Strudwick) arrives in a French village in order to wed the niece of prominent local doctor, Dr. Renault (George Zucco). Dr. Forbes learns from the innkeeper that a storm has washed out the bridge to Renault's house and he ends up spending the night at the inn. There he meets most of the film's main characters including Dr. Renault's strangely deformed man servant, Noel (J. Carrol Naish). It is during the night that the first of the murders occurs. Another tourist takes the room meant for him and is killed mysteriously.

The next day, Forbes travels to the house of Dr. Renault, where he is reunited with Renault's pretty young niece, Madeline (Lynne Roberts). A sequence of strange events, including an incident in which Noel is viciously attacked by a stray dog that Madeline picked up, convinces Forbes that there is something unusual about Noel, but he does not know what it is. Also, it quickly becomes clear that Noel is interested in Madeline as well.

After Madeline's stray dog is killed, Renault confronts Noel and it is revealed that his man servant is actually an experiment - an animal given the physical and mental characteristics of a man. Fearing for Forbes' life (as well as his own), Renault locks Noel in a cage, but the former animal is able to use his strength to escape and follows Forbes and Madeline to a carnival. There he is heckled by a pair of villagers, who are promptly murdered in their homes.

Forbes' suspicions increase and he sneaks into Dr. Renault's laboratory. There he finds a book detailing the experiments Dr. Renault carried out to transform Noel from an ape into a man. Renault catches Forbes reading his notes and threatens to kill him if he reveals the truth to anyone, but Noel sneaks up on the both of them and attacks and kills Dr. Renault. In the closing sequence, Madeline is abducted by her gardener, an ex-convict named Rogell (Mike Mazurki), and Noel pursues them. After a lengthy chase, Rogell shoots Noel. Before succumbing to his wounds, Noel strangles Rogell.

== Cast ==
- J. Carrol Naish as Noel
- Shepperd Strudwick as Dr. Larry Forbes (as John Strudwick)
- Lynne Roberts as Madeline Renault
- George Zucco as Dr. Robert Renault
- Mike Mazurki as Rogell

== Relation to other films ==
This B-film has been compared to H. G. Wells' The Island of Doctor Moreau though the similarities seem minor. The film has also been part of a double-bill with another 1942 horror film The Undying Monster. The screenplay was inspired by the lost 1927 film, The Wizard, based on a novel by Gaston Leroux.
