= Cesare Aureli =

Italian sculptor

Cesare Aureli (1844 in Rome – 1923) was an Italian sculptor and writer.

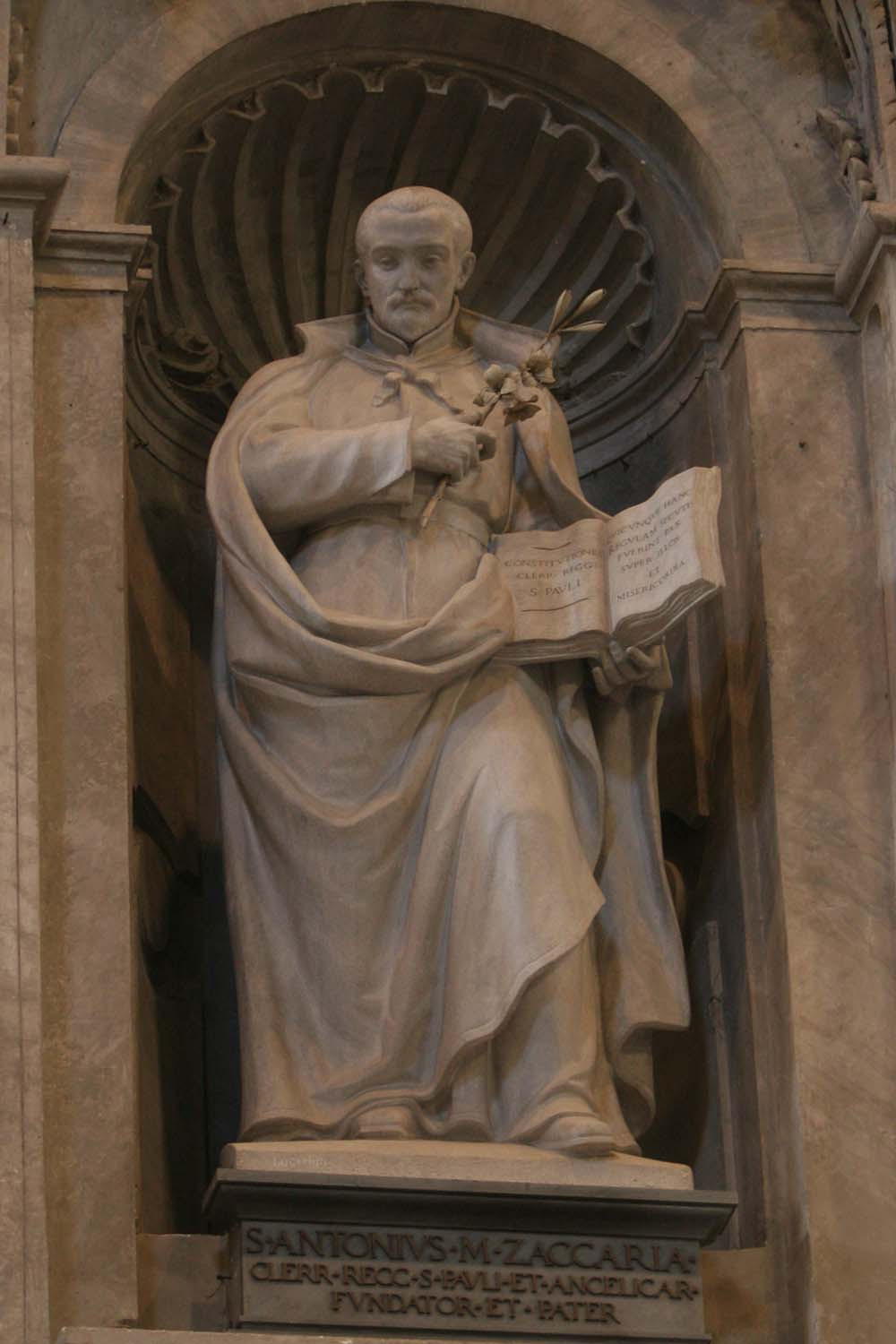
St Anthony Mary Zaccaria, St Peter's Basilica.

Aureli was born in Rome, Italy. He began his studies at the Accademia di San Luca in that same city. Aureli began his career as a sculptor working on the Torlonia Museum, and in the studio of the sculptor Eduard Müller. His independent works recall the sculptures of Luca della Robbia, and can be admired on the facade of the Palazzo delle Esposizioni in Rome.

Aureli's statue of the St Thomas Aquinas was presented to Pope Leo XIII during his episcopal jubilee celebrations. There are two versions of this statue: the original in the Vatican Library (1889) and one under the entrance portico of the Pontifical University of St Thomas Aquinas, Angelicum on the Quirinal Hill.

Aureli also made a marble group Galileo showing his astronomic model to Milton (1912), deeded to the University of Rome. He also planned statues of Torquato Tasso convalescing in Sant'Onofrio and The Graziella cuts her Hair, which he intended to send to the poet Alphonse de Lamartine, author of Graziella. Aureli wrote novels, dramatist, and served as an art critic. He was made a cavaliere dell'ordine di San Gregorio.

Among other works are a statue of cardinal Guglielmo Massaia (1893, Church of San Francesco al Tuscolo in Frascati; a statue of St Thomas Aquinas; Saints Anthony Mary Zaccaria, Bonfiglio, and Jean-Baptiste de La Salle (1903, Basilica of St Peter's, Rome); and the statue of Saint Cecilia (in Santa Cecilia in Trastevere).
