= Raymond Rognoni =

French actor and comedian

Raymond Rognoni (French pronunciation: [ʁɛmɔ̃ ʁɔɲɔni]; Paris, 16 August 1892 – Paris, 26 September 1965) was a French actor and comedian. He worked in the theatre and in film (Sylvie et le fantôme, Les Enfants du Paradis), sometimes credited as Rognoni.

== Biography ==
Rognoni was born Roch Raymond Rognoni on 16 August 1892 in Paris. He worked for the Comédie-Française from 1922 to 1929.

In 1924, he founded in Paris, with the status of an association, a secondary school intended to protect young actors who did not attend school, the École des enfants du spectacle.

In 1932, he opened one of the first film schools in France, the Cours d'introduction au cinéma (Introductory course to cinema). The director of a well-known radio station and a speaker were in charge of "teaching the microphone", an actress gave music lessons, a director gave scriptwriting lessons, and three other teachers gave dance and foreign language lessons.

In 1941, he founded the Centre de jeunesse du spectacle (Youth Centre for Entertainment), the ancestor of the École nationale supérieure des arts et techniques du théâtre (ENSATT, one of the twelve national theater schools in France), and directed it from 1941 to 1944.

During the German occupation of France, Raymond Rognoni was an "outspoken supporter of collaboration with Nazi Germany under the occupation". In his book Le Juif Süss et la propagande nazie: L'Histoire confisquée (2003), the historian Claude Singer notes several unambiguous behaviors: he is the French voice of one of the characters in the Nazi propaganda film Jud Süß released in 1940; he acts in an openly anti-Semitic French film, Les corrupteurs, by Pierre Ramelot (1942); « he participates, on several occasions, in propaganda broadcasts on Radio-Paris »; finally, in March 1944, he lends his voice to the Nazi propaganda documentary Katyn. In the immediate post-war period, he leaves for three years in South America before resuming his Parisian life in 1948 and giving lessons at the Théâtre des Mathurins.

He died 26 September 1965 in Paris.

== Selected filmography ==
- American Love (1931)
- The Fortune (1931)
- La chauve-souris (1931)
- L'Aventurier (1934)
- Your Smile (1934)
- The Darling of His Concierge (1934)
- His Other Love (1934)
- The House on the Dune (1934)
- Madame Angot's Daughter (1935)
- Claudine at School (1937)
- Personal Column (1939)
- Grandfather (1939)
- The Corsican Brothers (1939)
- Monsieur Hector (1940)
- Jud Süß (1940, voice only)
- The Island of Love (1944)
- Mademoiselle X (1945)
- Majestic Hotel Cellars (1945)
- Les Enfants du Paradis (1945)
- Father Goriot (1945)
- Sylvie and the Ghost (1946)
- My Seal and Them (1951)
- My Friend Oscar (1951)
- Le Plaisir (1952)
- Love in the Vineyard (1952)
- Alone in the World (1952)
- The Agony of the Eagles (1952)
- Their Last Night (1953)
