= The Shadow Puppet =

1932 novel by Georges Simenon

- Author: Georges Simenon
- Original title: French: L'Ombre chinoise
- Language: French
- Series: Inspector Jules Maigret
- Genre: Detective fiction, Crime fiction
- Publisher: Fayard
- Publication date: 1932
- Publication place: France
- English publication date: 1934
- Media type: Print
- Preceded by: The Two-Penny Bar
- Followed by: The Saint-Fiacre Affair

The Shadow Puppet (also known as Maigret Mystified and The Shadow in the Courtyard); French: L'Ombre chinoise) is a 1932 detective novel by Belgian writer Georges Simenon featuring his character Detective Chief Inspector Maigret. A businessman has been shot dead in his office and a large sum of money taken from his safe.

Originally published in French, the novel has been translated into English three times and adapted for film and television five times. Critics have praised the novel for its vivid portrayal of both its characters and settings in Place des Vosges, Boulevard Haussmann, and Pigalle.

== Plot ==
Detective Chief Inspector Maigret investigates the murder of businessman Raymond Couchet in his office at Place des Vosges, Paris. 360,000 francs are missing from the safe. At the crime scene, Maigret learns that Couchet was shot sometime between 8 p.m and 9 p.m, and that Couchet was supposed to meet his mistress, Nine Moinard, at the Café Select at 8 p.m. Maigret sees Monsieur Martin, a resident of the nearby apartments, searching the rubbish bins in the courtyard. He says he is looking for his lost glove.

The next day Maigret questions Nine in her room at the Hotel Pigalle. He learns that Couchet's son, Roger, occupies the adjoining room. He finds Roger and Monsieur Martin there. Roger is unemployed, a drug user, and regularly solicits money from his father. He is also the stepson of Monsieur Martin, whose wife was Couchet's first wife. Roger tells Maigret that he was at the Café Select at the time of the murder as he knew his father met Nine there and he wanted to ask him for money. Martin tells Maigret that he went for a walk by the Seine last night and later found his missing glove at home.

Madame Martin calls on Maigret. She explains that she married Couchet when she was young. Roger was their only child. Couchet squandered his money and could not keep a steady job. She asked for a divorce and married Monsieur Martin because he had a secure job at the registry office. When they moved into Place des Vosges, they did not know Couchet ran a laboratory there and was now rich.

Maigret goes to the Martins' apartment and notices that they can see into Couchet's office from their window. He visits Madame Couchet in her apartment on Boulevard Haussmann. She tells him Roger came earlier and enquired about the will. He is entitled to half the estate, and she will not challenge it.

Next morning, Maigret finds that Madame Martin is bedridden with nervous exhaustion. He interviews one of her neighbours, who says that just after 8 p.m. on the night of the murder he saw her rummaging through the bins in the courtyard.

Maigret learns that Couchet recently wrote a draft will leaving his fortune equally between Madame Couchet, Madame Martin and Nine. Madame Couchet's uncle, colonel Dormoy, tells Maigret the family will contest the will.

Maigret tells Roger about the will, but Roger says he does not care about the inheritance and will not contest the will even though he has no money. Maigret takes Roger's gun, believing he might be contemplating suicide.

Nine tells Maigret that Couchet had heart trouble and knew he was dying. While walking her home, Maigret sees a crowd outside the Hotel Pigalle. Roger has killed himself by jumping out of his window.

Maigret visits the Martins and finds that Madame Martin is much worse. He tells Monsieur Martin about the will and Roger's suicide. Maigret thinks Martin is on the point of confessing something.

An elderly neighbour of the Martins tells Maigret she often hears Madame Martin scolding her husband for being a failure. On the day before Madame Martin became sick, she heard her berate her husband because he did not bring home the money. On a bus Maigret hears a passenger say that dozens of 1,000 franc notes have been found in the Seine.

The next day, Monsieur Martin is arrested on a train headed for Belgium. Maigret questions the Martins in their apartment. He discovers that Madame Martin had watched Couchet from her window and had urged her husband to steal the money from the open safe while Couchet was in the toilet. Martin did so but left his glove in Couchet's office before leaving the courtyard with the money. Frustrated by her husband's blunder, she went downstairs with a pistol to retrieve the glove. When Couchet returned, she shot him then hid the pistol in a rubbish bin in the courtyard. Monsieur Martin was so frightened about being found with the stolen money he threw it in the Seine. When Madame Martin found out about this, she berated him and had a nervous breakdown. She is taken to a mental asylum.

== Background ==
Simenon lived in the Place des Vosges from 1924 to 1931 and drew on his experience there to portray the location and its residents in the novel. A Hoffman-La Roche laboratory was located in the courtyard, just as Raymond Couchet's serum laboratory is in the novel.

== Publication history ==
The novel was first published in French in 1932 by Fayard in Paris. It has been translated three times into English: anonymously in 1934 as The Shadow in the Courtyard, in 1964 as Maigret Mystified by Jean Stewart, and in 2015 by Ros Schwartz as The Shadow Puppet.

== Adaptations ==
The novel has been adapted five times for film and television: in Italian in 2004 as L'ombra cinese, with Sergio Castellitto in the main role and in 1966 as L'ombra cinese, with Gino Cervi in the lead role; in French in 2004 as L'ombre chinoise, with Bruno Cremer in the main role and in 1969 as L'Ombre chinoise with Jean Richard in the lead role; and in English in 1961 as Shadow Play, with Rupert Davies in the main role.

== Reception ==
In a 1964 review, Anthony Boucher of The New York Times found the settings "vividly realized" and the killer "well-characterized". Critic Barry Forshaw, writing in 2022, also praised Simenon's blending of the different settings of petty officials, high-bourgeoisie and Pigalle, and his acute description of the relationships among the residents of the apartment in Place des Vosges.

== Bibliography ==
- Forshaw, Barry (2022). Simenon: the Man, the Books, the Films, a 21st Century Guide. Harpenden, UK: Oldcastle Books. ISBN 9780857305145.
- Marnham, Patrick (1994). The Man Who Wasn't Maigret, A Portrait of Georges Simenon. Harcourt Brace & Company. ISBN 0-15-600059-8.
- Piron, Maurice; Lemoine, Michel (1983). L'Univers de Simenon, guide des romans et nouvelles (1931-1972) de Georges Simenon. Paris: Presses de la Cité. pp. 282–283. ISBN 978-2-258-01152-6.
- Simenon, Georges (2015). The Shadow Puppet. Translated by Schwartz, Ross. London: Penguin. ISBN 9780141394183.
- Young, Trudee (1976). Georges Simenon, a checklist of his 'Maigret' and other mystery novels and short stories in French and in English translations. Metuchen, N.J.: The Scarecrow Press. ISBN 0-8108-0964-8.
