= Down Our Street =

1932 British film by Harry Lachman

- Directed by: Harry Lachman
- Written by: Ernest George (play); Harry Lachman
- Produced by: S.E. Fitzgibbon
- Starring: Hugh Williams; Nancy Price; Elizabeth Allan
- Distributed by: Paramount Pictures
- Release date: 1932
- Running time: 87 minutes
- Country: United Kingdom
- Language: English

Down Our Street is a 1932 black and white British film directed by Harry Lachman.

== Plot ==
This drama, set during the Depression, sees the character Charlie Stubbs trying to escape his poverty by becoming a criminal. When this course of action fails he cleans up his act and becomes a cab driver for the woman he loves, Annie Collins. Trouble follows Charlie however when Annie's uncle discovers his past.

== Cast ==
- Hugh Williams as Charlie Stubbs
- Nancy Price as Annie Collins
- Elizabeth Allan as Maisie Collins
- Binnie Barnes as Tessie Bemstein
- Frederick Burtwell as Fred Anning
- Sydney Fairbrother as Maggie Anning
- Alexander Field as Sam
- Morris Harvey as Bill Collins
- Merle Tottenham as Rose
