= The Marriage of Mademoiselle Beulemans (1927 film) =

1927 film

- Directed by: Julien Duvivier
- Written by: Jean François Fonson (play); Fernand Wicheler (play); Julien Duvivier
- Produced by: Charles Delac; Marcel Vandal
- Starring: Andrée Brabant; Jean Dehelly; Gustave Libeau
- Cinematography: René Guichard; Armand Thirard
- Edited by: Marthe Poncin
- Production company: Les Films Marcel Vandal et Charles Delac
- Release date: 23 September 1927
- Running time: 65 minutes
- Country: France
- Languages: Silent; French intertitles

The Marriage of Mademoiselle Beulemans (French: Le Mariage de Mademoiselle Beulemans) is a 1927 French silent comedy film directed by Julien Duvivier and starring Andrée Brabant, Jean Dehelly and Gustave Libeau. It is based on the 1910 Belgian play Le Mariage de mademoiselle Beulemans.

== Cast ==
- Andrée Brabant as Suzanne Beulemans
- Jean Dehelly as Albert Delpierre
- Gustave Libeau as M. Beulemans
- Dinah Valence as Mme Beulemans
- René Lefèvre as Seraphím Meulemeester
- Suzanne Christy as Anna
- Mary Anne as Isabelle
- Marcel Barencey as Meulemeester père
- René Derigal as Delpierre père
- Hubert Daix as Mortinax
- Jane Pierson
- Jean Diéner
- Esther Delterre
- Léon Malavier
- Maude de la Vault

== Legacy ==
The film was screened at the Cinémathèque française in 2010 and 2013 as part of regular screenings of historically-important films and of a Duvivier retrospective, respectively.

== Bibliography ==
- Goble, Alan. The Complete Index to Literary Sources in Film. Walter de Gruyter, 1999.
