= Ferdinando Ruggieri (painter) =

Italian painter

Ferdinando Ruggieri (1831 –) was a 19th-century Italian painter from Naples.

== Biography ==
Ruggieri first began studying natural sciences, but at the age of 22 years, he dedicated himself solely to painting. After a year of lessons under Domenico Caldara, he exhibited at the contest of the Institute of Fine Arts in 1853, obtaining a first prize. At the second contest, he also won the first prize for statuary. At the scuola del nudo, he also won some first prizes and gained exemption from military service. His portrait of his father won a gold medal. Awarded a first class medal, his Christopher Columbus at the Court of Spain, was once found in the Royal Palace of Naples. Among other notable works are: Silvio Pellico in the Piombi (Prison) of Venice, The last hours of Giovanni Battista Pergolese, and Vico sells his mother's ring to be able to publish his Scienza Nuova. The latter won a first prize at a Brera Academy exhibition. Ruggeri completed two large canvases for the Royal Chapel in Naples: Jesus and the Doctors at the Temple and The last Supper which were both painted life-size.

He next painted Tommaso Campanella at the Court of Louis XIII; then the Youth of Vittorio Alfieri che si addormenta ai dolci versi di Racine, quadretto di piccola dimensione che fu scelto ad unanimità dal giurì artistico. He painted two small canvases: The infancy of Rossini and The Dream of Tortini. He also painted scenes of domestic genre, and among the subjects depicted are: A poor orphan girl, Autumn, Dispetto, Scherzo amoroso, Sospetto, Povera mamma mia non toma più!, Anche oggi verrà, Una gioia, Un forte dolore, All'ombra de' faggi, Un conto senza l'oste, Sogno e realtà, Una guardia incomotibile, Facviam la pace, Pronti per una passeggiata, cavalleria, Pane e lavoro, Il mezzo giorno alla campagna, Impressione d'un dramma, Graziella di Lamartine (inspired by Alphonse de Lamartine's novel Graziella), and Una leggitrice. He was a prolific artist, working in France, Italy, and in America. He spent some time in Paris where he stayed for two years. For his painting of Tortini, he obtained an honorable mention. For his portrait of a young Rossini, he was honored by the Society of Friends of Fine Arts of Amiens. For this and other paintings, King Vittorio Emanuele conferred him the Cross of the knight of the Order of the Crown of Italy.
