= Your Smile (film) =

1934 film

- Directed by: Monty Banks; Pierre Caron
- Written by: Alberto Cavalcanti
- Based on: Your Smile by André Birabeau and Georges Dolley
- Produced by: Jean Dehelly; Jean Husco
- Starring: Victor Boucher; Marie Glory; Raymond Rognoni
- Cinematography: Henri Barreyre
- Music by: Pierre Vellones
- Production company: Compagnie Française Cinématographique
- Release date: 7 December 1934
- Running time: 83 minutes
- Country: France
- Language: French

Your Smile (French: Votre sourire) is a 1934 French comedy film directed by Monty Banks and Pierre Caron and starring Victor Boucher, Marie Glory and Raymond Rognoni. It is an adaptation of a play of the same title by André Birabeau and Georges Dolley.

== Cast ==
- Victor Boucher as Colin
- Marie Glory as Colette
- Raymond Rognoni as Monsieur Bouday
- Daniel Lecourtois as Monsieur Martin
- Simone Deguyse as Mademoiselle Aubry
- Renée Devilder as La chanteuse
- Louis Baron fils
- Georges Benoît
- Colette Clauday
- Jean Dehelly
- Pierre Huchet
- Inka Krymer
- André Lannes
- Marthe Mussine
- Jean Rousselière
- Michèle Verly

== Bibliography ==
- Bessy, Maurice & Chirat, Raymond. Histoire du cinéma français: 1929-1934. Pygmalion, 1988.
- Crisp, Colin. Genre, Myth and Convention in the French Cinema, 1929-1939. Indiana University Press, 2002.
- Goble, Alan. The Complete Index to Literary Sources in Film. Walter de Gruyter, 1999.
