= The Dancer at the Gai-Moulin =

1931 detective novel by Georges Simenon

- First edition (publ. A. Fayard)
- Author: Georges Simenon
- Original title: (Fr.) La Danseuse du Gai-Moulin
- Language: French
- Series: Inspector Jules Maigret
- Genre: Detective fiction
- Published: 1931 A. Fayard
- Publication place: France
- Media type: Print
- Preceded by: A Man's Head
- Followed by: The Two-Penny Bar

The Dancer at the Gai-Moulin (French: La Danseuse du Gai-Moulin), is a 1931 detective novel by the Belgian writer Georges Simenon featuring his character Detective Chief Inspector Maigret of the Paris judicial police. The plot involves Maigret's unofficial investigation of the murder of a Greek man at the Gai-Moulin nightclub in Liège, Belgium. The novel has been translated into English twice and adapted for film and television twice.

== Plot ==
Teenagers Jean Chabot and René Delfosse plan to hide in the cellar and rob the till at the Liège nightclub, the Gai-Moulin. After the club closes for the night, they find the body of a Greek man who they had earlier seen spending freely at the club and talking with Adèle, one of its dancers. They flee the club in panic without robbing the till. The next day, they learn that the Greek's body has been found in the botanical gardens; he had been killed by a blow to the head.

René, whose father is rich, tells Jean he has stolen money from his uncle's chocolate shop. They notice a man following them who René identifies as a detective. René convinces Jean that they should go to the Gai-Moulin as usual, where Jean should flush the stolen money down the toilet.

Jean is arrested while trying to dispose of the money, and the police follow René to Adèle's apartment. The next morning, René evades them, but they find the Greek's gold cigarette case in the apartment and arrest Adèle. The police question Jean, Adèle, Génaro – the owner of the Gai-Moulin – and Victor, a waiter at the club. Adèle, Génaro and Victor say that René had the Greek's cigarette case last night. On the night of the murder, the Greek had been one of the last to leave. Adèle then left at the same time as a Frenchman who asked her for directions. Génaro and Victor then closed the club. The police allow Génaro, Victor and Adèle to go free.

That night, the Frenchman appears at the club and the police take him in for questioning. He reveals himself to be Chief Inspector Maigret of the Paris judicial police. He tells the local police that the Greek had asked for police protection in Paris and he had followed the Greek to his hotel in Liège. He says he does not think the two teenagers committed the murder. He asks to be arrested and imprisoned in the hope that the real killers relax and make an incriminating move.

The police arrest René but release him and Jean after questioning. Maigret tells the police he found the Greek dead in his hotel room hours after they both had left the club. He believes that the Greek returned to the club and hid there to search for something. When he heard the teenagers come up from the cellar he played dead. He later returned to his hotel where he was killed. Maigret suspected a criminal gang was involved, so he moved the body to the botanic gardens in the hope that the killers would panic and reveal themselves.

At Maigret's suggestion, the police announce that the French suspect has killed himself, an act that was a virtual confession of guilt. The police then keep a watch on René, Jean and the Gai-Moulin. They see Victor leave the club. René then arrives at the club and leaves soon after. The police follow both to Adèle's apartment where they find them wrestling on the floor. Maigret searches the apartment and finds secret military documents and the Greek's wallet containing a large amount of cash. Maigret explains that Génaro, Victor and Adèle are part of a spy ring. The Greek was a novice spy who went to the Gai-Moulin to look for secret documents. After René had seen the apparently dead Greek and had fled the club, he remembered he had heard the Greek giving Adèle his hotel address. He went to the Greek's hotel room to search for valuables. When the Greek returned to his room, René struck him with his cane, killing him. René stole the Greek's wallet and went to Adèle's apartment where he hid it.

Maigret later learns that Victor and Génaro were jailed for their crimes. Adèle was acquitted. Jean's father sent him to the Belgian Congo to make a man of him. René has died in a mental asylum.

== Background ==
The novel was written in 25 hours, and is one of nine Maigret novels Simenon wrote in 1931. It is one of two Maigret novels that is explicitly set in Liège, the city where Simenon was born and lived until the age of 18.

== Publication history ==
The novel was first published in French in 1931 as La Danseuse du Gai-Moulin by Fayard in Paris. The first English edition, translated by Geoffrey Sainsbury, was published in 1940 as At the Gai-Moulin in a two-book volume (including A Crime in Holland) entitled Maigret Abroad. It was published simultaneously by George Routledge and Sons in the UK and by Harcourt, Brace & Co. in the United States. It was published in a new translation by Siân Reynolds by Penguin UK in 2015.

== Adaptations ==
A German language film version Maigret and His Greatest Case premiered on 24 November 1966 starring Heinz Rühmann as Maigret. A French TV adaptation aired on 29 August 1981 with Jean Richard playing Maigret.

== Works cited ==
- Becker, Lucille (2006). Georges Simenon: Maigrets and the romans durs. London: Haus Publishing. ISBN 9781904950349.
- Bresler, Fenton (1983). The Mystery of Georges Simenon: A Biography. London: Heinemann/Quixote Press. ISBN 0434980331.
- Simenon, Georges (2015). The Dancer at the Gai-Moulin. Translated by Reynolds, Siân. London: Penguin. ISBN 9780141393520.
- Young, Trudee (1976). Georges Simenon, a checklist of his 'Maigret' and other mystery novels and short stories in French and in English translations. Metuchen, N.J.: The Scarecrow Press. ISBN 0-8108-0964-8.
