= Pierre Frondaie =

French playwright, novelist, and poet (1884–1948)

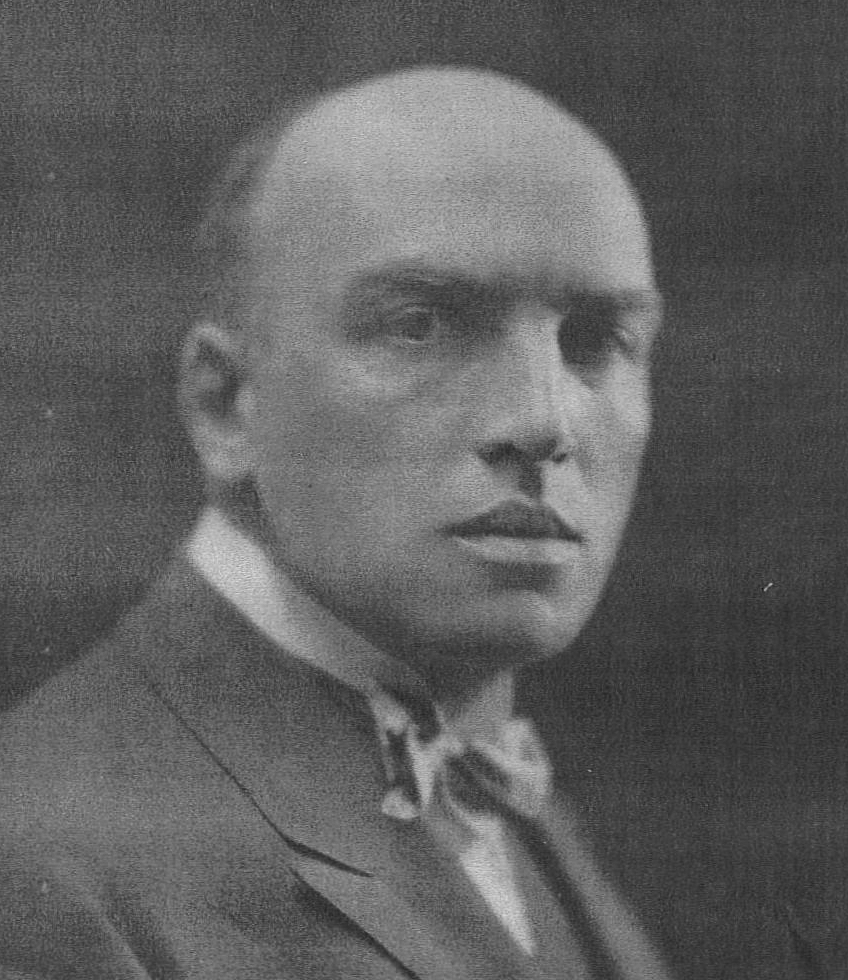
- Frondaie, in the 1920s
- Born: Albert René Fraudet; 25 April 1884; Paris, France
- Died: 25 September 1948 (aged 64); Vaucresson, France
- Writing career
- Language: French
- Genres: Theater; Poetry; Novel

Pierre Frondaie (born Albert René Fraudet; 25 April 1884 – 25 September 1948) was a French poet, novelist, and playwright.

== Biography ==
Pierre Frondaie – né Albert René Fraudet – was born in 1884 in Paris to an upper-middle-class family. He began writing as a teenager and soon devoted himself to the theme that would come to define his career as a man of letters, namely love and its vicissitudes. His success came early. The French stage legend Sarah Bernhardt fostered his talents as an actor and playwright, producing and acting in one of his plays during a triumphant American tour. In 1925, Frondaie published L'Homme à l'Hispano (The Man in the Hispano-Suiza), the novel that would go on to become his bestseller, translated in 15 languages. The book inspired a successful play, staged in Paris in 1928, and two film adaptations (the first by Julien Duvivier in 1926, the second by Jean Epstein in 1933). Frondaie soon caught the attention of Hollywood, then in its infancy, where several cinematographic adaptations were made of his works for an English-speaking audience by Paramount Pictures and Samuel Goldwyn. In 1928, Howard Hawks directed Fazil, based on Frondaie’s play L'Insoumise.

In France, Frondaie’s talents earned him a large audience, as well as the respect of his contemporaries, including notable authors such as Pierre Louÿs and academicians (members of the Académie française) such as Anatole France, Maurice Barrès, and Claude Farrère. As a playwright, he became a darling of the Parisian stage, with stars such as Polaire, Régina Badet, and Sylvie acting in his plays. Productions of his theatrical works toured Europe and made their way to Broadway. From Broadway to Hollywood, few French authors can claim the kind of success Frondaie enjoyed in America at the time. Frondaie was then referred to as a veritable literary phenomenon.

From 1942 until his death, Pierre Frondaie ran the Théâtre de l'Ambigu, in Paris, and focused on directing and producing several of his own plays. At times he was even on stage playing opposite his wife, Maria Favella, an actress.

Frondaie’s flamboyant lifestyle mirrored that of some of the high-society characters he wrote about in his plays and novels. He traveled frequently across the world, jetting between homes in Paris and Arcachon, making regular visits to the Basque coast, and rubbing elbows with the jazz-age beau monde.

He was married four times, to illustrious and independent women, but never had children. Frondaie's first wife, Jeanne Gellier, was an actress known under the stage name of Michelle. After the couple’s divorce, Frondaie married Madeleine Charnaux, a sculptor, student of Antoine Bourdelle, and later an aviator. This marriage, too, was short lived. Frondaie was then betrothed to lawyer and author Jeanne Loviton (who wrote under the name Jean Voilier). After they separated, Frondaie married Maria Favella, a promising young actress student of the famous Cours Simon and fresh out of the Conservatory. He would spend the rest of his life with her.

Frondaie’s works tend to revolve around love – or perhaps the yearning for love – and its effects on human relationships and social behavior. Scholars of his work have attributed this theme to two events that profoundly affected the author at a young age: the death of his mother when he was 17, followed a few months later by that of his first love. As a result of these traumas, he was forever haunted by the fear of losing those he loved.

In 1948, Frondaie died of a heart attack in Vaucresson, a residential suburb of Paris, in the home he shared with Maria Favella. He was 64. Favella then took over the reins of the Théàtre de l’Ambigu, and proved to be a savvy businesswoman. After Frondaie’s death, she bequeathed his archives to his beloved city of Arcachon.

== Selected bibliography ==
=== Novels ===
- 1907 : Les Fatidiques, Edition du « Monde Illustré ».
- 1909 : Tu seras roi, Librairie des Annales.
- 1911 : Contes Réels et Fantaisistes, Edition du « Monde Illustré ».
- 1925 : L'Homme à l'Hispano, Editions le Festin.
- 1926 : L'Eau du Nil, Editions Emile-Paul Frères.
- 1928 : Deux fois vingt ans, Plon.
- 1929 : La Côte des Dieux, Editions Emile-Paul Frères.
- 1929 : Auprès de ma blonde..., Editions Emile-Paul Frères.
- 1930 : Béatrice devant le désir, Editions Emile-Paul Frères.
- 1931 : Le Voleur de femmes, Editions Emile-Paul Frères.
- 1931 : Iris perdue et retrouvée, Editions Emile-Paul Frères.
- 1932 : Zigoël, Editions Emile-Paul Frères.
- 1933 : De l'Amour à l'Amour, Editions Emile-Paul Frères.
- 1933 : La femme de Iakof, Editions Emile-Paul Frères.
- 1934 : Isabelle et les préjugés, Editions Baudinière.
- 1934 : Cette femme qui fut divine..., Editions Baudinière.
- 1935 : Quand le diable s'en mêle..., Editions Baudinière.
- 1935 : Le Lieutenant de Gibraltar, Editions Baudinière.
- 1935 : Le Lieutenant de Gibraltar, Librairie Plon.
- 1936 : Port-Arthur, Librairie Plon.
- 1938 : Le Volontaire, Librairie Plon.
- 1941 : Ce que Bodley m'a ranconté, Librairie Plon.
- 1942 : Montmartre, Editions Baudinière.

=== Theater ===
Performances

- La Femme et le Pantin, a play in 4 acts by Pierre Louÿs and Pierre Frondaie, Paris, Théâtre Antoine, December 8, 1910
- Blanche Câline, a play in 3 acts, Théâtre Michel, 4
- La Maison cernée, a play in 4 acts, Théâtre Sarah-Bernhardt, 12 with Madame Michelle (Jeanne Gillier) and Louis Gauthier
- L'Appassionata, a play in 4 acts, Théâtre de la Porte Saint-Martin, 10
- Le Reflet, a play in 4 acts, Théâtre Fémina, June
- L'Insoumise, a play in 4 acts, Théâtre Antoine, 10
- Le Fils de Don Quichotte, a play in 4 acts, directed by Charles Dullin, music by Henri Sauguet, with Charles Dullin, Étienne Decroux, Madeleine Tambour, Paris, Théâtre de l'Atelier, December 20, 1930
- La Gardienne, a play in 4 acts, Théâtre de la Porte Saint-Martin, 10
- La Marche au destin, a play in 3 acts, Théâtre de la Renaissance, March 21, 1924
- Les Amants de Paris, a play in 4 acts, Théâtre Sarah-Bernhardt, 10, with Sylvie, Mady Berry, Harry Baur, Pierre Blanchar and Fernand Fabre

Editions

- 1907 : Rose Flamberge, Librairie Paul Ollendorff.
- 1911 : Montmartre, Librairie Charpentier et Fasquelle. Eugène Fasquelle, éditeur.
- 1911 : La Femme et le Pantin (in collaboration with Pierre Louÿs), Librairie des Annales.
- 1913 : Blanche Câline, La Petite Illustration.
- 1913 : L'Homme qui assassina (based on a novel by Claude Farrère), Librairie Paul Ollendorff.
- 1914 : Aphrodite (based on a novel by Pierre Louÿs), Fontemoing & Cie.
- 1915 : Colette Baudoche (based on a novel by Maurice Barrès), Emile-Paul Frères, éditeur.
- 1916 : Le Crime de Sylvestre Bonnard (based on a novel by Anatole France), Les Annales.
- 1920 : La Maison cernée, Librairie Théâtrale.
- 1921 : L'Appassionata, Librairie Théâtrale Artistique et Littéraire.
- 1921 : La Bataille (based on a novel by Claude Farrère), Librairie Théâtrale.
- 1922 : Le Reflet, La Petite Illustration.
- 1923 : L'Insoumise, Librairie Théâtrale.
- 1924 : La Gardienne, L'Illustration.
- 1926 : La Menace, Librairie Théâtrale.
- 1928 : Les Amants de Paris L'Illustration.
- 1928 : L'Homme à l'Hispano.

=== Poetry ===
- 1907: Les Pierres de Lune. Les Bijoux de la morte. Quelques cailloux, Librarie Paul Ollendorff.
- 1916: Le prélude aux poèmes du Coq
- 1918: La Nuit sur le Rhin

== Filmography ==
- Det omringade huset, directed by Victor Sjöström (Sweden, 1922, based on the play La Maison cernée)
- The Man with the Hispano, directed by Julien Duvivier (France, 1926, based on the novel L'Homme à l'Hispano)
- Fazil, directed by Howard Hawks (USA, 1928, based on the play L'Insoumise)
- La Menace, directed by Jean Bertin (France, 1928, based on the play La Menace)
- L'Eau du Nil, directed by Marcel Vandal (France, 1928, based on the novel L'Eau du Nil)
- L'Appassionata, directed by Léon Mathot and André Liabel (France, 1929, based on the play L'Appassionata)
- Deux fois vingt ans, directed by Charles-Félix Tavano (France, 1931, based on the novel Deux fois vingt ans)
- La ley del harem, directed by Lewis Seiler (USA, Spanish-language film, 1931, based on the play L'Insoumise)
- The Man with the Hispano, directed by Jean Epstein (France, 1933, based on the novel L'Homme à l'Hispano)
- Iris perdue et retrouvée, directed by Louis J. Gasnier (France, 1934, based on the novel Iris perdue et retrouvée)
- La Route impériale, directed by Marcel L'Herbier (France, 1935, based on the play La Maison cernée)
- Port-Arthur, directed by Nicolas Farkas (French, 1936, based on the novel Port-Arthur)
  - Port Arthur, directed by Nicolas Farkas (German, 1936, based on the novel Port-Arthur)
- The Woman Thief, directed by Abel Gance (French, 1938, based on the novel Le Voleur de femmes)
  - Ladro di donne, directed by Abel Gance (Italian, 1938, based on the novel Le Voleur de femmes)
- Behold Beatrice, directed by Jean de Marguenat (France, 1944, based on the novel Béatrice devant le désir)
- Wolves Hunt at Night, directed by Bernard Borderie (France, 1952, based on the novel Le Lieutenant de Gibraltar)
