= Moon Over Morocco (film) =

1931 film

- Directed by: Julien Duvivier
- Written by: Julien Duvivier; André Reuze (novel)
- Produced by: Charles Delac; Marcel Vandal
- Starring: Harry Baur; René Lefèvre; Rosine Deréan
- Cinematography: René Moreau; Armand Thirard
- Edited by: Marthe Poncin
- Music by: Jacques Ibert
- Production company: Les Films Marcel Vandal et Charles Delac
- Distributed by: Les Films Marcel Vandal et Charles Delac
- Release date: 29 October 1931
- Running time: 87 minutes
- Country: France
- Language: French

Moon Over Morocco (French: Les cinq gentlemen maudits) is a 1931 French mystery film directed by Julien Duvivier and starring Harry Baur, René Lefèvre and Rosine Deréan. A separate German-language film The Five Accursed Gentlemen was also produced.

The film's sets were designed by the art director Lazare Meerson.

== Cast ==
- Harry Baur as M. de Marouvelle
- René Lefèvre as Jacques Le Guérantec
- Rosine Deréan as Françoise
- Robert Le Vigan as Donald Strawber
- Marc Dantzer as Sydney Woodland
- Georges Péclet as Le capitaine Lawson
- Jacques Erwin as Midlock
- Allan Durant as Le sorcier
- Odette Barencey as Fille du sorcier
- Mady Berry as Stéphanie, la gouvernante
- Manou as Danseuse avec le serpent

== Bibliography ==
- Rège, Philippe. Encyclopedia of French Film Directors, Volume 1. Scarecrow Press, 2009.
