= Maigret and His Greatest Case =

1966 film

- Directed by: Alfred Weidenmann
- Written by: Herbert Reinecker
- Based on: Maigret at the Gai-Moulin by Georges Simenon
- Produced by: Heinz Pollak; Karl Spiehs
- Starring: Heinz Rühmann; Françoise Prévost; Günther Stoll
- Cinematography: Heinz Hölscher
- Edited by: Gretl Girinec
- Music by: Erwin Halletz
- Production companies: Intercontinental Filmproduktion; Terra Film; Carmina Films; Constantin Film
- Distributed by: Constantin Film
- Release date: 24 November 1966
- Running time: 89 minutes
- Countries: Austria; France; Italy; West Germany
- Language: German

Maigret and His Greatest Case or Enter Inspector Maigret (German: Maigret und sein größter Fall) is a 1966 crime film directed by Alfred Weidenmann and starring Heinz Rühmann, Françoise Prévost and Günther Stoll. It was made as a co-production between Austria, France, Italy and West Germany. It is based on the 1931 novel Maigret at the Gai-Moulin featuring the fictional Sûreté detective Jules Maigret.

It was shot at the Sievering Studios in Vienna and on location in Lausanne. The film's sets were designed by the art director Hertha Hareiter.

== Cast ==
- Heinz Rühmann as Kommissar Maigret
- Françoise Prévost as Simone Lefèbvre
- Günther Stoll as Alain Robin
- Günter Strack as Kommissar Delvigne
- Gerd Vespermann as Inspektor Caselle
- Christo Neggas as Adriano Genaro
- Ulli Lommel as René Delfosse
- Edwin Noël as Jean Chabeau
- Giacomo Furia as Marcello Genaro
- Claudio Camaso as Giorgio Genaro
- Alexander Kerst as André Delfosse
- Francesca Rosano as Franchita
- Peter Groß as Inspektor Lapointe
- Silvana Sansoni as Animierdame
- Peter Gerhard as Museumsdirektor
- Rudolf Barry as Inspektor Lucas
- Walter Varndal as Bauchladenmann
- Günther Ungeheuer as Mr. Holoway
- Eddi Arent as François Labas

== Bibliography ==
- Woeller, Waltraud & Cassiday, Bruce. The Literature of Crime and Detection: An Illustrated History from Antiquity to the Present. Ungar, 1988.
