= Marie Glory =

French actress (1905–2009)

- Born: Raymonde Louise Marcelle Toully; 3 March 1905; Mortagne-au-Perche, Orne, Normandy, French Third Republic
- Died: 24 January 2009 (aged 103); Cannes, France
- Other names: Arlette Genny; Mary Glory
- Years active: 1924–1964

Marie Glory (born Raymonde Louise Marcelle Toully; 3 March 1905 – 24 January 2009) was a French actress.

== Life and career ==
Raymonde Louise Marcelle Toully was born on 3 March 1905 at Mortagne-au-Perche in Normandy. Her father was a hairdresser, whilst her mother was a painter. When she was still an infant, the family moved to Rouen, where Toully studied at the Lycée Jeanne d'Arc.

At the age of 18, Toully moved to Paris, where she began attending dance classes. In Paris, she entered the first of many beauty contests, winning second place and her first professional job, working as a model, posing for postcards and posters.

She made her film debut in 1924 with a small role in Raymond Bernard's historical epic Le Miracle des Loups under the stage name Arlette Genny, which she used until 1927.

From then on, she was credited under the name "Marie Glory". In the three hours plus French-German co-production L'Argent (1928), directed by Marcel L'Herbier, she played the lead female role alongside Brigitte Helm and Pierre Alcover. She starred with Jean Angelo, Lil Dagover, and Gaston Modot in another French-German co-production, Henri Fescourt's Monte Cristo. She made her German film debut in 1929 in Father and Son, directed by Géza von Bolváry.

Her first talking picture was Leo Mittler's Le Roi de Paris (1930), co-starring with the exiled Serbian actor Ivan Petrovich. In the 1930s, she played predominantly leading roles in such films as Les Deux mondes, directed by Ewald André Dupont, and Madame ne veut pas d'enfants, directed by Hans Steinhoff.

In 1939, she had her last leading role. She made only one film in the 1940s, Dagli Appennini alle Ande (1943). During this time, she moved to Algeria, and then Martinique, where she worked in propaganda radio.

In the early 1950s, she was cast in Italian film productions playing minor roles. Her last film appearance was in 1960; her last television appearance was in 1964.

In the mid-1990s, she was interviewed for Kevin Brownlow's documentary about the history of silent film: Cinema Europe: The Other Hollywood. Glory died on 24 January 2009, at the age of 103.

== Filmography ==
=== as Marie Glory ===
- L'Argent (dir. Marcel L'Herbier, 1928), as Line Hamelin
- Father and Son (dir. Géza von Bolváry, 1929), as Stella Valéry
- Monte Cristo (dir. Henri Fescourt, 1929), as Valentine de Villefort
- L'Enfant de l'amour (dir. Marcel L'Herbier, 1930), as Aline
- The King of Paris (dir. Leo Mittler, 1930), as Lucienne
- Les Deux mondes (dir. E. A. Dupont, 1930), as Esther Goldschneider
- Levy and Company (dir. André Hugon, 1930), as Esther Lévy
- Les Chevaliers de la montagne (dir. Mario Bonnard, 1930), as Mary
- La Folle aventure (dir. André-Paul Antoine, 1931), as Elisabeth
- The Typist (dir. Wilhelm Thiele, 1931), as Simone Dupré
- Mon béguin (dir. Hans Behrendt, 1931), as Mademoiselle Yseult
- Amourous Adventure (dir. Wilhelm Thiele, 1932), as Irène Vernier
- You Will Be a Duchess (dir. René Guissart, 1932), as Annette Poisson
- Monsieur, Madame and Bibi (dir. Jean Boyer and Max Neufeld, 1932), as Clary Baumann
- Prisonnier de mon cœur (dir. Jean Tarride, 1932), as Suzanne
- A Star Disappears (dir. Robert Villers, 1932), as herself
- Mon cœur balance (dir. René Guissart, 1932), as Geneviève
- Madame ne veut pas d'enfants (dir. Hans Steinhoff, 1933), as Elyane
- Son Altesse Impériale (dir. Victor Janson and Jean Bernard-Derosne, 1933), as Monique
- Charlemagne (dir. Pierre Colombier, 1933), as Rose Val
- The Ideal Woman (dir. André Berthomieu, 1934), as Denise
- The Typist Gets Married (dir. Joe May and René Pujol, 1934), as Simone
- Le Paquebot Tenacity (dir. Julien Duvivier, 1934), as Thérèse
- The King of Paris (dir. Jack Raymond, 1934), as Maike Tamara
- Your Smile (dir. Monty Banks and Pierre Caron, 1934), as Colette
- The Terrible Lovers (dir: Marc Allégret, 1936), as Lucie
- Death on the Run (dir. André Berthomieu, 1936), as Myrra
- With a Smile (dir. Maurice Tourneur, 1936), as Gisèle Berthier
- L'Homme sans coeur (dir. Léo Joannon, 1937), as Sylvette
- Le Porte-veine (dir. André Berthomieu, 1937), as Jeannine
- People Who Travel (dir. Jacques Feyder, 1938), as Pepita
- Terra di fuoco (dir. Giorgio Ferroni and Marcel L'Herbier, 1939), as Elena
- Naples Will Never Die (dir. Amleto Palermi, 1939), as Annie Fusco
- A Wife in Danger (dir. Max Neufeld, 1939), as Mary Arnold Verdier
- Terre de feu (dir. Marcel L'Herbier, 1942), as Hélène
- Dagli Appennini alle Ande (dir. Flavio Calzavara, 1943)
- La Folla (dir. Silvio Laurenti Rosa, 1951)
- Adorable Creatures (dir. Christian-Jaque, 1952), as Madeleine Michaud
- La Fugue de Monsieur Perle (dir. Pierre Gaspard-Huit, 1952), as Juliette Perle
- What Scoundrels Men Are! (dir. Glauco Pellegrini, 1953), as Elsa
- The Bachelor (dir. Antonio Pietrangeli, 1955), as Catherine
- And God Created Woman (dir. Roger Vadim, 1956), as Mme. Tardieu
- Rafles sur la ville (dir. Pierre Chenal, 1958), as La patronne du café
- Premier mai (dir. Luis Saslavsky, 1958)
- The Cat (dir. Henri Decoin, 1958)
- Ramuntcho (dir. Pierre Schoendoerffer, 1959), as Franchita
- The Cat Shows Her Claws (dir. Henri Decoin, 1960), as La concierge
- Les Beaux Yeux d'Agatha (TV series, 1964)

=== as Arlette Genny ===
- Le Miracle des loups (dir. Raymond Bernard, 1924)
- Monsieur le directeur (1924)
- Les Dévoyés (1925)
- La Maison sans amour (1927)
- Miss Helyett (1928)
- Little Devil May Care (dir. Marcel L'Herbier, 1928), as A little thief (uncredited)
