= Hubert Daix =

Belgian actor

- Born: 25 March 1889; Brussels, Belgium
- Died: 1960 (aged 70–71); Belgium
- Occupation: Actor
- Years active: 1922–1954 (film )

Hubert Daix (1889–1960) was a Belgian film actor.

== Selected filmography ==
- Paris in Five Days (1926)
- Prince Jean (1928)
- Not So Stupid (1928)
- The Marriage of Mademoiselle Beulemans (1927)
- The Maelstrom of Paris (1928)
- The Best Mistress (1929)
- The Ladies in the Green Hats (1929)
- Everybody Wins (1930)
- The Shark (1930)
- The Road to Paradise (1930)
- The Sweetness of Loving (1930)
- The Night at the Hotel (1932)
- Monsieur Albert (1932)
- The Beautiful Sailor (1932)
- Tossing Ship (1932)
- Mam'zelle Spahi (1934)
- The Marriage of Mademoiselle Beulemans (1950)

== Bibliography ==
- Goble, Alan. The Complete Index to Literary Sources in Film. Walter de Gruyter, 1999.
