= Fazil (film) =

1928 film by Howard Hawks

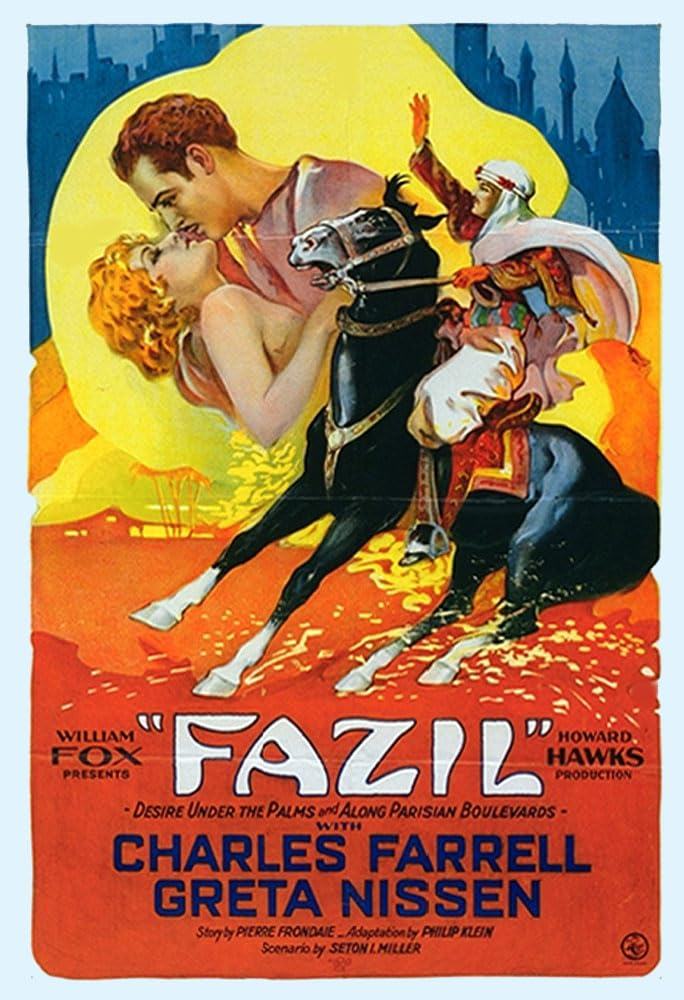
- Theatrical release poster
- Directed by: Howard Hawks
- Screenplay by: Philip Klein; Seton I. Miller; Pierre Frondaie (play: L'Insoumise)
- Produced by: William Fox
- Starring: Charles Farrell; Greta Nissen; John Boles; Mae Busch; Tyler Brooke; John T. Murray
- Cinematography: L. William O'Connell
- Edited by: Ralph Dixon
- Music by: Ernö Rapée
- Production company: Fox Film Corporation
- Distributed by: Fox Film Corporation
- Release date: June 4, 1928
- Running time: 88 minutes
- Country: United States
- Languages: Sound (Synchronized); English intertitles

Fazil (1928)

Fazil is a 1928 American synchronized sound drama film directed by Howard Hawks and written by Philip Klein and Seton I. Miller. The film stars Charles Farrell, Greta Nissen, John Boles, Mae Busch, Tyler Brooke and John T. Murray. While the film has no audible dialog, it was released with a synchronized musical score with sound effects using the sound-on-film movietone process. The film was released on June 4, 1928, by Fox Film Corporation.

== Plot ==
In Venice, Fazil, an Arabian prince, meets Fabienne, a Parisian woman, and the two fall in love and marry. Fabienne's enjoyment of modern European freedoms comes into conflict with Fazil's traditional expectations, and the couple quarrel after he takes her to his homeland.

Their impulsive marriage sparks gossip and surprise on both continents. But Fabienne's delight in modern European freedoms soon clashes with the stern traditionalism of Fazil’s desert heritage. After returning to his homeland, Fazil expects her to conform to his customs—an expectation that becomes unbearable for Fabienne. Her resistance incites a bitter quarrel, and Fazil, torn between passion and pride, leaves her to return to his ancestral palace.

There, surrounded by opulence and sand, Fazil resumes a life of seclusion and power. In scenes designed to shock and entice, he reinstates his harem—an array of lavishly adorned desert maidens (including Aicha and Zouroya), portrayed with undeniable sensuality. The sequences are decadent, even grotesque: in one infamous moment, Fazil condemns a runaway servant to be decapitated, only for the execution to be momentarily paused as the prayer hour interrupts.

Back in Paris, John Clavering, Fabienne’s faithful suitor, watches helplessly as she, still tormented by love and jealousy, resolves to win Fazil back. Fabienne travels into the heart of Arabia, arriving at Fazil's palace. Disgusted by the women who surround him, she demands they disperse. Her Western spirit clashing violently with Eastern tradition, Fabienne's defiance brings about tragic consequences.

Fazil denounces her interference, but the fire between them reignites. When Clavering arrives with a rescue party, tension erupts into violence. Fazil is mortally wounded in the ensuing chaos. In a final, horrifying gesture of possession, he poisons Fabienne with a kiss. The two die in each other's arms—united in death, if never fully reconciled in life.

== Cast ==
- Charles Farrell as Prince Fazil
- Greta Nissen as Fabienne
- John Boles as John Clavering
- Mae Busch as Helen Dubreuze
- Tyler Brooke as Jacques Dubreuze
- John T. Murray as Gondolier
- Vadim Uraneff as Ahmed
- Josephine Borio as Aicha
- Eddie Sturgis as Rice
- Erville Alderson as Iman Idris
- Dale Fuller as Zouroya
- Hank Mann as Ali

== Music ==
The soundtrack features a theme song entitled "Neopolitan Nights (Oh, Nights of Splendor)" which was composed by John Stepan Zamecnik and Harry D. Kerr.

== See also ==
- List of early sound feature films (1926–1929)
