= Shipwrecked (1939 film) =

1939 Italian film by Silvio Laurenti Rosa

- Directed by: Silvio Laurenti Rosa
- Written by: Silvio Laurenti Rosa; Leone Vitali
- Produced by: Silvio Laurenti Rosa
- Starring: Alberto Collo; Gustavo Serena
- Cinematography: Giulio Rufini
- Edited by: Silvio Laurenti Rosa
- Production company: Produzione Superfilm Italiani
- Release date: 25 February 1939
- Running time: 70 minutes
- Country: Italy
- Language: Italian

Shipwrecked (Italian: Naufraghi) is a 1939 Italian drama film directed by Silvio Laurenti Rosa. It was shot on location in Genoa using a mixture of professional and amateur actors.

== Cast ==
- Ciro Rovatti as Il cieco
- Alice Maggini as Marta
- Landa Kiss as Anna
- Alberto Collo as Il collega d'ufficio
- Gustavo Serena as L'anziano gaudente
- Daniele Chiapparino
- Elda Cuniberti
- Rosita Forcelli
- Claudio Franchi
- Carmine Romano

== Bibliography ==
- Moliterno, Gino. Historical Dictionary of Italian Cinema. Scarecrow Press, 2008.
