= The Man on the Eiffel Tower =

1950 film directed by Burgess Meredith

- Theatrical release poster
- Directed by: Burgess Meredith
- Screenplay by: Harry Brown
- Based on: A Man's Head (1932 novel) by Georges Simenon
- Produced by: Irving Allen; Franchot Tone
- Starring: Charles Laughton; Franchot Tone
- Cinematography: Stanley Cortez
- Edited by: Louis Sackin
- Music by: Michel Michelet
- Production companies: A&T Film Productions
- Distributed by: RKO Radio Pictures
- Release dates: January 19, 1950 (Montreal); January 28, 1950 (New York City); February 4, 1950 (U.S.)
- Running time: 97 minutes
- Countries: United States; France
- Languages: English; French

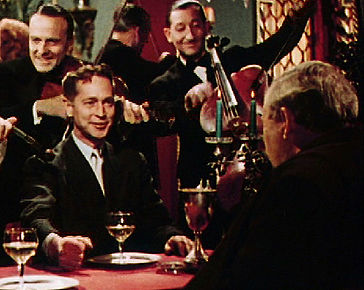
Franchot Tone and Charles Laughton sparring in Paris's Monseigneur restaurant

The Man on the Eiffel Tower is a 1949 American-French mystery film, based on the 1931 novelette A Man's Head by Belgian writer Georges Simenon, featuring his detective Jules Maigret. It stars Charles Laughton in the lead role, along with Burgess Meredith, Franchot Tone, Robert Hutton, Jean Wallace, and Patricia Roc. The film was primarily directed by Meredith, his feature directorial debut, though Laughton directed several scenes himself. It was shot entirely on-location in Paris, featuring locales like the Eiffel Tower, the Seine, Pigalle.

The film was co-produced by Tone and Irving Allen as A&T Film Productions and released by RKO Radio Pictures on December 12, 1949. For many years, the film was not widely available, due to Allen's dissatisfaction with the production.

== Plot ==
In the streets of Paris, a myopic knife grinder Heurtin is berated by his partner for both his lack of money and initiative. Nearby, idle, cash-strapped playboy Kirby enters a restaurant to meet his wife. He is warned by the waiter that both his wife and mistress are waiting for him at the bar. The wife becomes aware of his relationship with his mistress, taunting Edna that Kirby will have no money until his aunt dies, then leaves. Kirby finds a note at his feet revealing that his predicament has been overheard, and he can be helped for a million francs. He recognizes it as an invitation to murder, signed "MV". As Edna leaves, Kirby claims he has a decision to make and if he throws two aces with poker dice he'll agree. All five come up aces.

In the darkness of the aunt's house Heurtin finds a woman dead. In a panic, he falls over, losing his makeshift eyeglasses. The figure of a man appears, his feet and hands wrapped to avoid leaving prints. He intentionally steps on the glasses, and Heurtin leaves the house in literal blind terror. Outside a mysterious accomplice reassures him and promises to protect him if he lays low.

The newspapers say that both the aunt and her maid were murdered. Inspector Maigret takes the case, and finding the broken glasses soon arrests Heurtin. In prison, Heurtin's partner apologises to him for her nagging, which she realises drove him to crime. Maigret suspects that Heurtin was guilty of burglary only but won't talk, so he arranges a bogus prison escape so he can be followed. Unfortunately, the scheme backfires and Heurtin eludes his tail. At a bar where he finds the Kirby trio, Maigret spots Heurtin, who is clearly looking for his accomplice. They leave, and when a patron there ostentatiously creates a row by ordering luxurious foods he cannot afford to pay for, the police are called; Maigret suspects it is an exhibition to frighten away Heurtin.

Legwork reveals that the diner, Johannes Radek, is a brilliant and educated young man suffering from manic depression. In his elevated state he taunts Maigret, setting off a game of cat and mouse. Frightened back to the scene of the crime by Radek, Kirby shoots himself after being identified by Maigret, but gives up the letters MV before dying. Radek then sets Mrs. Kirby and Edna against one-another in an effort to implicate them in the murders.

Finally, a clever ruse by Maigret sends a cornered Radek fleeing to the Eiffel Tower, which he begins to climb. Heurtin angrily follows him up. Radek prepares to dive spectacularly from near the top, but becomes crestfallen when Maigret feigns disinterest and starts descending in his elevator cart. Plunged into depression he must be assisted down.

Maigret meets Radek one last time at the guillotine, but declines to watch. In the street outside Maigret strolls amid young Parisian couples displaying their amour. He spots Heurtin with his partner, happily wearing proper spectacles. Cheered, Maigret returns to police headquarters.

== Cast ==
- Charles Laughton as Inspector Jules Maigret
- Franchot Tone as Johann Radek
- Burgess Meredith as Joseph Heurtin
- Robert Hutton as Bill Kirby
- Jean Wallace as Edna Wallace
- Patricia Roc as Helen Kirby
- Belita as Gisella Heurtin
- George Thorpe as Comelieu
- William Phipps as Janvier
- William Cottrell as Moers
- Chaz Chase as Waiter
- Wilfrid Hyde-White as Professor Grollet
- Howard Vernon as Inspector Delon

== Production ==
The Man on the Eiffel Tower was the first English-language film featuring the Jules Maigret character. Director Julien Duvivier had already adapted Simenon's novel for film in France in 1933.

The film was initially conceived as an American-French co-production by producer André Sarrut. Peter Lorre was cast in the title role, alongside Franchot Tone and Francophone stars Claude Dauphin and Victor Francen. French financiers pulled out before shooting began, and Charles Laughton was cast as Maigret.

Irving Allen was the original director. However, only a few days of filming, Laughton was dissatisfied with Allen's direction and threatened to quit the film if he was not replaced. Laughton's friend Burgess Meredith, who was already cast as Heurtin, took over as director. Though Meredith was an experienced theatre director, he had never helmed a feature film before. His sole directorial film credit was the World War II-era training film A Welcome to Britain (1943), in which he starred and co-directed. Laughton took to directing several scenes himself, particularly those in which Meredith appeared. This notably made The Man on the Eiffel Tower the only film aside from The Night of the Hunter which Laughton directed.

Filming took place entirely in Paris between September and December 1948. The production made extensive use of locations like the Eiffel Tower, the Seine, and Pigalle. Both the poster and opening credits give star billing to the "City of Paris." Interiors were shot at Billancourt Studios and Joinville Studios. The film was shot on Ansco Color stock.

The original ending involved Radek committing suicide off the Eiffel Tower. However, French officials refused to allow the scene to be shot as scripted, afraid it might encourage actual jumps off the Tower.

== Release ==
The film had its world premiere in Los Angeles on December 12, 1949. It opened to wide release on January 19, 1950.

=== Availability ===
For many years after the film's release, it was withheld from circulation, and was believed to be a lost film. Irving Allen obtained the rights from RKO after the theatrical run, allegedly due to his discontent with Laughton's on-set behavior. Meredith himself believed the film was lost for many years. Eventually, two nitrate projection prints (one 35mm, one 35mm blowup from 16mm) were rediscovered, and used for subsequent home releases.
