= The Voice of Happiness =

1931 film

- Directed by: Léo Joannon
- Starring: Pauline Carton; René Ferté
- Release date: 28 October 1931
- Running time: 82 minutes
- Country: France
- Language: French

The Voice of Happiness (French: La voie du bonheur) is a 1931 French film directed by Léo Joannon.

== Cast ==
- Jean Dehelly
- René Ferté
- Charley Sov
- Denise Delannoy
- Simone Bourday
- Pauline Carton
- Édouard Francomme
- Monique Priola

== Bibliography ==
- Parish, James Robert. Film Actors Guide. Scarecrow Press, 1977.
