= The Beautiful Sailor =

1932 film

- Directed by: Harry Lachman
- Written by: Marcel Achard (play and screenplay)
- Starring: Pierre Blanchar; Madeleine Renaud; Jean Gabin
- Edited by: Jean Delannoy
- Production company: Les Studios Paramount
- Distributed by: Les Films Paramount
- Release date: 2 December 1932
- Running time: 80 minutes
- Country: France
- Language: French

The Beautiful Sailor (French: La belle marinière) is a 1932 French drama film directed by Harry Lachman and starring Pierre Blanchar, Madeleine Renaud and Jean Gabin. It was made by the French subsidiary of Paramount Pictures at the company's Joinville Studios in Paris.

== Synopsis ==
Marinette marries the captain of a barge after he saves her from drowning, but soon finds herself in love with Sylvestre who works with her husband.

== Cast ==
- Pierre Blanchar as Sylvestre
- Madeleine Renaud as Marinette
- Jean Gabin as Le capitaine / The captain
- Rosine Deréan as Mique
- Charles Lorrain
- Jean Wall as Valentin
- Hubert Daix as Braquet

== Bibliography ==
- Dayna Oscherwitz & MaryEllen Higgins. The A to Z of French Cinema. Scarecrow Press, 2009.
