= Léonce Cargue =

French actor (1880–1955)

- Born: 20 October 1880; Paris, France
- Died: 14 January 1955 (aged 74); Paris, France
- Occupation: Actor
- Years active: 1913-1937 (film )

Léonce Cargue (20 October 1880 – 14 January 1955) was a French stage and film actor.

== Selected filmography ==
- Prince Jean (1928)
- The Maelstrom of Paris (1928)
- Saint Joan the Maid (1929)

== Bibliography ==
- Waldman, Harry. Maurice Tourneur: The Life and Films. McFarland, 2001.
