= The Marriage of Rosine =

1926 film directed by Pierre Colombier

- Directed by: Pierre Colombier
- Written by: Pierre Colombier
- Produced by: Louis Nalpas
- Cinematography: Karémine Mérobian
- Production company: Films de France
- Distributed by: Pathé Consortium Cinéma
- Release date: 1926
- Country: France
- Languages: Silent; French intertitles

The Marriage of Rosine (French: Le mariage de Rosine) is a 1926 French silent film directed by Pierre Colombier.

== Cast ==
- Ady Cresso as Fanny Desroses
- Jean Dehelly as Piccolo
- Josyane as Rosine
- André Lefaur as Le couturier Pommier

== Bibliography ==
- Henri Bousquet. De Pathé Frères à Pathé Cinéma: 1923, 1924, 1925, 1926, 1927. Bousquet, 2004.
