= The King of Paris (1934 film) =

- Directed by: Jack Raymond
- Written by: John Drinkwater; Paul Gangelin; W. P. Lipscomb; John Van Druten (English adaptation)
- Based on: La Voie Lactee by Alfred Savoir
- Produced by: Herbert Wilcox
- Starring: Cedric Hardwicke; Marie Glory
- Cinematography: Freddie Young
- Production company: Herbert Wilcox Productions for British & Dominions Film Corporation
- Distributed by: United Artists (UK)
- Release date: 1934
- Running time: 75 minutes
- Country: United Kingdom
- Language: English

The King of Paris is a 1934 British drama film directed by Jack Raymond and starring Cedric Hardwicke, Marie Glory and Ralph Richardson. It is based on a play La Voie Lactee by Alfred Savoir based on the life of Sacha Guitry.

== Plot ==
An influential actor and impresario discovers and makes a star of a Russian girl, falls in love with her and tricks her into marriage. She however, falls in love with his friend, and desires to leave the marriage.

== Cast ==
- Cedric Hardwicke as Max Till
- Marie Glory as Maike Tamara
- Ralph Richardson as Paul Lebrun
- Phyllis Monkman as Gismonde
- O. B. Clarence as Mayor
- John Deverell as Bertrand
- Lydia Sherwood as Juliette Till
- Jeanne Stuart as Yvonne
- Joan Maude as Lea Rossignol
