= Graziella (1926 film) =

1926 film

- Directed by: Marcel Vandal
- Written by: Alphonse de Lamartine (novel); Edmond Épardaud
- Produced by: Marcel Vandal; Charles Delac
- Starring: Suzanne Dehelly; Antonin Artaud; Raoul Chennevières
- Cinematography: René Guichard; Maurice Laumann; René Moreau
- Production company: Les Films Marcel Vandal et Charles Delac
- Distributed by: Etablissements Petit; UFA (Germany)
- Release date: 23 July 1926
- Country: France
- Languages: Silent; French intertitles

Graziella is a 1926 French silent drama film directed by Marcel Vandal and starring Suzanne Dehelly, Antonin Artaud and Raoul Chennevières. It is an adaptation of the 1852 novel Graziella by Alphonse de Lamartine.

== Cast ==
- Suzanne Dehelly as Graziella
- Antonin Artaud as Cecco, le fiancé de Graziella
- Raoul Chennevières as Andréa, le grand-père
- Georges Chebat as Beppo
- Sylviane de Castillo as Madame de Lamartine
- Révérend as Le père de Cecco
- Nina Vanna
- Jean Dehelly as Alphonse de Lamartine
- Émile Dehelly as Alphonse de Lamartine âgé
- Madame Sapiani as La grand-mère
- Michel Sym as de Virieux

== Bibliography ==
- Goble, Alan. The Complete Index to Literary Sources in Film. Walter de Gruyter, 1999.
