= Jue Quon Tai =

Chinese-American vaudeville performer

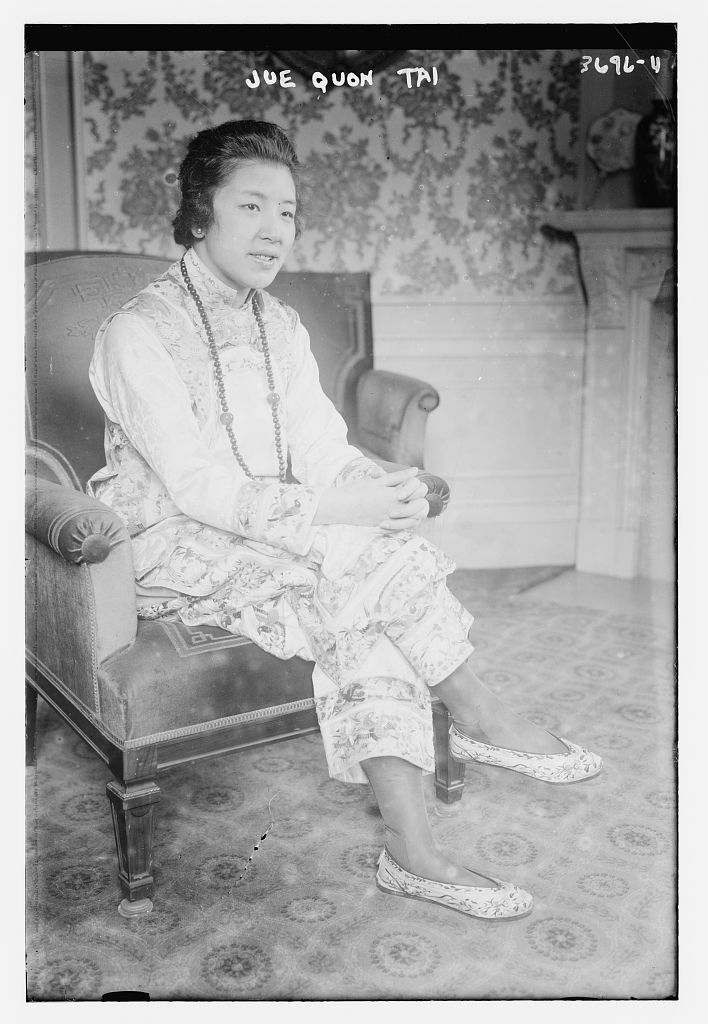
Jue Quon Tai in 1915

Jue Quon Tai (December 21, 1898 - September 24, 1991) was a Chinese-American vaudeville performer.

== Biography ==
She was born in California on December 21, 1896, or December 21, 1898, and sometimes used the Americanized name Rose Eleanor Jue or Rose Eleanor Jewel. Her mother was Bertha "Bertie" Eng Jue (1876-1955) and her father was Jue Sue, a prominent figure in Portland's Chinatown. Her younger sister, So Tai Jue (November 18, 1899-August 5, 1998), was also a vaudeville performer. So Tai Jue, also called Alice Jue or Alice Jewell, was known as the "voice of the orient". Jue Quon Tai also had two brothers, Charles and Herbert Jue, and an older sister, Leona Mary Jue.

She worked in vaudeville in Portland, Oregon, and at the Orpheum Theatre in San Francisco. She began performing at the Pantages Theatre in April 1915, receiving positive reviews. She attended the Panama–Pacific International Exposition later that year and then went to New York City.

She performed in Silks and Satins on Broadway from July 15, 1920, to September 4, 1920. She was billed as performing at the New York Hippodrome in 1925.

In 1927 she married Harry Lachman. Her husband died in 1975.

She died on September 24, 1991, under the names "Quon T. Lachman" and "Quon Tai Lachman" in Beverly Hills, California.
