= Amourous Adventure =

1932 film

- Directed by: Wilhelm Thiele
- Written by: Paul Armont (play); Marcel Gerbidon (play); Marguerite Viel; Franz Schulz; Wilhelm Thiele
- Produced by: Charles Delac; Marcel Vandal; P.J. de Venloo
- Starring: Albert Préjean; Marie Glory; Jeanne Boitel
- Cinematography: Nicolas Farkas
- Edited by: René Le Hénaff
- Music by: Ralph Erwin; Robert Gilbert
- Production company: Tobis Film
- Distributed by: Tobis Film
- Release date: 15 January 1932
- Running time: 85 minutes
- Country: France
- Language: French

Amourous Adventure (French: L'amoureuse aventure) is a 1932 French romantic comedy film directed by Wilhelm Thiele and starring Albert Préjean and Marie Glory. It was a French language version of the 1932 German film Madame Makes Her Exit which was also directed by Thiele and starred Liane Haid and Hans Brausewetter. It was shot at the Epinay Studios of Tobis Film outside Paris.

== Synopsis ==
A wealthy woman, neglected by her philandering husband, poses as a maid to gain entry into the household of a man she thinks she is in love with.

== Cast ==
- Albert Préjean as Marcel Touzet
- Marie Glory as Irène Vernier
- Jeanne Boitel as Eve
- Mady Berry as Madame Touzet
- Marcel André as Jacques Vernier
- Armand Morins as Mister Touzet
- Aimé Clariond (unknown character name)
- Raymond Cordy (unknown character name)
- Paulette Dubost (unknown character name)

== Bibliography ==
- Grange, William. Cultural Chronicle of the Weimar Republic. Scarecrow Press, 2008.
