= Eduard Müller (sculptor) =

German sculptor

Eduard Müller (9 August 1828 in Hildburghausen – 29 December 1895 in Rome) was a German sculptor.

== Biography ==
His first occupation was that of a cook in the ducal kitchen at Coburg, and he practised his trade subsequently in Munich and Paris, and thence went to Antwerp, where, on the advice of the sculptor Joseph Geefs, he proceeded to study at the Academy in 1850. Two years afterwards he continued his studies in Brussels, and in 1857 settled permanently in Rome. Among his pupils was Cesare Aureli.

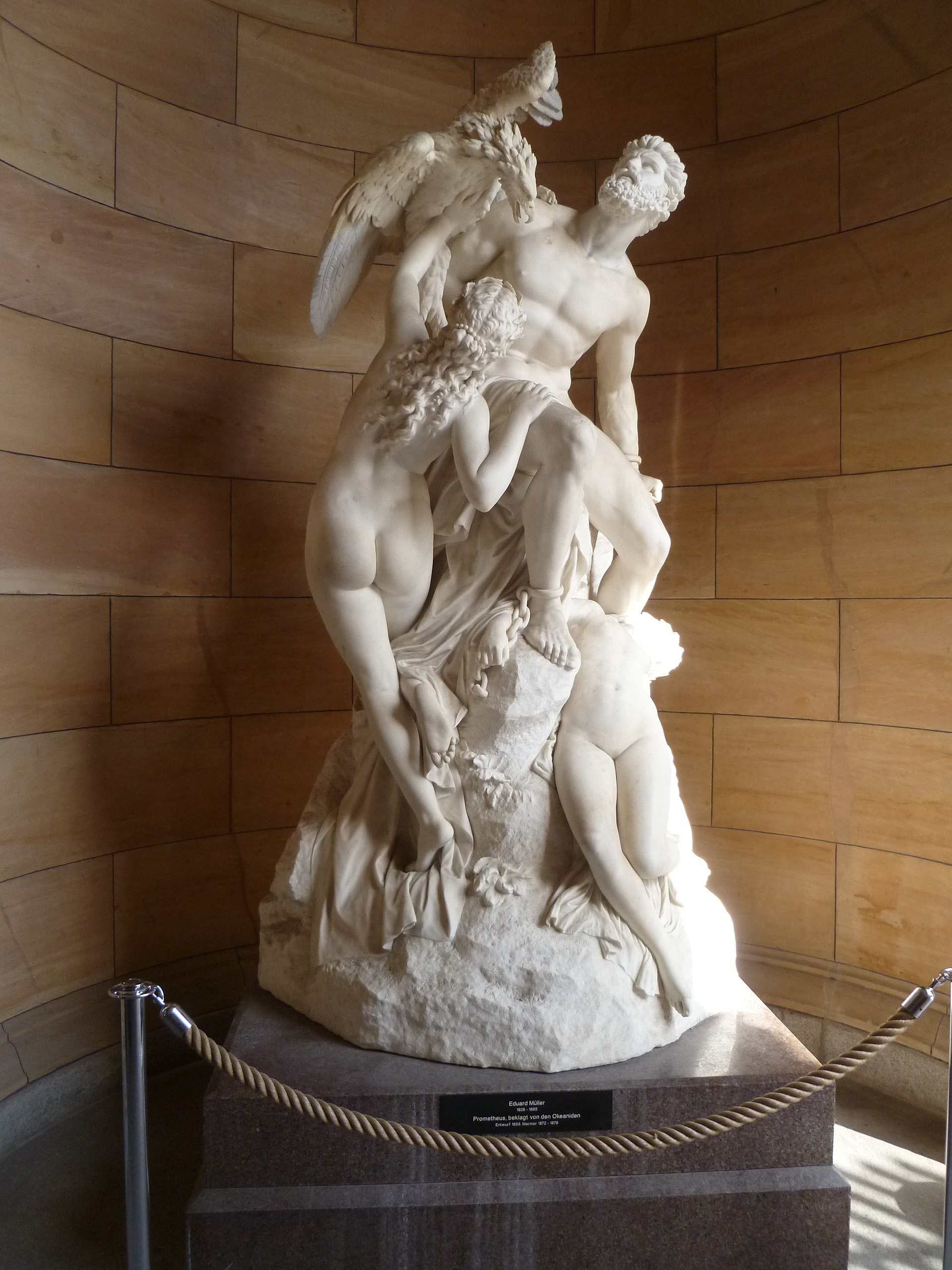
“Prometheus Bound and the Oceanids” (1872–79)

== Works ==
Masterly composition, great truthfulness to life, and a high degree of technical perfection are the chief characteristics of his ideal figures and mythological groups, the best known of which include:

- “Nymph Kissing Cupid” (Nymphe, den Amor küssend, 1862, belonging to the Queen of the United Kingdom)
- “Faith, Love, and Hope” (Glaube, Liebe, Hoffnung, 1869, for the Schröder Mausoleum, Hamburg)
- “Satyr with the Mask” (Satyr mit der Maske, 1870)
- “Waking Maiden” (Erwachendes Mädchen, 1872)
- “The Faun's Secret” (Das Geheimnis des Fauns, 1874)
- “Bacchantin, die Amor die Flügel zu beschneiden droht” (Bacchante threatening to cut the wings of Cupid, 1874)
- “The Neapolitan Fisherman and his Son” (Der neapolitanische Fischer und sein Knabe, 1875)
- Römerin mit dem Moccolilicht
- “The Terrified Nymph” (Die erschreckte Nymphe, pendant to Satyr mit der Maske)
- “Eve with Her Children” (Eva mit ihren Kindern, 1880).

His masterpiece is the group in heroic size, “Prometheus Bound and the Oceanids” (1872–79), National Gallery, Berlin, chiseled out of a single block of marble.
