= The Mystery of the Eiffel Tower =

1928 film

- Directed by: Julien Duvivier
- Written by: Julien Duvivier; Alfred Machard
- Produced by: Charles Delac; Marcel Vandal
- Starring: Tramel; Gaston Jacquet; Jimmy Gaillard
- Cinematography: René Guichard; Armand Thirard
- Production company: Le Film d'Art
- Release date: 6 January 1928
- Running time: 129 minutes
- Country: France
- Languages: Silent; French intertitles

The Mystery of the Eiffel Tower (French: Le mystère de la tour Eiffel) is a 1928 French silent adventure thriller film directed by Julien Duvivier and starring Tramel, Gaston Jacquet and Jimmy Gaillard. The film's sets were designed by the art director Fernand Delattre.

== Cast ==
- Tramel as Les frères Mironton
- Régine Bouet as Sylvanie
- Gaston Jacquet as Sir William Dewitt
- Jimmy Gaillard as Réginald
- Jean Diéner as Frakas
- François Viguier as Li-Ha-Ho
- Pierre Hot as Circus owner

== Bibliography ==
- McCann, Ben. Julien Duvivier. Manchester University Press, 2017.
- Phillips, Alastair & Vincendeau, Ginette. Paris in the Cinema: Beyond the Flâneur. Bloomsbury Publishing, 2019.
- Soister, John T. Up from the Vault: Rare Thrillers of the 1920s and 1930s. McFarland, 2004.
