= Harry Lachman =

American artist and director (1886–1975)

- Born: June 29, 1886; La Salle, Illinois, U.S.
- Died: March 19, 1975 (aged 88); Beverly Hills, California, U.S.
- Burial place: Hollywood Forever Cemetery
- Occupation: Artist

Harry B. Lachman (June 29, 1886 – March 19, 1975) was an American artist, set designer, and film director.

He was born in La Salle, Illinois on June 29, 1886. Lachman was educated at the University of Michigan before becoming a magazine and book illustrator, contributing 4 colour illustrations to the 1907 work John Smith, Gentleman Adventurer by Charles Harcourt Ainslie Forbes-Lindsay. In 1911, he emigrated to Paris where he earned a substantial reputation as a Post-Impressionist painter and was awarded the Légion d'Honneur by the French government.

Lachman's interest in motion pictures stemmed from his position as a set designer in Nice, leading to work on Mare Nostrum in 1925. He worked as a director in France and England before settling in Hollywood in 1933. His credits include Down Our Street, Baby Take a Bow, Dante's Inferno, Our Relations, and Dr. Renault's Secret.

In 1928 he married Jue Quon Tai. Lachman returned to painting in the 1940s. He died on March 19, 1975.

== Filmography ==
- Weekend Wives (1928)
- Under the Greenwood Tree (1929)
- Song of Soho (1930)
- The Compulsory Husband (1930)
- The Yellow Mask (1930)
- The Love Habit (1931)
- The Outsider (1931)
- The Man at Midnight (1931)
- Mistigri (1931)
- Insult (1932)
- The Dressmaker of Luneville (1932)
- The Beautiful Sailor (1932)
- Down Our Street (1932)
- Aren't We All? (1932)
- Paddy the Next Best Thing (1933)
- Face in the Sky (1933)
- Baby Take a Bow (1934)
- George White's Scandals (1934)
- I Like It That Way (1934)
- Nothing More Than a Woman (1934)
- George White's 1935 Scandals (1935)
- Dante's Inferno (1935)
- Dressed to Thrill (1935)
- Our Relations (1936)
- Charlie Chan at the Circus (1936)
- The Man Who Lived Twice (1936)
- When You're in Love (1937)
- The Devil Is Driving (1937)
- It Happened in Hollywood (1937)
- No Time to Marry (1938)
- They Came by Night (1940)
- Murder Over New York (1940)
- Dead Men Tell (1941)
- Charlie Chan in Rio (1941)
- The Loves of Edgar Allan Poe (1942)
- Castle in the Desert (1942)
- Dr. Renault's Secret (1942)
