= Charles Delac =

French Algerian film producer

- Born: 2 July 1885; Mascara, Oran, French Algeria
- Died: 14 January 1965 (aged 79); Paris, France
- Occupation: Producer
- Years active: 1912-1965 (film)

Charles Delac (1885–1965) was a French Algerian film producer.

== Selected filmography ==
- The Secret of Polichinelle (1923)
- Paris (1924)
- Knock (1925)
- Graziella (1926)
- The Man with the Hispano (1926)
- The Marriage of Mademoiselle Beulemans (1927)
- The Maelstrom of Paris (1928)
- The Mystery of the Eiffel Tower (1928)
- Mountains on Fire (1931)
- Moon Over Morocco (1931)
- Le Bal (1931)
- Madame Makes Her Exit (1932)
- Amourous Adventure (1932)
- The Five Accursed Gentlemen (1932)
- A Man's Neck (1933)
- The Man with the Hispano (1933)
- The Lady of Lebanon (1934)
- Love and Desire (1951)

== Bibliography ==
- McCann, Ben. Julien Duvivier. Oxford University Press, 2017.
