= Jean Dehelly =

French actor (1896–1964)

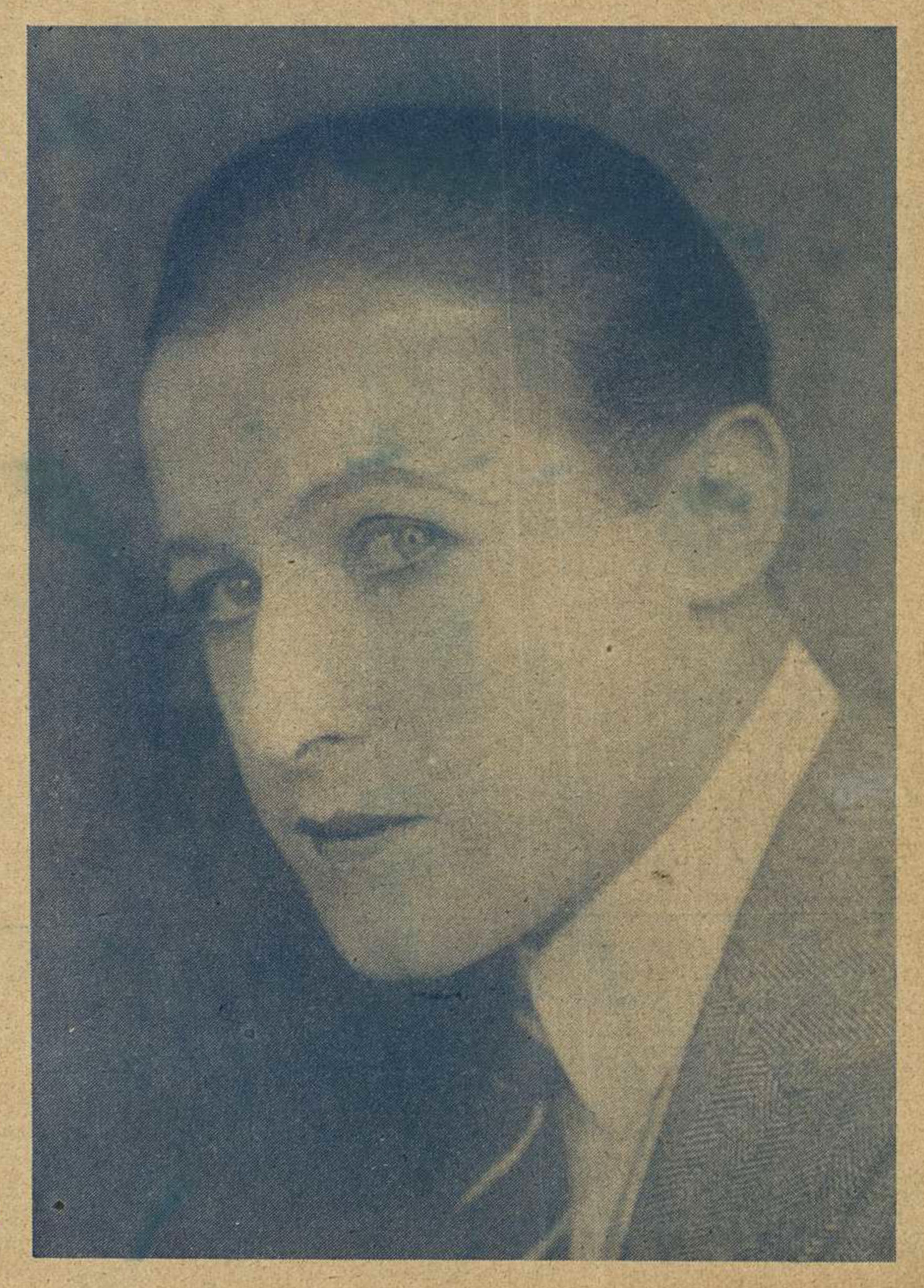
- Dehelly in 1922.
- Born: 8 March 1896; Paris, France
- Died: 1 August 1964 (aged 68); Paris, France
- Occupation: Actor
- Years active: 1909-1934 (film)

Jean Dehelly (1896–1964) was a French film actor of the silent era. He was a prominent leading man during the 1920s, but his career quickly declined after the introduction of sound. He was the son of the actor Émile Dehelly.

== Selected filmography ==
- The Secret of Polichinelle (1923)
- The Marriage of Rosine (1926)
- Simone (1926)
- Sahara Love (1926)
- Graziella (1926)
- The Dying Land (1927)
- The Woman Who Couldn't Say No (1927)
- The Marriage of Mademoiselle Beulemans (1927)
- The Ladies in the Green Hats (1929)
- The Voice of Happiness (1931)
- Your Smile (1934)
- Coralie and Company (1934)

== Bibliography ==
- Goble, Alan. The Complete Index to Literary Sources in Film. Walter de Gruyter, 1999.
- Merck, Mandy (ed.) America First: Naming the Nation in US Film. Routledge, 2012.
- Smoodin, Eric. Paris in the Dark: Going to the Movies in the City of Light, 1930–1950. Duke University Press, 2020.
