= The Two-Penny Bar =

1931 detective novel by Georges Simenon

- Original French language book cover, La Guinguette à deux sous
- Author: Georges Simenon
- Original title: (Fr.) La Guinguette a deux sous
- Language: French
- Series: Inspector Jules Maigret
- Genre: Detective fiction
- Publisher: A. Fayard
- Publication date: 1931
- Publication place: France
- Media type: Print
- Preceded by: The Dancer at the Gai-Moulin
- Followed by: The Shadow Puppet

The Two-Penny Bar (Fr. La Guinguette à deux sous, "the two-penny guinguette") is a 1932 detective novel by Belgian writer Georges Simenon, featuring his character Detective Chief Inspector Jules Maigret.

Maigret visits a condemned man is prison who tells him that six years earlier he had witnessed a body being dumped it in the Canal Saint-Martin. Maigret's investigations bring him to a "two-penny bar" on the Seine at Morsang. A man is shot outside the bar and the suspect escapes police custody. Now Maigret has two deaths to investigate. He discovers a story of blackmail, adultery and financial ruin before the killers confess.

The novel was first published in French in 1932. It has been translated into English twice and adapted for television twice.

== Plot summary ==
Detective Chief Inspector Maigret of the Paris judicial police visits a prisoner awaiting execution. The prisoner tells him that six years ago he and a friend witnessed a stranger dumping a body in the Canal Saint-Martin. They blackmailed him for two years then lost track of him. He says that he saw the man again three months ago at a "guinguette à deux sous" ("two-penny bar").

Maigret later overhears a man saying that he is going to a party at the Two-Penny Bar. Maigret follows him and discovers that he is a wealthy coal dealer named Basso who is having an affair. Basso eventually leads him to a party at an inn on the Seine at Morsang. Basso, his wife and young son are at the party. So is a man named Feinstein and his wife. Maigret realises that Feinstein's wife is the woman he saw with Basso. A shot is fired and Maigret discovers the dying Feinstein. Basso is holding a gun but swears he did not shoot Feinstein.

Basso is arrested but escapes. James, a friend of Basso, knows where Basso is hiding. He borrows a friend's car and takes Basso's wife and son to Basso's hideout.

Maigret discovers that the man whose body was dumped six years earlier was a Jewish money lender named Ulrich. Feinstein owed Ulrich 32,000 francs just before Ulrich disappeared. Maigret visits Mrs Feinstein and finds James there. She confesses that James was her lover six years previously, but she now loves Basso and plans to marry him. Maigret later discovers that Basso had known Ulrich about 15 years earlier.

A policeman discovers the Basso family's hideout by chance. Maigret questions Basso who explains that he killed Feinstein accidentally. Feinstein had asked him for money and threatened to shoot himself. When Basso wrestled the gun from him, it went off. Maigret asks him if he killed Ulrich. Basso breaks down, saying he loves his wife and son and regrets his affair with Feinstein's wife. He says that he borrowed money from Ulrich twelve years ago but did not kill him.

Maigret takes James to see Basso in his police cell. James is distressed to see his friend suspected of the murder of Ulrich. James confesses to the murder, explaining that he had borrowed money from Ulrich to pay the expenses of his affair with Mrs Feinstein. When Ulrich demanded his repayments, James killed him.

== Publication history ==
The novel was first published in French in 1932 as La ginguette à deux sous by Fayard, Paris. It has been translated twice into English: by Geoffrey Sainsbury in 1940, published as The Guingette by the Seine; and by David Watson in 2003, published as The Bar on the Seine. A revision of Watson's translation was published by Penguin Books in 2014 as The Two-Penny Bar.

== Adaptations ==
The story has been adapted for television twice: in 1962 as The Wedding Guest, with Rupert Davies as Maigret; and in 1975 as La Guinguette à deux sous, with Jean Richard in the lead role.

== Bibliography ==
- Simenon, Georges (2014). The Two-Penny Bar. Translated by Watson, David. London: Penguin. ISBN 9780141394176.
- Young, Trudee (1976). Georges Simenon, a checklist of his 'Maigret' and other mystery novels and short stories in French and in English translations. Metuchen, N.J.: The Scarecrow Press. ISBN 0-8108-0964-8.
