= Armand Thirard =

French cinematographer

- Born: 25 October 1899; Mantes-la-Jolie, Yvelines, France
- Died: 12 November 1973 (aged 74); Colombes, Hauts-de-Seine, France
- Other name: Armand Henri Julien Thirard
- Occupation: Cinematographer
- Years active: 1923–1969 (film)

Armand Thirard (25 October 1899 – 12 November 1973) was a French cinematographer. He worked on more than a hundred and twenty films during his career.

== Selected filmography ==
- The Man with the Hispano (1926)
- The Marriage of Mademoiselle Beulemans (1927)
- Nile Water (1928)
- The Mystery of the Eiffel Tower (1928)
- The Divine Voyage (1929)
- Azaïs (1931)
- Coquecigrole (1931)
- Moon Over Morocco (1931)
- The Five Accursed Gentlemen (1932)
- To the Polls, Citizens (1932)
- A Man's Neck (1933)
- The Man with the Hispano (1933)
- The Weaker Sex (1933)
- The Adventurer (1934)
- Les yeux noirs (1935)
- Bourrasque (1935)
- The Crew (1935)
- The Squadron's Baby (1935)
- Parisian Life (1936)
- Mayerling (1936)
- The Volga Boatman (1936)
- The Brighton Twins (1936)
- The Citadel of Silence (1937)
- A Picnic on the Grass (1937)
- Tricoche and Cacolet (1938)
- The Tamer (1938)
- The Patriot (1938)
- Midnight Tradition (1939)
- Sins of Youth (1941)
- Volpone (1941)
- The Murderer Lives at Number 21 (1942)
- Shop Girls of Paris (1943)
- Adrien (1943)
- Farandole (1945)
- Roger la Honte (1946)
- Pastoral Symphony (1946)
- Rendezvous in Paris (1947)
- After Love (1948)
- Miquette (1950)
- Paris Still Sings (1951)
- If All the Guys in the World (1955)
- Spring, Autumn and Love (1955)
- Mademoiselle from Paris (1955)
- Les Diaboliques (1955)
- And God Created Woman (1956)
- Three Days to Live (1957)
- The Night Heaven Fell (1958)
- The Daughter of Hamburg (1958)
- The Truth (1960)
- The Three Musketeers (1961)
- Black Sun (1966)
- Guns for San Sebastian (1968)

== Bibliography ==
- Raimondo-Souto, H. Mario. Motion Picture Photography: A History, 1891-1960. McFarland, 2006.
