= A Man's Neck (film) =

1933 film

- Harry Baur as Maigret
- Directed by: Julien Duvivier
- Written by: Pierre Calmann; Louis Delaprée; Julien Duvivier; Georges Simenon (novel)
- Produced by: Charles Delac; Marcel Vandal
- Starring: Harry Baur; Valéry Inkijinoff; Alexandre Rignault
- Cinematography: Armand Thirard
- Edited by: Marthe Poncin
- Music by: Jacques Belasco
- Production company: Les Films Marcel Vandal et Charles Delac
- Distributed by: Pathé Consortium Cinéma
- Release date: 18 February 1933
- Running time: 90 minutes
- Country: France
- Language: French

A Man's Neck (French: La tête d'un homme) is a 1933 French crime film directed by Julien Duvivier and starring Harry Baur, Valéry Inkijinoff, Gaston Jacquet and Gina Manès.It is an adaptation of the 1931 novel A Battle of Nerves by Georges Simenon, featuring the fictional detective Jules Maigret. It was the third film in cinema history to feature the Maigret character. It was remade in 1950 as The Man on the Eiffel Tower.

The film's sets were designed by the art director Georges Wakhévitch.

== Plot ==
In a Montparnasse cafe, Willy Ferrièrre (Gaston Jacquet), a gambler living beyond his means, suggests out loud that he would pay 10,000 francs for someone to kill his wealthy aunt so he can claim his inheritance. An unseen person slips him a note taking up his offer. Later, at night, a low-life criminal, Joseph Heurtin (Alexandre Rignault), enters the aunt's house, tracking footprints in the dark and following a map to the aunt's bedroom, where he expects to find a cache of money. Stumbling in the dark, he comes on the woman's dead body and with bloody hands leaves his fingerprints all over. A shadowy figure emerges (later revealed to be Radek (Vàlery Inkijinof), a Czech émigré) who assures Heurtin that he will clean up the prints and tells him to hide out. After Heurtin leaves, Radek walks out of the house and locks the door without cleaning up the crime scene.

The murder case is assigned to Inspector Maigret (Harry Baur), whose men follow the clues left to discover Heurtin's identity and track him to his parents' house in Versailles, where he has been hiding. Under arrest, Heurtin protests his innocence and tells Maigret about the other man in the murdered woman's house. The magistrate assigned to the case does not believe Heurtin's story and is ready to prosecute him, but Maigret allows Heurtin to escape and has him followed by his men. Heurtin unknowingly leads Maigret back to the cafe where Radek, who is now blackmailing Ferrièrre, draws his attention. Suspecting that a third person is involved in the murder, Maigret has several encounters with Radek, who all but confesses to the "perfect crime," but Heurtin is able to escape from police surveillance.

Though officially removed from the case for letting Heurtin escape, Maigret suspects that Radek will lead him to the person who first hired the murderer. Returning again to the cafe, Maigret sits and drinks with Ferrièrre and his mistress Edna (Gina Manès). While there, Radek, who is dying of tuberculosis, confronts Ferrièrre and Edna and takes her to his apartment, while Ferrièrre does nothing. At his apartment, Radek confesses his passion for Edna, his loneliness as he is dying, and his hatred of higher-class pretenders like Ferrièrre. While Edna struggles with Radek, Maigret and his men approach the apartment, but Radek is set on by Heurtin. In the ensuing fight, Radek shoots one of Maigret's men, but he and Heurtin are both killed. Maigret leaves the building with Ferrièrre under arrest.

== Cast ==
- Harry Baur as Commissaire Jules Maigret
- Valéry Inkijinoff as Radek
- Alexandre Rignault as Joseph Heurtin
- Gaston Jacquet as Willy Ferrière
- Louis Gauthier as Le juge
- Henri Échourin as Inspecteur Ménard
- Marcel Bourdel as Inspecteur Janvier
- Frédéric Munié as L'avocat
- Armand Numès as Le directeur de la police
- Charles Camus as L'hôtelier
- René Alexandre as Le chauffeur
- Gina Manès as Edna Reichberg
- Missia as La chanteuse des rues
- Oléo as La femme de chambre
- Line Noro as La fille
- Damia as La femme lasse
- Jérôme Goulven as Un témoin
- Jane Pierson as La cuisinière
- René Stern as Le gérard de l'Éden

== Bibliography ==
- Conway, Kelley (2004). Chanteuse in the City: The Realist Singer in French Film. University of California Press. ISBN 978-0520240193.
- Hardy, Phil (1997). The BFI Companion to Crime. University of California Press. ISBN 9780520215382.
- Spicer, Andrew (2010). Historical Dictionary of Film Noir. Scarecrow Press. ISBN 9780810873780.
