= Prometheus Bound and the Oceanids =

Sculpture in Berlin, Germany

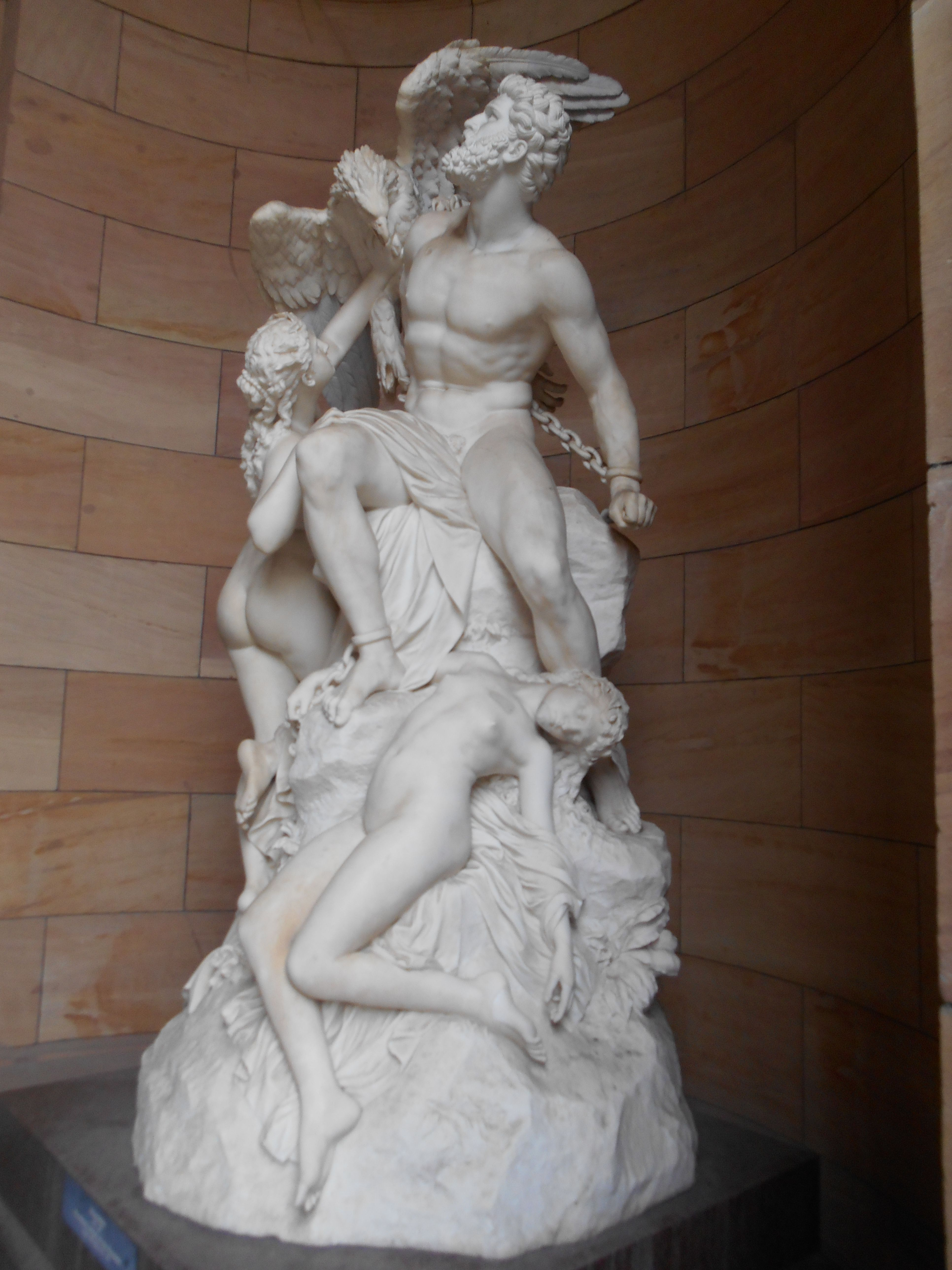
- The sculpture in 2013
- Location: Berlin, Germany

Prometheus Bound and the Oceanids (German:Prometheus, beklagt von den Okeaniden) is an 1879 marble sculpture by German sculptor Eduard Müller, located at Alte Nationalgalerie in Berlin, Germany. Its subject is from the play Prometheus Bound, traditionally attributed to Aeschylus.
