= A Man's Head =

1931 detective novel by Georges Simenon

- First edition
- Author: Georges Simenon
- Original title: La Tête d'un homme
- Translator: David Coward
- Language: French
- Series: Inspector Jules Maigret
- Genre: Detective fiction
- Publisher: Fayard
- Publication date: 1931
- Publication place: France
- English publication date: 2014
- Media type: Print
- Preceded by: The Grand Banks Café
- Followed by: The Dancer at the Gai-Moulin

A Man's Head (French: La Tête d'un homme) is a 1931 detective novel by Belgian writer Georges Simenon, featuring his character Detective Chief Inspector Maigret of the Paris judicial police.The plot involves Maigret's investigation of the murder a rich American woman and her maid for which a man might have been wrongly convicted. It has been translated into English twice and adapted for film and television nine times.

== Plot summary ==
Detective Chief Inspector Maigret of the Paris judicial police arranges the escape of Joseph Heurtin, a prisoner awaiting execution for the stabbing murder of a rich American, Mrs Henderson, and her maid at Henderson's villa in Saint-Cloud. Although Heurtin left his fingerprints and other evidence at the villa, Maigret believes he is either innocent or insane and might lead him to the real killer.

Two detectives follow Heurtin to an inn, the Citanguette, but he escapes surveillance. A newspaper publishes a story based on an anonymous letter stating that the police enabled Heurtin's escape. Forensic examination shows the letter was written at La Coupole brasserie.

Maigret visits La Coupole, where he finds William Crosby, – the nephew of Mrs Henderson and inheritor of her fortune – Crosby's wife Ellen and her friend Edna Reichberg. Maigret notices Heurtin pacing outside the brasserie. Heurtin seems to be waiting for a young red-headed man sitting in the brasserie. The red-headed man cannot pay his bill and is arrested.

After calling colleagues to follow Heurtin, Maigret learns at the police station that the redhead is Jean Radek, an impoverished Czech medical student. Maigret puts him under surveillance then questions the Crosbys, who deny knowing him.

Maigret finds Radek at La Coupole, and the Czech flaunts a large amount of cash. He taunts Maigret, telling him that he will never understand the case. He gives Maigret a bundle of new banknotes and invites him to trace the serial numbers. Maigret finds that the hotel clerk had given the banknotes to Crosby that morning in exchange for American dollars.

Maigret learns that Heurtin tried to hang himself at his parents' home in Nandy. Maigret goes to Henderson's villa and senses that someone else is there. He chases the person into an upstairs room and hears a gunshot. He breaks down the door and finds that Crosby has killed himself.

Back in his office, Maigret learns that Radek received a package the previous day via the post restante. Radek enters and admits that the package contained a large sum of cash that Crosby had handled. He tells Maigret that Crosby was in debt before he inherited from Mrs Henderson and needed money so he could leave his wife and marry his mistress, Reichberg.

Maigret follows Radek who leads him to the Citanguette inn. As Radek and Maigret watch, Ellen Crosby arrives and rips apart the mattress in the room where Heurtin slept. After she leaves, Maigret and Radek follow her to Mrs Henderson's villa. She leaves an hour later, carrying what might be a dagger wrapped in cloth. At Maigret's suggestion, they enter the villa and find Reichberg hiding in a wardrobe. Radek fires at Maigret, but his pistol is loaded with blanks. Maigret arrests him.

Maigret interrogates Radek who makes a full confession. Maigret explains to investigating magistrate Coméliau that Radek has a terminal illness. He considered himself an unrecognised genius and decided to get his revenge on the world by manipulating others and committing a perfect crime. At La Coupole, he overheard Crosby say that he would pay 100,000 francs to anyone who would kill his rich aunt. Radek sent Crosby an anonymous note accepting the offer, and in return Crosby sent Radek a key to his aunt's villa via the poste restante. Radek met Heurtin by chance and induced him to commit a supposed burglary at a specific time by saying that the villa would be unoccupied. Radek entered just before the specified time and committed the murders, knowing that Heurtin would leave incriminating evidence when he entered soon after.

Radek wrote to Ellen Crosby, informing her that Reichberg was her husband's lover and that she should search the inn and Mrs Henderson's villa because there was evidence there that would incriminate her husband. He also arranged for Reichberg to go to the Henderson villa at the same time, to see what happened when Ellen Crosby met her husband's lover there. But Maigret had intercepted Radek's letters to them and convinced them to help him arrest Radek. While he was following Radek, he had taken an opportunity to swap Radek's pistol with one loaded with blanks. Radek is executed for the murders.

== Other titles ==
The novel was originally published in French in 1931 as La tête d'un homme by Fayard in Paris. It has been translated twice into English: in 1939 by Geoffrey Sainsbury as A Battle of Nerves (and variously reprinted as A Man's Head, The Patience of Maigret and Maigret's War of Nerves), and in 2015 by David Coward as A Man's Head.

== Adaptations ==
The story has been filmed twice: In French, in 1933, as La tête d'un homme (English title: A Man's Neck) starring Harry Baur as Inspector Maigret, and in English, in 1949, as The Man on the Eiffel Tower (with Charles Laughton as Maigret.)

It has also been adapted for television seven times: in 1963, the title was changed to Death in Mind and it was filmed for the BBC series starring Rupert Davies; in Italian in 1965 (Gino Cervi) for Le inchieste del commissario Maigret; in Dutch in 1969 (Jan Teulings); and in Russian in 1992 (Vladimir Samoilov). It has been adapted for French TV on three occasions: in 1967, for the Jean Richard series, and re-made for that series in 1983; and in 1996 for the French television series starring Bruno Cremer.

== Bibliography ==
- Forshaw, Barry (2022). Simenon: the Man, the Books, the Films, a 21st Century Guide. Harpenden, UK: Oldcastle Books. ISBN 9780857305145.
- Marnham, Patrick (1994). The Man Who Wasn't Maigret, A Portrait of Georges Simenon. Harcourt Brace & Company. ISBN 0-15-600059-8.
- Simenon, Georges (2015). A Man's Head. Translated by Coward, David. London: Penguin. ISBN 9780141393513.
- Wenger, Murielle; Trussel, Stephen (2017). Maigret's World: A Reader's Companion to Simenon's Famous Detective. Jefferson, North Carolina: McFarland & Company. ISBN 978-1-4766-2925-4.
- Young, Trudee (1976). Georges Simenon, a checklist of his 'Maigret' and other mystery novels and short stories in French and in English translations. Metuchen, N.J.: The Scarecrow Press. ISBN 0-8108-0964-8.
