= Prince Jean (1928 film) =

1928 film

- Directed by: René Hervil
- Written by: Charles Méré (play)
- Starring: Renée Héribel; Lucien Dalsace; Paul Guidé
- Cinematography: Maurice Arnou; Julien Ringel
- Production companies: Films de France; Société des Cinéromans
- Distributed by: Pathé Consortium Cinéma
- Release date: 1928
- Country: France
- Languages: Silent; French intertitles

Prince Jean (French:Le prince Jean) is a 1928 French silent film directed by René Hervil and starring Renée Héribel, Lucien Dalsace and Paul Guidé. It is based on a play of the same title by Charles Méré.

== Cast ==
- Renée Héribel as Claire d'Arlon
- Lucien Dalsace as Le prince Jean d'Axel
- Paul Guidé as Robert d'Arnheim
- Simone Montalet as Mme de Grivelles
- André Dubosc as Le comte de Wavre
- Nino Constantini as Léopold d'Axel
- Georges Deneubourg as Le prince d'Axel
- Léonce Cargue as de Leyde
- Hubert Daix as Harlingen
- Pierre Saint-Bonnet

== Bibliography ==
- Goble, Alan. The Complete Index to Literary Sources in Film. Walter de Gruyter, 1999.
