= The Man with the Hispano (1926 film) =

1926 film

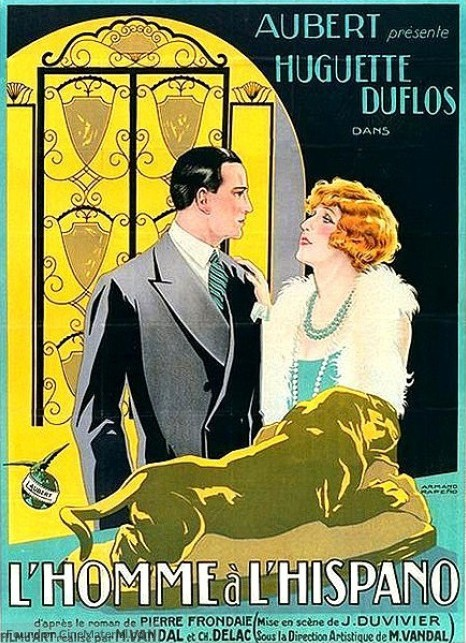
- Directed by: Julien Duvivier
- Written by: Pierre Frondaie (novel); René Hervil
- Produced by: Charles Delac; Marcel Vandal
- Starring: Huguette Duflos; Georges Galli; Acho Chakatouny
- Cinematography: Armand Thirard
- Production company: Le Film d'Art
- Distributed by: Etablissements Louis Aubert
- Release date: 18 December 1926
- Running time: 123 minutes
- Country: France
- Languages: Silent; French intertitles

The Man with the Hispano (French: L'homme à l'Hispano) is a 1926 French silent drama film directed by Julien Duvivier and starring Huguette Duflos, Georges Galli and Acho Chakatouny. The title refers to a luxury Hispano-Suiza car. It was based on a novel of the same title by Pierre Frondaie and was remade as a sound film The Man with the Hispano in 1933.

The film's sets were designed by the art director Fernand Delattre. Location shooting took place in Paris and Biarritz.

== Cast ==
- Huguette Duflos as Stéphane Oswill
- Georges Galli as Georges Dewalter
- Acho Chakatouny as Lord William Meredith Oswill
- Madeleine Rodrigue as Madame Déléone
- Anthony Gildès as Maître Mont-Normand
- Angèle Decori as Antoinette – la femme du garde-chasse
- Georges Péclet as Déléone – l'homme à l'Hispano
- Luc Dartagnan as Le garde
- Mendès as Le garde-chasse
- Angyal as La femme de chambre
- Jean Diéner
- Charles Moretti
- Raymond Narlay
- Louis Vonelly

== Bibliography ==
- Goble, Alan. The Complete Index to Literary Sources in Film. Walter de Gruyter, 1999.
- McCann, Ben. Julien Duvivier. Oxford University Press, 2017.
