= Silvio Laurenti Rosa =

Italian film director

- Born: 21 February 1892; Viterbo, Lazio, Italy
- Died: 24 December 1965 (aged 83); Rome, Lazio, Italy
- Occupations: Director, Producer, Screenwriter
- Years active: 1917–1954 (film)

Silvio Laurenti Rosa (1892–1965) was an Italian film director.

== Selected filmography ==
- Garibaldi e i suoi tempi (1926)
- Shipwrecked (1939)

== Bibliography ==
- Moliterno, Gino. Historical Dictionary of Italian Cinema. Scarecrow Press, 2008.
