= The Man with the Hispano (1933 film) =

- Directed by: Jean Epstein
- Written by: Pierre Frondaie (novel); Jean Epstein
- Produced by: Charles Delac; Marcel Vandal
- Starring: Jean Murat; Marie Bell; Joan Helda
- Cinematography: Joseph Barth; Armand Thirard
- Edited by: Marthe Poncin
- Music by: Jean Wiener
- Production company: Les Films Marcel Vandal et Charles Delac
- Distributed by: Films P.J. de Venloo
- Release date: 24 March 1933
- Running time: 95 minutes
- Country: France
- Language: French

The Man with the Hispano (French: L'homme à l'Hispano) is a 1933 French drama film directed by Jean Epstein and starring Jean Murat, Marie Bell and Joan Helda. The title refers to a luxury Hispano-Suiza car. It was based on a novel of the same title by Pierre Frondaie and had previously been made as the silent film The Man with the Hispano in 1926.

== Cast ==
- Jean Murat as Gaston Dewalter
- Marie Bell as Stéphane Oswill
- Joan Helda as Mme Deléone
- Gaston Mauger as M. Deléone
- Louis Gauthier as Maître Montnormand
- Blanche Beaume as La gouvernante
- George Grossmith Jr. as Lord Oswill

== Bibliography ==
- Goble, Alan. The Complete Index to Literary Sources in Film. Walter de Gruyter, 1999.
