= Marcel Vandal =

French film director

- Born: 1 March 1882; Paris; France
- Died: 14 April 1965 (aged 83); Le Perreux-sur-Marne, France
- Occupation(s): Film producer and director

Marcel Vandal (1882–1965) was a French film producer. During the 1910s he worked closely with the German producer Erich Pommer for the French company Eclair. Vandal served in the French Army during the First World War. He directed four silent films between 1926 and 1928.

Vandal and Pommer later collaborated following the latter's exile from Nazi Germany, firstly in Paris on Liliom (1934) and later in London for Vessel of Wrath (1938).

== Selected filmography ==
=== Producer ===
- The Secret of Polichinelle (1923)
- The Bread Peddler (1923)
- Paris (1924)
- Knock (1925)
- The Flame (1926)
- The Man with the Hispano (1926)
- The Marriage of Mademoiselle Beulemans (1927)
- The Mystery of the Eiffel Tower (1928)
- The Maelstrom of Paris (1928)
- David Golder (1931)
- Mountains on Fire (1931)
- Moon Over Morocco (1931)
- The Five Accursed Gentlemen (1932)
- Amourous Adventure (1932)
- A Man's Neck (1933)
- The Man with the Hispano (1933)
- The Lady of Lebanon (1934)
- Liliom (1934)

=== Director ===
- Graziella (1926)
- The Crystal Submarine (1927)

== Bibliography ==
- Hardt, Ursula. From Caligari to California: Erich Pommer's life in the International Film Wars. Berghahn Books, 1996.
