= List of French child actors =

This is a list of child actors from France. Films and/or television series they appeared in are mentioned only if they were still a child at the time of filming.

Current child actors (under the age of eighteen) are indicated by boldface.

== A ==
- Isabelle Adjani (born 1955)
  - Le Petit bougnat (1970)
  - Faustine et le bel été (1972)
  - L'école des femmes (1973)

== B ==
- Christophe Bourseiller (born 1957)
  - War of the Buttons (1962)
  - Une Femme Mariée (1964)
  - Two or Three Things I Know About Her... (1967)
  - Weekend (1967)

== C ==
- Timothée Chalamet (born 1995)
  - Law & Order (1 episode, 2009)
  - Loving Leah (2009)
  - Royal Pains (4 episodes, 2012)
  - Homeland (8 episodes, 2012)
- François Civil (born 1990)
  - Le cactus (2005)
  - Louis la brocante (1 episode, 2006)
  - Trop la Classe (2006)
  - Autopsy (2007)
  - Molière (2007)
  - Daddy Cool (2008)
  - Dying or Feeling Better (2008)
  - Sur ta joue ennemie (2008)
  - Flirts (2008)
- Jean Claudio (1927–1992)
  - Nostalgie (1938)
  - Rasputin (1938)
  - Boys' School (1938)
  - Crossroads (1938)
  - The Phantom Carriage (1939)
  - L'enfer des anges (1941)
  - Andorra ou les Hommes d'airain (1942)
  - The Heart of a Nation (1943)
  - Les Cadets de l'océan (1945)
- Marion Cotillard (born 1975)
  - Le monde des tout-petits (1982)
  - Lucie (1983)
  - Étude sur le Mouvement (1993)
  - Highlander (2 episodes, 1993)
- Julien Courbey (born 1976)
  - Triplex (1991)
  - À cause d'elle (1993)
  - La fortune de Gaspard (1993)
  - The Intrepids (1 episode, 1993)
  - Seconde B (76 episodes, 1993-1995)
  - Priez pour nous (1994)
  - Le clandestin (1994)
  - Navarro (1 episode, 1994)
- Lola Créton (born 1993)
  - Imago (2004)
  - Louis Page (1 episode, 2007)
  - Room of Death (2007)
  - Trouble at Timpetill (2008)
  - Bluebeard (2009)
  - Malban (2009)
  - En Ville (2011)
  - Goodbye First Love (2011)

== D ==
- René Dary (1905-1974)
  - Le Louis de vingt francs (short film, 1910)
  - Bébé (short film series, 1910-1913)
  - Le Bracelet de la marquise (short film, 1911)
  - La Cassette de l'émigrée (short film, 1912)
  - Le Petit Poucet (short film, 1912)
  - Les Ananas (short film, 1913)
- Julie de Bona (born 1980)
  - Zone Reptile (2002)
  - La vie devant nous (3 episodes, 2002)
  - Fixion (2003)
  - Un souvenir pour la vie (short film, 2004)
  - Quand les anges s'en mêlent... (2005)
  - T'as d'beaux yeux, tu sais! (short film, 2005)
  - Sœur Thérèse.com (6 episodes, 2005-2007)
  - Days of Glory (2006)
  - Demain la veille (short film, 2006)
  - Boulevard du Palais (1 episode, 2006)
  - Une famille formidable (14 episodes, 2006-2017)
  - Je déteste les enfants des autres (2007)
  - La légende des 3 clefs (2007)
  - Le tuteur (1 episode, 2007)
- Catherine Demongeot (born 1950)
  - Zazie dans le metro (1960)
  - Let's Rob the Bank (1964)
  - Les Fables de La Fontaine – Le Chat, la Belette et le petit Lapin (1966)
- Anaïs Demoustier (born 1987)
  - Marty's World (2000)
  - Time of the Wolf (2003)
  - Conflit de canards (short film, 2004)
- Roxane Duran (born 1993)
  - The White Ribbon (2009)
  - The Monk (2011)
  - 17 Girls (2011)

== F ==
- Benoît Ferreux (born 1955)
  - Murmur of the Heart (1971)
  - It Only Happens to Others (1971)
  - La Guerrilla (1972)
  - Défense de savoir (1973)
  - Le Beau samedi (short film, 1973)
- Sara Forestier (born 1985)
  - Les Fantômes de Louba (2001)
  - La Guerre à Paris (2002)
  - Quelques jours entre nous (2003)
- Brigitte Fossey (born 1946)
  - Forbidden Games (1952)
  - The Steel Rope (1954)
  - The Happy Road (1957)

== G ==
- Charlotte Gainsbourg (born 1971)
  - Paroles et Musique (1984)
  - La tentation d'Isabelle (1985)
  - An Impudent Girl (1985)
  - Charlotte for Ever (1986)
  - Kung Fu Master (1988)
  - Jane B. par Agnès V. (1988)
  - The Little Thief (1988)
- Esther Garrel (born 1991)
  - Zanzibar à Saint-Sulpice (short film, 1999)
  - Wild Innocence (2001)
  - Mes copains (short film, 2008)
  - The Beautiful Person (2008)
  - Rien dans les poches (2008)
  - Un chat un chat (2009)
  - Where the Boys Are (short film, 2009)
- Louis Garrel (born 1983)
  - Les Baisers de secours (1989)
  - Ceci est mon corps (2001)
- Maxime Godart (born 1999)
  - Little Nicholas (2009)
  - Les Meilleurs Amis du Monde (2010)
  - Le grand restaurant (1 episode, 2010)
- François Goeske (born 1989)
  - Der kleine Mann (2001)
  - Bibi Blocksberg (2002)
  - The Jungle Book 2 (2003, German singing voice of Mowgli)
  - Das fliegende Klassenzimmer (2003)
  - Rock Crystal (2004)
  - The Kids Ten Commandment (2004, German voice of Ephraim)
  - French for Beginners (2006)
  - The Last Train (2006, voice of Izzy)
  - Breaking and Entering (2006, German voice of Miro)
  - Ladyland (1 episode, 2007)
  - Die Schatzinsel (2007)
  - Tarragona - Ein Paradies in Flammen (2007)
- Patricia Gozzi (born 1950)
  - Sundays and Cybele (1962)
  - Rapture (1965)
- **Milo Machado-Graner** (born 2008)
  - Waiting for Bojangles (2021)
  - Stuck Together (2021)
  - In Therapy (3 episodes, 2021)
  - Alex Hugo (1 episode, 2022)
  - Heureusement qu'on s'a (2022)
  - Anatomy of a Fall (2023)
  - Filmlovers! (2024)
  - Le Choix (2024)
  - Mercado (2025)
  - Once Upon My Mother (2025)
- Louise Grinberg (born 1993)
  - The Class (2008)
  - 17 Girls (2011)

== H ==
- Bobby Henrey (born 1939)
  - The Fallen Idol (1948)
  - The Wonder Kid (1949)

== I ==
- Eva Ionesco (born 1965)
  - Spermula (1976)
  - Le Locataire (1976)
  - Maladolescenza (1977)
  - L'Amant de poche (1978)
  - L'Hôtel du libre échange (1979)
  - Journal d'une maison de correction (1980)
  - Meurtres à domicile (1982)

== J ==
- Joséphine Japy (born 1994)
  - Grey Souls (2005)
  - Neuilly Yo Mama! (2009)
  - The Monk (2011)
  - My Way (2012)
- Fabrice Josso (born 1967)
  - Au théâtre ce soir: Un mois à la campagne (1976)
  - François le Champi (1976)
  - Les Folies Offenbach (1 episode, 1977)
  - The Associate (1979)
  - Les Amours des années folles (1 episode, 1980)
  - Sans famille (1981)
  - Time Bandits (French voice of Kevin, 1981)
  - La nuit du général Boulanger (1982)
  - Queen Lear (1982)
  - First Blood (voice in the French dub, 1982)
  - Halloween III: Season of the Witch (French voice of Buddy Kupfer, 1982)
  - The World According to Garp (French voice of young Garp, 1982)
  - Airplane II: The Sequel (French voice of Jimmy Wilson, 1982)
  - Twilight Zone: The Movie (voice in the French dub, 1983)
  - Friday the 13th: The Final Chapter (French voice of Tommy Jarvis, 1984)
  - Cinéma 16 - La vie telle qu'elle change (1984)
  - La Famille Bargeot (1985)
  - À nous les garçons (1985)
  - Le Déclic (1985)

== K ==
- Nikolai Kinski (born 1976)
  - Paganini (1989)
  - Jamila (1994)

== L ==
- Vincent Lacoste (born 1993)
  - The French Kissers (2009)
  - Au bistro du coin (2011)
  - Low Cost (2011)
  - Skylab (2011)
  - Play It Like Godard (2011)
  - De l'huile sur le feu (2011)
- Pascal Lamorisse (born 1950)
  - White Mane (1953)
  - The Red Balloon (1956)
  - Stowaway in the Sky (1960)
- Jean-Pierre Léaud (born 1944)
  - La Tour, prends garde ! (1958)
  - The 400 Blows (1959)
  - Boulevard (1960)
  - Testament of Orpheus (1960)
  - Love at Twenty (1962)
- Martin Loeb (born 1959)
  - My Little Loves (1974)
  - Second Chance (1976)
  - Maladolescenza (1977)
- Jophielle Love (born 2014)
  - We Have a Ghost (2023)
  - Renfield (2023)
  - Quiz Lady (2023)
  - Five Nights at Freddy's (2023)
- Robert Lynen (1920-1944)
  - The Red Head (1932)
  - The Little King (1933)
  - Sans famille (1934)
  - They Were Five (1936)
  - The Fraudster (1937)
  - The Man of the Hour (1937)
  - Life Dances On (1937)
  - La vie est magnifique (1938)
  - Mollenard (1938)
  - The Little Thing (1938)
  - Education of a Prince (1938)

== M ==
- Sophie Marceau (born 1966)
  - La Boum (1980)
  - La Boum 2 (1982)
  - Fort Saganne (1984)
  - Happy Easter (1984)
  - Joyeuses Pâques (1984)

== P ==
- Georges Poujouly (1940-2000)
  - Forbidden Games (1952)
  - We Are All Murderers (1952)
  - Les Diaboliques (1955)
  - And God Created Woman (1956)

== S ==
- Ludivine Sagnier (born 1979)
  - Le Secret d'Iris (1996)
  - Vacances au purgatoire (1992)
  - La Famille Fontaine (1992)
  - Cyrano de Bergerac (1990)
  - Le Pont du silence (1990)
  - Je veux rentrer à la maison (1989)
  - Les Maris, les Femmes, les Amants (1989)
- Romy Schneider (1938-1982)
  - When the White Lilacs Bloom Again (1953)
  - Fireworks (1954)
  - Victoria in Dover (1954)
  - The Last Man (1955)
  - Die Deutschmeister (1955)
  - Sissi (1955)
  - Sissi – The Young Empress (1956)
  - Kitty and the Great Big World (1956)
- Samy Seghir (born 1994)
  - Bonne nuit Malik (short film, 2006)
  - Harkis (2006)
  - Michou d'Auber (2007)
  - Big City (2007)
  - Garçon manqué (2008)
  - Neuilly Yo Mama! (2009)
  - Des livres et moi (2009)
  - Les bleus: premiers pas dans la police (1 episode, 2009)
  - Fracture (2010)
  - Plan Biz (2010)
  - Beur sur la ville (2011)
  - Sleepless Night (2011)
  - Un temps d'avance (2011)
  - Caïn (1 episode, 2012)
- Jules Sitruk (born 1990)
  - An Angel for Chloé (1999)
  - L'Ange tombé du ciel (2000)
  - P.J. (one episode, 2000)
  - Sans famille (2 episodes, 2000)
  - Docteur Sylvestre (1 episode, 2000)
  - Le pain (short film, 2001)
  - Frailty (French voice of Adam Meiks as a child, 2001)
  - Sauveur Giordano (1 episode, 2001)
  - The Lord of the Rings: The Two Towers (French voice of Haleth, 2002)
  - Monsieur Batignole (2002)
  - Haute Pierre (2002)
  - Signs (French voice of Morgan Hess, 2003)
  - I, Cesar (2003)
  - Vipère au poing (2004)
  - Godsend (French voice of Adam Duncan, 2004)
  - Birth (French voice of Sean Contre, 2004)
  - The Butterfly Effect (French voice of 7-year old Evan Treborn, 2004)
  - Alexander (French voice of Alexander as a child, 2004)
  - Les Aiguilles rouges (2006)
  - Son of Rambow (2007)

== T ==
- Victoire Thivisol (born 1991)
  - Ponette (1996)
  - Children of the Century (1999)
- Steve Tran (born 1985)
  - Regards d'enfance (1 episode, 2000)
  - Les résultats du bac (short film, 2001)
  - Lovely Rita, sainte patronne des cas désespérés (2003)
  - Poulet cocotte (short film, 2003)
  - P.J. (1 episode, 2003)

== V ==
- Sylvie Vartan (born 1944)
  - Pod igoto (1952)
  - Un clair de lune à Maubeuge (1962)
- Judith Vittet (born 1984)
  - The City of Lost Children (La Cité des enfants perdus) (1995)
  - Nelly and Mr. Arnaud (1995)
  - K (1997)
- Marina Vlady (born 1938)
  - Summer Storm (1949)
  - Due sorelle amano (1950)
  - Pardon My French (1951)
  - Dans la vie tout s'arrange (1952)
  - Black Feathers (1952)
  - The Unfaithfuls (1953)
  - Finishing School (1953)
  - Too Young for Love (1953)
  - Cavalcade of Song (1953)
  - Musoduro (1953)
  - Before the Deluge (1954)
  - She (1954)
  - Days of Love (1954)
  - Sins of Casanova (1955)
  - The Hotshot (1955)
  - Sophie and the Crime (1955)
  - Les salauds vont en enfer (1955)
  - Symphony of Love (1956)
  - Forgive Us Our Trespasses (1956)
  - La Sorcière (1956)
  - Crime and Punishment (1956)
