= Julien Duvivier filmography =

Julien Duvivier (8 October 1896, in Lille – 29 October 1967, in Paris) was a French film director. He rose to prominence in French cinema in the silent era, and directed some of the most notable films of the poetic realism in the 1930s, such as La belle équipe and Pépé le Moko. During World War II he worked in the United States. He returned to France with Panic (Panique) in 1946 and continued to work in Europe for the rest of his career. He had a big commercial success with The Little World of Don Camillo which had 12.8 million admissions in 1952. His last film was Diabolically Yours from 1967.

== Filmography ==
Year	English title	Original title	Production country	Notes
1919		Haceldama ou le prix du sang	France	
1920	The Reincarnation of Serge Renaudie	La réincarnation de Serge Renaudier	France	
1922	The Death Agony of the Eagles	L'agonie des aigles	France	co-directed with Dominique Bernard-Deschamps
1922		Les roquevillard	France	
1922	The Sinister Guest	Der unheimliche Gast / Le logis de l'horreur	Germany	
1922	The Hurricane on the Mountain	L'ouragan sur la montagne	France	
1923	The Reflection of Claude Mercœur	Le reflet de Claude Mercœur	France	
1924	A Machine for Recreating Life	La machine à refaire la vie	France	Documentary
1924		Credo ou la tragédie de Lourdes	France	
1924		L'œuvre immortelle	France	
1924		Cœurs farouches	France	
1925	The Red Head	Poil de carotte	France	
1925	The Abbot Constantine	L'abbé Constantin	France	
1926	The Man with the Hispano	L'Homme à l'Hispano	France	
1927	The Marriage of Mademoiselle Beulemans	Le mariage de Mademoiselle Beulemans	France	
1927		L'agonie de Jérusalem	France	
1928	The Mystery of the Eiffel Tower	Le mystère de la tour Eiffel	France	
1928	The Maelstrom of Paris	Le tourbillon de Paris	France	
1929	The Miraculous Life of Thérèse Martin	La Vie miraculeuse de Thérèse Martin	France	
1929	Mother Hummingbird	Maman Colibri	France	
1929	The Divine Voyage	La divine croisière	France	
1930	The Ladies’ Paradise	Au bonheur des dames	France	
1931	David Golder	David Golder	France	Duvivier's first sound film
1931	Moon Over Morocco	Les cinq gentlemen maudits	France	French language version
1931	Here's Berlin	Allo Berlin? Ici Paris!	France	
1932	The Five Accursed Gentlemen	Die fünf verfluchten Gentlemen	France	German language version
1932		La vénus du collège	France	
1932	The Red Head	Poil de carotte	France	
1933	A Man's Neck	La Tête d'un homme	France	
1933	The Little King	Le petit roi	France	
1933	A Machine for Recreating Life	La machine à refaire la vie	France	
1934	S.S. Tenacity	Le paquebot Tenacity	France	
1934	Maria Chapdelaine	Maria Chapdelaine	France	
1935	Golgotha	Golgotha	France	
1935	La Bandera	La Bandera	France	
1936	The Golem	Le golem	Czechoslovakia	
1936	The Man of the Hour	L'homme du jour	France	
1936	La Belle Équipe	La belle équipe	France	AKA They Were Five
1937	Pépé le Moko	Pépé le Moko	France	
1937	Dance Program	Un carnet de bal	France	AKA Dance of Life and Life Dances On
1938	Marie Antoinette	Marie Antoinette	USA	uncredited, co-directed with W.S. Van Dyke
1938	The Great Waltz	The Great Waltz	United States	
1939	The End of the Day	La Fin du jour	France	
1939	The Phantom Carriage	La charrette fantôme	France	
1941	Lydia	Lydia	United States	Remake of Dance Program
1942	Tales of Manhattan	Tales of Manhattan	United States	
1943	Flesh and Fantasy	Flesh and Fantasy	United States	
1943	The Heart of a Nation	Untel père et fils	France	
1944	The Impostor	The Impostor	United States	
1944	Destiny	Destiny	United States	uncredited, co-directed with Reginald LeBorg
1946	Panic (Panique)	Panique	France	
1948	Anna Karenina	Anna Karenina	United Kingdom	
1949	The Sinners	Au royaume des cieux	France	
1950	Black Jack	Black Jack	Spain, United States and France	
1951	Under the Sky of Paris	Sous le ciel de Paris	France	
1952	The Little World of Don Camillo	Le Petit monde de Don Camillo	France	
1952	Holiday for Henrietta	La Fête à Henriette	France	
1953	The Return of Don Camillo	Le Retour de Don Camillo	France	
1954	On Trial	L'affaire Maurizius	France and Italy	
1955	Marianne of My Youth	Marianne de ma jeunesse	France and West Germany	Shot in (almost identical) French and German version
1956	Twelve Hours to Live	Voici le temps des assassins	France	AKA Deadlier Than the Male
1957	The Man in the Raincoat	L'Homme à l'imperméable	France and Italy	
1957	Lovers of Paris	Pot-Bouille	France	
1959	The Woman and the Puppet	La Femme et le Pantin	France and Italy	
1959	Marie-Octobre	Marie-Octobre	France	
1960	The High Life	La Grande vie	France, West Germany and Italy	
1960	Boulevard	Boulevard	France	
1962	The Burning Court	La chambre ardente	France, Italy and West Germany	
1963	The Devil and the Ten Commandments	Le Diable et les Dix Commandements	France	
1963	Highway Pickup	Chair de poule	France	
1967	Diabolically Yours	Diaboliquement vôtre	France and West Germany	
