= Robert Lynen =

French actor

Robert Lynen (24 May 1920 in Nermier, France – 1 April 1944 in Karlsruhe, Germany) was a French actor. A child star of French cinema, he joined the French Resistance during his country's occupation during World War II, was arrested and deported to Germany, and shot by a Nazi firing squad after repeated escape attempts.

== Acting career ==
Lynen was born on 24 May 1920 in Nermier and spent the first years of his life in his native Jura, where his parents raised animals. In 1923, his family moved to Paris where his father became a draftsman.

Being from an artistic family (his father painted and his mother was a singer and pianist), he was noticed at age 12 by filmmaker Julien Duvivier while he was studying at the École du Spectacle. After some tests, he was cast for the lead role of Poil de carotte (1932) with Harry Baur.

Following the film's public success, Lynen became the child star of French cinema. He played Rémi in the 1934 film adaptation of Hector Malot's novel, Sans Famille.

In 1937, he acted in Robert Siodmak's movie Mollenard, then in Le Fraudeur by Léopold Simons.

At age 18, he played Alphonse Daudet's Le Petit Chose for Maurice Cloche, then La vie est magnifique with the same filmmaker.

== World War II ==
In 1940, at age 20, he acted in Espoirs by Willy Rozier, before being sent to a Vichy-sponsored youth camp, where he joined the French Resistance, becoming a second lieutenant in the French Forces network Alliance. In 1941, he went on a theater tour and acted in his last film Cap au large by Jean-Paul Paulin.

He performed many missions before being arrested by the Gestapo in Cassis, on 7 February 1943. He was tortured and deported to Germany. After several months in prison, and two escape attempts, he was sentenced to death by a military tribunal and executed, with 14 other Resistance members, on 1 April 1944 in Karlsruhe, at the age of 23. When his body, which had been buried in a common grave, was repatriated to France in 1947, it was reburied in the military section of the Gentilly cemetery.

== Filmography ==
- The Red Head (1932) as Poil de carotte
- Le Petit Roi (1933) as Michel VIII
- Sans famille (1934) as Rémy
- La Belle Équipe (1936) as René
- Life Dances On (1937) as Jacques Dambreval
- The Man of the Hour (1937) as Milo
- The Fraudster (1937) as Theo
- Education of a Prince (1938) as Prince Sacha
- The Little Thing (1938) as Daniel Eyssette
- Mollenard (1938) as Jean Mollenard
- La vie est magnifique (1938)
- Hopes (1941) as Pierre Martin
- Cap au large (1942) as Zizou

== Bibliography ==
- Holmstrom, John. The Moving Picture Boy: An International Encyclopaedia from 1895 to 1995, Norwich, Michael Russell, 1996, p. 104-105.
