= Alcazar (Paris) =

Former café-chantant in Paris, France

Coordinates: 48°52′18″N 2°20′53″E

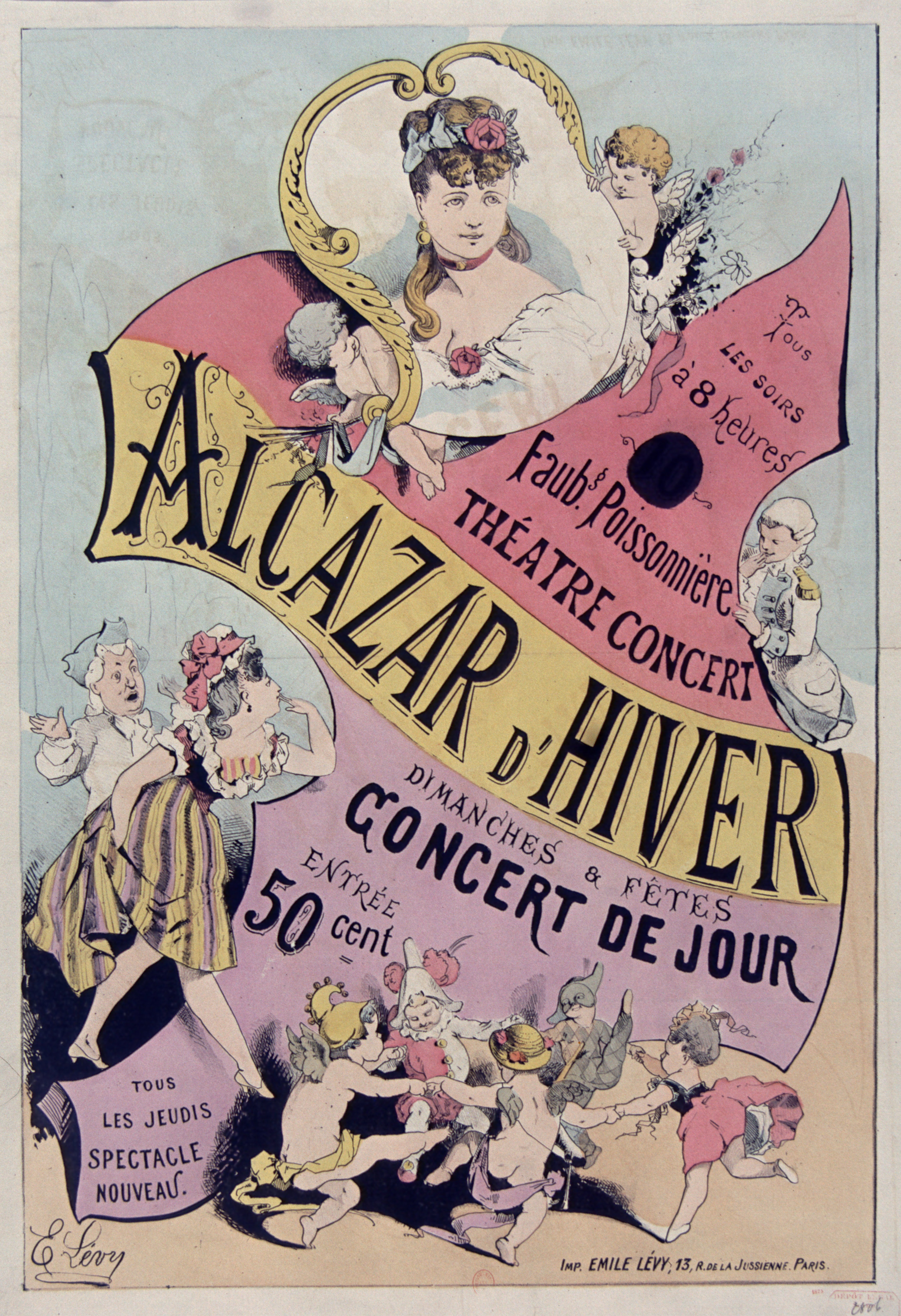
1875 poster

The Alcazar (later Alcazar d'Hiver) was a Café-concert which opened in 1858, located at 10 Rue du Faubourg Poissonière in Paris, and closed in 1902.

This café-concert was first directed by Joseph Mayer, then by Arsène Goubert who attracted the singer Thérésa (Emma Valladon) from her position at the Eldorado. She sang for the first time as a comic actress and gained a triumph, becoming the first true star of the café-concert.

Goubert acquired another establishment, on the Champs-Elysées, which he called "Alcazar d'Été", logically renaming the "Alcazar" to "Alcazar d'Hiver". On the departure of Thérésa, the place often changed names and proprietors. It was demolished in 1902 to be replaced by offices.

== Principal artists featured ==
- Thérésa (Emma Valladon)
- Jeanne Bloch
- La Goulue
- Eugénie Buffet
- Anna Thibaud
