= National Board of Review Awards 1937 =

Annual US film awards ceremony

9th National Board of Review Awards

December 30, 1937

The 9th National Board of Review Awards for American cinema were announced on 30 December 1937.

== Best American Films ==
1. Night Must Fall
2. The Life of Emile Zola
3. Black Legion
4. Camille
5. Make Way for Tomorrow
6. The Good Earth
7. They Won't Forget
8. Captains Courageous
9. A Star Is Born
10. Stage Door

== Top Foreign Films ==
1. The Eternal Mask
2. The Lower Depths
3. Baltic Deputy
4. Mayerling
5. The Spanish Earth
6. Golgotha
7. Elephant Boy
8. Jánošík
9. The Wedding of Palo

== Winners ==
- Best American Film: Night Must Fall
- Best Foreign Film: Die ewige Maske (The Eternal Mask), Austria/Switzerland
- Best Acting:
  - Harry Baur - Golgotha
  - Humphrey Bogart - Black Legion
  - Charles Boyer - Conquest
  - Nikolai Cherkassov - Baltic Deputy
  - Danielle Darrieux - Mayerling
  - Greta Garbo - Camille
  - Robert Montgomery - Night Must Fall
  - Maria Ouspenskaya - Conquest
  - Luise Rainer - The Good Earth
  - Joseph Schildkraut - The Life of Emile Zola
  - Dame May Whitty - Night Must Fall
  - Mathias Wieman - The Eternal Mask
