= Saint-Aubin, Jura =

Commune in Bourgogne-Franche-Comté, France

Saint-Aubin
- Commune
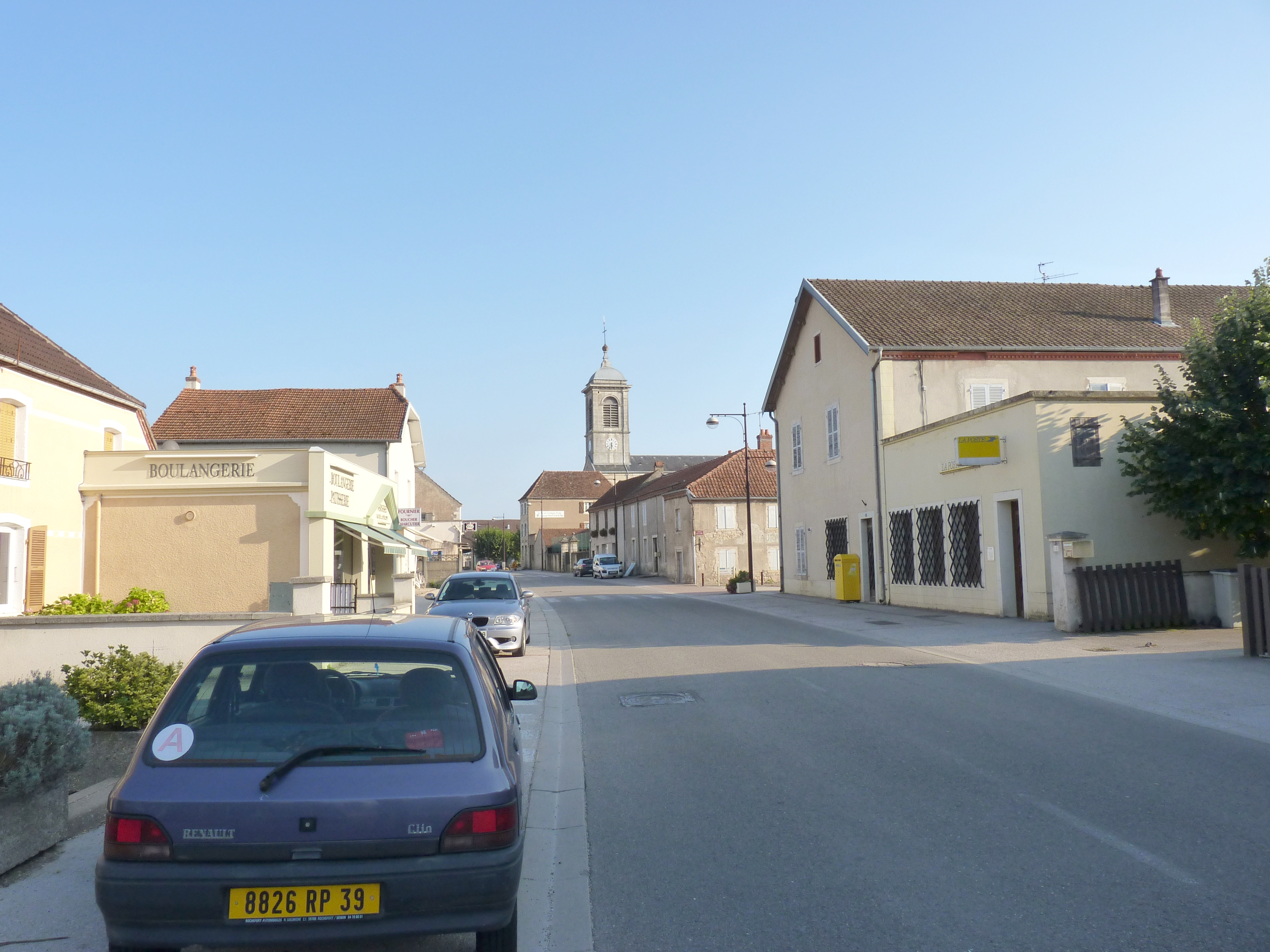
- The main road in Saint-Aubin

- Coat of arms
- Location of Saint-Aubin
- Location within France Location within Bourgogne-Franche-Comté
- Coordinates: 47°01′59″N 5°19′52″E
- Country: France
- Region: Bourgogne-Franche-Comté
- Department: Jura
- Arrondissement: Dole
- Canton: Tavaux
- Intercommunality: CA Grand Dole

Government
  - Mayor (2020–2026): Jean-Yves Roy
- Area^{1}: 33.76 km^{2} (13.03 sq mi)
- Highest elevation: 192 m (630 ft)
- Lowest elevation: 180 m (590 ft)
- Population (2023): 1,871
  - Density: 55.42/km^{2} (143.5/sq mi)
- Time zone: UTC+01:00 (CET)
  - Summer (DST): UTC+02:00 (CEST)
- INSEE/Postal code: 39476 /39410
- ^{1} French Land Register data, which excludes lakes, ponds, glaciers > 1 km^{2} (0.386 sq mi or 247 acres) and river estuaries.

Saint-Aubin (French pronunciation: [sɛ̃.t‿obɛ̃]) is a village and commune in the Jura department in the Bourgogne-Franche-Comté region in eastern France.

It is the birthplace of the noted singer Anna Thibaud (1861–1948).

== Population ==
Historical population
Year	Pop.	±% p.a.
1968	1,471	—
1975	1,557	+0.81%
1982	1,544	−0.12%
1990	1,520	−0.20%
1999	1,539	+0.14%
2007	1,714	+1.36%
2012	1,773	+0.68%
2017	1,800	+0.30%
2023	1,871	+0.65%
Source: INSEE

== See also ==
- Communes of the Jura department
