= Hopes (film) =

1941 film

- Directed by: Willy Rozier
- Written by: Willy Rozier
- Based on: A Village Romeo and Juliet by Gottfried Keller
- Produced by: Willy Rozier
- Starring: Constant Rémy; Pierre Larquey; Robert Lynen
- Cinematography: [Marius Roger
- Edited by: Willy Rozier
- Music by: Jean Yatove
- Production company: Sport-Films
- Distributed by: Les Films de Koster
- Release date: 19 March 1941
- Running time: 92 minutes
- Country: France
- Language: French

Hopes (French: Espoirs) is a 1941 French drama film directed by Willy Rozier and starring Constant Rémy, Pierre Larquey and Robert Lynen. It is based on the 1856 novella A Village Romeo and Juliet by Gottfried Keller. The story is inspired by William Shakespeare's Romeo and Juliet shifted to a country setting.

== Cast ==
- Constant Rémy as Aubert
- Pierre Larquey as Martin
- Robert Lynen as Pierre Martin
- Jacqueline Roman as Isabelle Aubert
- Gaston Jacquet as Grigou
- Jean Sinoël
- Cécile Didier
- Victor Vina
- Marfa d'Hervilly
- Anthony Gildès
- Jean Brochard
- Julien Maffre
- Laurence Richard

== Bibliography ==
- Bladen, Victoria, Hatchuel, Sarah & Vienne-Guerrin, Nathalie (ed.) Shakespeare on Screen: Romeo and Juliet. Cambridge University Press, 2023.
- Goble, Alan. The Complete Index to Literary Sources in Film. Walter de Gruyter, 1999.
- Rège, Philippe. Encyclopedia of French Film Directors, Volume 1. Scarecrow Press, 2009.
