= Flower of Paris =

1916 film

- Directed by: André Hugon
- Starring: Mistinguett; Harry Baur; Louis Paglieri
- Production company: Pathé Frères
- Distributed by: Pathé Frères
- Release date: 3 November 1916
- Running time: 40 minutes
- Country: France
- Languages: Silent; French intertitles

Flower of Paris (French: Fleur de Paris) is a 1916 French silent film directed by André Hugon and starring Mistinguett, Harry Baur and Louis Paglieri.

== Synopsis ==
The tribulations of Margot, a poor seamstress who admires Mistinguett.

== Cast ==
- Mistinguett as Margot Panard et Mistinguett
- Harry Baur as Harry Podge
- Louis Paglieri
- Guita Dauzon
- Marc Gérard

== Bibliography ==
- Rège, Philippe. Encyclopedia of French Film Directors, Volume 1. Scarecrow Press, 2009.
