= The Gold Chignon =

- Directed by: André Hugon
- Written by: Yves Mirande
- Starring: Mistinguett; Harry Baur
- Release date: 15 May 1916
- Running time: 50 minutes
- Country: France
- Languages: Silent; French intertitles

The Gold Chignon (French:Chignon d'or) is a 1916 French silent film directed by André Hugon and starring Mistinguett and Harry Baur.

== Cast ==
- Mistinguett as Mistinguett
- Harry Baur as Harry

== Bibliography ==
- Rège, Philippe. Encyclopedia of French Film Directors, Volume 1. Scarecrow Press, 2009.
