= Mistinguett =

French actress and singer (1873–1956)

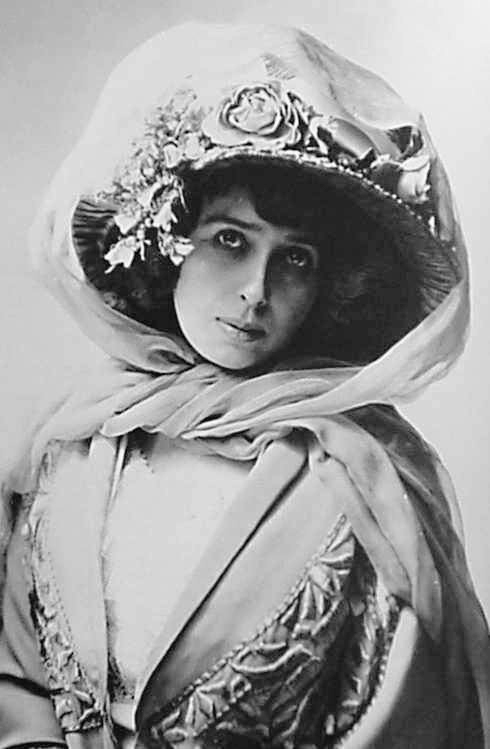
- Mistinguett, c. 1900, by Paul Nadar
- Born: Jeanne Florentine Bourgeois; 5 April 1873; Enghien-les-Bains, France
- Died: 5 January 1956 (aged 82); Bougival, France

Jeanne Florentine Bourgeois (5 April 1873 – 5 January 1956), known professionally as Mistinguett (French: [mistɛ̃ɡɛt]), was a French actress and singer. She was at one time the highest-paid female entertainer in the world. At the time of her unofficial retirement in 1955, Mistinguett had 60 years of experience under her belt. Mistinguett has been credited with performing in 31 movies, 9 shows, and 389 musical works.

== Early life ==
The daughter of Antoine Bourgeois, a 31-year-old day-labourer, and Jeannette Debrée, a 21-year-old seamstress, Jeanne Bourgeois was born at 5 Rue du Chemin-de-Fer (today Rue Gaston-Israël), in Enghien-les-Bains, Val-d'Oise, Île-de-France, France. The family moved to Soisy-sous-Montmorency where she spent her childhood; her parents later worked as mattress-makers.

At an early age Bourgeois aspired to be an entertainer. She began as a flower seller in a restaurant in her hometown, singing popular ballads as she sold blossoms. At the young age of 10 she managed to get a job raising and lowering curtains at the Casino de Paris.

== Entertainer ==
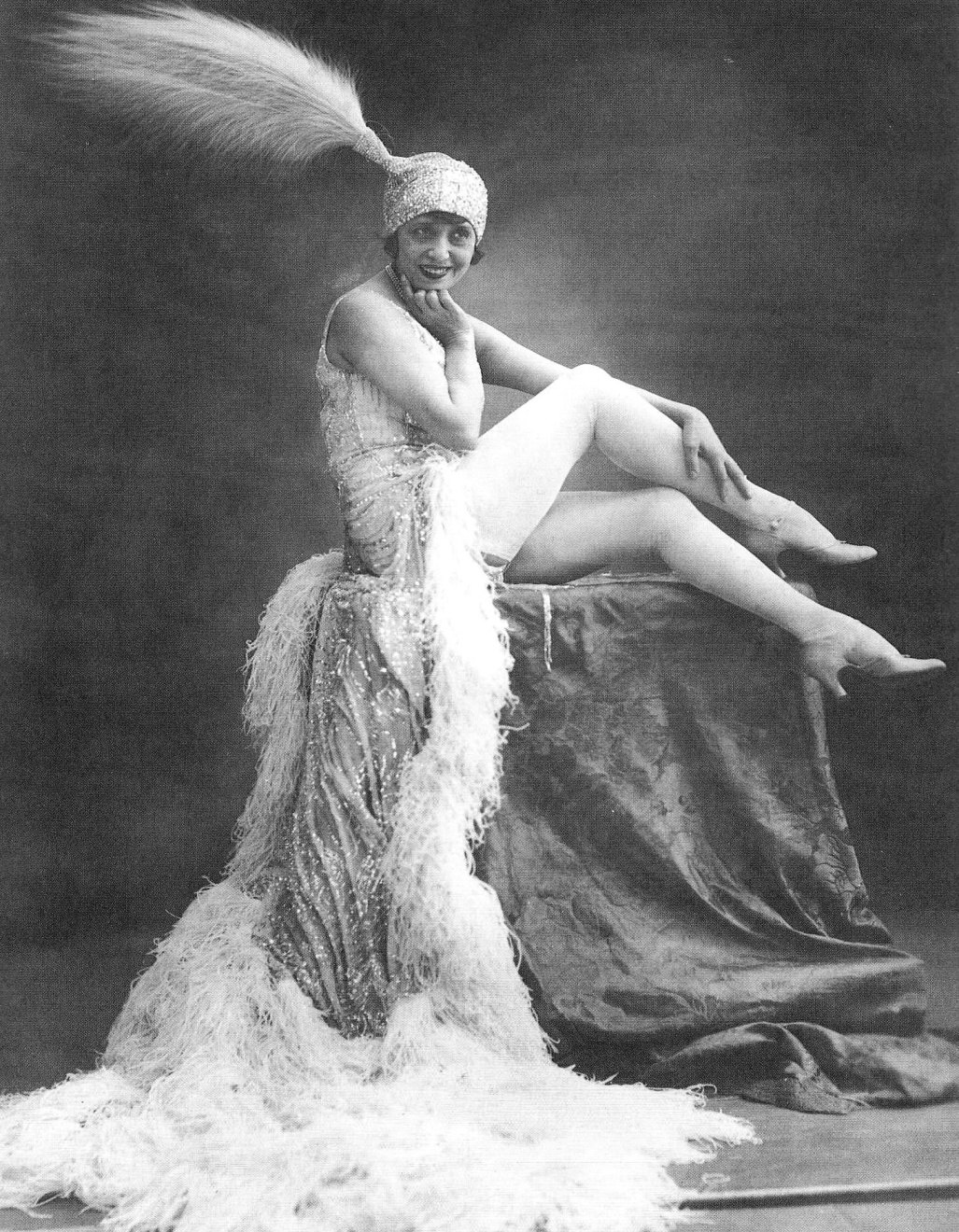
Mistinguett at the Moulin Rouge

After taking classes in theatre and singing, she began her career as an entertainer in the 1880s. One day on the train to Paris for a violin lesson, she met Saint-Marcel, who directed the revue at the Casino de Paris. He engaged her first as a stage-hand, and here she began to pursue her goal to become an entertainer, experimenting with various stage-names, being successively Miss Helyett, Miss Tinguette, Mistinguette and, finally, Mistinguett. In the 1880s Mistinguett visited her neighbour Anna Thibaud to ask for advice. Thibaud told her, "To succeed in the theatre ... you must be pretty. You must excite men." Mistinguett asked if she meant that she had to excite the crowds. Thibaud repeated, "No, the men!"

Bourgeois made her first appearance in a major musical all at the Casino de Paris in 1893 and went on to appear in venues such as the Folies Bergère, Moulin Rouge and Eldorado. Her risqué routines captivated Paris, and by 1919 she was touring internationally in Russia, England, and the Americas. She made her first silent movie in 1908 and her first 'talkie' in 1936. She would become the most popular French entertainer of her time and the highest-paid female entertainer in the world, known for her flamboyance and a zest for the theatrical. In 1919, her legs were insured for 500,000 Francs.

She first recorded her signature song, "Mon Homme" in 1920. It was popularised under its English title "My Man" by Fanny Brice and has become a standard in the repertoire of numerous pop and jazz singers.

During a tour of the United States, Mistinguett was asked by Time magazine to explain her popularity. Her answer was, "It is a kind of magnetism. I say 'Come closer' and draw them to me."

What was widely considered one of her best revues was 1938's Féerie de Paris, where Mistinguett returned to the Casino de Paris in a 7-foot tall headress, 20-foot long train, and 40 pounds of feathers. At the age of 65 the actress still managed to make a grand entrance, walking down a silver staircase with elegant grace. Her opening number, Je Cherche un Millionaire, became a best seller with 5 million copies sold by the time WW2 erupted.

Mistinguett would continue to perform well into her 70s, opening her last Paris Qui __ revue and touring North America despite a knee ailment, two minor heart attacks, an appendectomy, and a hysterectomy.

On her deathbed she proclaimed, "My real lovers are the ones I've never seen – the men and women sitting there, up in the gallery. I belonged to the public, because I owed them everything."

== Personal life ==
Mistinguett had many male admirers over the years, and her active sex life was something she refused to give up even as she refined herself during her rise to fame. But she chose her partners carefully, being credited to the quote "The ideal partner is the one who makes the public say, 'They go well together,' and not the one you personally like the most."

Though Mistinguett never married, she had a son, Leopoldo João de Lima e Silva, born in 1901, from a liaison she had with a Brazilian diplomat, Leopoldo José de Lima e Silva (1872–1931). Lima agreed to raise Leopoldo in Brazil as Mistinguett grew her career; Leopoldo would return to Paris at the age of 14 when WW2 broke out.

Another one of her lovers was the dancer Max Dearly, the two of them being partners both on and off stage. The two debuted their valse chaloupée or 'Apache Dance' together at the Moulin Rogue in 1909, and continued to perform it periodically over the next decade.

One of her longest running relationships was with Maurice Chevalier, 15 years her junior. In 1911, she invented the la valse renversante dance (topsy-turvey waltz) and chose the charming Chevalier as her partner. Mistinguett once said that her lovers 'had very little meaning' outside of the limelight, but she truly loved Chevalier.

When Chevalier was being held as a prisoner of war by the Germans in 1916, she traveled to Geneva to free him. On the way she was stopped by the French and accused of being Mata Hari; she was only allowed to continue on her journey once the real Mata Hari was found and executed. Once in Geneva, she even agreed to be a spy for the Germans in an attempt to free Chevalier, although she already made a deal with her home country to act as a double spy. Granted freedom of movement by the Central Powers, she would socialize with Prince Gottfried of Austria-Hungry, King Victor Emmanuel of Italy, and King Alfonso XIII of Spain, all the while sending information back to France. In fact, King Alfonso would help Mistinguett smuggle Chevalier back to Paris by forging documents claiming he was an ambulance worker. Unfortunately, this espionage work would eventually backfire horribly, and Mistinguett would be found out by the Germans and sentenced to death. Her life would be saved and her freedom granted in exchange for German wives and daughters held in France.

Mistinguett was heartbroken when Chevalier left her for the younger Léonie Bathiat in 1918. She would maintain he was her favorite lover until the end of her life. It is claimed that she and Chevalier informed the police in 1940 that singer-songwriter Charles Trenet was gay and consorting with youths.

== Death ==
Mistinguett died in Bougival, France, at the age of 82, attended by her son, a doctor. She is buried in the Cimetière Enghien-les-Bains, Île-de-France, France.

Jean Cocteau said in an obituary

Her voice, slightly off-key, was that of the Parisian street hawkers—the husky, trailing voice of the Paris people. She was of the animal race that owes nothing to intellectualism. She incarnated herself. She flattered a French patriotism that was not shameful. It is normal now that she should crumble, like the other caryatids of that great and marvelous epoch that was ours.

== Legacy ==
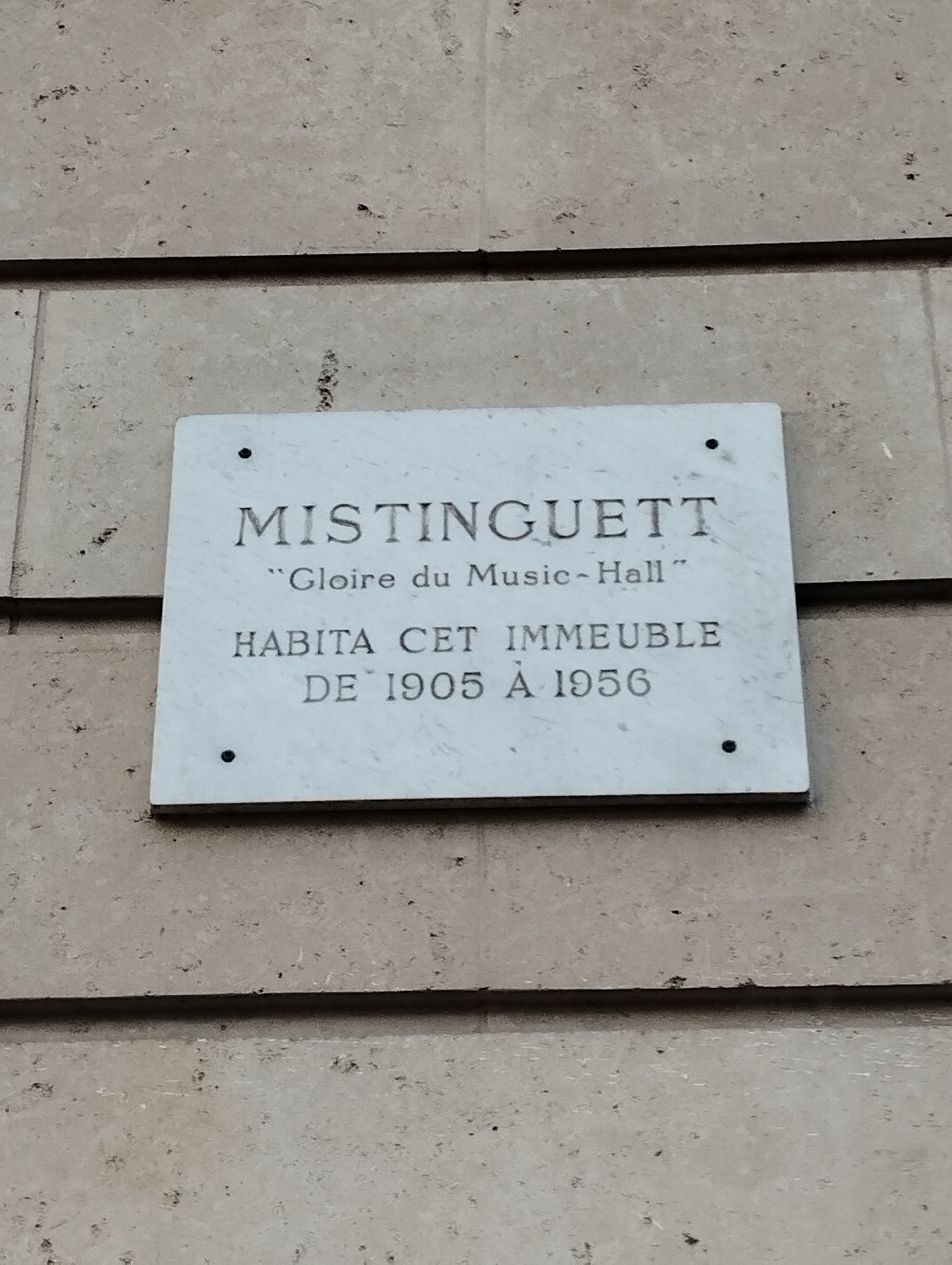
Plaque on Mistinguett's home in Paris

A street is named after her in Montpellier.

There is a Plaque on her home in Paris at 24 Boulevard des Capucines in the 9th arrondissement.

Her hometown of Enghien-les-Bain held a festival in her honor in 2006.

There have been numerous documentaries about her life, such as Mistinguett, la dernière revue, Maurice Chevalier - Mistinguett: Un demi-siècle de chansons, and Leben und Lied der Mistinguett.

A musical about her life was performed at the Théâtre Libre in Paris.

Her songs are still used in media today, such as the use of Il m’a vue nue in the 2007 movie a Môme.

== Gallery ==
Mistinguett poster, 1911

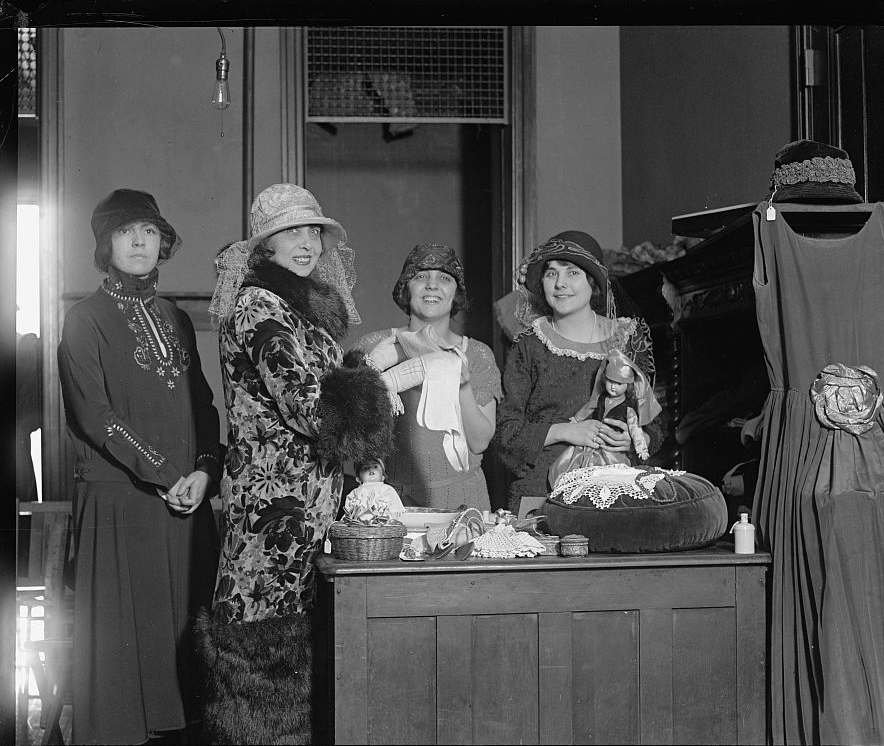
Mistinguett shopping in the United States in 1924

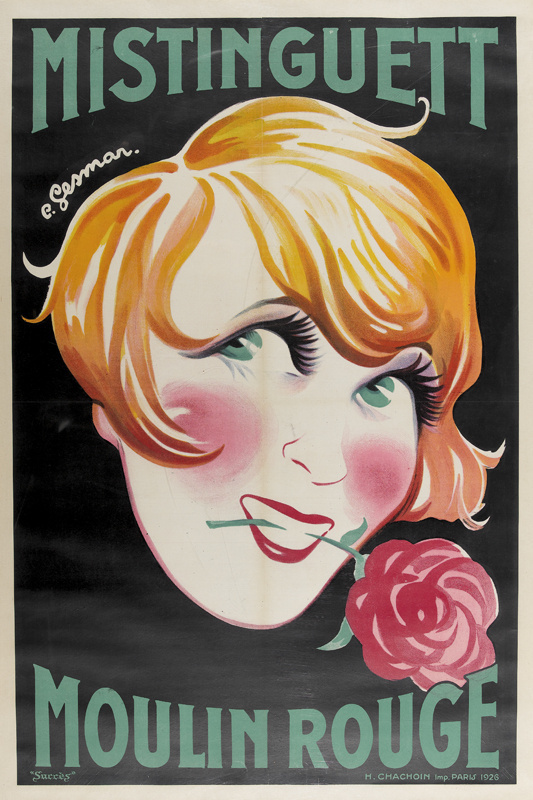
Poster Mistinguett Moulin Rouge, by Charles Gesmar, 1926

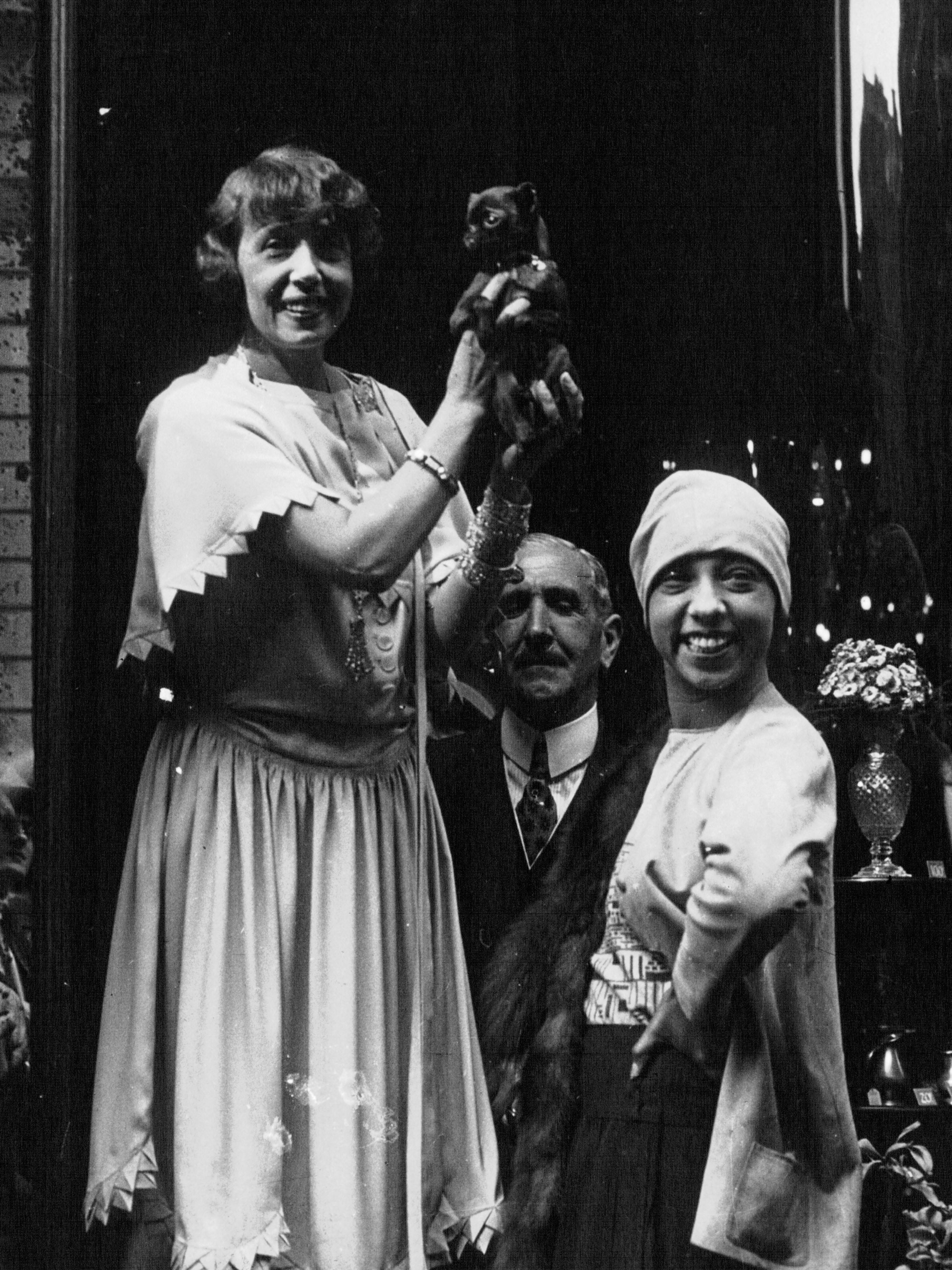
Mistinguett and Josephine Baker in 1927

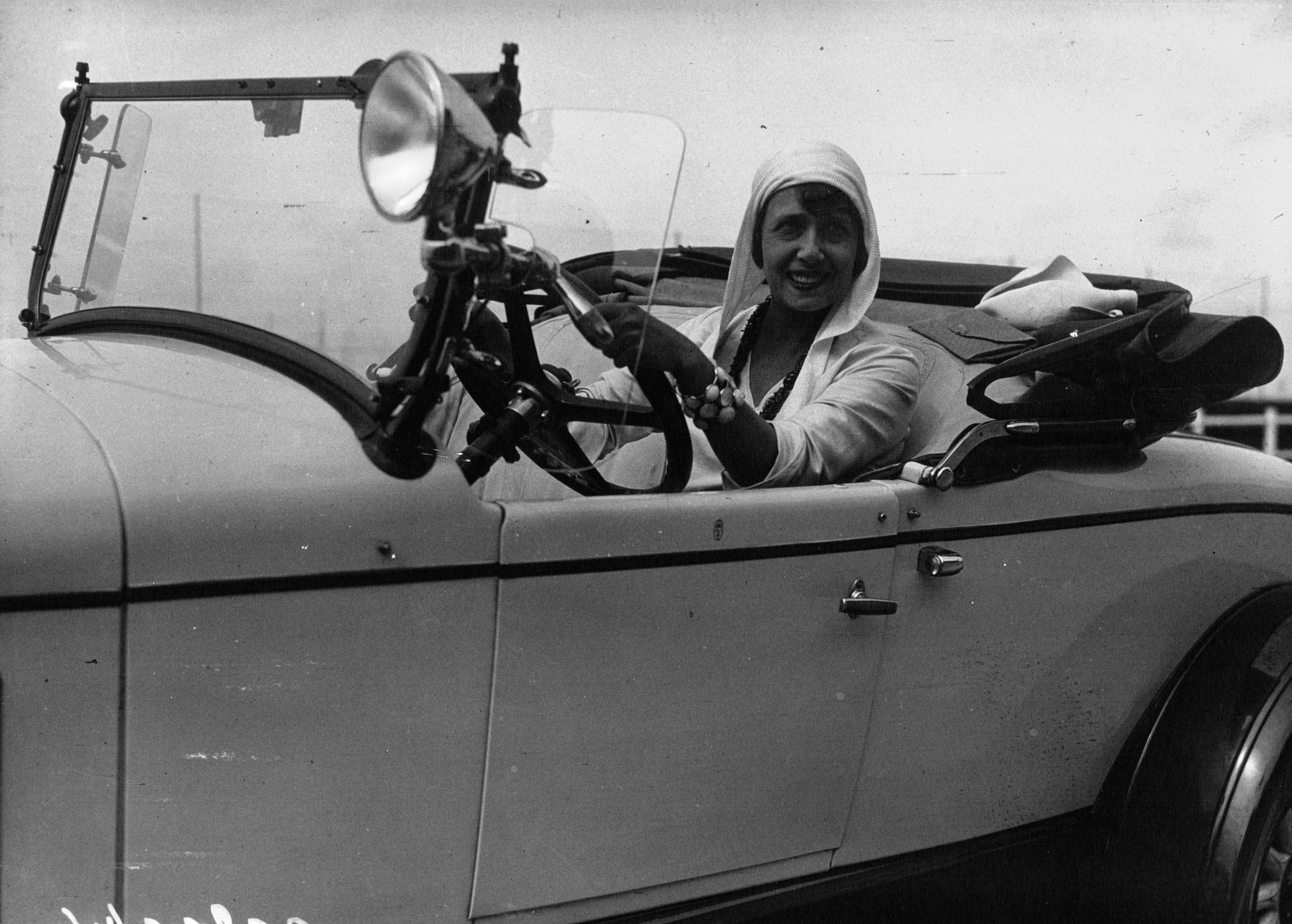
Mistinguett in her Chrysler, Deauville, France, 1929

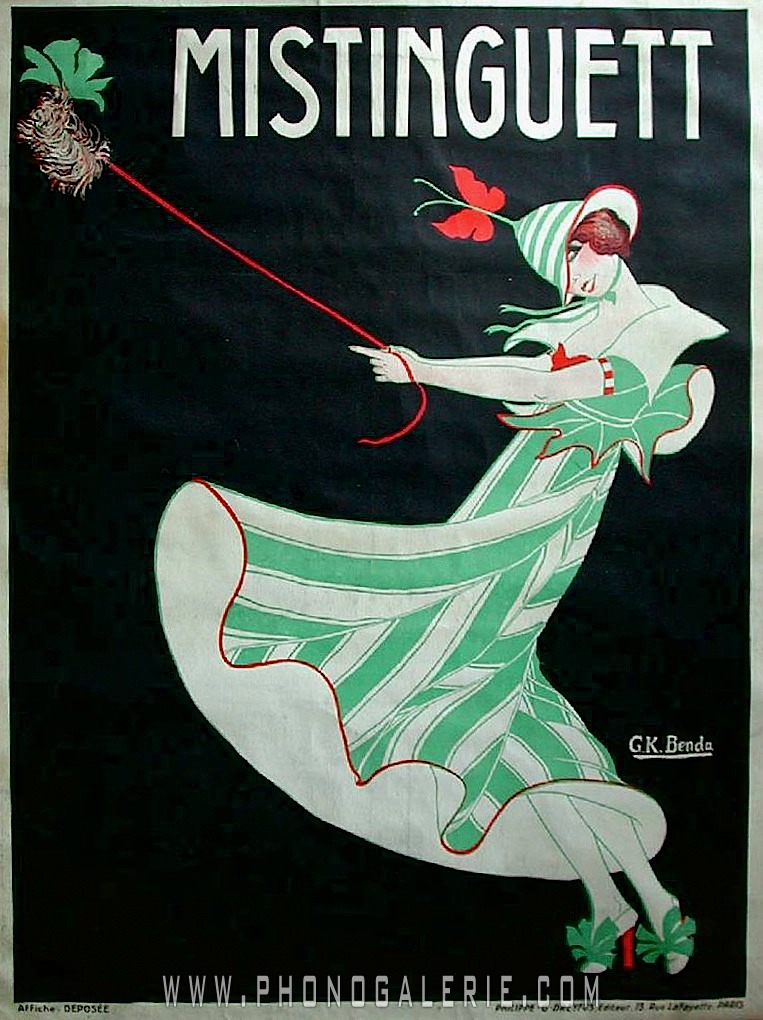

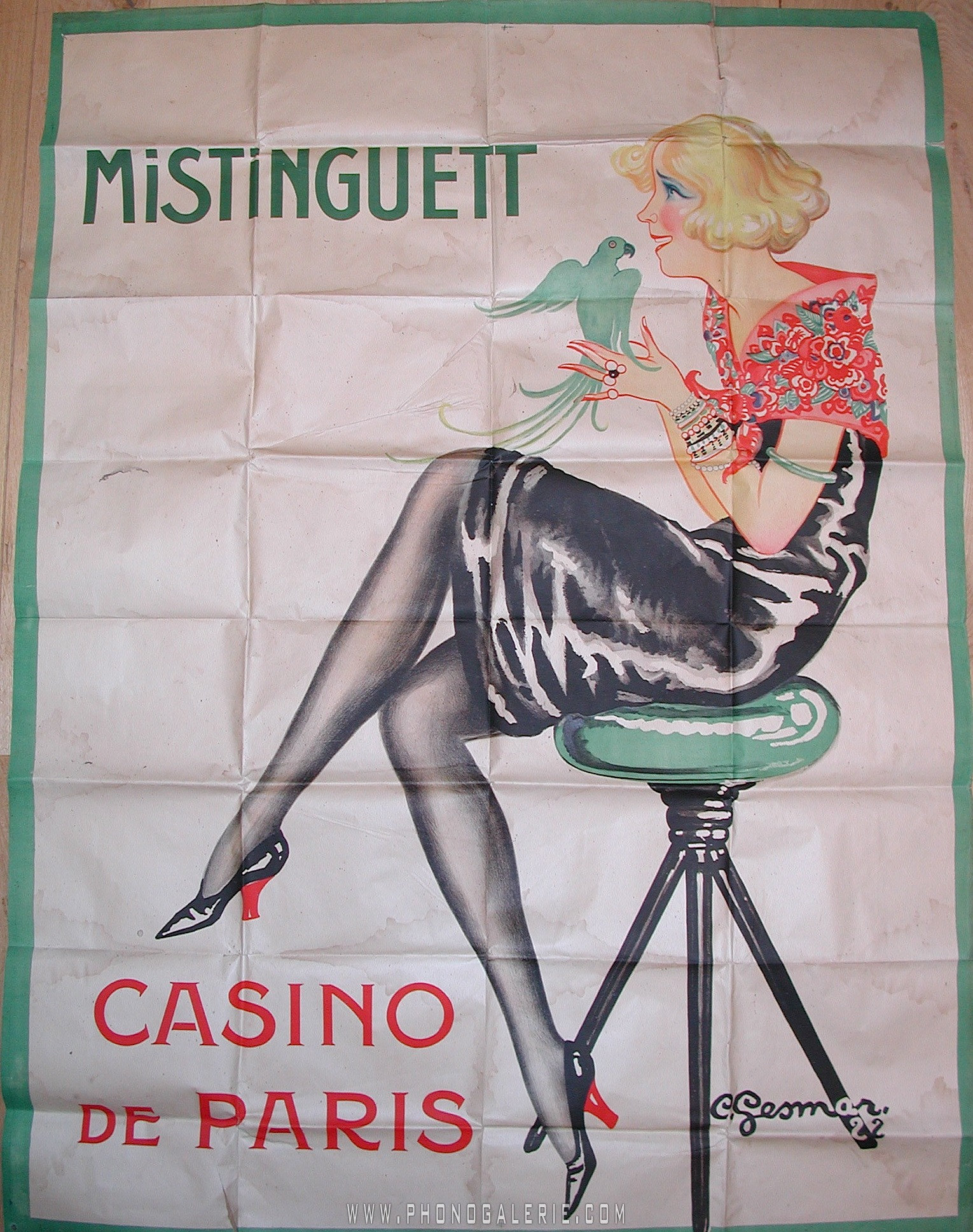

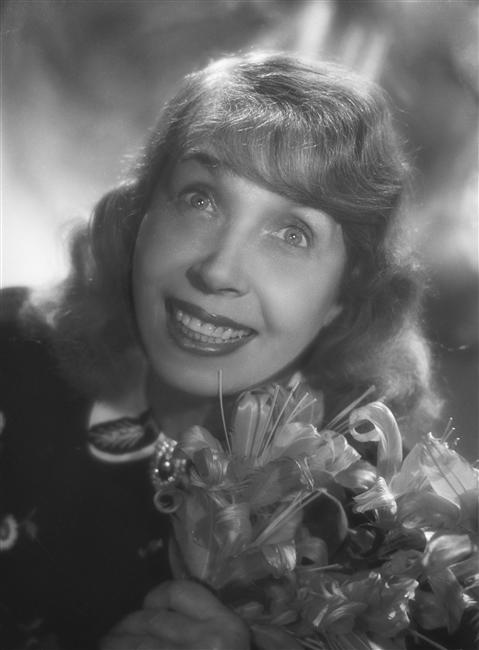
Mistinguett Portrait

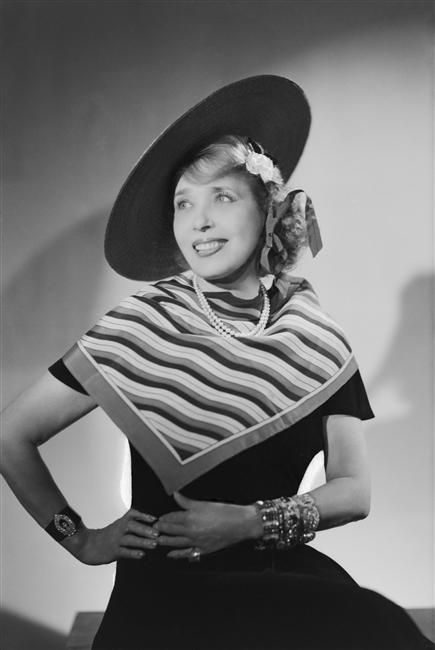

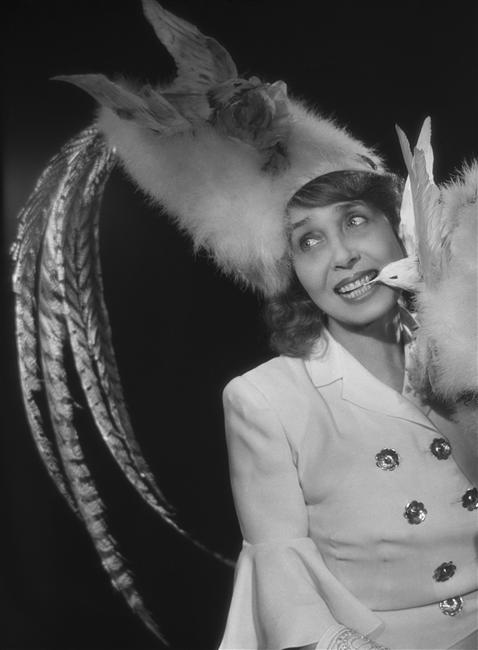

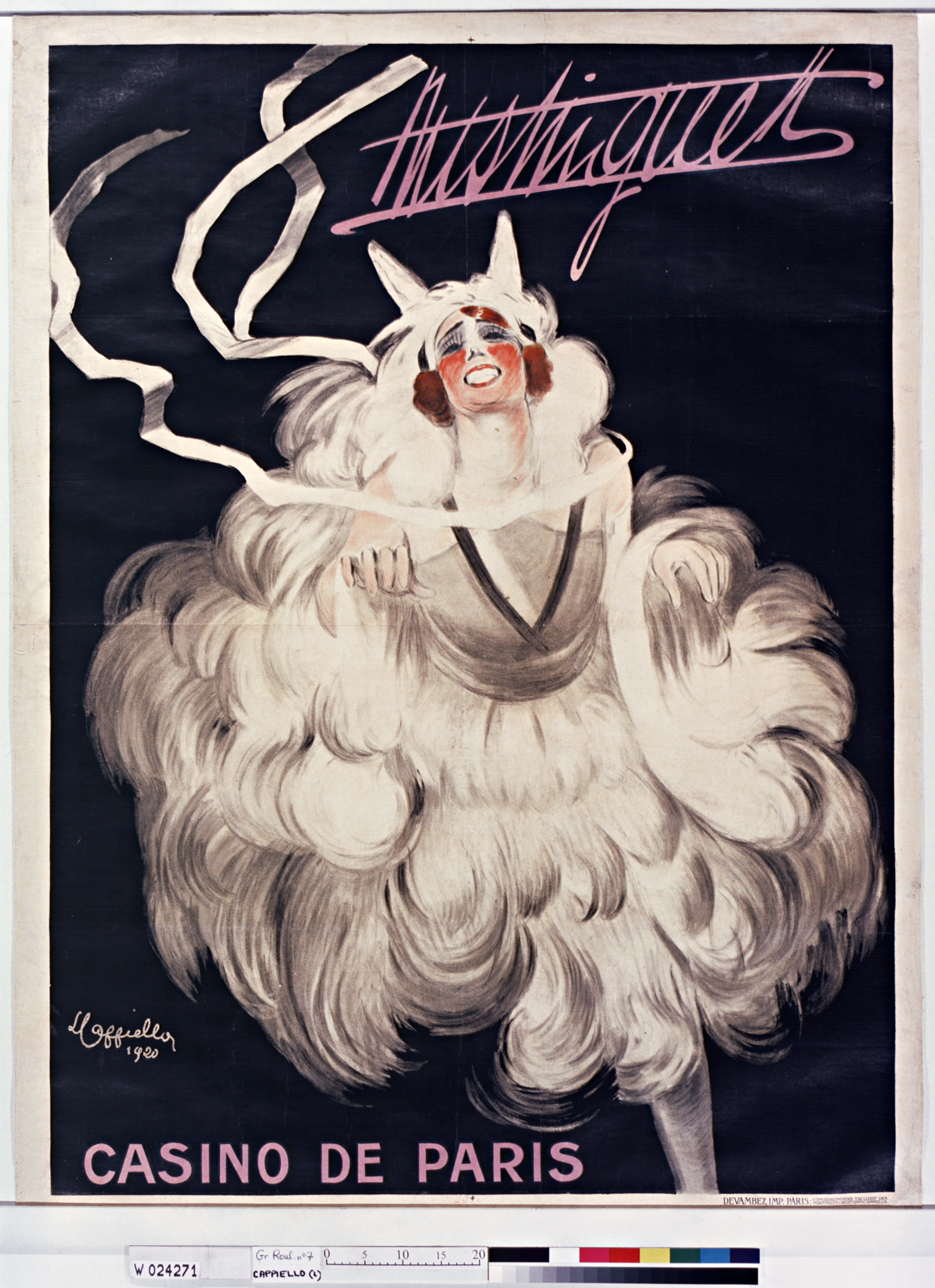

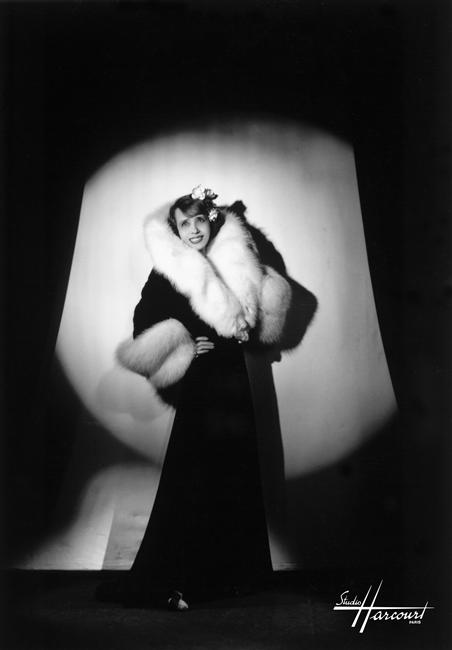
Mistinguett 1939

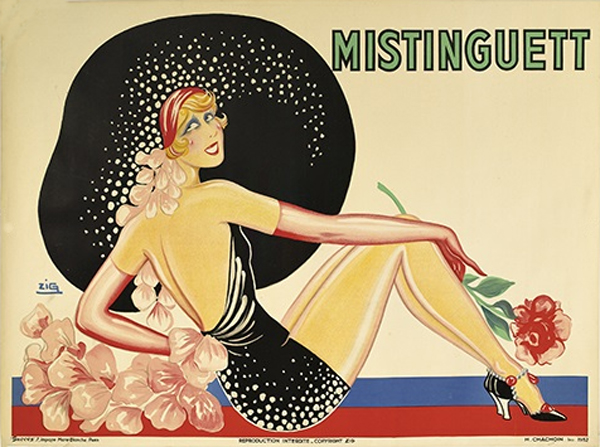
Mistinguett Poster 1932

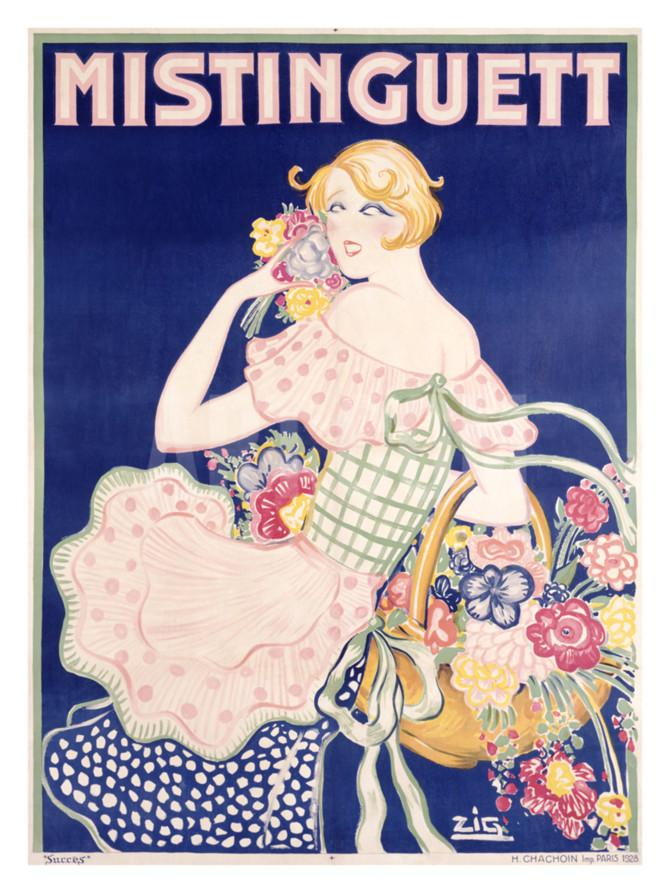
Mistinguett Poster 1928

Mistinguett 1912

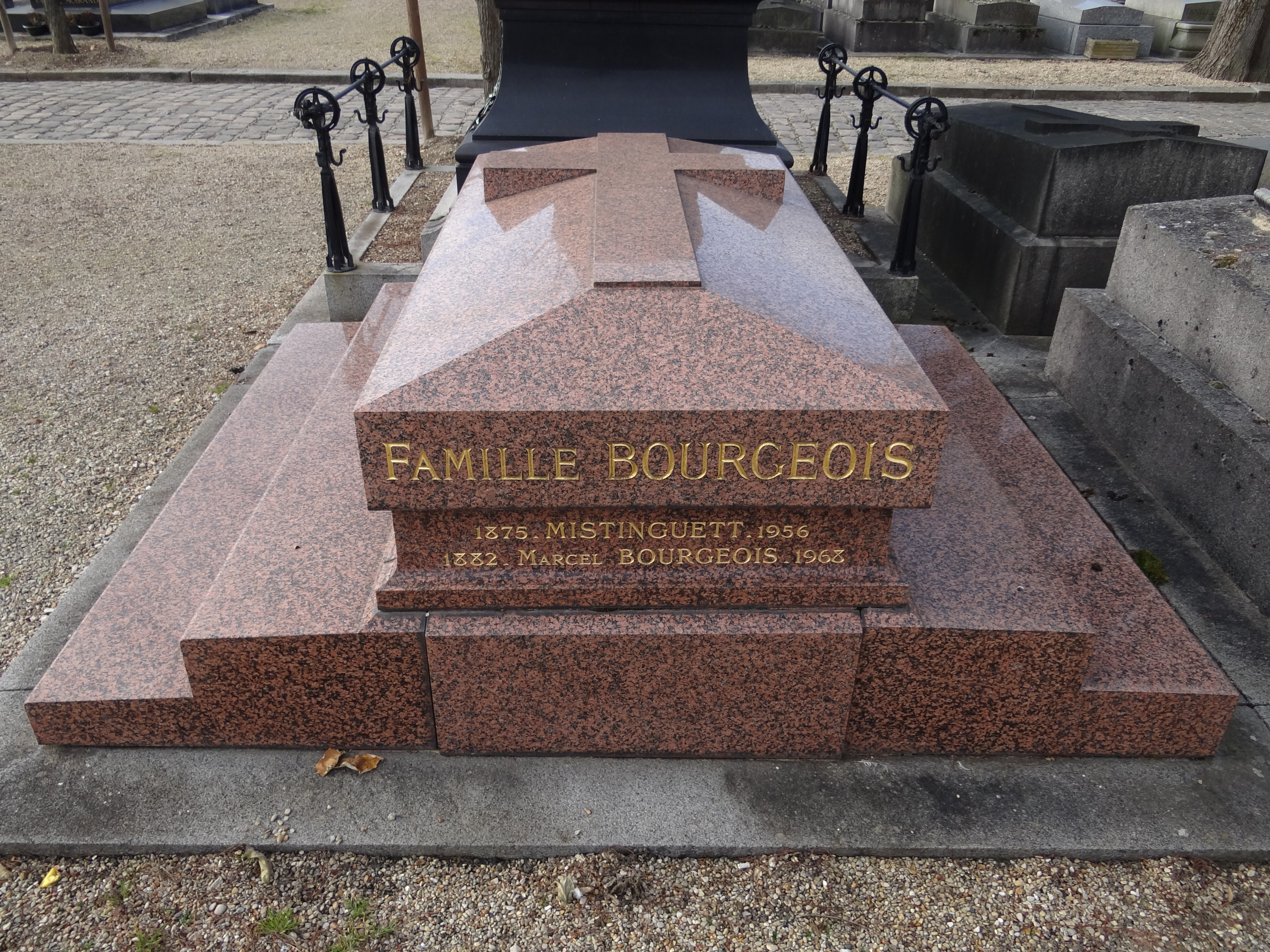
Grave of Mistinguett and her brother Marcel

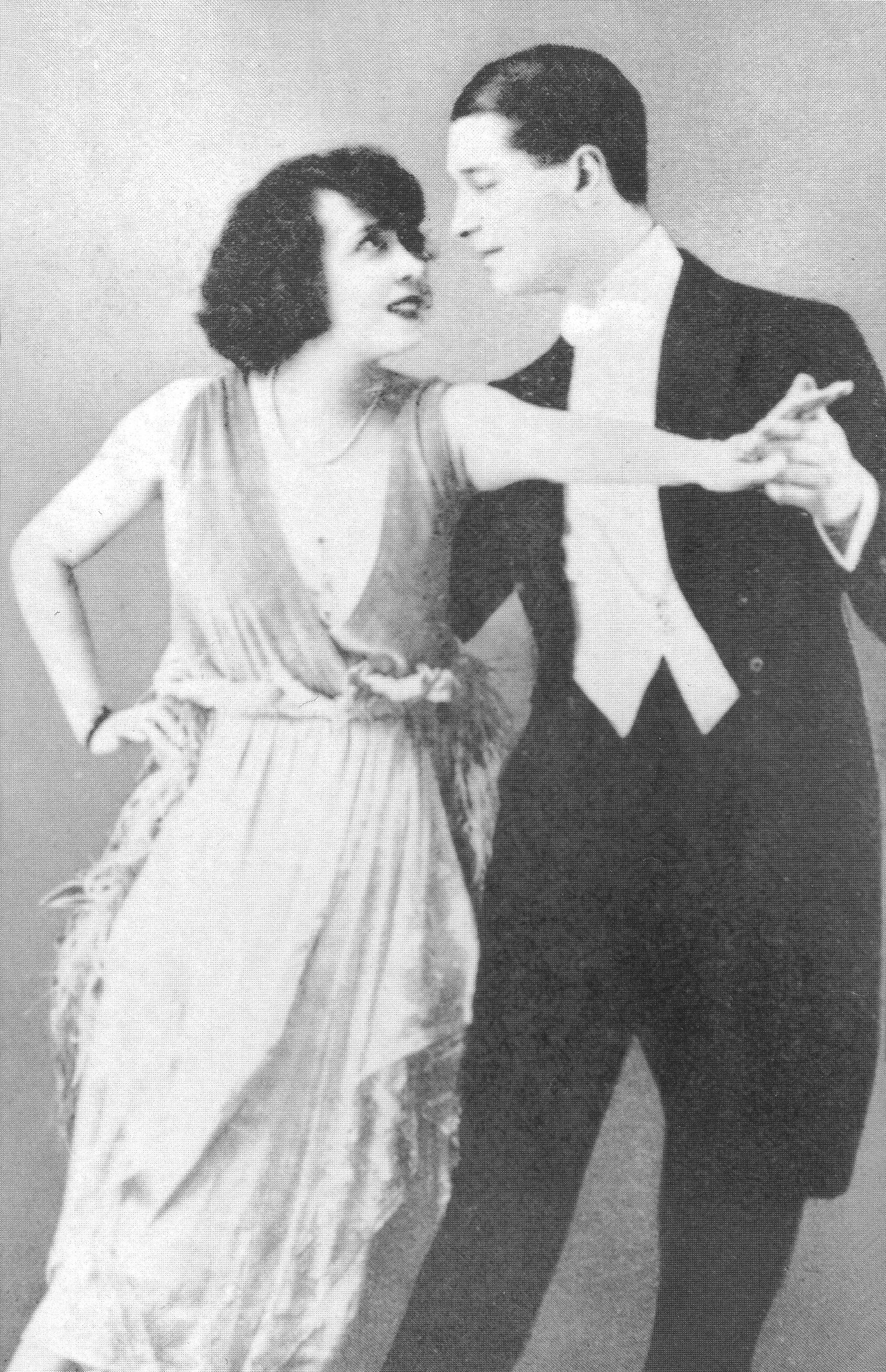
Maurice Chevalier and Mistinguett

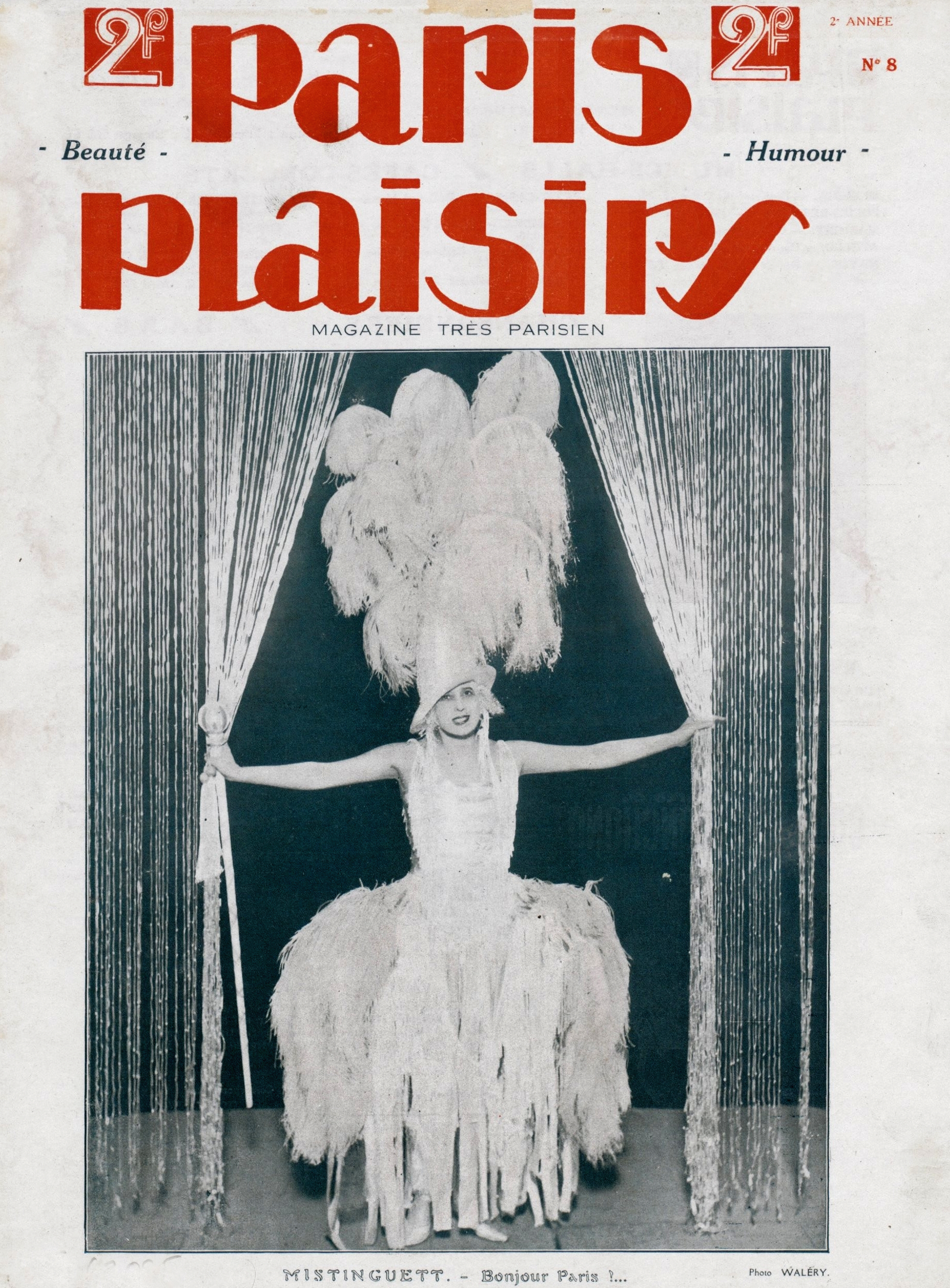
Mistinguett in Paris Poster

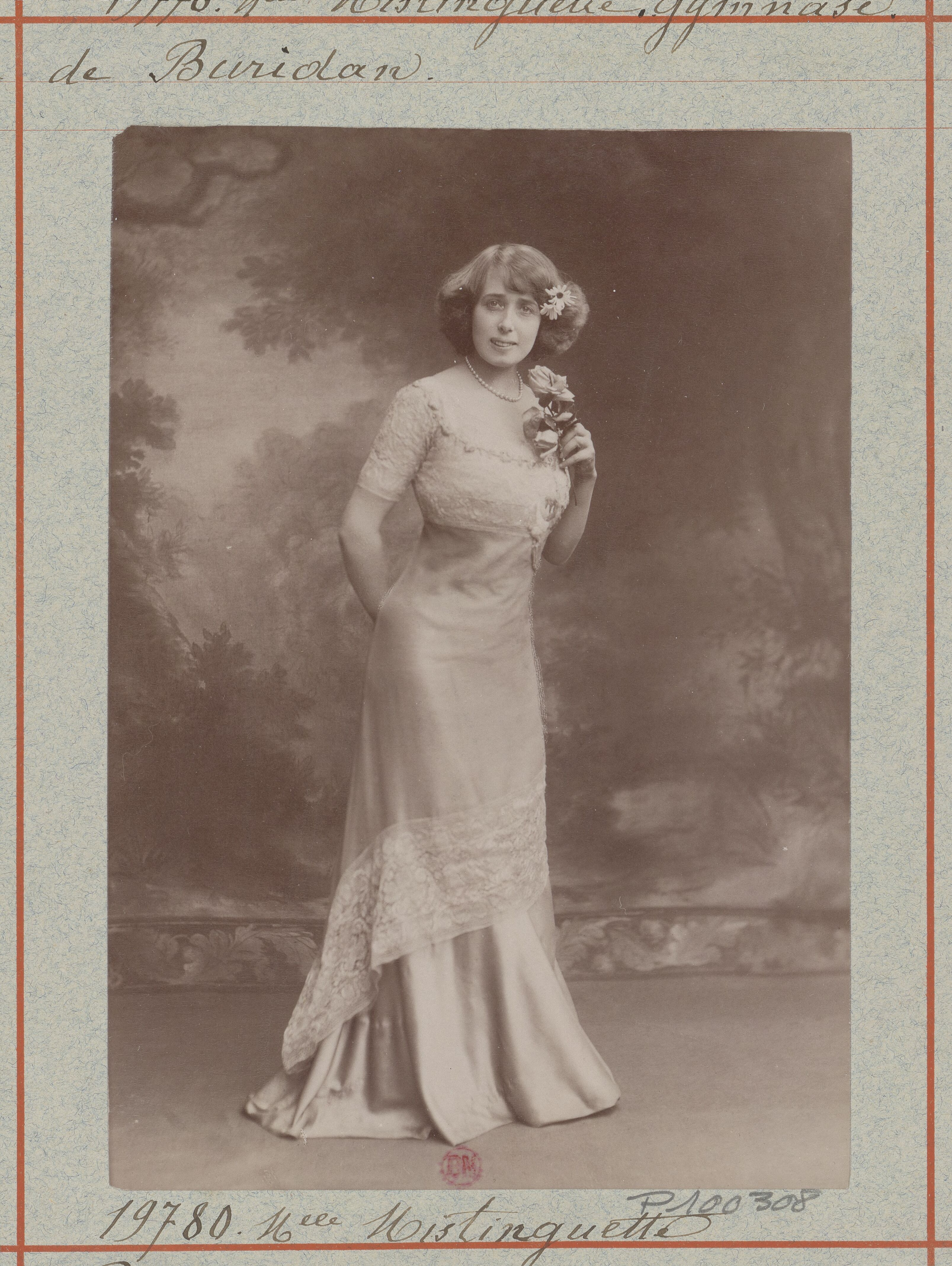
Mistinguett photo

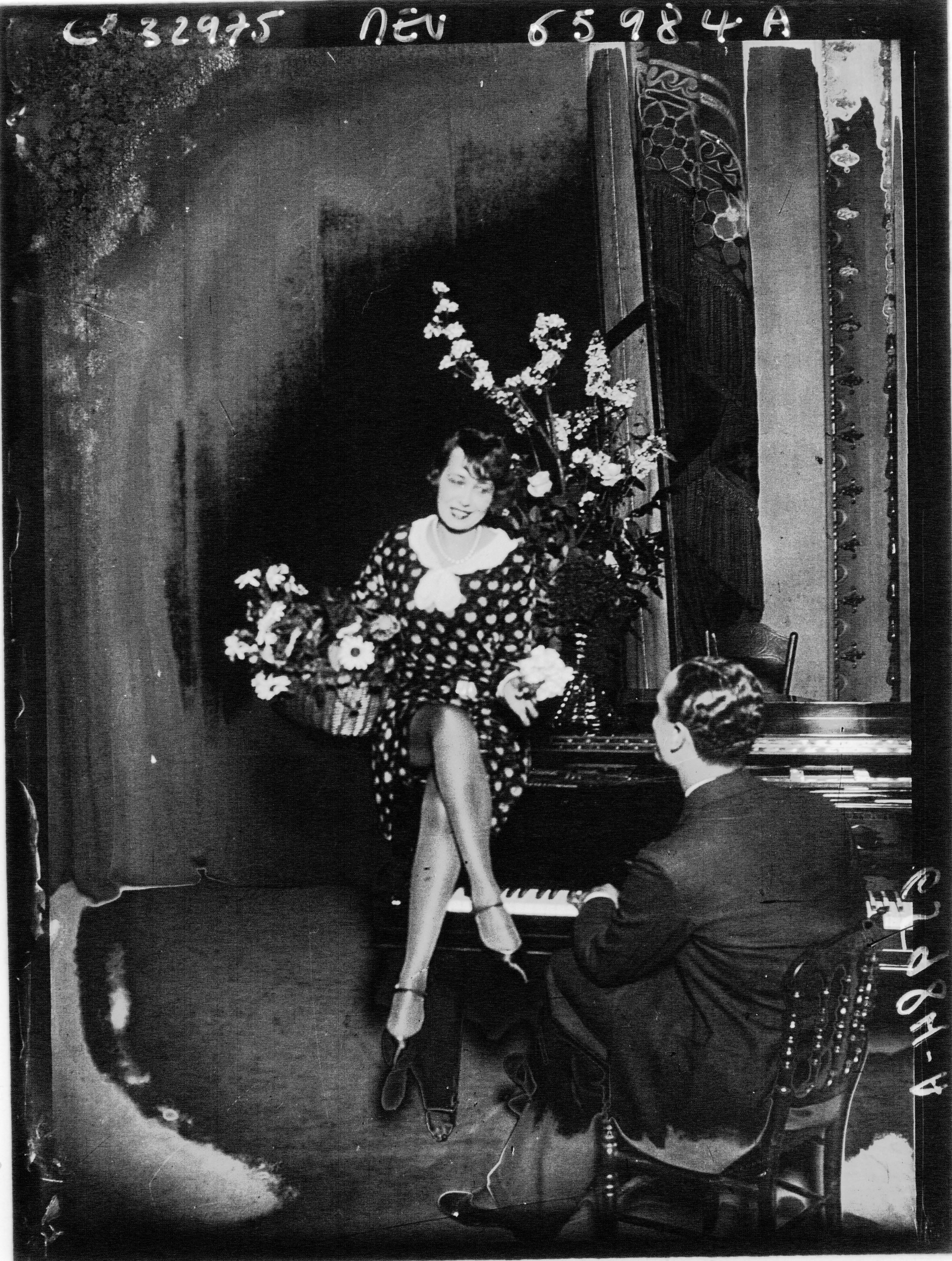

== Filmography ==
- Carosello del varietà (1955)
- Paris 1900 (1947)
- Rigolboche (1936) .... Lina Bourget
- Island of Love (1929)
- Mistinguett détective II (1917)
- Mistinguett détective (1917)
- Flower of Paris (1916) .... Margot Panard et Mistinguett
- Sous la menace (1916)
- The Gold Chignon (1916)
- Doppia ferita, La (1915)
- Valse renversante, La (1914)
- Misérables – Époque 4: Cosette et Marius, Les (1913) .... Éponine
- Misérables – Époque 3: Cosette, Les (1913) .... Éponine
- Misérables – Époque 2: Fantine, Les (1913) .... Éponine Thénardier
- Misérables – Époque 1: Jean Valjean, Les (1913) .... Éponine Thénardier
- Glu, La (1913) .... Fernande, dite 'La Glu'
- Une bougie récalcitrante (1912)
- Parapluie, Le (1912)
- Vocation de Lolo, La (1912)
- À bas les hommes (1912)
- Bal costumé (1912)
- Coup de foudre, Le (1912)
- Folle de Penmarch, La (1912) .... Yvonne ... aka Folle de Pen-March, La (France)
- Moche, La (1912)
- L'Oubliée, L (1912)
- Un enfant terrible (1912)
- Clown et le pacha, Le (1911)
- Épouvante, L' (1911) .... La star de music-hall ... aka Terror-Stricken (UK)
- Ruse de Miss Plumcake, La (1911) .... Miss Plumcake
- Timidités de Rigadin, Les (1910) .... La fiancée de Rigadin
- Ce bon docteur (1909)
- L'Enlèvement de Mademoiselle Biffin (1909)
- Un mari qui l'échappe belle (1909)
- Fiancée récalcitrante, La (1909)
- Fleur de pavé (1909)
- L'Empreinte ou La main rouge (1908)
