= The Little King (film) =

- Directed by: Julien Duvivier
- Written by: André Lichtenberger (novel); Julien Duvivier
- Produced by: Charles Delac; Marcel Vandal
- Starring: Robert Lynen; Arlette Marchal; Béatrice Bretty
- Cinematography: Joseph Barth; Armand Thirard
- Edited by: Marthe Poncin
- Music by: Tibor Harsanyi
- Production companies: Pathé Consortium Cinéma; Société Générale de Cinématographie
- Distributed by: Pathé Consortium Cinéma
- Release date: 21 November 1933
- Country: France
- Language: French

The Little King (French: Le petit roi) is a 1933 French drama film directed by Julien Duvivier and starring Robert Lynen, Arlette Marchal and Béatrice Bretty.

The film's sets were designed by the art director Lucien Aguettand. It was shot at the Joinville Studios in Paris with location filming in various places, including the resort town of Saint-Tropez.

It was made as a follow-up to Duvivier's 1932 hit The Red Head, which also starred Robert Lynen in the title role.

== Synopsis ==
A boy inherits the throne of a fictional European country. The young Michel VIII is surrounded by untrustworthy advisors and threatened by revolutionaries. He goes to the French Riviera to recover his health, but then returns to his homeland.

== Cast ==
- Robert Lynen as Michel VIII
- Arlette Marchal as La comtesse Slasko
- Béatrice Bretty as Barbara
- Jean Toulout as Le comte Marski
- Marcel Vallée as Storeck
- Georgé as Le chambellan
- Hubert Prélier as Pierre Zoltyk
- Paule Andral as La régente
- Julien Clément as Le professeur Bonnard
- Camille Bert as Le professeur d'histoire
- Robert Le Vigan as Le fou
- Charles Camus as Le docteur Jacklow
- Jeanne Méa as Madame de Stenne
- Marcel Carpentier as Le régent Paul
- Louis Vasseur as Le colonel Kremof
- Maurice Schutz as Métropolitain
- Patricia Windrow as Lillie

== Bibliography ==
- McCann, Ben. Julien Duvivier. Oxford University Press, 2017.
