= The Little Thing (1938 film) =

- Directed by: Maurice Cloche
- Written by: Alphonse Daudet (novel); Robert Destez
- Starring: Robert Lynen; Arletty; Marcelle Barry
- Cinematography: Roger Hubert
- Edited by: Kyra Bijou
- Music by: Germaine Tailleferre
- Production company: Compagnie Industrielle et Commerciale Cinématographique
- Release date: 1 June 1938
- Running time: 85 minutes
- Country: France
- Language: French

The Little Thing (French: Le petit chose) is a 1938 French drama film directed by Maurice Cloche and starring Robert Lynen, Arletty and Marcelle Barry. It is based on Alphonse Daudet's 1868 novel Le Petit Chose.

== Cast ==
- Robert Lynen as Daniel Eyssette
- Arletty as Irma Borel
- Marcelle Barry as Mme Eyssette
- Raymonde Cazaux as Les 'Yeux noirs'
- Janine Darcey as Camille
- Fignolita as Coucou Blanc
- Gabrielle Fontan as Mme Lalouette
- Claire Gérard as La veuve Tribou
- Marcelle Hainia as Mme Fougeroux
- Marianne Oswald as La camarade
- Fernand Charpin as M. Pierrotte
- Ida Presti as La guitariste
- Aimé Clariond as M. Eyssette
- Prevot as La concierge
- Édouard Delmont as L'abbe Germane
- Vyola Vareyn as La fée aux lunettes
- Arthur Devère as Barbette
- Guy Favières as Lalouette
- Adrien Lamy as Le marquis
- Charles Lemontier as Le commis
- Robert Le Vigan as Roger
- Georges Mauloy as Le principal
- Jean Mercanton as Jacques Eyssette
- André Numès Fils as Le sous-préfet
- Jean Tissier as M. Viot
- Jean Aymé
- Henri Beaulieu
- Maurice Devienne
- Gil Colas as Le médecin
- Vincent Hyspa as Le photographe
- Léon Larive
- Lecoq
- Paul Marthès as Le portier

== Bibliography ==
- Parish, James Robert. Film Actors Guide. Scarecrow Press, 1977.
