= The Fraudster =

1937 film

- Directed by: Léopold Simons
- Written by: Léopold Simons
- Produced by: Mario Bruitte; Paul Delemar
- Starring: Félicien Tramel; Ginette Leclerc; Robert Lynen
- Cinematography: René Colas
- Edited by: Henriette Pinson; Jean Pouzet
- Music by: Maurice Jeanjean
- Production company: Bruitte et Delemar
- Distributed by: Compagnie Commerciale Française Cinématographique
- Release date: 19 November 1937
- Running time: 101 minutes
- Country: France
- Language: French

The Fraudster (French: Le fraudeur) is a 1937 French crime drama film directed by Léopold Simons and starring Félicien Tramel, Ginette Leclerc and Robert Lynen. The film's sets were designed by the art director Émile Duquesne.

== Synopsis ==
Florimond, a smuggler is having difficulty with a consignment of goods. He gets accomplice and mistress Viviane to seduce Théo a naive peasant boy she encounters in order to rope him into their scheme.

== Cast ==
- Félicien Tramel as Florimond
- Ginette Leclerc as Viviane
- Léopold Simons as Alphonse
- Robert Lynen as Théo
- Jacques Varennes as Jacques
- Line Dariel as Zulma
- Palmyre Levasseur as Mélanie
- Danielle Lorek as Julia
- Cardon as Michel
- Daudelin as Prosper

== Bibliography ==
- Bessy, Maurice & Chirat, Raymond. Histoire du cinéma français: encyclopédie des films, Volume 2. Pygmalion, 1986.
- Crisp, Colin. Genre, Myth and Convention in the French Cinema, 1929-1939. Indiana University Press, 2002.
- Rège, Philippe. Encyclopedia of French Film Directors, Volume 1. Scarecrow Press, 2009.
