= Louis Vasseur =

French weightlifter

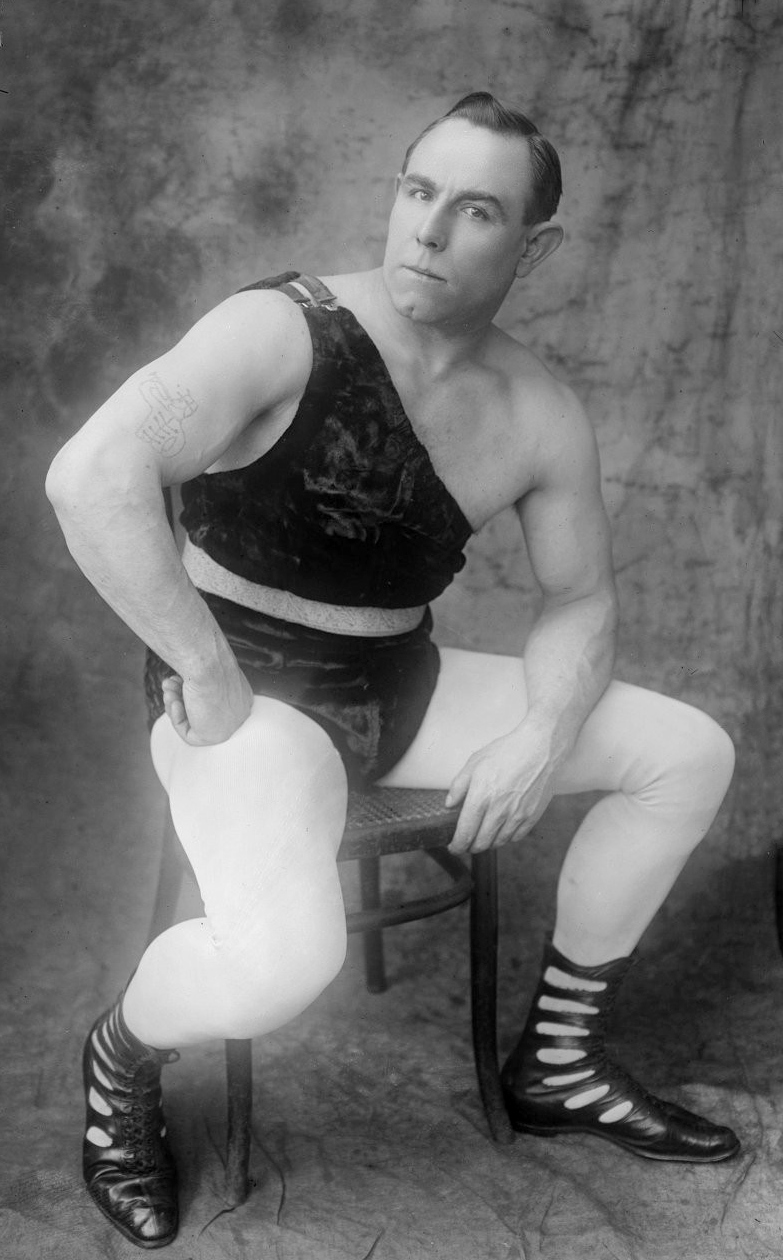
- Louis Vasseur in 1920

Personal information
- Born: 24 January 1885 Roubaix, France
- Died: 11 October 1968 (aged 83) Issy-les-Moulineaux, France

Sport
- Sport: Weightlifting, shot put, discus throw

Achievements and titles
- Personal best(s): SP – 13.40 m (1912); DT – 41.60 (1912)
Medal record
Representing France
Weightlifting
World Championships
Silver medal – second place	1906 Lille	-80 kg

Louis Joseph Vasseur (24 January 1885 – 11 October 1968) was a French weightlifter and athlete who won a silver medal at the 1906 World Weightlifting Championships. He held the national titles in the discus throw (1906) and shot put (1909). His younger brother Alfred competed nationally in the javelin throw.
