= The Red Head (1925 film) =

1925 film

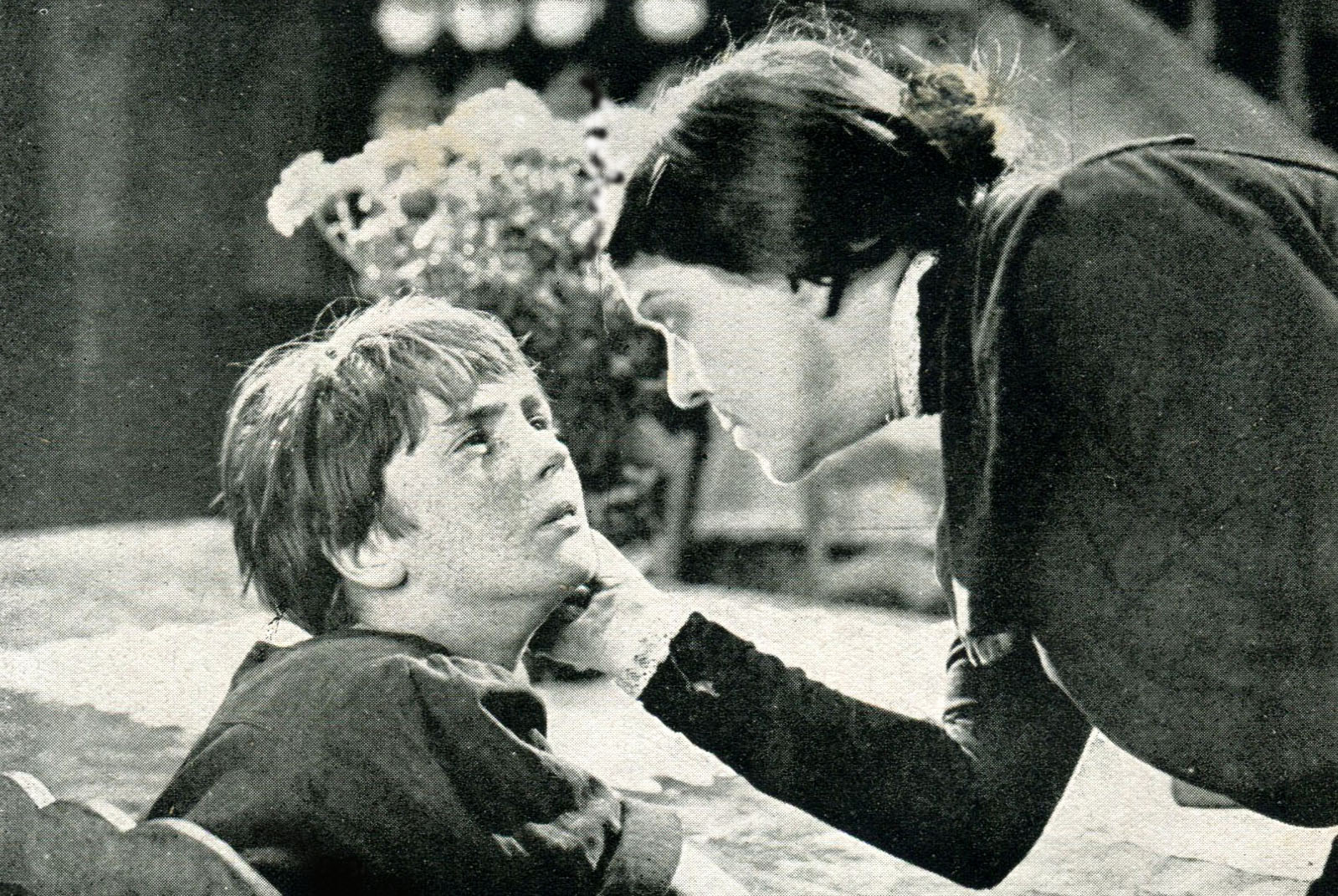
- Directed by: Julien Duvivier
- Written by: Jules Renard (novel); Jacques Feyder; Julien Duvivier
- Starring: Henry Krauss; Charlotte Barbier-Krauss; André Heuzé
- Cinematography: Ganzli Walter; André Dantan
- Production companies: Films A. Legrand; Majestic Films
- Distributed by: Phocea Film
- Release date: 22 December 1925
- Running time: 108 minutes
- Country: France
- Languages: Silent; French intertitles

The Red Head (1925)

The Red Head (French: Poil de carotte) is a 1925 French silent drama film directed by Julien Duvivier and starring Henry Krauss, Charlotte Barbier-Krauss and André Heuzé. Duvivier remade it as a sound film of the same name in 1932.

== Cast ==
- Henry Krauss as Monsieur Lepic
- Charlotte Barbier-Krauss as Madame Lepic
- André Heuzé as François Lepic, dit Poil de carotte
- Fabien Haziza as Felix
- Renée Jean as Ernestine
- Lydia Zaréna as Annette
- Suzanne Talba as Maria
- Yvette Langlais as Mathilde
- Nora Sylvère

== Bibliography ==
- Crisp, Colin. French Cinema—A Critical Filmography: Volume 1, 1929–1939. Indiana University Press, 2015.
