= Anna Thibaud =

French singer

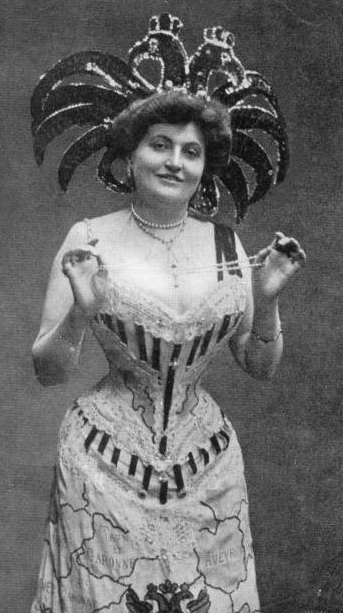
- Born: Marie-Louise Thibaudot; 14 December 1861; Saint-Aubin, Jura, France
- Died: 18 April 1948 (aged 86); Paris, France
- Occupation: Singer

Anna Thibaud (14 December 1861 – 18 April 1948) was a French singer. She had a wide repertoire, attractive stage presence and excellent voice. She performed at important venues in Paris during a lengthy career.

== Life ==
=== Birth ===
There is confusion about her date of birth.

François Thibaudot, shoemaker, married Josephine Breton on November 6, 1850, in Saint-Aubin, Jura. From this wedding was born a first Marie-Louise Thibaudot on December 14, 1861. Josephine Breton died on August 12, 1865, in Saint-Aubin. Widowed, François then married Anne Renaud on 7 November 1866 in the same town. From this marriage was born a second Marie-Louise Thibaudot on July 30, 1867: She married on September 3, 1887, at the town hall of the 7th arrondissement of Paris with a sales representative named Henri Charles Ferdinand Alan, son of Jean Louis Félix dit Auguste Alan, engineer, and Fany Eternod. This couple then settled in Mériel (Val-d'Oise): they were included in the 1906 census of this town where the spouse, named "Anne-Marie", is noted being out of work. She is therefore Anna Thibaud's half-sister because Anna's artistic career began in 1886.

Her actual date of birth is therefore December 14, 1861. This date is confirmed on her death certificate in Paris in 1948 as well as in her file as a Chevalier de la Légion d'Honneur in 1936 where even her baptism, on the following December 25, is specified. Finally, in the same document, a handwritten letter from Anna confirms that she never married.

=== Career ===
She took the stage name Anna Thibaud. She was an attractive stage performer, and had a long career.

She began performing in Metz, then moved to Paris and performed at the Bouffes-Parisiens, at the Eden-Concert and as a diseuse at the Concert Parisien. In the 1880s Mistinguett, the future star of the music halls, visited Anna Thibaud to ask for advice. Thibaud told her, "To succeed in the theatre ... you must be pretty. You must excite men." Mistinguett asked if she meant that she had to excite the crowds. Thibaud repeated, "No, the men!"

In 1886 she sang at the Alcazar d'Eté on the same program as Paulus (Jean-Paulin Habans). In 1890 she appeared at the Scala (Note: She appeared at the Scala in Paris, a café-concert, not the famous opera house in Milan.) where she created her greatest hit, Quand les lilas refleuriront (When the lilacs bloom again), written by Georges Auriol and Désiré Dihau. She sang at the Scala until World War I (1914–18). A drawing by Albert Guillaume (1873–1942) published in Le Courrier français on 15 December 1895 depicted several performers at an unnamed revue at La Scala. It included a drawing of Anna Thibaud as "Le Courrier Français" signed by Adolphe Willette (1857–1926). An 1895 reviewer wrote that Anna Thibaud

is the leading lady exponent of la chansonette among Paris artists at the Café Concert. Of late years there has been a marked return of the semi-sentimental and semi-gouailleur kind of ditty invented by Béranger and his school. Mdlle. Thibaud has made a speciality of the songs of 1830, and sings them in a costume which, while avoiding the grotesque peculiarities of the fashion in vogue when Charles the Tenth was King, is sufficiently rococo to give a touch of local colour to the words which accompany the tunes once so familiar on the left bank of the Seine. ... Mdlle Thibaude possesses to a rare extent l'art de dire, she has a pretty voice, and every word of her song tells. She also takes a special delight in the kind of songs she has made popular, and has taken great pains in each case to discover the original air. In addition to her engagement at La Scala, she is often asked to sing at private parties, where her repertoire is very much appreciated by the hiy lif.

She was very successful until 1914. During World War I, she was involved in the serving of soup kitchens and sang in hospitals in Paris and the surrounding area during the interval between performances she gave to the Armed Forces. She also took care of children and maternity wards in the 4th and 17th arrondissements, even after the war.

Then she continued to sing in the occupied countries (Saarland and Rhineland), at the Invalides and Val-de-Grâce for the incurable, under the presidency of General Mariaud. She was also a professor of French song for 25 years at the Chebroux Foundation (4th arrondissement town hall).

She sang in all charitable and mutual societies without distinction of opinion.

She was a member of the Comité d'Action de l'Ophelinat des Arts (Action Committee of the Orphanage of the Arts), an honorary member of the Société des Artistes Lyriques, an adherent member of the Union des Arts, a member of the Oeuvre des Trente ans de Théâtre, a member of the Chanson de Paris, an honorary member of the Hospitaliers et Sauveteurs de France and a member of the Oeuvre des Colonies Scolaires.

In 1906, she received the Silver Medal of the Mutualité; in 1907, the Medal of Honour of the Encouragement to the Good; in 1919 the Diploma of the French League (17th arrondissement); and in 1920, the Medal of Vermilion of the Encouragement to Progress and the Medal of Honour of the Encouragement to Dedication.

In the early 1930s, Anna Thibaud was still performing at the Palace. In May 1932, describing an evening at the well-known goguette Lice chansonnière, Charles de Bussy wrote "In a halo of glory the beautiful artist Anna Thibaut, queen of the song, happy to have come here tonight, interpreting in her tender and spiritual voice Étoile d'amour, Ce qu'une femme n'oublie pas and Cinq heures du matin. Desaugiers offers to neophytes, with the most exquisite modesty, the salutary example of great art."

Her career lasted 55 years.

=== Distinctions ===
- Officer of the Instruction Publique in 1907
- Officer of the Nichan Iftikhar in 1926
- Chevalier de la Légion d'Honneur in 1936

=== Death ===
Anna Thibaud died in Paris on 18 April 1948.

== Work ==
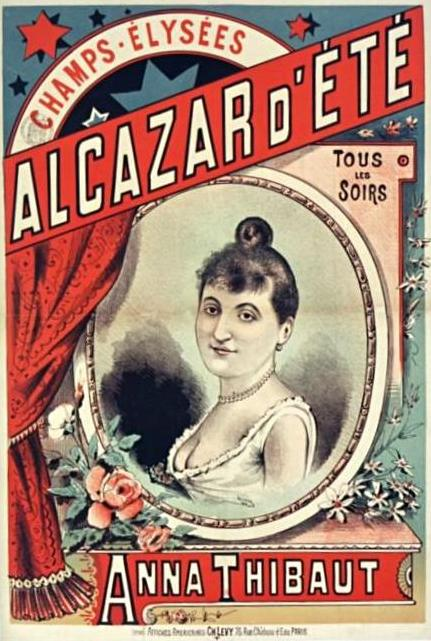
Poster for the Alcazar d'Eté

Anna Thibaud had a varied repertoire, including songs created by Yvette Guilbert, ribald songs and romances. The few recordings that have survived show that she was a fine singer. She was one of the creators of the famous song Quand les lilas refleuriront (1890). She recorded this song in 1899 and again in 1904. Other songs include Rose d'amour (Léon Durocher/Paul Delmet), Vous êtes jolie (Léon Suès/Paul Delmet), Le voyage circulaire (Villemer-Delormel/Emile Bouillon), Si vous la rencontrez (Eugène Riffey/Rémi Aube) and A présent qu't'es vieux (Paul Marinier).

== Publications ==
Music sheets often credited Anna Thibaud as the performer of the works.

- Toquée des militaires: chanson, performed by Anna Thibaud, Paris: Ed. Dax.
- Restons chez nous: romance, performed by Anna Thibaud, lyrics by Félix Mortreuil, illustrated by Henri-Gabriel Ibels, composed by Gaston Maquis, Paris: A la chanson moderne
- Si vous le vouliez, O Mademoiselle: chanson, performed by Anna Thibaud, composed by Gaston Maquis, illustrated by Henri-Gabriel Ibels, lyrics by Gaston Maquis, Eugène Riffey, Paris: A. Fouquet
- L'amoureuse du régiment: chansonnette, performed by Anna Thibaud, lyrics by Lucien Delormel, Villemer, illustrated by Ernest Buval, composed by Lucien Collin, Paris: F. Guillemain, 1888
- Au café du rond-point: chansonnette, performed by Anna Thibaud, composed by Henri Chatau, illustrated by Cândido de Faria, lyrics by Lucien Delormel, Paris: Bassereau, 1888
- L'amoureux de la rue de Ponthieu: chansonnette, performed by Eloi Ouvrard, Anna Thibaud, composed by Eloi Ouvrard, illustrated by Gustave Donjean, lyrics by Eloi Ouvrard, Paris: Emile Benoît, 1892
- L'arrivée du tzar: chansonnette, performed by Félix Mayol, Anna Thibaud, composed by Paul Marinier, lyrics by Paul Marinier, Paris: Georges Ondet, 1901
- Le jeune homme et le trottin (1903): chanson, performed by Anna Thibaud, lyrics by Henri Christiné et Léo Lelièvre, Paris, 1903
- Les leçons de piano ou les joies de la méthode Le Carpentier, performed by Anna Thibaud, lyrics by Lucien Boyer, Paris, 1911

== Sources ==
- "A Singer of Songs of 1830", The Sketch: A Journal of Art and Actuality, Ingram brothers, 1895
- Anna Thibaud (1867?-1948) (in French), BnF: Bibliotheque nationale de France
- Berlanstein, Lenard R. (2009-06-30), Daughters of Eve: A Cultural History of French Theater Women from the Old Regime to the Fin de Siècle, Harvard University Press, ISBN 978-0-674-02081-8
- Brooker, Peter; Thacker, Andrew (2013), The Oxford Critical and Cultural History of Modernist Magazines: Europe 1880 - 1940, Oxford University Press, ISBN 978-0-19-965958-6
- Bussy, Charles de (1932-05-29), "Les goguettes de la lice", Les Dimanches de la Femme: Supplément de la Mode du Jour (in French), Paris
- Dubé, Paul; Marchioro, Jacques (eds.), Anna Thibaud (in French)
- Thibaud, Anna (in French), Centre National du Patrimoine de la Chanson, des Variétés et des Musiques Actuelles, 23 May 2012
