= Sarrogna =

- Commune
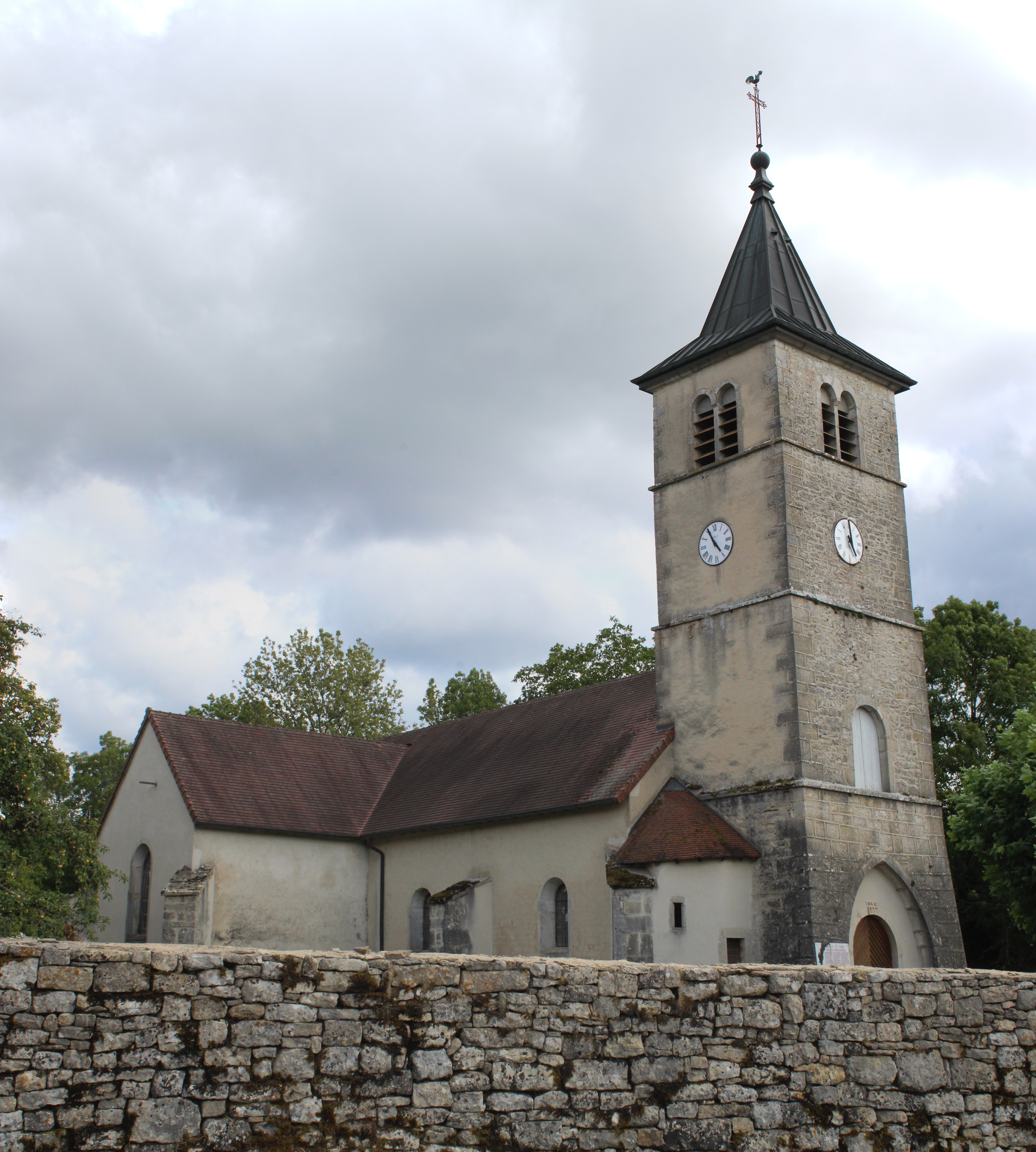
- The church in Sarrogna
- Location of Sarrogna
- Location within France Location within Bourgogne-Franche-Comté
- Coordinates: 46°28′06″N 5°36′43″E
- Country: France
- Region: Bourgogne-Franche-Comté
- Department: Jura
- Arrondissement: Lons-le-Saunier
- Canton: Moirans-en-Montagne

Government
  - Mayor (2020–2026): Philippe Prost
- Area^{1}: 19.87 km^{2} (7.67 sq mi)
- Highest elevation: 744 m (2,441 ft)
- Lowest elevation: 390 m (1,280 ft)
- Population (2023): 228
  - Density: 11.5/km^{2} (29.7/sq mi)
- Time zone: UTC+01:00 (CET)
  - Summer (DST): UTC+02:00 (CEST)
- INSEE/Postal code: 39504 /39270
- ^{1} French Land Register data, which excludes lakes, ponds, glaciers > 1 km^{2} (0.386 sq mi or 247 acres) and river estuaries.

Sarrogna (French pronunciation: [saʁɔɲa]) is a village and commune in the Jura department in the Bourgogne-Franche-Comté region in eastern France.

== Population ==
Historical population
Year	Pop.	±% p.a.
1968	183	—
1975	153	−2.53%
1982	161	+0.73%
1990	146	−1.22%
1999	183	+2.54%
2007	211	+1.80%
2012	228	+1.56%
2017	230	+0.17%
2023	228	−0.15%
Source: INSEE

== See also ==
- Communes of the Jura department
