= Golgotha (film) =

- Directed by: Julien Duvivier
- Written by: Julien Duvivier
- Starring: Harry Baur; Jean Gabin; Robert Le Vigan; Edwige Feuillère
- Cinematography: Jules Kruger
- Edited by: Marthe Poncin
- Music by: Jacques Ibert
- Release date: 12 April 1935
- Running time: 95 minutes
- Country: France
- Language: French

Golgotha is a 1935 French film about the death of Jesus Christ, released in English-speaking countries as Behold the Man. The film was directed by Julien Duvivier, and stars Harry Baur as Herod, Jean Gabin as Pontius Pilate, and Robert Le Vigan as Jesus of Nazareth.

In 1935, the film opened in France, and in 1937 in the United States and played throughout Europe. However, the British Board of Film Censors "would not allow British eyes to see it."

Le Vigan's performance marks the first direct portrayal of Christ in a sound film. For the most part, Jesus is shown from a respectful distance as was also the case in Ben-Hur, Quo Vadis, or The Robe, but there are also a few closer shots and even close-ups.

The National Board of Review named the film the sixth best foreign film of 1937. The score for the movie was composed by French composer Jacques Ibert.

== Cast ==
- Harry Baur ... Herod Antipas
- Jean Gabin ... Pontius Pilate
- Robert Le Vigan ... Jesus Christ
- Charles Granval ... Caiaphas
- André Bacqué ... Annas (as Andre Bacque)
- Hubert Prélier ... Peter (as Hubert Prelier)
- Lucas Gridoux ... Judas
- Edmond Van Daële ... Gerson (as Van Daele)
- Edwige Feuillère ... Claudia Procula
- Juliette Verneuil... Mary
- Marcel Chabrier ... Joseph of Arimathea (as Chabrier)
- Georges Saillard ... Un Sanhédrite (as Saillard)
- Marcel Carpentier (actor) ... Le scribe
- Victor Vina ... Un Sanhédrite
- François Viguier ... Un Sanhédrite (as Viguier)

== See also ==
- List of Easter films
