= Life Dances On =

- Directed by: Julien Duvivier
- Written by: Julien Duvivier; Henri Jeanson; Yves Mirande; Jean Sarment; Pierre Wolff; Bernard Zimmer
- Produced by: Jean-Pierre Frogerais
- Starring: Marie Bell; Françoise Rosay; Louis Jouvet
- Cinematography: Philippe Agostini; Michel Kelber; Pierre Levent
- Edited by: André Versein
- Music by: Maurice Jaubert
- Production company: Productions Sigma
- Distributed by: Les Films Vog
- Release date: 9 September 1937
- Running time: 144 minutes
- Country: France
- Language: French

Life Dances On or Christine or Dance Program (French: Un carnet de bal) is a 1937 French drama film directed by Julien Duvivier and starring Marie Bell, Françoise Rosay and Louis Jouvet. It was partly shot at the Neuilly Studios in Paris. The film's art direction was by Jean Douarinou. Duvivier's American film Lydia (1941) is to some extent a remake of this one.

Outside of the main production, Life Dances On was the first French film dubbed into English by Richard Heinz, thus beginning the industry of English dubbing in France.

== Plot ==
Twenty years after her debut ball when she was sixteen years old, recently widowed Christine is disposing of papers and other effects belonging to her late husband. Living in a mansion on an Italian lake, she has had a comfortable and affluent but unfulfilling life. Coming across her dance card from that debut ball, she gets lost in nostalgic memories of that night, and decides to find out what has happened to the dance partners who signed that card.

Her beaus, living in different locations throughout France, have generally not fared well, with lives that range from the tragic to the comic to the ordinary, often combined in some measure. One killed himself over Christine, and his doting mother haunts his room in a perpetual state of denial. Promising lawyer and poet Pierre became a cynical nightclub owner and mob boss. An older composer took monastic vows and now teaches music to choirboys. The relatively fit and well-adjusted bachelor Eric has secluded himself on a mountain, devoted to his privacy and the town's ski rescue crew. Francois is a petit-bourgeois mayor who is marrying his henpecked maid in a small village and has an adopted son involved in petty crime. A former medical student is a world-weary, drug-addicted wreck performing illegal abortions in the dockyard district. Optimistic card-trick-loving Fabien is a hair-dresser well-contented with his domestic life (perhaps closeted) and frequenting the same old dance circuit in their home town.

When Fabien invites Christine to the town's ball, she accepts, hoping to recapture the magic of the night she remembers, but she is surprised to find that the magical room and dancers of her memory are just ordinary people in a banal setting. She is ruefully amused when a sixteen-year-old girl talks to her about how entrancing the setting and the night seem to her, and she leaves early.

Christine indulges in the melancholy of regret, remaining non-judgmental, but nevertheless disturbed by the profound effect she had on these men, their loss of innocence, and the ravages of time, but she is still curious about Gerard, the one former suitor she has not been able to find. A friend informs her that Gerard has been living just across the lake from her for the last fifteen years. Taking a boat to the other side, Christine encounters a young man, looking much like her memories of Gerard. His father, however, has recently died and the estate is being sold to someone else. In a final scene, the young man, dressed for a formal ball, addresses Christine as his step-mother and they leave together.

== Cast ==
- Harry Baur as Alain Regnault
- Marie Bell as Christine Surgère
- Pierre Blanchar as Thierry Raynal
- Fernandel as Fabien Coutissol
- Louis Jouvet as Pierre Verdier, dit Jo
- Raimu as Francois Patusset
- Françoise Rosay as Marguerite Audié
- Pierre Richard-Willm as Eric Irvin
- Maurice Bénard as Brémond
- Robert Lynen as Jacques Dambreval
- Milly Mathis as Cécile Galtéry
- Sylvie as La maîtresse de Thierry
- Andrex as Paul
- Jeanne Fusier-Gir as La marchande de journaux
- Alfred Adam as Fred
- Pierre Alcover as Teddy Mélanco
- Jacques Beauvais as Le maître d'hôtel
- Peggy Bonny as L'entraîneuse
- Serge de Landauer
- Georges Dorival as Le baron
- Crista Dorra
- Marguerite Ducouret as La mère de la jeune fille au bal
- Agnès Duval as La serveuse du repas de noces
- Gabrielle Fontan as Rose, la bonne de Mme Audié
- Simone Gauthier as La jeune fille au bal
- René Génin as L'adjoint du maire
- Roger Legris as Un complice de Jo
- Raymond Narlay as Un dîneur chez Jo
- Henri Nassiet as Un policier
- Henri Niel as Un invité chez Patusset
- Les Petits Chanteurs à la Croix de Bois as Les petits chanteurs de la manécanterie
- Sylvain as Un danseur
- Janine Zorelli

== Reception ==
Writing for Night and Day in 1937, Graham Greene gave the film a good review, characterizing it as "a film which must be seen [...] [as] it contains the finest French acting". Greene notes that to the extent that "the mood is meant to be autumnal", director Duvivier fails to capture it and whenever the widow appears, "illusion rocks like stage scenery". Despite this, Greene finds that "each episode is beautifully acted and directed", and he concludes that "there has been nothing to equal this episode on the screen since Pépé.

In a short article featuring eleven still photographs from the film, Life magazine declared "With no love interest or spectacle, a middle-aged heroine and an episodic plot, it is the kind of movie which Hollywood never makes. The loss is Hollywood's, for this French picture is one of the year's best in any language."

== Bibliography ==
- Moeller, Felix. The Film Minister: Goebbels and the Cinema in the Third Reich. Axel Menges, 2000.
