= Harry Baur =

French actor (1880–1943)

- Harry Baur as Jules Maigret
- Born: Henri-Marie Baur; 12 April 1880; Montrouge, Hauts-de-Seine, France
- Died: 8 April 1943 (aged 62); Paris, German-occupied France
- Occupation: Actor
- Spouses: Radifé Baher (m. 1936–1943) Rose Cremer (m. 1910–1930)
- Children: 3

Harry Baur (12 April 1880 – 8 April 1943) was a French actor, famous for his titular role in Beethoven's Great Love and as Jean Valjean in the 1934 version of Les Misérables.

== Life ==
Initially a stage actor, Baur appeared in about 80 films between 1909 and 1942. He gave an acclaimed performance as the composer Ludwig van Beethoven in the biopic Beethoven's Great Love (Un grand amour de Beethoven, 1936), directed by Abel Gance, and as Jean Valjean in Raymond Bernard's version of Les Misérables (1934). He also acted in Victorin-Hippolyte Jasset's silent film, Beethoven (1909), and in La voyante (1923), Sarah Bernhardt's last film.

In 1942, while in Berlin, to star in his last film Symphone eines Lebens, Baur's wife, Rika Radifé, was arrested by the Gestapo and charged with espionage. His effort to secure her release led to his own arrest and torture. He was being falsely labelled as a Jew but confirmed freemason. He was released in April 1943, but died in Paris shortly after in mysterious circumstances.

== Legacy ==
American actor Rod Steiger cited Baur as one of his favorite actors who had exerted a major influence on his craft and career.

== Filmography ==
- Monsieur Lecoq (1914)
- Strass et Compagnie (1915)
- The Gold Chignon (1916) as Comte Hector de Nages, a.k.a. Bébert
- Flower of Paris (1916, Short) as Harry Podge
- 48, avenue de l'Opéra (1917) as Tom Baxler
- Sous la griffe (1917)
- L'âme du bonze (1918)
- The Clairvoyant (1924) as Monsieur Detaille
- David Golder (1931) as David Golder
- Le cap perdu (1937) as Le Capitaine Kell
- Moon Over Morocco (1931) as M. de Marouvelle
- The Polish Jew (1931) as Mathias
- The Red Head (1932) as Monsieur Lepic
- The Three Musketeers (1932) as Tréville
- Criminal (1933) as Warden Brady
- The Old Devil (1933) as Guillaume Vautier
- A Man's Neck (1933) as Commissaire Jules Maigret
- Rothchild (1934) as Rothchild
- Les Misérables (1934) as Jean Valjean / Champmathieu
- Le greluchon délicat (1934) as Michel
- A Man of Gold (1934) as Capon
- Moscow Nights (1934) as Piotr Brioukow
- Golgotha (1935) as Hérode
- Crime and Punishment (1935) as Le juge Porphyre
- Dark Eyes (1935) as Ivan Ivanovitch Petroff
- Moscow Nights (1935) as Peter Brioukow
- Le Golem (1936) – L'empereur Rodolphe II as roi de Bohème
- Samson (1936) as Jacques Brachart
- Taras Bulba (1936) as Tarass Boulba
- Beethoven's Great Love (1936) as Ludwig van Beethoven
- Nitchevo (1936) as Le commandant Robert Cartier
- The New Men (1936) as Bourron
- Paris (1937) as Alexandre Lafortune
- Sarati the Terrible (1937) as César Sarati
- The Secrets of the Red Sea (1937) as Saïd Ali
- Life Dances On (1937) as Alain Regnault
- Mollenard (1938) as Captain Mollenard
- Rasputin (1938) as Raspoutine (Rasputin)
- The Postmaster's Daughter (1938) as Virine, le maitre de poste
- The Patriot (1938) as Le tsar Paul 1er
- The Rebel Son (1938) as Taras Bulba
- The Man from Niger (1940) as Le docteur Bourdet
- President Haudecoeur (1940) as Le président Haudecoeur
- Volpone (1941) as Volpone
- Who Killed Santa Claus? (1941) as Gaspard Cornusse
- Sins of Youth (1941) as Monsieur Lacalade
- Symphonie eines Lebens (1943) as Stephan Melchior (final film role)
