= The Man of the Hour =

1937 French musical film

- Maurice Chevalier and Elvire Popesco
- Directed by: Julien Duvivier
- Written by: Julien Duvivier; Charles Spaak; Charles Vildrac
- Produced by: Julien Duvivier; José Marquis
- Starring: Maurice Chevalier; Elvire Popesco; Josette Day; André Alerme
- Cinematography: Roger Hubert
- Edited by: Marthe Poncin
- Music by: Jean Wiener
- Production company: Les Films Marquis
- Distributed by: Distribution Parisienne de Films
- Release date: 26 February 1937
- Running time: 93 minutes
- Country: France
- Language: French

The Man of the Hour (French: L'homme du jour) is a 1937 French musical film directed by Julien Duvivier and starring Maurice Chevalier, Elvire Popesco and Josette Day. The film was shot at the Joinville Studios, with sets designed by the art director Jacques Krauss.

== Synopsis ==
An ordinary man saves the life of a great actress by giving blood, and she in turns decides to promote him as a singing star.

== Partial cast ==
- Maurice Chevalier as Alfred Boulard / Himself
- Elvire Popesco as Mona Thalia
- Josette Day as Suzanne Petit
- Raymond Aimos as Le vieux cabot
- André Alerme as François-Théophile Cormier de la Creuse
- Marguerite Deval as Mme Christoforo
- Marcelle Géniat as Alphonsine Boulard - la mère d'Alfred
- Paulette Élambert as La petite soeur de Suzanne
- Robert Lynen as Milot - l'apprenti électricien
- Marcelle Praince as Mme Pinchon - une pensionnaire
- Robert Pizani as Le poète efféminé
- Pierre Sergeol as La Breloque
- Charlotte Barbier-Krauss as Mme Legal - la patronne de la pension de famille
- Simone Deguyse as La petite femme à la terrasse du café
- Renée Devillers as Fanny Couvrain - la fille aux fleurs
- Fernand Fabre as Le peintre à la réception
- Jeanne Fusier-Gir as La chanteuse à l'audition
- Germaine Michel as La bouchère
- Missia as La dame du monde à la réception

== Bibliography ==
- Lucy Mazdon & Catherine Wheatley. Je T Aime... Moi Non Plus: Franco-British Cinematic Relations. Berghahn Books, 2010.
