= They Were Five =

1936 film

La Belle Équipe
- Film poster
- Directed by: Julien Duvivier
- Written by: Julien Duvivier; Charles Spaak
- Produced by: Arys Nissotti
- Starring: Jean Gabin; Charles Vanel; Raymond Aimos; Viviane Romance
- Cinematography: Marc Fossard; Jules Kruger
- Edited by: Marthe Poncin
- Music by: Maurice Yvain
- Production company: Ciné-Arys
- Distributed by: Societe d'Edition et de Location de Films
- Release date: 15 September 1936
- Running time: 101 minutes
- Country: France
- Language: French

They Were Five (French: La Belle Équipe) is a 1936 French drama film directed by Julien Duvivier and starring Jean Gabin, Charles Vanel, and Viviane Romance. It tells the story of five unemployed workers who win the jackpot in the national lottery but their solidarity then proves fragile.

== Plot ==
Five unemployed men in Paris are friends. Jeannot, Jacques, and Tintin are bachelors. Charlot (though the rest do not know) has left his faithless wife Gina, while Mario is an illegal immigrant from Spain who has got engaged to Huguette. Suddenly their lives are transformed when their syndicate wins the jackpot in the national lottery.

After much discussion, which Jeannot tends to lead, they agree to pool the money. Rowing up the river Marne, they see a ruined laundry and agree to convert it themselves into a guinguette, a riverside restaurant and dance hall. Living on site and working all day, there is much bonding between the five but fissures also appear.

Tintin plays the fool while on the roof and falls fatally. Jacques disappears with his share of the money. Mario gets notice of expulsion and hastily marries Huguette before complying. This leaves Jeannot and Charlot, who proceed to fall out over Gina, still legally married to Charlot, who not only wants to get her hands on Charlot's share of the winnings but easily seduces the willing Jeannot.

In the original pessimistic ending, Jeannot's jealousy leads him to shoot Charlot dead, while in the re-shot optimistic ending the two men unite as friends against the woman's wiles.

== Selected cast ==
- Jean Gabin as Jeannot
- Charles Vanel as Charlot
- Raymond Aimos as Tintin
- Charles Dorat as Jacques
- Raphaël Médina as Mario
- Micheline Cheirel as Huguette, Mario's fiancée
- Viviane Romance as Gina, the wife of Charles
- Marcelle Géniat as Huguette's grandmother
- Fernand Charpin as policeman Antomarchi
- Raymond Cordy as the drunkard
- Charles Granval as father Guilard

== Production ==
The script was written by Duvivier and Charles Spaak, with Maurice Yvain provided the score. Jean Gabin's song Quand on s'promène au bord de l'eau was written by Duvivier, Yvain and Louis Poterat. Interiors were shot at the Joinville Studios in Joinville-le-Pont, Val-de-Marne, with exteriors at Chennevières-sur-Marne. The film's sets were designed by the art director Jacques Krauss.

== Critical reception ==
Critics have associated the film with the rise and demise of the Popular Front. The film was made in June and July 1936 and coincided with the early days of the Léon Blum government and the strikes for better conditions. Duvivier was certainly not a Leftist. It should be pointed out nonetheless that Duvivier's portrayal of male friendship gradually being eroded by a woman and by desire for that woman was canonical by 1936, so the film does not limit itself to that reading. If the men in Duvivier's film do not get to fulfil their dream of setting up their guinguette it is because, while economically they can be solidaires—as one, sexually they cannot. On a first level of reading, therefore, it is sex before politics that drives the narrative."

== Legacy ==
They Were Five has influenced several Japanese screenwriters. Niisan Takahashi's Gamera vs. Barugon was strongly influenced by the Duvivier's film as it is one of Takahashi's favorite films. Kazuo Kasahara cited They Were Five as one of references for his Battles Without Honor and Humanity series. The 1995 drama series King's Restaurant (jp) by Kōki Mitani was set in a French restaurant La Belle Equipe, and its garde manger is named Gerhard Duvivier.
