= The Red Head (1932 film) =

1932 film

- Directed by: Julien Duvivier
- Written by: Jules Renard (novel); Julien Duvivier
- Starring: Harry Baur; Robert Lynen; Louis Gauthier
- Cinematography: Monniot; Armand Thirard
- Edited by: Marthe Poncin
- Music by: Alexander Tansman
- Production company: Les Films Marcel Vandal et Charles Delac
- Distributed by: Pathé-Natan
- Release date: 4 November 1932
- Running time: 91 minutes
- Country: France
- Language: French

The Red Head (French: Poil de carotte) is a 1932 French drama film directed by Julien Duvivier and starring Harry Baur, Robert Lynen and Louis Gauthier. It is a remake of Duvivier's 1925 silent film The Red Head.

The film's art direction was by Lucien Aguettand and Lucien Carré.

== Cast ==
- Harry Baur as Monsieur Lepic
- Robert Lynen as François Lepic, dit 'Poil de Carotte'
- Louis Gauthier as Le parrain
- Simone Aubry as Ernestine Lepic
- Maxime Fromiot as Félix Lepic
- Colette Segall as La petite Mathilde
- Marthe Marty as Honorine, la vieille bonne
- Christiane Dor as Annette, la bonne
- Catherine Fonteney as Madame Lepic
- Claude Borelli as Un petit garçon à la noce
- Colette Borelli as Une petite fille à la noce
- Jean Borelli as Un petit garçon à la noce

== Bibliography ==
- Crisp, Colin. French Cinema—A Critical Filmography: Volume 1, 1929–1939. Indiana University Press, 2015.
