= Die Privatsekretärin =

Die Privatsekretärin may refer to:

- Die Privatsekretärin (1931 film), a German film
- Die Privatsekretärin (1953 film), a German film

== See also ==
- Sunshine Susie, a 1931 American film
- Dactylo, a French film
- The Private Secretary (1931), an Italian film
