= The Private Secretary =

The Private Secretary may refer to:

- The Private Secretary (play), an 1883 play in three acts by Charles Hawtrey
- The Private Secretary (1931 German film), based on a 1905 novel by István Szomaházy
- The Private Secretary (1931 Italian film), an Italian language version of the German film
- The Private Secretary (1935 film), a British adaptation of the Hawtrey play
- The Private Secretary (1953 film), a West German remake of the 1931 German film

== See also ==
- Private secretary, a civil servant; or a public servant in a royal household
- Private Secretary (TV series), an American sitcom
- Private Secretary (film), a 1952 Mexican romantic drama film
