= The Typist =

1931 film

- Directed by: Wilhelm Thiele
- Written by: Jean Boyer; István Békeffy (operetta); Franz Schulz; István Szomaházy (novel)
- Produced by: Herman Millakowsky; Georg Witt
- Starring: Marie Glory; Jean Murat; Armand Bernard
- Cinematography: Otto Heller; Reimar Kuntze; Adolf Schlasy
- Music by: Lajos Lajtai
- Production companies: Pathé-Natan; Greenbaum-Film
- Distributed by: Pathé-Natan
- Release date: 4 April 1931
- Running time: 77 minutes
- Country: France
- Language: French

The Typist (French: Dactylo) is a 1931 French comedy film directed by Wilhelm Thiele and starring Marie Glory, Jean Murat and Armand Bernard. It was a French-language version of the German film Die Privatsekretärin which was itself based on a novel by István Szomaházy. It was followed by a 1934 sequel The Typist Gets Married.

The film's sets were designed by Otto Hunte and Franz Koehn.

== Cast ==
- Marie Glory - Simone Dupré
- Jean Murat - Paul Derval
- Armand Bernard - Jules Fanfarel
- Marie-Antoinette Buzet - La secrétaire
- Jean Boyer - Moreau
- Albert Broquin - Un choriste
- André Michaud - Le garçon de restaurant

== Other film versions ==
- Tales of the Typewriter (December 1916, Hungary, directed by Alexander Korda)
- The Private Secretary (January 1931, Germany, directed by Wilhelm Thiele)
- The Private Secretary (July 1931, Italy, directed by Goffredo Alessandrini)
- Sunshine Susie (December 1931, United Kingdom, directed by Victor Saville)
- The Private Secretary (December 1953, West Germany, directed by Paul Martin)
