= Sunshine Susie =

1931 film

- Animated opening title
- Directed by: Victor Saville
- Written by: István Békeffy (operetta); Angus MacPhail; Victor Saville; Franz Schulz; Robert Stevenson; István Szomaházy (novel); Noel Wood-Smith
- Produced by: Michael Balcon
- Starring: Renate Müller; Jack Hulbert; Owen Nares
- Cinematography: Mutz Greenbaum
- Edited by: Ian Dalrymple; Derek N. Twist
- Music by: Paul Abraham
- Production company: Gainsborough Pictures
- Distributed by: Ideal Films
- Release date: 6 December 1931
- Running time: 80 minutes
- Country: United Kingdom
- Language: English

Sunshine Susie (also known as The Office Girl) is a 1931 British musical comedy film directed by Victor Saville and starring Renate Müller, Jack Hulbert, and Owen Nares. The film was shot at Islington Studios with sets designed by Alex Vetchinsky. It was based on a novel by István Szomaházy. An alternate German-language version The Private Secretary (1931) was made, also starring Renate Müller. The film established Müller as a star in Britain.

== Synopsis ==
A young German woman moves to Vienna to seek work. With the assistance of Herr Hassell, a friendly commissionaire and budding conductor, she gains a job as a typist with a banking firm. Unknown to her, the man she takes to be a lowly clerk with the company who romances her at the local beer garden. is in fact the bank's director.

== Cast ==
- Renate Müller as Susie Surster
- Jack Hulbert as Herr Hasel
- Owen Nares as Herr Arvray
- Morris Harvey as Klapper
- Sybil Grove as secretary
- Gladys Hamer as maid
- Daphne Scorer as Elsa
- Barbara Gott as minor role

== Reception ==
The film was a big hit and was voted the best British film of 1932. Its theme song "Today I Feel So Happy" also became a major hit.

Kine Weekly wrote: "A bright, joyous British musical comedy which moves at an easy swing and allows romance, humour, and song to blend in happy proportions. Although the team work is great, it is Jack Hulbert, in a comedy characterisation, who is the hit of the show. He holds it together, and sees that the entertainment seldom flags."

The New York Times wrote that the film was "not up to the mark set by the Teutonic work, for the studio acoustics appear to be faulty and in several sequences the director, Victor Saville, has failed to have his scenes as adequately lighted," although the reviewer praised the work of Jack Hulbert and Owen Nares, concluding that "Both give clever performances, the result being that this Gainsborough feature makes for quite a good hour or so of entertainment."

The Motion Picture Herald praised the film as having "a sparkle in every foot."

== Other film versions ==
- Tales of the Typewriter (December 1916, Hungary, directed by Alexander Korda)
- The Private Secretary (January 1931, Germany, directed by Wilhelm Thiele)
- Dactylo (April 1931, France, directed by Wilhelm Thiele)
- The Private Secretary (July 1931, Italy, directed by Goffredo Alessandrini)
- The Private Secretary (December 1953, West Germany, directed by Paul Martin)

== Bibliography ==
- Bergfelder, Tim & Cargnelli, Christian. Destination London: German-speaking emigrés and British cinema, 1925–1950. Berghahn Books, 2008.
- Shafer, Stephen C. British Popular Films, 1929-1939: The Cinema of Reassurance. Routledge, 1997.
