= István Szomaházy =

Hungarian writer (1864–1927)

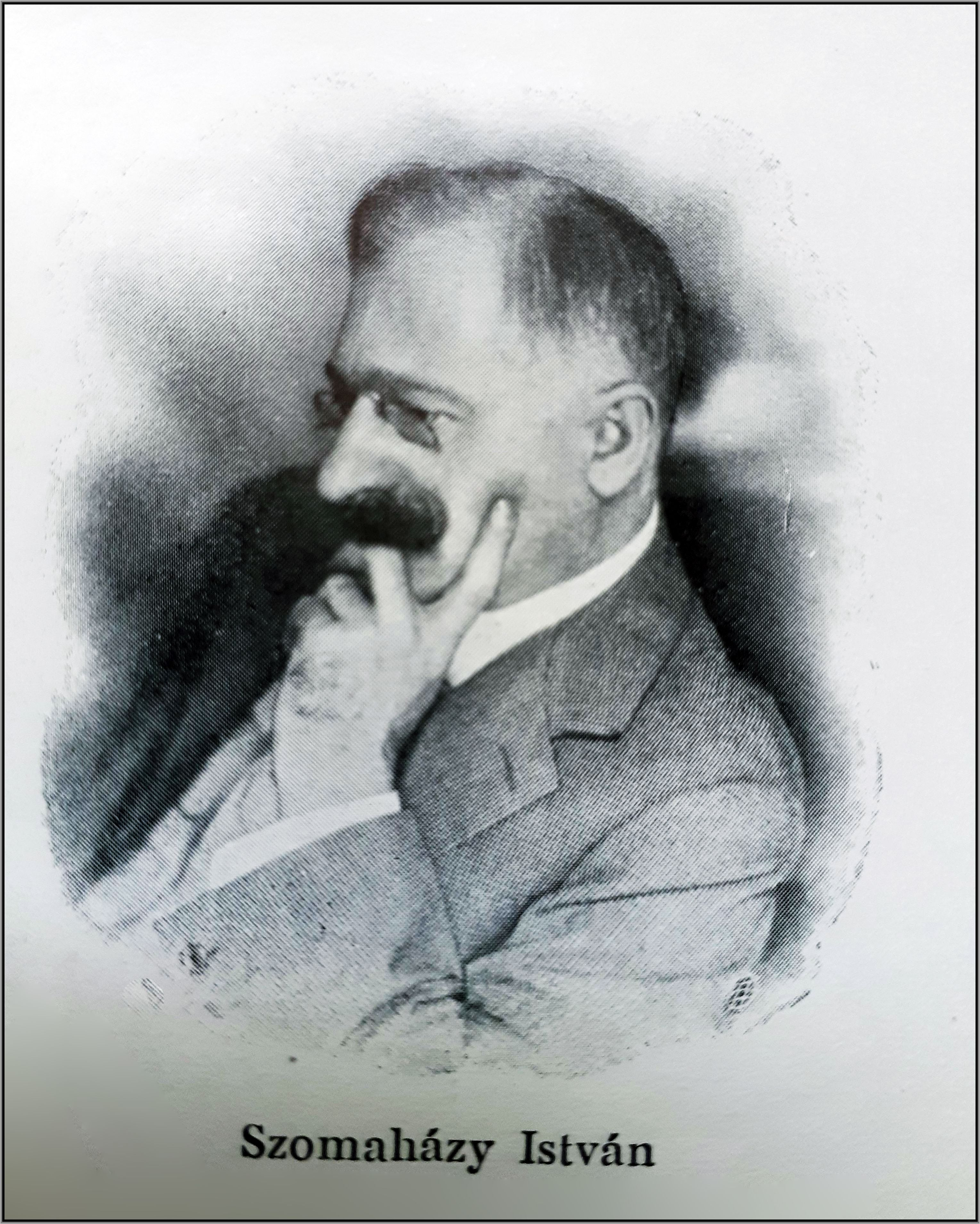

István Szomaházy (1864–1925 or 1927) was a journalist and writer in Hungary. He wrote many short stories. His stories were described as showing "gaiety and inexhaustible imagination." Several of his novels were adapted into films.

He was also known as Arnold Steiner.

Alex Korda met with him about film rights to his stories. The Carnegie Library of Pittsburgh had several of his books as well as books by other Hungarian authors.

== Writings ==
- The Private Secretary (1905)
- Kétszivü Pethő Singer és Wolfner (1909)
- Mindennapi Problémák
- Barátaim, a halottak (A kultura könyvkiadó és nyomda) (1920)

== Filmography ==
- Doctor Krausz on the Scaffold (1913), a Hungarian film A Krausz doktor a vérpadon
- Tales of the Typewriter (1916) directed by Alexander Korda
- The Typist, a French comedy film
- The Private Secretary (1931 German film)
- The Private Secretary (1931 Italian film)
- Sunshine Susie (1931), a British musical comedy
- The Private Secretary (1953 film)

== See also ==
- Hungarian cinema
- List of Hungarian films
