= Renate Müller =

German actress (1906–1937)

- photographed in 1935
- Born: 26 April 1906; Munich, German Empire
- Died: 7 October 1937 (aged 31); Berlin, Germany
- Other name: Renate Muller
- Occupation: Actress
- Years active: 1929–1937

Renate Müller (26 April 1906 – 7 October 1937) was a German singer and actress in both silent films and sound films, as well as on stage.

One of the most successful actresses in German films from the early 1930s, she was courted by the Nazi Party to appear in films that promoted their ideals, but refused. Her sudden death at the age of 31 was initially attributed to epilepsy, but after the end of World War II, some commentators asserted that she was in fact murdered by Gestapo officers, others that she committed suicide. The true circumstances of her death remain unknown.

== Life and career ==
Born in Munich, Kingdom of Bavaria, Germany, Müller entered films in 1929 in Berlin, and quickly became popular. A blue-eyed blonde, she was considered to be one of the great beauties of her day, and, along with Marlene Dietrich, was seen to embody fashionable Berlin society. She starred in more than twenty German films, including Viktor und Viktoria (1933), one of her biggest successes, which was remade decades later as Victor/Victoria with Julie Andrews. After making Sunshine Susie (1932) in England, she returned to Germany and was delayed by anti-German French officials for a short time in Paris. The incident was used by Dennis Wheatley as a basis for his short story, "Espionage". The story and a short discussion of the incident are included in Wheatley's short story collection Mediterranean Nights.

With the rise of the Nazi Party, Müller was later linked in some accounts to Adolf Hitler. She came to be regarded as an ideal "Aryan" woman; and, particularly in light of Dietrich's move to Hollywood, was courted and promoted as Germany's leading film actress.

== Death ==
When Müller died suddenly, the German press stated the cause as epilepsy. However, it was later revealed that she had died as a result of a fall from a hotel (or hospital) window. According to Channel 4 documentary "Sex and the Swastika", aired in February 2009, she jumped from a Berlin hospital window where she was being treated for a knee injury or drug addiction.

Officially described as a suicide, it was theorised that she took her own life when her relationship with Nazi leaders deteriorated after she showed unwillingness to appear in propaganda films. She was also known to have been pressured to end a relationship with her Jewish lover, but had refused. Near the end of her life, she became addicted to morphine and abused alcohol. Witnesses also recalled seeing several Gestapo officers entering her building shortly before she died. It has been conjectured that she was either murdered by Gestapo officers who threw her from a window, or that she panicked when she saw them arrive and jumped. The true circumstances surrounding her death remain unclear.

According to Uwe Klöckner-Draga in his book "Renate Müller – Ihr Leben ein Drahtseilakt", on 3 April, Goebbels wrote in his diary: "Renate tells me her tale of woe. She is a sick woman." On the 6th, he mentioned that she had been interrogated in a very dishonourable way, and on 25 June: "Renate Müller! I help her." At the end of September – according to her sister Gabriele – Renate was drunk and sitting on a window sill when she lost her balance.

Müller's life and death were portrayed in the 1960 film Sweetheart of the Gods.

== Filmography ==
List of film credits
Year-1930	Title	Role	Language	Notes
1929	Peter the Mariner	Victoria	Silent	Alternative title: Peter der Matrose
1929	Dear Homeland	Gretchen Jürgen	Silent	Alternative titles: Teure Heimat, Drei machen ihr Glück
1929	Revolt in the Reformatory	Hausvaters Tochter	Silent	Alternative titles: Revolte im Erziehungshaus
1930	Love in the Ring	Hilde, the Fish Peddler's Daughter	German	Alternative titles: Liebe im Ring, The Comeback
1930	The Son of the White Mountain	Mary Dulac	German	Alternative title: Der Sohn der weißen Berge
1930	Darling of the Gods	Agathe	German	Alternative titles: Darling of the Gods, Der Große Tenor
1930	The Flute Concert of Sanssouci	Blanche von Lindeneck	German	Alternative title: Flötenkonzert von Sans-souci
1931	The Private Secretary	Vilma Förster	German	Alternative titles: Die Privatsekretärin
1931	Liebeslied	Maria Körner	German	
1931	Storm in a Water Glass	Victoria Thoss	German	Alternative titles: Sturm im Wasserglas, Die Blumenfrau von Lindenau
1931	The Little Escapade	Erika Heller	German	Alternative title: Der kleine Seitensprung
1931	Sunshine Susie	Susie Surster	English	Alternative title: The Office Girl
1932	Marry Me	Ann Linden	English	
1932	Girls to Marry	Gerda Arnhold	German	Alternative title: Mädchen zum Heiraten
1932	How Shall I Tell My Husband?	Charlotte Oltendorf	German	Alternative title: Wie sag' ich's meinem Mann?
1932	When Love Sets the Fashion	Nelly	German	Alternative title: Wenn die Liebe Mode macht
1933	Season in Cairo	Stefanie von Weidling-Weidling	German	Alternative title: Saison in Kairo
1933	Idylle au Caire	Stéphy	French	
1933	Katti Lanner	German	Alternative titles: Walzerkrieg, Waltz Time in Vienna, The Battle of the Walzes	
1933	Victor and Victoria	Susanne Lohr	German	Alternative title: Viktor und Viktoria
1934	The English Marriage	Gerte Winter	German	Alternative title: Die englische Heirat
1935	The Private Life of Louis XIV	Liselotte von der Pfalz	German	Alternative titles: Liselotte von der Pfalz, Liselotte of the Palatinate
1935	Liebesleute	Dorothea Rainer	German	Alternative titles: Hermann und Dorothea von Heute, A Pair of Lovers
1936	Tomfoolery	Viola	German	Alternative titles: Allotria
1936	Escapade	Madame Hélène	German	Alternative titles: Geheimagentin Helene, His Official Wife, Spione in St. Petersburg
1937	Togger	Hanna Breitenbach	German	
