= Daniel Nicols =

French-born restaurateur

Daniel Nicols

Daniel Nicols (8 February 1833–28 February 1897) was a French-born restaurateur best known as the founder of the Café Royal in London. He became a naturalised British citizen in 1865.

== Early career ==
Born as Daniel Nicolas Thévenon in Champlost in Burgundy in France and the son of Jean Baptiste Thévenon, he was apprenticed to a coachbuilder in Sens before moving in the early 1850s to Paris, where he continued to work as a coachbuilder. He married his shop-assistant first cousin Célestine Lacoste (1831-1916) in Paris in 1854 and they had a daughter, Emma Josephine Thévenon (1856-1912). At about this time he bought a wine shop in Bercy in Paris from a relative, M. Champroux, for £240 saved from their salaries, and soon followed this with two further shops. When Champroux went bankrupt in 1863 Thévenon, who had guaranteed some of his debts, faced bankruptcy himself for 250,000 francs. Faced with being arrested for this debt he and his wife fled France to escape their creditors and arrived in London in October 1863. In 1864 he was sentenced in his absence to ten years' penal servitude; by 1871 he had repaid the debts but the Supreme Court of France did not cancel his sentence until 1890.

Nicols arrived in Britain in 1863 with Célestine and just five pounds in cash saved by his wife but with a considerable professional knowledge of French culture and cuisine virtually unknown in London and which quickly appealed to British tastes. On arriving in London the couple lodged in Soho where there was a large French population and where Nicols worked as an oddjob man while his wife found work as a seamstress.

== Café Royal ==
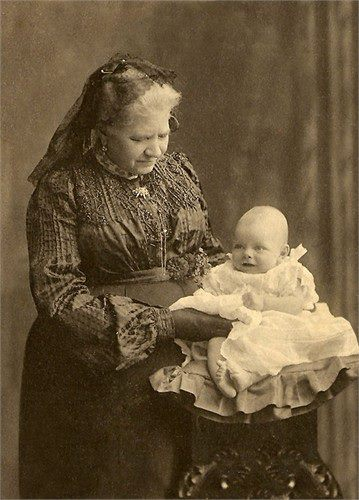
Célestine Nicols with her grand-daughter Louisa Lucie Anne Nicols Pigache in 1879

He Anglicised his name to Daniel Nicols and the couple set up their first venture as the 'Café Restaurant Nicols' at 19 Glasshouse Street near Piccadilly Circus in February 1865, but as its fame spread and it became the place to see and be seen he expanded the premises by buying a shop in Regent Street, behind the café, and in 1867 renamed it the Café Royal. He was naturalised as a British subject in April 1865. His future son-in-law Georges Alexandre Pigache (1851-1898) supervised the kitchens and his nephew Eugène Lacoste carefully selected the wines. In fact Lacoste bought so lavishly that Nicols was faced with bankruptcy for a second time but managed to pay off his creditors by selling one eighth of the wine stock.

After the Franco-Prussian War of 1870-1 many French political refugees settled in London and would gather at the Café Royal where they found a little piece of Parisian society, causing it to become a popular meeting place. The Café Royal flourished and was considered at one point to have the greatest wine cellar in the world. The 'N' displayed on all the glass, china, napkins and menus throughout the café actually stood for 'Nicols'.

== Success ==
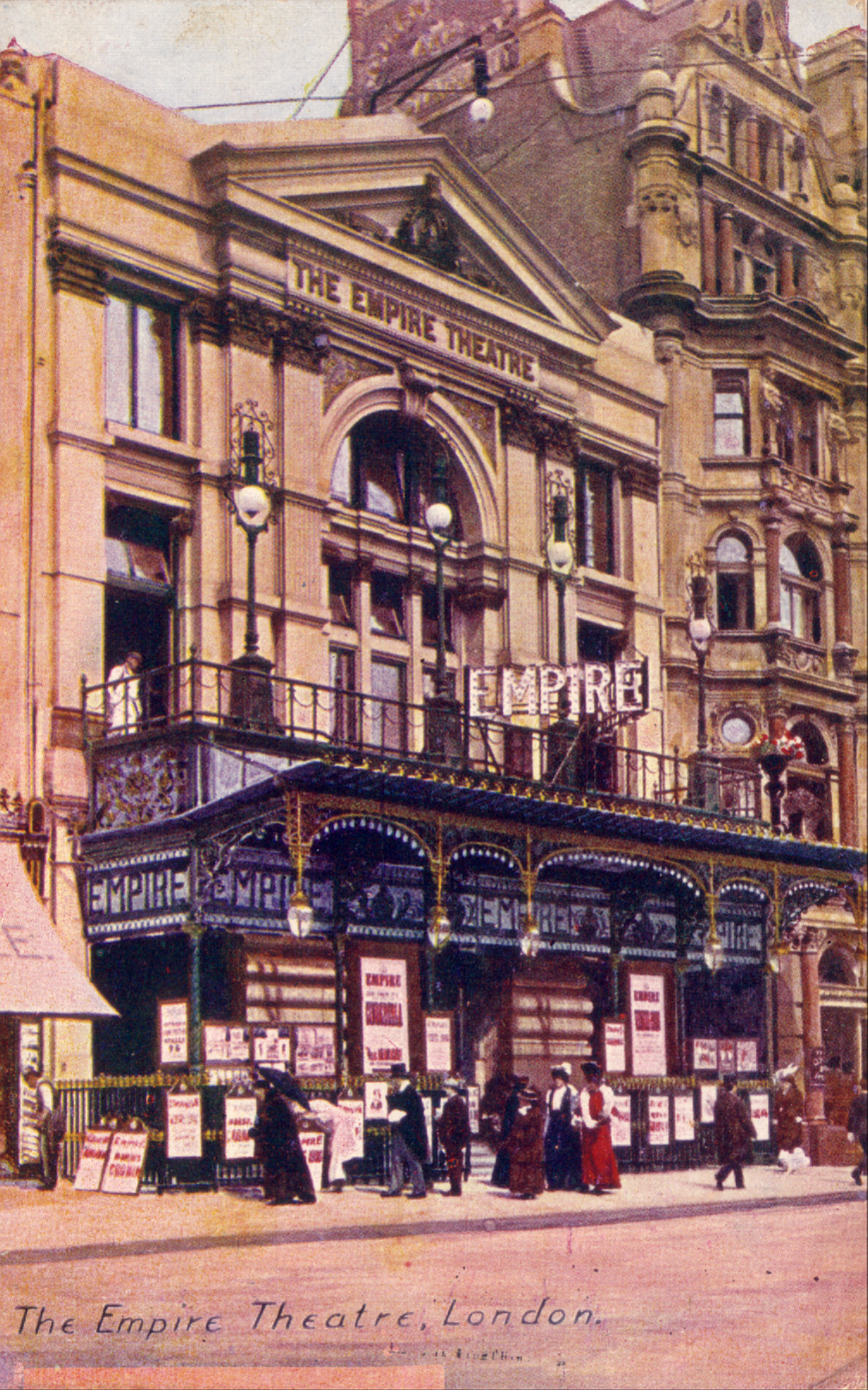
Empire Theatre in Leicester Square c.1905

With their new-found wealth, in the 1870s the Nicols bought a large estate with a deerpark and farmhouse in Surbiton, demolishing the farmhouse and building Regent House and employing an Italian artist to decorate it with the same rich fittings as the Café Royal. In 1884 they took over the derelict Pandora Theatre in Leicester Square and after decorating it in the same style as the Café Royal launched it as the variety theatre and ballet venue the Empire Theatre. The theatre had three unsuccessful seasons of comic opera which included Chilpéric, Edward Solomon and Sydney Grundy's comic opera, Pocahontas or The Great White Pearl, another Solomon opera, Polly or The Pet of the Regiment and his Billee Taylor - all in 1884, while Kate Vaughan starred in Around the World in 80 Days at the theatre in 1886. From 1887 the theatre became the music hall Empire Theatre of Varieties and, like the Café Royal, it too became a great success.

At Regent House the Nicols' entertained lavishly in their great ballroom with an orchestra conducted by Leopold Wenzel, or the entire corps de ballet of the Empire Theatre of Varieties, or, from 1887, the numerous music hall performers - all intended to amuse and entertain their weekend guests. As a prominent member of the French community in London Nicols belonged to the Société Nationale, the French gentlemen's club in London, and regularly donated to the French Hospital in Leicester Place. He was also a Freemason.

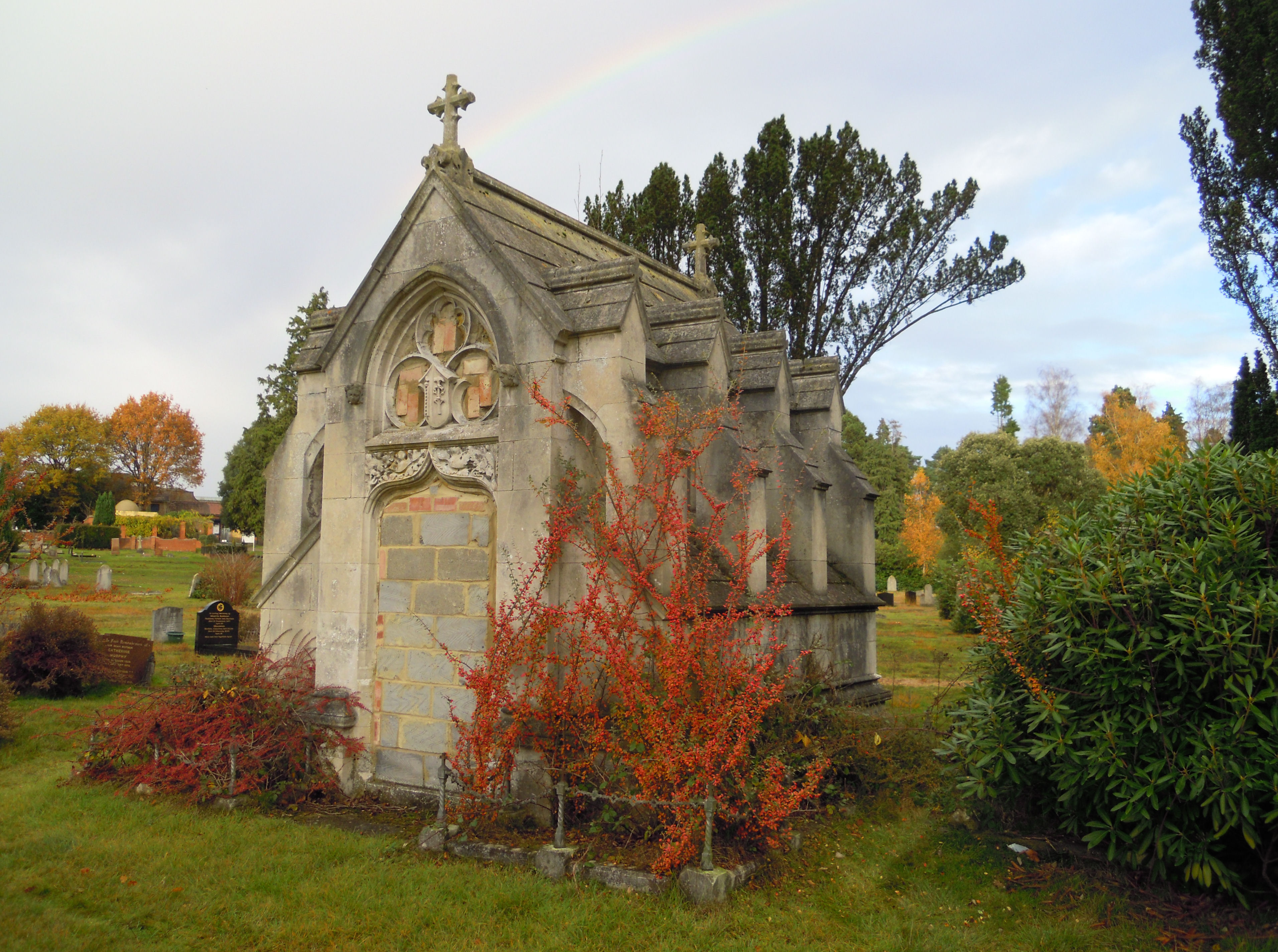
Daniel Nicols is buried in the family vault at Brookwood Cemetery

== Illness and death ==
Daniel Nicols suffered from diabetes for the last nine years of his life and died from gangrene of the foot and blood poisoning on 28 February 1897 at his home, Regent House, aged 64. He left an estate valued at £191,673, a considerable amount at that time, and his widow immediately disputed the will, claiming that as they had married in France the will was subject to French law and she was therefore entitled to half the income and capital. The court found in her favour but her daughter Emma and son-in-law Georges Pigache applied to the Court of Appeal, which reversed the previous judgement. Madame Nicols then in turn appealed to the House of Lords which in December 1899 reversed the appeal and upheld the original verdict in her favour. Célestine Nicols took over the management of the Café Royal and ran it until her own death in 1916.

Daniel Nicols is buried with his wife Celestine and daughter Emma Josephine in the family vault at Brookwood Cemetery. Their son-in-law Georges, reputed to be 35 stone at his death and Britain's largest man, was buried separately as his specially built casket was too large to fit in the vault.
