= The Private Secretary (1931 German film) =

1931 film

- Directed by: Wilhelm Thiele
- Written by: István Békeffy (operetta); Franz Schulz; István Szomaházy (novel)
- Produced by: Herman Millakowsky; Georg Witt
- Starring: Renate Müller; Hermann Thimig; Felix Bressart
- Cinematography: Otto Heller; Reimar Kuntze; Adolf Schlasy
- Edited by: Paul Martin
- Music by: Paul Abraham; Lajos Lajtai
- Production company: Greenbaum-Film
- Distributed by: Bavaria Film
- Release date: 16 January 1931
- Running time: 100 minutes
- Country: Germany
- Language: German

The Private Secretary (German: Die Privatsekretärin) is a 1931 German musical film directed by Wilhelm Thiele and starring Renate Müller, Hermann Thimig and Felix Bressart.

The film's sets were designed by Otto Hunte and Franz Koehn.

An English-language version Sunshine Susie was made, also starring Renate Müller. A French-language version Dactylo and an Italian-language The Private Secretary were also made. The film was remade in 1953. It was based on a 1905 novel by István Szomaházy.

== Cast ==
- Renate Müller as Vilma Förster
- Hermann Thimig as Bankdirektor Arvai
- Felix Bressart as Bankdiener Hasel
- Ludwig Stössel as Personalchef Klapper
- Gertrud Wolle as Pensionsmutter

== Other film versions ==
- Tales of the Typewriter (December 1916, Hungary, directed by Alexander Korda)
- Dactylo (April 1931, France, directed by Wilhelm Thiele)
- The Private Secretary (July 1931, Italy, directed by Goffredo Alessandrini)
- Sunshine Susie (December 1931, United Kingdom, directed by Victor Saville)
- The Private Secretary (December 1953, West Germany, directed by Paul Martin)
