= Rapture (1950 film) =

- Directed by: Goffredo Alessandrini
- Written by: Árpád Herczeg (novel); Geza Herczeg (screenplay)
- Release date: 1950
- Running time: 79 minutes
- Country: Italy
- Language: Italian

Rapture (Italian: Sangue sul sagrato) is a 1950 Italian melodrama film directed by Goffredo Alessandrini.

== Cast ==
- Glenn Langan as Pietro Leoni
- Elsie Albiin as Francesca Hutton
- Lorraine Miller as Marisa Hutton
- Eduardo Ciannelli as Arnaldo
- Douglass Dumbrille as W.C. Hutton
- Goffredo Alessandrini as Renato
- Harriet Medin as Nurse (as Harriet White)
- Luisa Rossi
- Carlo Ninchi
- Carlo Giustini
- Piero Lulli
- Virgilio Riento
- Emilio Cigoli
- Pina Gallini
