= The Private Secretary (1931 Italian film) =

1931 film

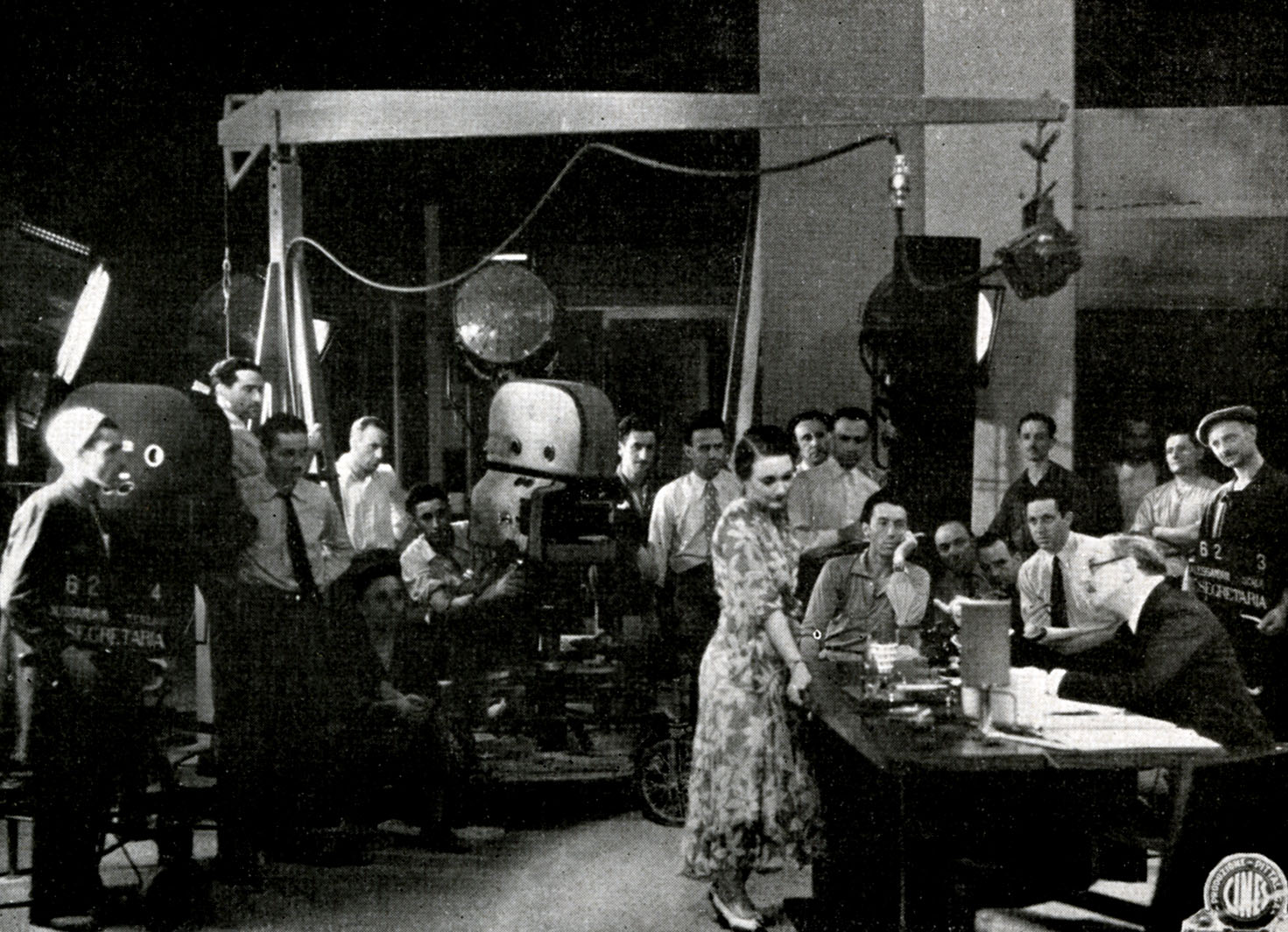
- Directed by: Goffredo Alessandrini
- Written by: István Szomaházy (novel); István Békeffy (operetta); Franz Schulz; Oreste Biancoli; Goffredo Alessandrini
- Produced by: Stefano Pittaluga
- Starring: Elsa Merlini; Nino Besozzi; Sergio Tofano; Cesare Zoppetti
- Cinematography: Domenico Scala; Massimo Terzano
- Edited by: Goffredo Alessandrini; Guy Simon
- Music by: Paul Abraham Lajos Lajtai
- Production company: Società Italiana Cines
- Distributed by: Società Italiana Cines
- Release date: 1931
- Running time: 78 minutes
- Country: Italy
- Language: Italian

The Private Secretary (Italian: La segretaria privata) is a 1931 Italian "white-telephones" musical film directed by Goffredo Alessandrini and starring Elsa Merlini, Nino Besozzi and Sergio Tofano. It was the Italian-language version of the German film Die Privatsekretärin.

== Plot ==
Elsa Lorenzi, a young woman from the provinces, arrives in the big city to find a job as a typist. Staying in a boarding house for single women, she finds employment at a large bank and forms good relationships with her colleagues. However, Elsa quickly encounters the hostility of the head of personnel, who hired her for sexual gain. One evening, late at night, Elsa meets Roberto Berri, a bank manager, whom she mistakes for a simple employee. They go out together, but Elsa rejects his advances, saying she wants to marry someone more successful. The complicated relationship between Elsa and Roberto is fraught with difficulties and misunderstandings, but ultimately ends well.

== Cast ==
- Elsa Merlini - Elsa Lorenzi
- Nino Besozzi - Il banchiere Roberto Berri
- Sergio Tofano - Otello, l'usciere
- Cesare Zoppetti - Rossi, il capo del personale
- Umberto Sacripante - Il direttore del 'Pergolato'
- Ermanno Roveri - Il gagà alla stazione
- Marisa Botti - La signorina Botti, segretaria
- Renato Malavasi as Un signore che riceve uno schiaffo al 'Pergolato'
- Alfredo Martinelli as Un cliente del 'Pergolato'
- Noemi Orsini as Padrona della Pensione Primavera

== Other film versions ==
- Tales of the Typewriter (December 1916, Hungary, directed by Alexander Korda)
- The Private Secretary (January 1931, Germany, directed by Wilhelm Thiele)
- Dactylo (April 1931, France, directed by Wilhelm Thiele)
- Sunshine Susie (December 1931, United Kingdom, directed by Victor Saville)
- The Private Secretary (December 1953, West Germany, directed by Paul Martin)

== Bibliography ==
- Gundle, Stephen. Mussolini's Dream Factory: Film Stardom in Fascist Italy. Berghahn Books, 2013.
