= Katti Lanner =

Viennese ballet dancer, choreographer and ballet mistress

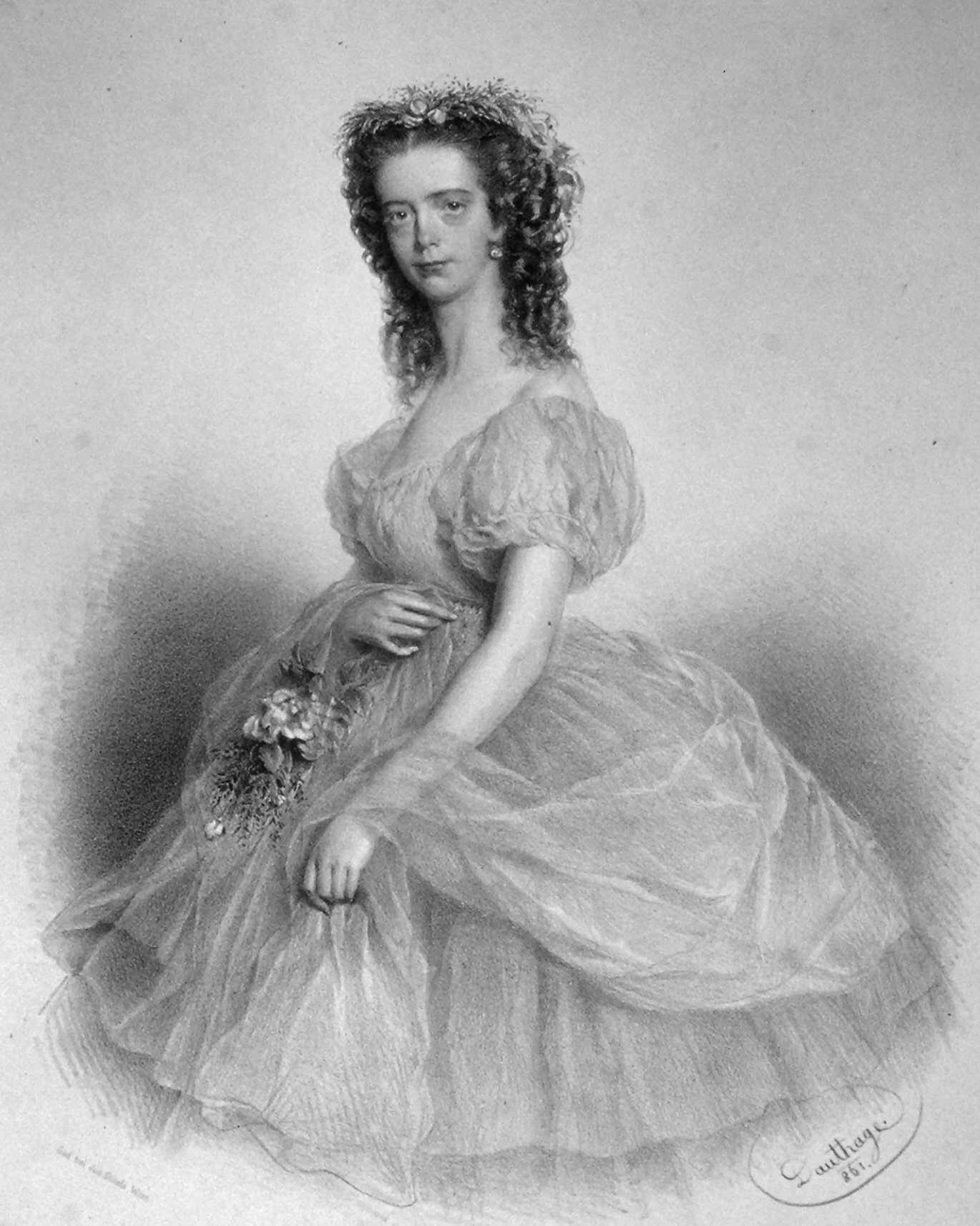
Katti Lanner, 1861; lithography by Adolf Dauthage

Katti Lanner (14 September 1829 – 15 November 1908) was a Viennese ballet dancer, choreographer, and ballet mistress who found fame in Germany and England, where she staged many productions at the Empire Theatre in London.

== Early life in Austria ==
Katharina Josefa Lanner, known as Katti, was the daughter of Josef Franz Karl Lanner (1801–1843) and his wife Franziska Jahns Lanner. Her father was director of dance music at the Viennese court and was celebrated as a composer and conductor, a great rival of the elder Johann Strauss, known as the Waltz King. She began her dance training at the age of 14 with Pietro Campilli and André Isidore Carey at the ballet school of the Wiener Hofoper (Vienna Court Opera). Having made her debut at the Theater am Kärntnertor in 1845 in the title role of Angelica by Antonio Guerras, she had her first great triumph in 1847 as Fennela, the title role of Daniel Auber's opera Die Stumme von Portici (The Dumb Girl of Portici). Thereafter, she appeared in ballets with Fanny Elssler, Marie Taglioni, and Paul Taglioni, dancing Myrtha in Giselle to great acclaim. Other principal roles in her repertory included those in Die Verwandelten Weiber by Paul Taglioni and Der Toreador by August Bournonville.

== Dancing in Germany and on tour ==
After her widowed mother died in 1855, Katti Lanner decided to leave Vienna and seek employment in Germany. Early in 1856 she had a great success in Berlin in the title role of Giselle, after which she went on to dance in Dresden, Munich, and Hamburg, where she choreographed her first major work, Uriella, der Dämon der Nacht (1857). In 1862, she was engaged as ballerina and ballet mistress at the Stadttheater Hamburg. Among the ten ballets she staged at the Hamburg Opera House were Die Rose von Sevilla (1862) and Asmodeus, oder Der Sohn des Teufels auf Reisen (1863). She also organized a children's ballet troupe, took the Hamburger Ballett on tour to Berlin, and made guest appearances elsewhere.

Around 1865, Lanner founded her own company, the Viennese Ballet and Pantomime Troupe, which toured extensively in 1869–1872 in Scandinavia, Russia, France, Portugal, the United States, and England. Everywhere she was acclaimed for her performances as Giselle. A critic for a Lisbon newspaper called her simply "the best ballerina known," In 1872, heading a troupe called the Kathi Lanner Choreographic Connection, she returned to New York to perform at the famous theater called Niblo's Garden. In the extravaganza Leo and Lotus and particularly the pantomime Azarel, her company received critical praise. A writer for The Spirit of the Times described its performance as 'well proportioned, harmonious, exact in time, graceful in its evolutions, and beautiful in its groupings." The following year, 1873, Lanner choreographed a ballet for fifty children as part of Augustin Daly's revival of A Midsummer Night's Dream.

== Working in England ==
Lanner settled in London in 1875 and the next year took on direction of the National Training School for Dancing. Founded by J. H. Mapleson at Her Majesty's Theatre, the school had been moved to the Theatre Royal, Drury Lane, in 1867, after Her Majesty's was destroyed by fire. Lanner was thus instrumental in establishing an institutional basis for English ballet. For the next eleven years, from 1876 to 1887, she supervised productions at the Theatre Royal, to the enthusiastic approval of audiences.

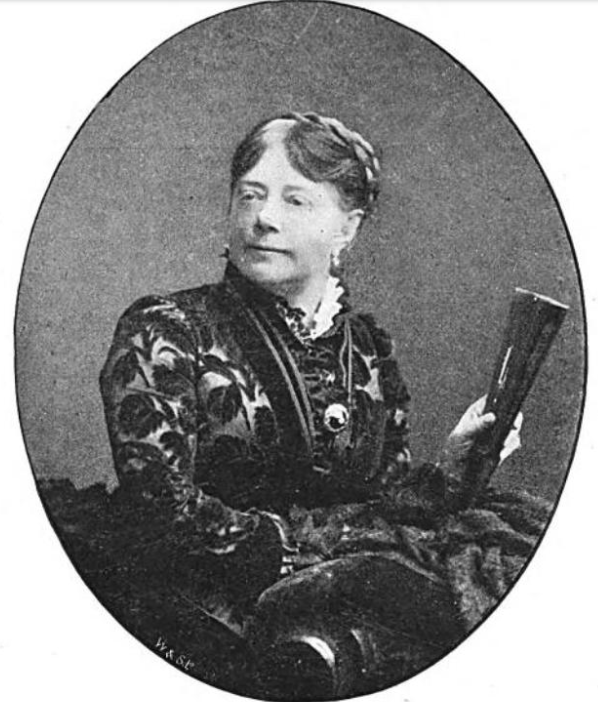
Katti Lanner before 1895

After the Empire Theatre of Varieties, a music hall, opened on Leicester Square in 1887, Lanner became the ballet mistress of the resident company. During her twenty years in this post, she produced thirty-four ballets, many in collaboration with composers Hervé (Florimond Ronger) and Leopold Wenzel and designer C. Wilhelm (William James Charles Pitcher). Among them were The Sports of England (1887), Cleopatra (1889), The Paris Exhibition (1889), Orfeo (1891), Round the Town (1892–1895), On Brighton Pier (1894), Faust (1895), The Dancing Doll (1904–1905), and Sir Roger de Coverly (1907). She also worked closely with Adeline Genée, prima ballerina of the company, who appeared in notable productions of Les Papillons (1900), High Jinks (1904), Cinderella (1906), and the British premiere of Coppélia (1906). Although Lanner had to make concessions to music hall audiences, she and Dame Adeline kept classical ballet alive in Britain during the Edwardian era, a somnolent period of activity. Lanner is a notable figure in dance history as she was the first woman to make a career as a choreographer.

== Personal life ==
Katti Lanner married ballet master and company director Johann-Baptist Alfred Karl Viktor Geraldini in 1868. They had three daughters—Katharina, Albertina, and Sophie—before their marriage ended in divorce. She died at Clapham, in southwest London, and was buried with fellow dancer Giuseppe Venuto de Francesco at West Norwood Cemetery.
