= Public Opinion (1954 film) =

1954 film by Goffredo Alessandrini

- Directed by: Maurizio Corgnati; Goffredo Alessandrini
- Written by: Maurizio Corgnati; Carlo Fruttero; Aldo Rossi; Charles Spaak; Franco Villani
- Produced by: Goffredo Alessandrini; Stefano Caretta; Franco Villani
- Starring: Daniel Gélin; Delia Scala; Giulio Calì
- Cinematography: Giovanni Ventimiglia
- Edited by: Rodolfo Palmeri
- Music by: Bruno Maderna
- Production companies: Caretta Film; La Société des Films Sirius; Villani Film
- Release date: 26 February 1954
- Running time: 92 minutes
- Countries: France; Italy
- Language: Italian

Public Opinion (French: Rumeur publique, Italian: Opinione pubblica) is a 1954 French-Italian drama film directed by Maurizio Corgnati and Goffredo Alessandrini and starring Daniel Gélin, Delia Scala and Giulio Calì.

== Plot ==
Following the death of his wife in unclear circumstances, the mechanic Egisto Bianchi is accused of auxoricide. A journalist begins to take care of the case and ignites public interest with a successful press campaign. The accused is acquitted for lack of evidence, but the reporter thinks he can still take advantage of the case by making a film of it. He then convinces some filmmakers to draw from the episode the subject of a film in which Bianchi himself will be the protagonist.

During the filming, the reporter discovers that Bianchi's wife was cheating on her husband. So he then decides to modify the film script, including adultery, and to be able to shoot without problems he makes Bianchi go away. But he returns and, unseen, witnesses the new scenes of the film in the cinema of the country. Bianchi, convinced that adultery is an invention, protests for the change, but the journalist reveals the truth to him, bringing the story to a dramatic ending.

== Cast ==
- Daniel Gélin as Paolo Jaier
- Delia Scala as Lauretta
- Giulio Calì
- Carlo Campanini as Leonide Forgesi, the producer
- Manfred Freyberger
- Maria Mauban as Dora Markus
- Paul Muller as Carlo Leone, the director
- Renato Salvatori as Mario
- Massimo Serato as Massimo Gorini
- Gianrico Tedeschi as Egisto Bianchi
- Luigi Tosi as Attilio
- Saro Urzì

== Bibliography ==
- Parish, Robert. Film Actors Guide. Scarecrow Press, 1977.
