= The Typist Gets Married =

1934 film by Joe May and René Pujol

- Theatrical film poster
- French: La dactylo se marie
- Directed by: René Pujol; Joe May
- Written by: Joe May; René Pujol; Franz Schulz
- Starring: Marie Glory; Jean Murat; Armand Bernard
- Cinematography: Franz Planer
- Music by: Paul Abraham
- Production company: Les Productions Milo Film
- Distributed by: Pathé Consortium Cinéma
- Release date: 18 May 1934
- Running time: 85 minutes
- Countries: France; Germany
- Language: French

The Typist Gets Married (French: La dactylo se marie) is a 1934 French-German comedy film directed by Joe May and René Pujol and starring Marie Glory, Jean Murat and Armand Bernard. It was a sequel to the 1931 film The Typist which also starred Glory.

The film's sets were designed by Max Heilbronner.

== Cast ==
- Marie Glory as Simone
- Jean Murat as Paul Derval
- Armand Bernard as Jules Fanfarel
- Mady Berry as Thérèse
- André Berley as Bloch
- Marcel Maupi as chauffeur
- Palau
- Rognoni as Gaillard
- Léon Larive as hotel's doorman
- Pierre Huchet as commissioner
- Nichette Yvon
- Teddy Dargy as Bloch
- Lucien Pardies
- Andrée Dorns
