= Franz Schulz =

Austrian playwright and screenwriter (1897–1971)

- Born: 22 March 1897; Prague, Austria-Hungary
- Died: 4 May 1971 (aged 74); Muralto, Ticino, Switzerland
- Resting place: Pambio-Naranco Jewish cemetery in Lugano, Ticino, Switzerland.
- Other names: Franz Spencer; Frank Spencer; Franz-Spencer-Schulz; Franz Spencer-Schulz; Franz G. Springer
- Citizenship: United States (naturalized)
- Education: Charles University in Prague
- Occupation: Screenwriter
- Years active: 1920-1956
- Known for: Champagner (1929); Die Privatsekretärin (1931); Bombs on Monte Carlo (1931); Midnight (1939); Adventure in Diamonds (1940); Born to Sing (1942); Masquerade in Mexico (1945); Invasion USA (1952)

Franz Schulz (born 22 March 1897 in Prague, Austria-Hungary, died 4 May 1971, in Muralto, Ticino, Switzerland) was a playwright and screenwriter who worked from 1920 through 1956.

== Biography ==
Schulz was born into a wealthy family, and although of the Jewish faith, religion played no role in the family. His father was a lawyer and a college friend of the writer Friedrich Adler. Lucia, one of his sisters, was the first wife of the painter László Moholy-Nagy.

Already as teenager Schulz visited cafes – centres of culture, then – and thus became acquainted with Max Brod, Egon Erwin Kisch, Franz Kafka, Paul Leppin, and Franz Werfel. Schulz graduated in 1915 from the Charles University in Prague and entered the army shortly thereafter. After the end of the World War I and subsequent release from service, he went to Berlin where he worked from 1918 to 1920 as a journalist, until writing for film. His early screenplays were for crime and drama films, before he turned his attention to comedy. His first "talkie" was the 1930 film Die Drei von der Tankstelle, followed in 1931 by feature film screenplays for Die Privatsekretärin and Bombs on Monte Carlo.

In 1933 Schulz emigrated to Prague. Forced out of the Germany film industry by the rise of The Third Reich, Schultz emigrated to England. In 1939, Schulz co-founded the 'Austrian Exile Theatre Laterndl' that attempted to preserve Viennese culture through performances of cabaret and stage plays until August 1945. The Laterndl became one of the "outstanding cultural achievements of German-speaking exile in London". In 1938-39 he worked with Billy Wilder and Charles Brackett to create the Mitchell Leisen comedy film Midnight. From 1940 on, and later as a naturalized US citizen, Shultz was officially Francis George Spencer. Upon the end of World War II emigrated to the United States where he continued work in film (and later television) as a screenwriter. Schulz later settled in Ascona, Switzerland and worked primarily as a playwright. His last feature film was the 1956 Drayman Henschel, for which he adapted the 1898 Gerhart Hauptmann stage play of the same name for director Josef von Báky.

On 4 May 1971, six weeks after his 74th birthday, Schulz/Spencer died at Muralto, Ticino, Switzerland. He is interred at the Pambio-Naranco Jewish cemetery in Lugano, Ticino, Switzerland.

== Career ==
=== Select filmography ===
==== Silent films ====
- Judith Trachtenberg (1920)
- Die Verwandlung (1920)
- Circus of Life (1921)
- The Red Masquerade Ball (1921)
- Im Kampf mit dem unsichtbaren Feind (1922)
- Die schwarze Schachdame (1922)
- Wettlauf ums Glück (1923)
- The Third Watch (1924)
- Leap Into Life (1924) (novel)
- The Pink Diamond (1926)
- Der goldene Abgrund (1927)
- The Trousers (1927)
- The Abduction of the Sabine Women (1928)
- Die Räuberbande (1928)
- Dyckerpotts' Heirs (1928)
- The Green Alley (1928)
- Princess Olala (1928)
- Abwege (1928)
- Love's Masquerade (1928)
- The President (1928)
- Sechs Mädchen suchen Nachtquartier (1928)
- Artists (1928) (writer)
- Prince or Clown (1928)
- The Gypsy Chief (1929)
- Father and Son (1929) (writer)
- The Convict from Istanbul (1929) (writer)
- Adieu Mascotte (1929) (writer)
- The Merry Widower (1929) (writer)
- Champagner (1929)
- My Daughter's Tutor (1929)

==== Sound films ====
- The Three from the Filling Station (1930)
- The Road to Paradise (1930)
- Va Banque (1930)
- Two Worlds (1930)
- The Son of the White Mountain (1930)
- Two Worlds (1930)
- Two Hearts in Waltz Time (1930)
- Delicatessen (1930)
- Die Privatsekretärin (1931)
- The Private Secretary (1931)
- The Office Girl (1931)
- Sunshine Susie (1931)
- The Typist (1931)
- Gloria (1931) (manuscript)
- My Cousin from Warsaw (1931, German)
- Ich heirate meinen Mann (1931)
- My Cousin from Warsaw (1931, French)
- Wiener Liebschaften (1931)
- The Girl and the Boy (1931)
- Amours viennoises (1931)
- Bombs on Monte Carlo (1931)
- Captain Craddock (1931)
- Monte Carlo Madness (1932)
- Das Mädel vom Montparnasse (1932)
- Love on Wheels (1932) (story)
- Girls to Marry (1932)
- Two Hearts Beat as One (1932)
- Amourous Adventure (1932)
- Madame Makes Her Exit (1932)
- The Lucky Number (1932) (story)
- Marry Me (1932) (story)
- Adventures on the Lido (1933)
- Sleeping Car (1933)
- What Women Dream (1933)
- A Daughter of Her People (1933)
- One Exciting Adventure (1934)
- Blossom Time (1934)
- The Typist Gets Married (1934)
- Two Hearts in Waltz Time (1934)
- Paris in Spring (1935)
- The Lottery Lover (1935)
- The Night Is Young (1935)
- Clothes and the Woman (1937)
- Midnight (1939)
- Lucky Partners (1940)
- Adventure in Diamonds (1940)
- Pacific Blackout (1941) (as Frank Spencer)
- Down in San Diego (1941) (as Franz Spencer)
- Born to Sing (1942) (as Franz G. Springer)
- Masquerade in Mexico (1945) (as Franz Spencer)
- The Fighting Guardsman (1946) (as Franz Spencer)
- Invasion USA (1952) (as Franz Spencer)
- Drayman Henschel (1956) (as Franz-Spencer-Schulz)

==== Television ====
- The Hunter (1 episode, 1952) (TV)
  Episode "Black and White Sheep" (1952) (as Franz Spencer)
- Janet Dean, Registered Nurse (1 episode, 1954) (TV)
  Episode "The Kennedy Case" (1954)

=== Partial theatre ===
- Judith Trachtenberg (1920)
- Esther Labarre (1927)
- The Lost Waltz (1933)
- A Window Facing East (1949)
- The happy anthill (1952)
- Die Drehtür (1959)
- The Villa of Madame Vidac (1959)

=== Bibliography ===
- Candide 19... oder das miese Jahrhundert (1966) ISBN 3-7466-1029-X
- Battles of a Bystander (1941) (autobiographical novel)
- Der Sprung ins Leben (1924) (novel)
- Die Räuberbande (1928) (manuscript)
- Two Worlds (1930) (manuscript)
- Gloria (1931) (manuscript)
- Midnight (1938) (manuscript)
- Adventure in diamonds (1939) (manuscript)
