= István Békeffy =

Hungarian screenwriter

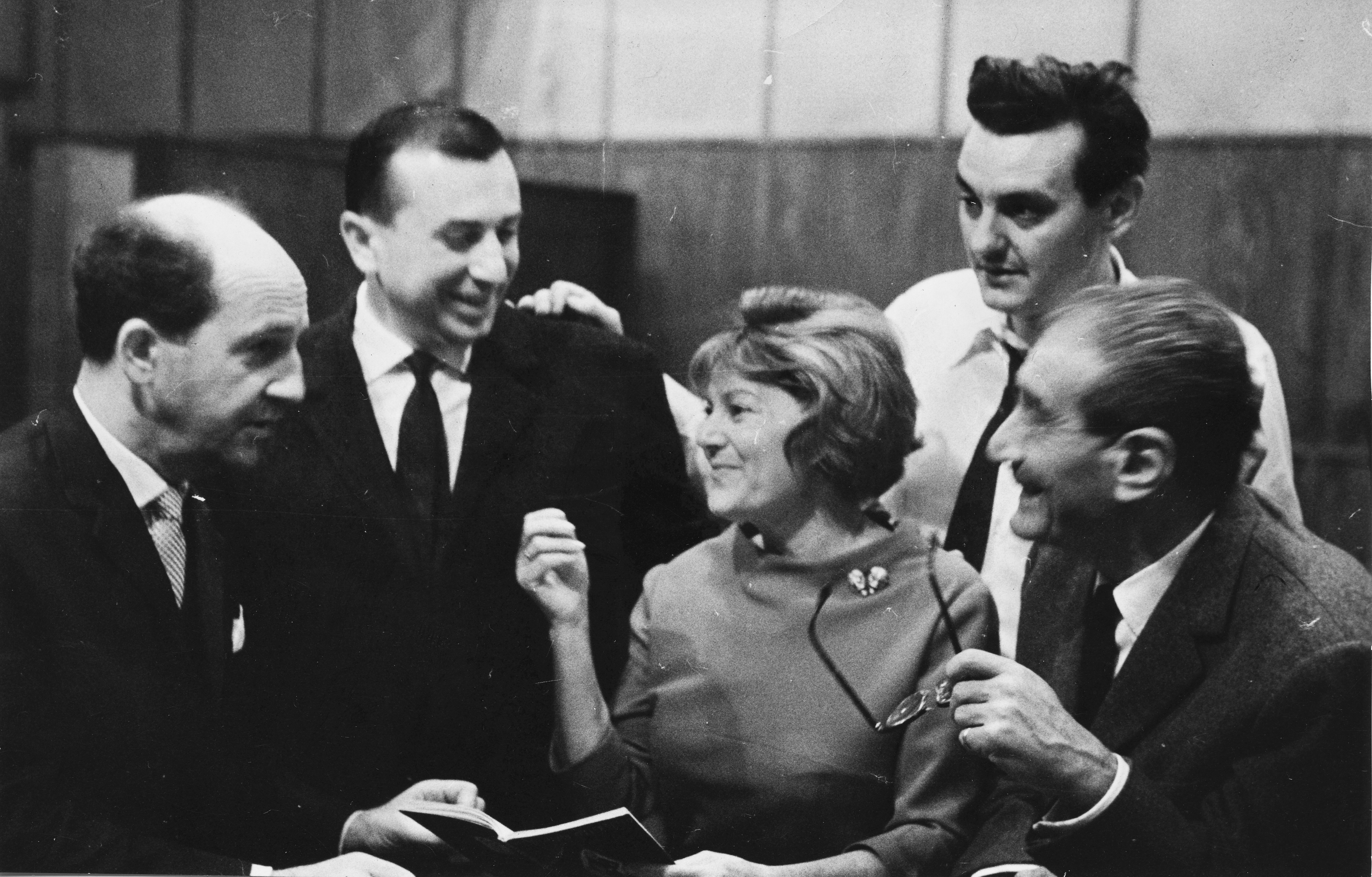
- Békeffy (right) in 1964 with his wife Ida Turay and others.
- Born: 31 August 1901; Szeged, Austro-Hungarian Empire
- Died: 9 June 1977 (aged 75); Budapest, Hungary
- Occupation: Writer
- Years active: 1933–1973 (film)

István Békeffy (August 31, 1901 – June 9, 1977) was a Hungarian screenwriter and playwright. He was married to the actress Ida Turay from 1926. In 1957, following the failed Hungarian Revolution, he moved to Switzerland and wrote screenplays for the West German film industry. These included several comedies featuring Heinz Rühmann. He returned to Hungary in 1971.

== Selected filmography ==
=== Screenwriter ===
- Miss Iza (1933)
- Miss President (1935)
- The Wise Mother (1935)
- Fräulein Lilli (1936)
- The Borrowed Castle (1937)
- Roxy and the Wonderteam (1938)
- Rosemary (1938)
- The Minister's Friend (1939)
- No Coincidence (1939)
- Seven Plum Trees (1940)
- The Gyurkovics Boys (1941)
- Three Bells (1941)
- Magdolna (1942)
- Cadet Love (1942)
- Suburban Guard Post (1943)
- The Schoolmistress (1945)
- The Siege of Beszterce (1948)
- Mickey Magnate (1949)
- Singing Makes Life Beautiful (1950)
- Déryné (1951)
- Erkel (1952)
- Try and Win (1952)
- Tale on the Twelve Points (1957)
- The Man Who Walked Through the Wall (1959)
- Everybody Loves Peter (1959)
- The Black Sheep (1960)
- The Juvenile Judge (1960)
- The Liar (1961)
- The Shadows Grow Longer (1961)
- Max the Pickpocket (1962)
- A Nearly Decent Girl (1963)
- Praetorius (1965)

=== Adapted from his works ===
- Sunshine Susie (1931)
- The Private Secretary (1931, German)
- The Private Secretary (1931, Italian)
- The Typist (1931)
- Kiss and Make-Up (1934)
- Unjustified Absence (1939)
- Janika (1949)
- Playing Truant (1949)

== Bibliography ==
- Goble, Alan. The Complete Index to Literary Sources in Film. Walter de Gruyter, 1999.
- Görtz, Franz Josef & Sarkowicz, Hans. Heinz Rühmann, 1902-1994: der Schauspieler und sein Jahrhundert. C.H.Beck, 2001.
- Khatib, Lina H., Storytelling in World Cinemas, Volume 1. Columbia University Press, 2012.
