= Congo Express (film) =

1939 film

- German film poster
- German: Kongo-Express
- Directed by: Eduard von Borsody
- Written by: Johanna Sibelius; Eduard von Borsody; Ernst von Salomon
- Produced by: Georg Witt
- Starring: Marianne Hoppe; Willy Birgel; René Deltgen
- Cinematography: Igor Oberberg
- Edited by: Lisbeth Neumann
- Music by: Werner Bochmann
- Production company: UFA
- Distributed by: UFA
- Release date: 15 December 1939
- Running time: 88 minutes
- Country: Germany
- Language: German

Congo Express (German: Kongo-Express) is a 1939 German adventure film directed by Eduard von Borsody and starring Marianne Hoppe, Willy Birgel. and René Deltgen.

The film's sets were designed by the art director Franz Koehn. Location shooting took place on railway lines close to Celle.

== Cast ==
- Marianne Hoppe as Renate Brinkmann
- Willy Birgel as Viktor Hartmann
- René Deltgen as Gaston Thibault
- Hermann Speelmans as Chagrin
- Max Gülstorff as Dr. MacPhearson
- Lotte Spira as Sister Mary
- Malte Jaeger as Pierre Dufour
- Heinz Engelmann as Raoul Burell
- Toni von Bukovics as Raoul's Mother
- Hans Adalbert Schlettow as André
- Hans Hermann Schaufuß as Mollison
- Leonie Duval as Mrs. Mollison
- Willi Schur as Matthieu
- Ernst Rotmund as Tsessebe station master
- Edwin Jürgensen as Prefect
- Fritz Hube as Mondome station master
- Walter Lieck as Prefect's secretaryMayor
- Lutz Götz as Distriktkommissar
- Albert Ihle as Mayor of Lukanga
- Erik Radolf as First farmer
- Manfred Meurer as Second farmer
- Hans Schneider as Third farmer
- Walter Schramm-Dunker as Fourth farmer
- Kurt Hagen as Fifth farmer
- Angelo Ferrari as Sixth farmer
- Louis Ralph as Seventh farmer
- Herbert Schimkat as Eighth farmer
- Rudolf Vones as Ninth farmer
- Hermann Meyer-Falkow as Tenth farmer
- Fritz Eckert as Kolonialoffizier
- Toni Tetzlaff as Aunt Estella
- Antonie Jaeckel as First Aunt
- Maria Krahn as Second Aunt
- Anneliese Würtz as Third Aunt
- Luise Morland as Sophie

== Bibliography ==
- Kreimeier, Klaus (1999). The Ufa Story: A History of Germany's Greatest Film Company, 1918-1945. Translated by Kimber, Robert; Kimber, Rita. Berkeley, CA: University of California Press. ISBN 0520220692.
