= Franz Koehn =

German art director

- Born: 9 December 1889; Augustwalde, Pomerania, German Empire
- Died: Unknown
- Occupation: Art director
- Years active: 1931-1950 (film)

Franz Koehn was a German art director. He worked designing sets for the German film industry, mainly during the Nazi era.

== Selected filmography ==
- The Private Secretary (1931)
- The Typist (1931)
- The Traitor (1936)
- Women's Regiment (1936)
- My Son the Minister (1937)
- Frau Sixta (1938)
- Congo Express (1939)
- The False Step (1939)
- Laugh Bajazzo (1943)
- Light of Heart (1943)
- Kohlhiesel's Daughters (1943)
- Harald Arrives at Nine (1944)
- The Marriage of Figaro (1949)
- Heart of Stone (1950)

== Bibliography ==
- Giesen, Rolf. Nazi Propaganda Films: A History and Filmography. McFarland, 2003.
