= How Shall I Tell My Husband? =

1932 film

- Directed by: Reinhold Schünzel
- Written by: Friedrich Dammann; Heinz Gordon; Felix Jackson; Herbert Rosenfeld
- Produced by: Günther Stapenhorst
- Starring: Renate Müller; Georg Alexander; Ida Wüst
- Cinematography: Carl Hoffmann
- Edited by: Arnfried Heyne
- Music by: Theo Mackeben
- Production company: UFA
- Distributed by: UFA
- Release date: 18 October 1932
- Running time: 87 minutes
- Country: Germany
- Language: German

How Shall I Tell My Husband? (German: Wie sag' ich's meinem Mann?) is a 1932 German comedy film directed by Reinhold Schünzel and starring Renate Müller, Georg Alexander, and Ida Wüst. It was shot at the Babelsberg and Tempelhof Studios in Berlin. The film's sets were designed by the art director Werner Schlichting. Location filming took place at Heringsdorf on the Baltic Sea. It premiered at the Gloria-Palast in Berlin.

== Synopsis ==
Charlotte Oltendorf's husband is very loving towards her but also very strict. So she decides not to tell him she and her friend Hilde went away for a few days to stay at a seaside resort while he was on a business trip. However, he soon begins to suspect she has been lying to him. More complications ensue when the wife of a man she met on the train mistakenly believes that Charlotte has been having an affair with her husband.

== Cast ==
- Renate Müller as Charlotte Oltendorf
- Georg Alexander as Direktor Oltendorf
- Ida Wüst as Hilde Falk
- Otto Wallburg as Hugo Brickner
- Georgia Lind as Lissy
- Paul Westermeier as Fahrlehrer Adolf Schott
- Heinz Gordon as Lawyer Burghardt
- Kurt Vespermann as Diener Johann
- Gertrud Wolle as Frau Kötelhön
- Rudolf Platte as Beamter

== Bibliography ==
- Bock, Hans-Michael; Bergfelder, Tim, eds. (2009). The Concise Cinegraph: Encyclopaedia of German Cinema. New York: Berghahn Books. ISBN 978-1-57181-655-9.
