= Georg Witt =

German film producer

- Born: 14 January 1899; Moscow, Russian Empire
- Died: 17 April 1973 (aged 74); West Berlin, West Germany
- Occupation: Producer
- Years active: 1929–1960
- Spouse: Lil Dagover (m.1926)

Georg Witt (14 January 1899 – 17 April 1973) was a Russian-born German film producer. Born in Moscow, he moved to Germany at a young age. He produced around forty films, including the 1955 Liselotte Pulver comedy I Often Think of Piroschka. He was the second husband of the actress Lil Dagover.

== Selected filmography ==
- The Adjutant of the Czar (1929)
- Favorite of Schonbrunn (1929)
- The Ring of the Empress (1930)
- The Private Secretary (1931)
- The Typist (1931)
- Thea Roland (1932)
- The Sun Rises (1934)
- Land of Love (1937)
- The Mystery of Betty Bonn (1938)
- The Deruga Case (1938)
- Triad (1938)
- Between the Parents (1938)
- Detours to Happiness (1939)
- Congo Express (1939)
- Tonelli (1943)
- Orient Express (1944)
- The Blue Straw Hat (1949)
- Chased by the Devil (1950)
- I Often Think of Piroschka (1955)
- My Husband's Getting Married Today (1956)
- Salzburg Stories (1957)
- The Spessart Inn (1958)
- The Angel Who Pawned Her Harp (1959)
- The Haunted Castle (1960)

== Bibliography ==
- Goble, Alan. The Complete Index to Literary Sources in Film. Walter de Gruyter, 1999.
