= Leopold Wenzel =

Italian conductor and composer (1847–1923)

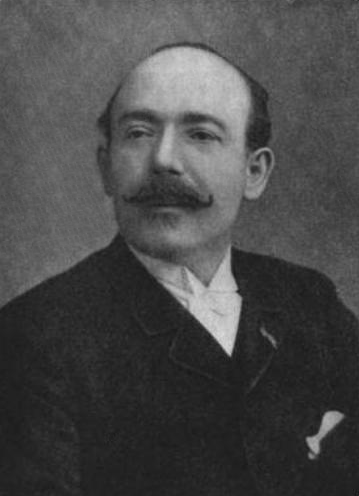
- In The Sketch in 1904
- Born: 23 January 1847; Naples, Kingdom of the Two Sicilies
- Died: 21 August 1923 (aged 76); Asnières, France
- Occupations: Conductor, composer

Léopold de Wenzel (23 January 1847 – 21 August 1923), also known as Leopold Wenzel, was an Italian-born conductor and composer, known for his ballets and contributions to Edwardian musical comedies, who spent most of his career in Britain.

== Biography ==
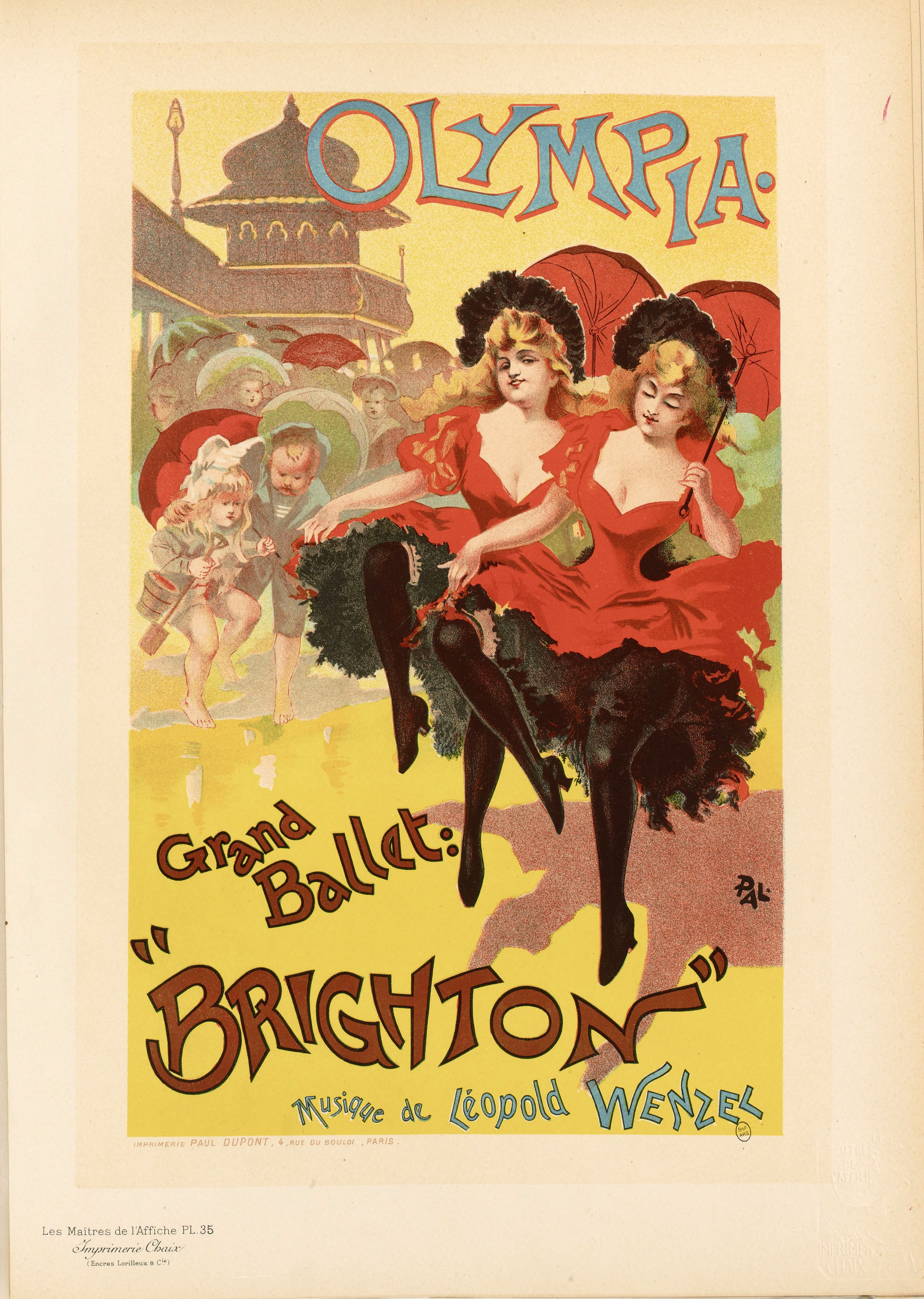
Poster for the ballet Brighton in the Olympia

Born in Naples, Kingdom of the Two Sicilies, Wenzel spent most of his career working in London, with the exception of some years spent in Paris. Wenzel was appointed as musical director, music arranger and ballet composer at the Empire Theatre of Varieties in London in 1889, where he wrote and arranged numerous ballets. Later, he conducted at the Gaiety Theatre in London until 1913. In addition to ballets, his many works include art songs, orchestral works, and operas in the late Victorian era and early Edwardian period. Some of his songs were incorporated into Edwardian musical comedies. He died in Asnières, near Paris, on 21 August 1923.

== Selected works ==
Ballets with choreographer Katti Lanner at the Empire:

- A Dream of Wealth (1889)
- Cécile (1890)
- Dolly (1890)
- Orfeo (1891)
- By the Sea (1891)
- Nisita (1891)
- Versailles (1892)
- Round the Town (1892)
- Katrina (1893)
- The Girl I Left Behind Me (1893)
- Brighton (Paris Olympia music hall)
- Monte Cristo (1896)
- Under One Flag (1897)
- The Press (1898)
- Alaska (1898)
- Round the Town Again (1899)
- Sea-Side (1900)
- Les Papillons (1901)
- Old China (1901)
- Our Crown (1902)
- The Milliner Duchess (1903)
- Vineland (1903)
- High Jinks (1904)

Operas

- Le Chevalier Mignon (1884, Paris)
- L'Élève du Conservatoire (1894, Paris)

Other works

- Cinder Ellen up too late (1891), a burlesque on the fairy tale Cinderella (additional numbers)
- An Artist's Model, an Edwardian musical comedy (1895) (additional numbers)
