= Empire Leicester Square =

Cinema in Leicester Square, London

Empire, Leicester Square
- 1884: Empire Theatre; 1887: Empire Theatre of Varieties
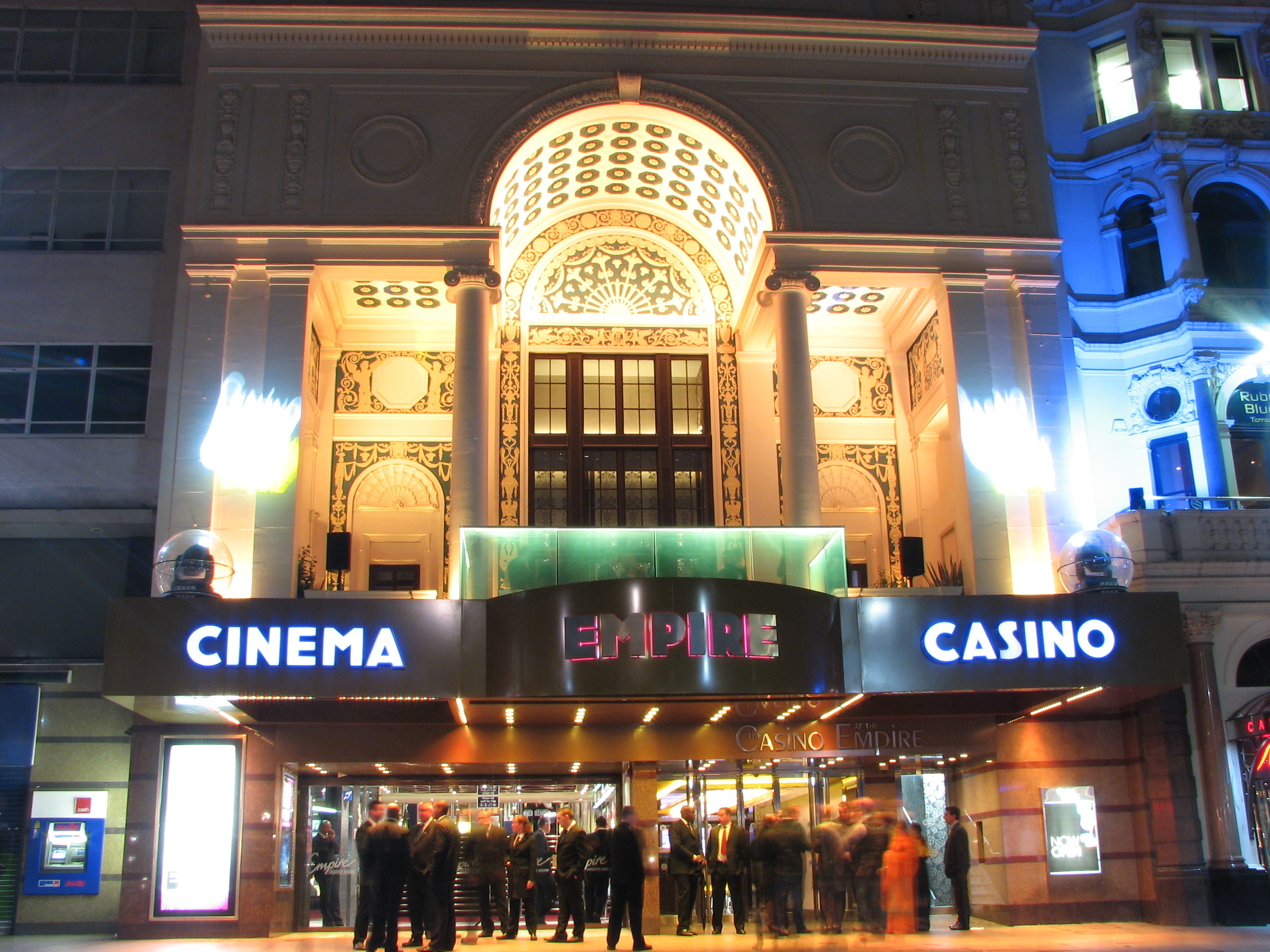
- Empire, Leicester Square, in 2007
- Interactive map of Empire, Leicester Square
- Address: 5-6 Leicester Square; London; WC2H 7NA; England
- Coordinates: 51.510833°N 0.130278°W
- Owner: Cineworld
- Capacity: 2,000 in 1884; 3,000 in 1927; 1,330 in 1962; 1,746 today
- Current use: Premiere cinema
- Public transit: Leicester Square

Construction
- Opened: 17 April 1884; 142 years ago
- Rebuilt: 1893: Frank Verity; 1928: Thomas Lamb; 1962: George Coles; 1989: Esquisse Design; 2014: UNICK Architects; 2018: Chapman Taylor/Innebo Architects
- Years active: 1884–1927 as theatre 1928–present as cinema
- Architects: Thomas Verity; Thomas Lamb

Website
- Official website

The Empire, Leicester Square is a cinema currently operated by Cineworld on the north side of Leicester Square, London, England.

The Empire was originally built in 1884 as a variety theatre and was rebuilt for films in the 1920s. It is one of several cinemas in and adjoining Leicester Square which are regularly used for film premieres and first runs.

Today, it has nine auditoriums, including an IMAX, a Superscreen and a 4DX screen.

== History ==
=== 1884: The Empire Theatre opens ===
The Empire Theatre opened on 17 April 1884 under the ownership of Daniel Nicols as a West End variety theatre on Leicester Square, as well as a ballet venue, with a capacity of about 2,000 seats.

The first performance was Chilpéric, with music by Hervé, adapted by H. Hersee and H. B. Farnie and described as a Grand Musical Spectacular, in three acts and seven tableaux. The corps de ballet for the performance was 50 strong. Edward Solomon and Sydney Grundy premièred their comic opera, Pocahontas or The Great White Pearl, another Solomon opera, Polly or The Pet of the Regiment transferred here, and his Billee Taylor was revived here, all in 1884. Kate Vaughan starred in Around the World in 80 Days at the theatre in 1886. Hervé premièred his Diana (1888) and Cleopatra (1889) at the theatre.

In 1887, the theatre reopened as a popular music hall named the Empire Theatre of Varieties. From 1887 to 1915, the designer C. Wilhelm created both scenery and costumes for (and sometimes produced) numerous ballets at the theatre, which established a fashion for stage design and were much imitated. George Edwardes managed the theatre around the start of the 20th century. The dancer Adeline Genée and the theatre's ballet company, working under composer-director Leopold Wenzel, did much to revive the moribund art of ballet in Britain, which had declined in the 19th century.

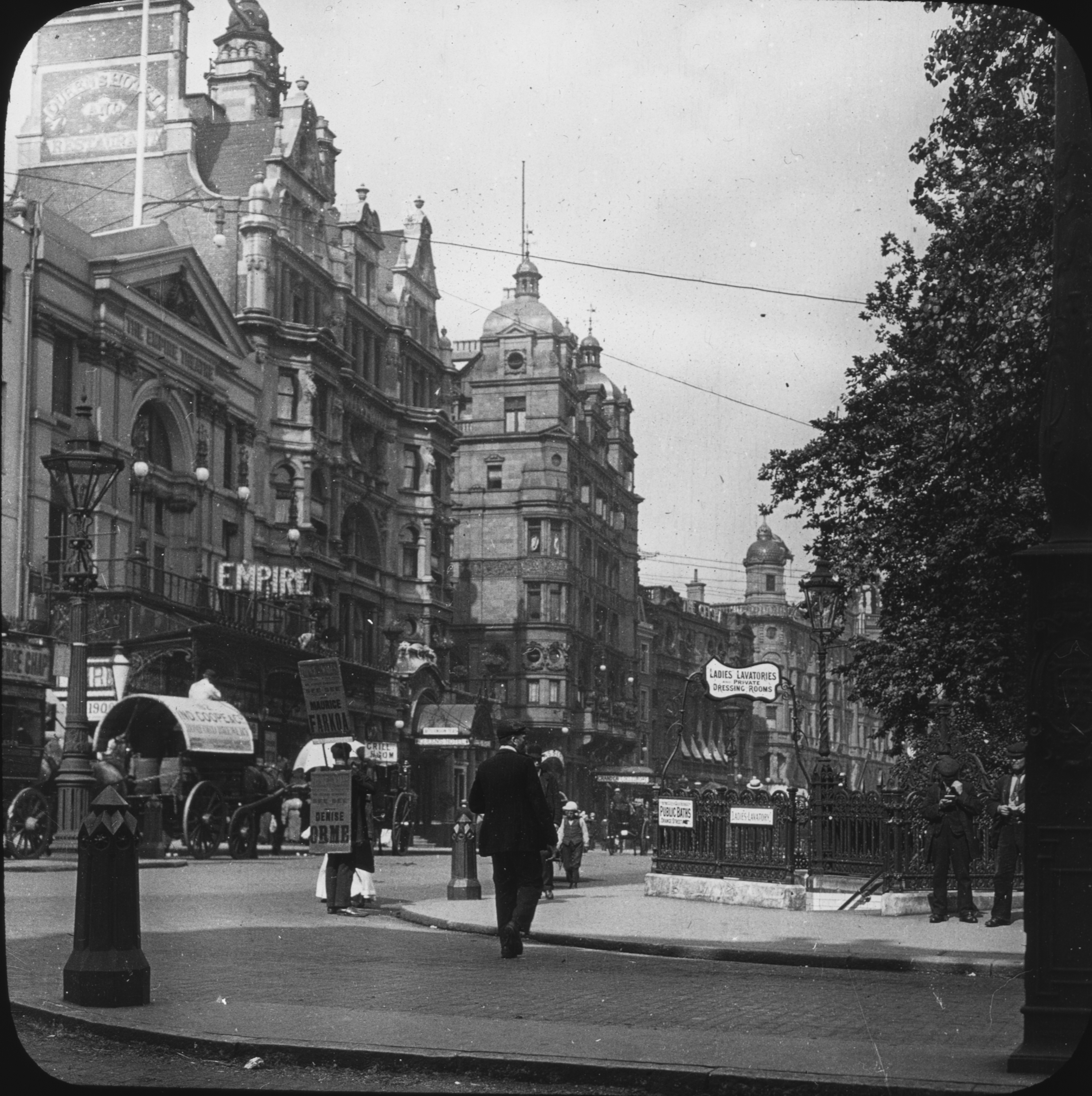
Photography of the theatre in 1906

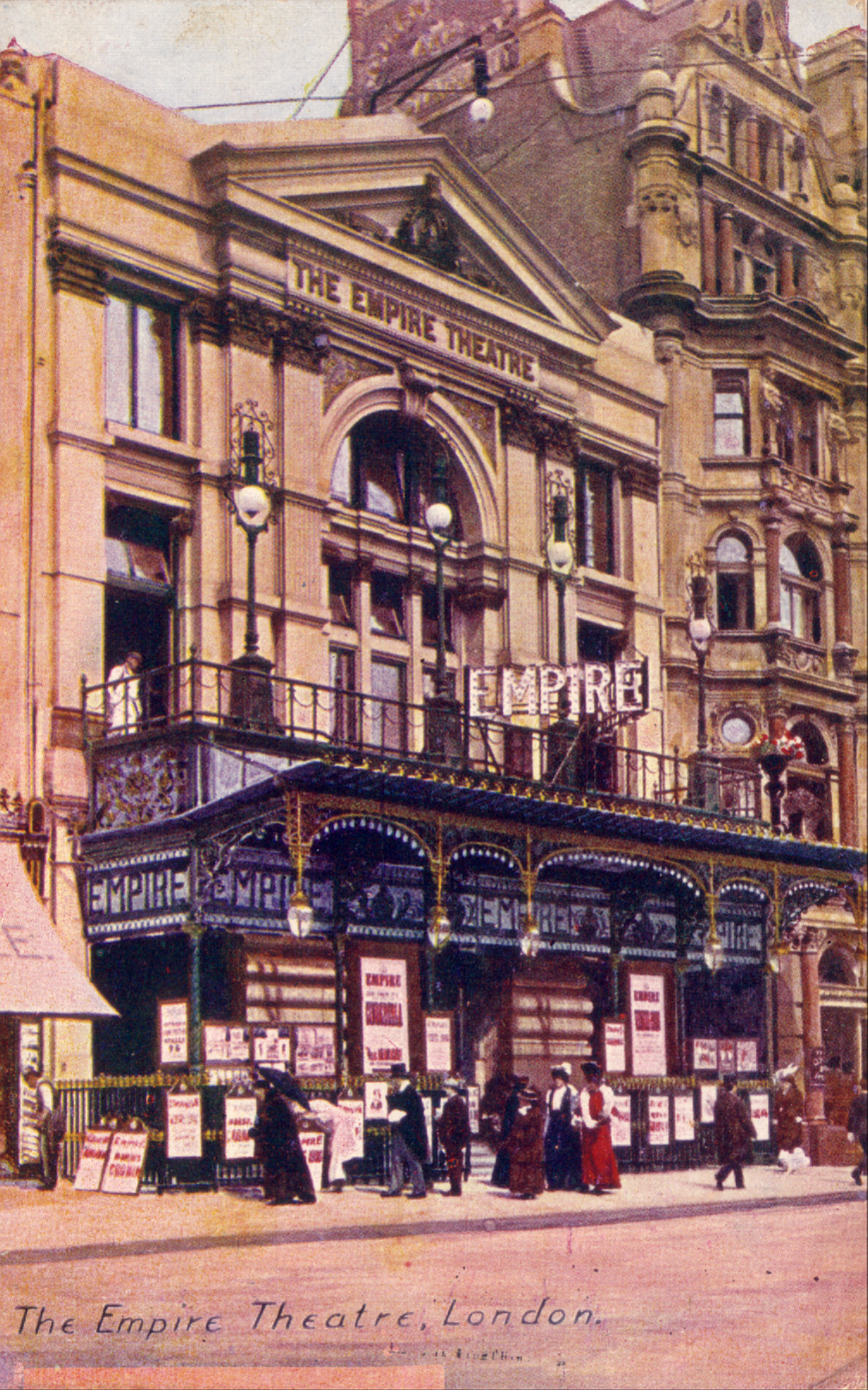
c.1905, the Empire Theatre, Leicester Square

An extension providing secondary access from Leicester Street via a new foyer was added in 1893, with Frank Verity as the architect.

In March 1896, the Empire Theatre played host to the first commercial theatrical performances of a projected film to a UK audience by Auguste and Louis Lumière. The film programme ran for 18 months. Over the next few years, the theatre began to offer a programme of live performances with short film shows.

=== 1927: Rebuilt as a cinema ===
As moving pictures grew in popularity in the 1920s, the freehold of the Empire was acquired for redevelopment in 1925 for over $1 million by Metro-Goldwyn-Mayer in partnership with Solly Joel, with its last live theatre performance being Lady Be Good, starring Fred Astaire.

Most of the theatre was demolished in 1927, with the Empire rebuilt as a film theatre on an expanded site with the auditorium block now extending East to Leicester Place; the architect was Thomas W. Lamb with assistance from F. W. Boettcher and Frederick G. M. Chancellor of Frank Matcham and Company as the local architect, and the Anglo-Scottish Construction Company Ltd was the contractor. Parts of the Frank Verity designed exterior remain visible on the West side.

It opened on 8 November 1928 with the silent film Trelawny of the Wells, based on the play by Arthur Wing Pinero.

Built as an American-style movie palace in the form of North American theatres designed by Thomas Lamb for Loew's/MGM, it had a capacity of about 3,300 seats, and was one of the first cinemas in the UK to be fully air-conditioned. It also boasted a 4/21 Wurlitzer organ, and a large stage which often hosted ballet and dance performances.

Soon after opening, MGM bought out Joel's interest in the theatre.

==== Post-war cine-variety ====
After the war, the stage accommodated programmes of cine-variety–elaborate live shows, similar to those presented at the Radio City Music Hall. For these, the American producer Nat Carlson, who had been responsible for shows at that venue, was hired, and its slogan, "The Showplace of the Nation," was adopted.

In 1952 the Empire featured in Charlie Chaplin's film Limelight, and its 1927 incarnation can also be seen in archived newsreel footage of special events.

==== New screen for Ben-Hur 70mm presentation ====
There were reports that the cinema was to be demolished and MGM received offers to sell but in 1959, the Empire removed 1,200 seats and installed new 70mm projectors and a new screen in front of the proscenium to show Ben-Hur, which ran for 76 weeks.

=== 1962: Reconstruction as a cinema and dance hall ===
Following the long run of Ben-Hur, in 1961 the Empire was sold to Mecca and closed for internal reconstruction to create a new cinema for MGM and a dance hall for Mecca. The building was stripped out extensively, including the removal of existing partition walls and floors. Almost all of the 1920s ornate plasterwork was removed; two small sections remained, hidden behind false walls and ceilings—one section now being behind the IMAX auditorium side wall.

George Coles was the architect and G. E. Wallis and Sons was the main contractor for the new cinema.

The theatre reopened on 19 December 1962, with Jumbo. A new 1,330-seat auditorium was formed at circle level, on a suspended precast concrete floor over the former stalls underneath, with a circle section at the rear on a new stadium seating structure, and a flatter raked stalls section towards the screen end; the auditorium had no stage facilities, and extended into the former stage house. Its side walls and ceiling were finished with acoustic plaster tiles of mink and gold colours, featured banks of concealed colour-changing cold cathode lighting, and reclining red upholstered seating was fitted.

The auditorium would later be known as Empire 1 or Screen 1.

The vestibule was subdivided with the cinema entrance on the left side, with a single staircase up to the grand foyer, its walls covered with white and black Italian marble, and a new grand foyer replaced the circle foyer, featuring a red coloured ceiling with several domes, lit with white concealed lighting.

In the former stalls, a Mecca Ballroom was constructed, with access from Leicester Square via the right half of the former cinema vestibule and stairs down to its sub-basement level. Over the years, it has been a dance hall, discothèque and nightclub, being later operated by First Leisure Corporation plc, and in 1992 it was reimagined as the Equinox Discothèque. In 2007, following further substantial reconstruction and refurbishment, it re-opened as the Casino at the Empire, which is now operated by Metropolitan Gaming, owned by Silver Point Capital.

The 1928 façade was retained but was now completely obscured by a full building hoarding advertising the current films featured and Mecca Dancing; it was not until 1989 that it was re-exposed, with a new canopy built featuring rows of semi-circular neon lights, which was subsequently altered and then completely replaced when the Casino was opened.

=== 1989: Refurbishment ===
In 1989, Screen 1 and the lobby areas were refurbished, with Esquisse Design as the architects. Fibre optic starfields by Par Opti Projects Ltd were fitted in the foyer ceiling and in the curved proscenium arch-style flat plasterwork above the screen, and a THX-certified sound system was installed by CSI, which later became Bell Theatre Services Ltd.

This consisted of 5 JBL 4675C systems with dual 4648A LF cabinets (four 15" drivers per channel), six JBL 4645 subwoofers, and 20 JBL 8330 surrounds, powered by 13 JBL/UREI dual-monoblock 6290 power amplifiers, fed from a Dolby CP200 with a THX 3417 crossover/booth monitor.

The refurbishment included the application of grey spray paint to the tiles in Screen 1, which had the unintended consequence of negatively impacting the auditorium's acoustics. The red foyer ceilings now had a flocked finish, a 40-screen video wall was installed in the foyer, and new decorative treatments in lobby areas included mirrored finishes and exposed cold cathode lighting features. The HVAC system was upgraded with a new rooftop chiller unit.

A laser projector was also installed in Empire 1, for a short sound-and-light show; the projection was onto the tabs and walls, and the concealed lighting was sequenced. It preceded the start of each programme, proclaiming it to be "The Most Spectacular Cinema in the World," and advertised the THX certified sound system.

Dolby SR-D was fitted in 1992 by adding a Dolby DA10 and CAT699 soundtrack readers; a year later, a DTS-6 system was added for the release of Jurassic Park, and an SDDS system was also installed.

By the mid-1990s, the laser show was discontinued; some years later, Martin Audio speakers were installed, and THX recertification was eventually dropped.

== Ownership changes ==
The Empire was operated for many years by Cinema International Corporation, until it merged in 1989 with United Artists Communications Inc. to form UCI Cinemas. In 2004, UCI Cinemas merged with Odeon Cinemas to form the Odeon & UCI Cinemas Group; the Office of Fair Trading required the disposal of ten former UCI sites, including the Empire Leicester Square, which in October 2005 were sold to Empire Cinemas Ltd. The Empire Leicester Square was subsequently acquired by Cineworld in July 2016, and the cinema is now known as Cineworld Leicester Square.

== 21st century technical upgrades to Screen 1 ==
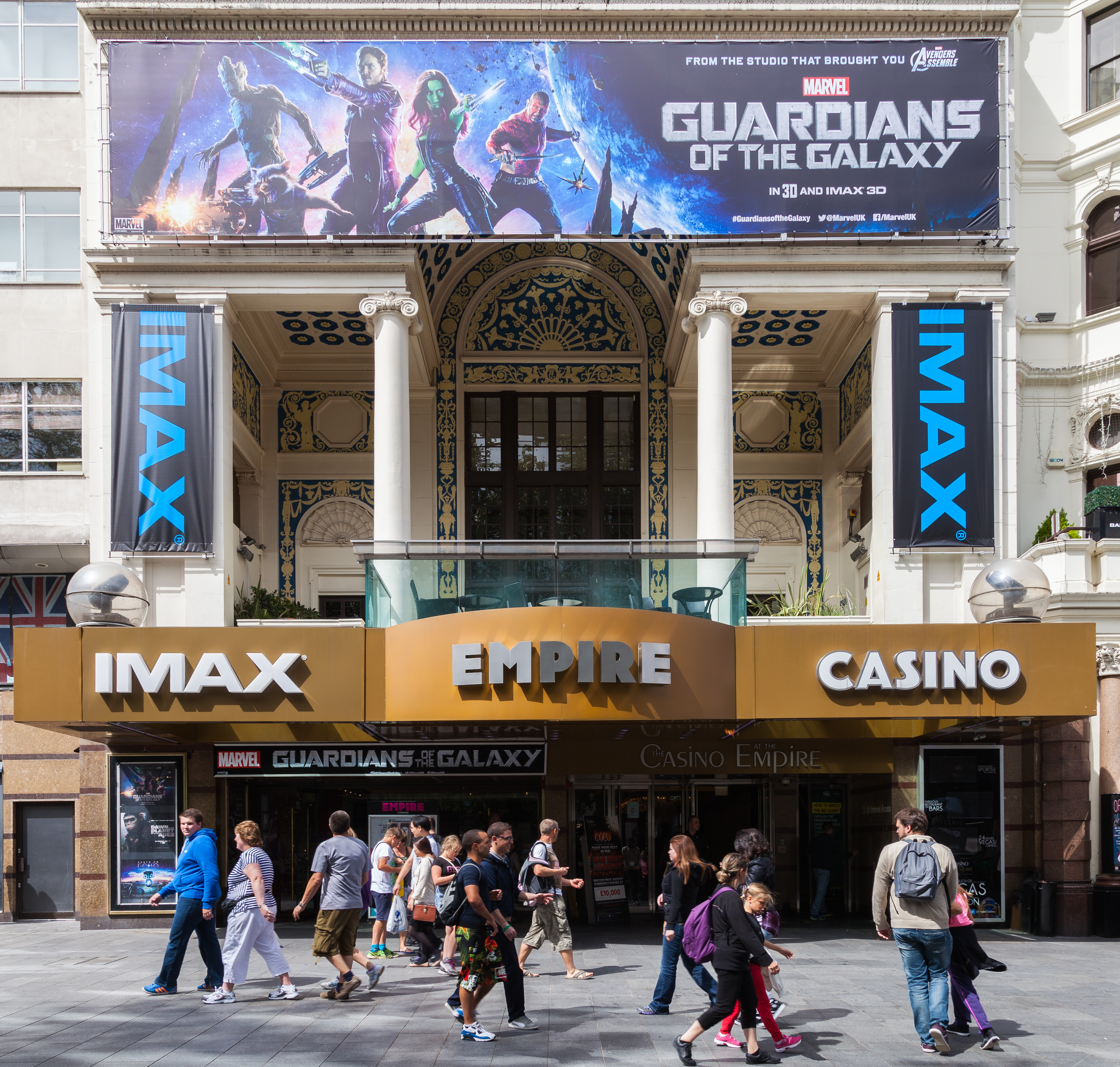
Empire in 2014

=== Reinstatement of THX certification ===
Following Empire Cinemas' acquisition, in 2006 the THX certification of Screen 1 was reinstated. The sound system was completely replaced by Bell Theatre Services Ltd, using 5 JBL 5632 Custom ScreenArray screen speakers, each with dual 18" drivers, and 16 18" JBL 4645C subwoofers, all flush with a new baffle wall built by Camstage; a rear array comprising 42 JBL 8340A surround speakers, 5 dbx DriveRack 4800 digital active crossovers, and 56 kW of Crown CTs series amplification.

CTs 2000 and 3000s were placed in racks behind the screen to ensure loudspeaker cable runs were short, and the surrounds were individually powered by 6 CTs 8200 8-channel amplifiers located in the booth.

The SDDS D2000, DTS-6Ds, Dolby CP200 and MPU-1 were serviced or refurbished and one Philips DP70 was recommissioned in order to run 70mm screenings; and were tested with Reel 1 of Dune. A Dolby CP650 was added to handle digital sources, being fitted with a CAT778 allowing AES/EBU outputs to the dbx crossovers, and was switchable to analogue for the CP200.

To help tame the auditorium's acoustics, RPG Reapor sintered glass tiles were applied over the existing tiles.

The screen was also replaced by one 4 metres (13 ft) wider, measuring 18.2 by 7.68 metres (59.7 ft × 25.2 ft). Film projection lenses were changed to variable-iris aspheric technology Schneider Cinelux Premières, allowing light balance centre-to-edge with improved focus and illumination uniformity.

=== Dolby 3D projection and Dolby Atmos ===
In May 2009, Screen 1 was equipped for the world debut of Avatar with the UK's first Dolby 3D large screen system, using 4 Barco DP3000 projectors in a dual-stacked configuration.

The UK's first public Dolby Atmos system was installed in Screen 1 in July 2012. 14 overhead speakers (JBL AM7212 and AM7215) were installed, hanging down through holes in the ceiling, but covered over with grey fabric, and additional front side speakers and rear subwoofers were added.

== IMAX conversion of Screen 1 ==
In August 2013, Screen 1 was closed for a total refurbishment, to form a 723-seat IMAX auditorium and a 401-seat IMPACT auditorium (renamed Superscreen following the Cineworld acquisition.) The final screening, Big Bad Wolves, occurred on 26 August 2013 to close out FrightFest 2013, and building work commenced immediately afterwards.

The architect for the conversion was UNICK Architects, with Maeve Contractors as the main contractor.

The project involved the permanent removal of almost all existing decorative finishes and fittings, the demolition of all false ceilings, and some internal walls. A large acoustic wall was constructed, weighing 50 tonnes and hung from the 1920s roof structure, for isolation between the two auditoria.

The IMPACT (Superscreen) screen opened on 16 May 2014 with Pompeii, and the IMAX screen on 30 May 2014 with Edge of Tomorrow. Following the redevelopment of Screen 1, the cinema had digital projection only, with no film projection capability available.

=== IMAX auditorium ===
The IMAX auditorium uses the circle seating area of the former Screen 1, with its steep raking, and is the largest IMAX in the UK by seating capacity. It also has the widest cinema screen in the UK, 26.5m (87.5 feet) wide by 15.6m (51.1 feet) high; it is curved and is positioned in the former middle stalls of Empire 1. Its walls and ceilings retain essentially the same form, but with the ceiling progressively raised, reusing the 1962 curved steelwork moved up to accommodate the IMAX screen height, and altered with the front splay walls moved in. The walls and ceiling are covered with black stretched fabric over acoustic absorption, and the colour-changing concealed lighting has been reinstated using LEDs. Its seating is upholstered in black leather.

At opening, two IMAX DLP xenon light source projectors were used, which could only achieve a 24.5m (~80 feet) wide by ~13m (~42.5 feet) high image. A full set of IMAX "Kanga" Grand Theatre speakers were installed, supporting all 6 channels then available including upper centre.

In October 2015, the IMAX laser light source projection system (IMAX with Laser) was installed, allowing the full screen to be filled, alongside an upgrade to IMAX's 12-channel surround sound system, for which 6 additional overhead and side surround speakers were added.

=== Superscreen auditorium ===
The remaining area of the former Screen 1, combined with the former void area to the external wall on Leicester Place, is used for the Superscreen auditorium, which bears no resemblance in design to the former Screen 1. Its 20.5m (~67 feet) wide by 11m (~36 feet) high wall-to-wall floating screen is oriented in the opposite direction, back to back with the IMAX screen. A new stadium seating structure was constructed, and at the rear of the auditorium, on a new 17m long steel girder supported by the existing roof structure, sits a small balcony seating area, under which a small projection booth is situated.

Dolby Atmos was installed, along with a total of 87 JBL speakers powered by 85 kW of amplification. Most of the projection and sound equipment, including twin Barco DP4K-32B projectors, JBL screen speakers, Crown amplifiers, and dbx loudspeaker management units, as detailed above, was transferred from the former Screen 1, except that all surround and overhead speakers were replaced.

In November 2024, HDR by Barco capability was added, with the installation of a Barco LS4K laser light steering projector, as well as a new Harkness Hugo screen.

== History of other auditoria (Pre-Cineworld acquisition) ==
=== Screen 2 ===
Formerly the Ritz, a cinema located in the basement of an adjacent building (1–4 Leicester Square) that opened in 1937, which was originally designed as a newsreel cinema, the architect being George Coles. It was acquired by MGM for the distribution of feature films, and later renamed Empire 2. It has been refurbished several times, notably in 1970 with Sidney Kaye, Eric Firmin and Partners as the architects, and revamped in the 2000s with the addition of a new stadium seating structure.

A separate entrance was retained until the mid-1980s, subsequent to which access has been via the main cinema foyer level, by entering into a stairwell leading down to the auditorium.

=== Screens 4 and 5 ===
These two screens were added in 2008, the first to open with digital projection only in London's West End, built in areas formerly used as toilets and offices, respectively seating 96 and 50. Barco DP1500 projectors, Harkness screens, Crown amplifiers, JBL screen speakers and Martin Audio surround speakers, alongside reclining memory foam seating, were installed.

=== Screens 7 and 8 ===
Opening on 29 November 1985, a 77-seat auditorium known as Empire 3 was constructed. Following its closure in 2009, its space combined with former void space, above the lower vestibule, was used to form Screens 7 and 8.

=== Screens 6 and 9 ===
Screen 6 was built as the smallest auditorium, with 26 seats; and Screen 9, above Screen 8, was built within former offices.

== Post-Cineworld acquisition developments ==
In 2018, Cineworld completed a total refurbishment of the lobby areas, and the former Screen 2 was converted to a 4DX screen.

=== Foyer refurbishment ===
The new foyer was designed by Innebo Architects, with Chapman Taylor as the architect for the project's delivery.

It involved the replacement of all ceilings and the permanent removal of almost all decorative features, many of which dated from numerous changes made since the 1962 reconstruction and also the 1989 refurbishment. Of particular note, the original white marble vestibule wall finishes and the red coloured ceilings with domed features were not reinstated; however, the brass balustrading in the vestibule area was refitted.

The vestibule stairs now feature LED display modules fitted on their risers, and a large curved display formed from LED display modules is situated at the top of the vestibule. Reflective black stretched fabric has been attached to the ceilings, which are heavily accented with decorative features, consisting of coved elements and flat gold coloured squares, lit using much concealed and back LED lighting.

=== 4DX conversion of the former Screen 2 ===
The former Screen 2 was converted to a 4DX auditorium, with Chapman Taylor's leisure team as the architect. The auditorium was altered to allow for the 4DX installation; all internal finishes were replaced, and the seating, now with a capacity of 136, was fitted to a new stadium stepping, with wider row spacing.

=== Screen renumbering ===
Concurrent to the lobby areas refurbishment, the screens were renumbered; Screens 5, 4, and 6 are now Screens 1, 2 and 3 respectively, and Screens 7–9 are now Screens 5–7. The 4DX, IMAX and Superscreen auditoriums—4, 8 and 9 respectively—are normally referenced by name.

=== Refurbishment of other screens ===
Screens 1–3 and 5–7 (formerly 5, 4, 6 and 7–9) were reopened in Summer 2018, following refurbishment, which included replacement seating, all (except Screen 3) on a steeper rake.

== References and notes ==
- Guide to British Theatres 1750–1950, John Earl and Michael Sell pp. 109–10 (Theatres Trust, 2000) ISBN 0-7136-5688-3
