= Goffredo Alessandrini =

Italian scriptwriter and film director

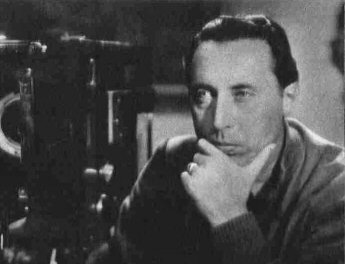
- Born: 20 November 1904; Cairo, Khedivate of Egypt
- Died: 16 May 1978 (aged 73); Rome, Italy
- Spouse: Anna Magnani (m. 1935; div. 1950)

Goffredo Alessandrini (20 November 1904 – 16 May 1978) was an Italian scriptwriter and film director. He also acted, edited, and produced some films.

He practiced athletics in his youth, and won a title of Italian champion on 110 meters hurdles in 1925.

== Biography ==
He started in films collaborating with Alessandro Blasetti and was one of the most important film directors under Italian Fascism. His films received several awards at the Venice Film Festival during the Fascist era: the Mussolini Cup for Best Italian film in 1938, for Luciano Serra pilota, and in 1939 for Abuna Messias. He received the Biennale Award in 1942, for Noi Vivi and Addio Kira!

His most remembered and important works are two anti-Communist films (combined to comprise 4 hours), both based on Ayn Rand's We the Living. Without Rand's permission, We the Living was made into a pair of films, Noi vivi and Addio, Kira in 1942, by Scalara Films, Rome. This was despite resistance from the Italian government under Mussolini. These films were eventually pulled from theatres as the Italian and German governments, which abhorred Communism, discovered that the stories also contained an anti-Fascist message. These films were re-edited into a new version which was approved by Rand and re-released as We the Living in 1986. The original two films, which in combination ran more than four hours, were cut into a single, 3-hour film.

He made two films in Argentina in the early 1960s.

He was married to Anna Magnani from 1935 until 1950.

== Filmography ==
=== Director ===
- 1928 : Sole e terra madre
- 1929 : Diga di Maghmod
- 1931 : The Private Secretary
- 1934 : Seconda B
- 1935 : Don Bosco
- 1936 : Cavalry
- 1936 : A Woman Between Two Worlds
- 1938 : Luciano Serra, Pilot
- 1939 : The Widow
- 1939 : Cardinal Messias
- 1940 : Bridge of Glass
- 1941 : Caravaggio, il pittore maledetto
- 1941 : Blood Wedding
- 1942 : Giarabub
- 1942 : Noi vivi
- 1942 : Addio Kira!
- 1945 : Chi l'ha visto?
- 1945 : Lettere al sottotenente
- 1947 : Fury
- 1948 : L'Ebreo errante
- 1950 : Amina
- 1950 : Rapture (Sangue sul sagrato)
- 1952 : Red Shirts
- 1953: The Daughter of the Regiment
- 1954 : Public Opinion
- 1957 : Desert Warrior (Los amantes del desierto) with Ricardo Montalbán
- 1962 : Rumbos malditos
- 1962 : Mate Cosido
- 1986 : We the Living AKA Ayn Rand's We the Living

=== Script writer ===
- 1931 : Mother Earth
- 1931 : The Private Secretary
- 1935 : Don Bosco
- 1938 : Luciano Serra pilota
- 1939 : La Vedova
- 1941 : Caravaggio, il pittore maledetto
- 1941 : Nozze di sangue
- 1942 : Noi vivi
- 1942 : Addio Kira!
- 1945 : Lettere al sottotenente
- 1947 : Furia
- 1948 : L'Ebreo errante
- 1986 : We the Living

=== Actor ===
- 1950 : Sangue sul sagrato : Renato
- 1965 : I Tre volti : Direttore dell'agenzia (segment "Latin Lover")
- 1965 : La Celestina P… R... : Montesti

=== Producer ===
- 1953 : Opinione pubblica

=== Editor ===
- 1931 : La Segretaria privata
