= Tales of the Typewriter =

- Hungarian: Mesék az írógépröl
- Directed by: Alexander Korda
- Written by: Alexander Korda
- Based on: Tales of the Typewriter by István Szomaházy
- Starring: Lili Berky; Jenő Janovics; György Kürthy
- Cinematography: Arpad Viragh
- Production company: Corvin Film
- Release date: 1916
- Country: Hungary
- Languages: Silent; Hungarian intertitles

Tales of the Typewriter (Hungarian: Mesék az írógépröl) is a 1916 Hungarian silent drama film directed by Alexander Korda and starring Lili Berky, Jenő Janovics and György Kürthy. It was based on a 1905 novel by István Szomaházy.

== Cast ==
- Lili Berky as Vilma Lehmann, bank typist
- Jenő Janovics as Bank manager
- György Kürthy
- László Betegh
- Mihály Bérczy
- Margit Erdei
- Ilonka Gazda
- Rezsö Harsányi
- Ilona Jakabffy
- József Berky
- Aranka Laczkó
- Vilmos Lengyel
- Gyula Szendrő
- Ilonka Székely
- Ferenc Ujvári
