= The Private Secretary (1953 film) =

1953 film

- Directed by: Paul Martin
- Written by: Ernst Nebhut; Just Scheu
- Produced by: Artur Brauner
- Starring: Sonja Ziemann; Rudolf Prack; Paul Hörbiger
- Cinematography: Albert Benitz
- Edited by: Martha Dübber
- Music by: Paul Abraham; Friedrich Schröder
- Production company: CCC Film
- Distributed by: Gloria Film
- Release date: 17 December 1953
- Running time: 95 minutes
- Country: West Germany
- Language: German

The Private Secretary (German: Die Privatsekretärin) is a 1953 West German comedy film directed by Paul Martin and starring Sonja Ziemann, Rudolf Prack and Paul Hörbiger. It was a remake of the 1931 German film The Private Secretary. The director Martin had worked on the earlier film as editor. It was shot at the Wandsbek Studios and on location in Hamburg. The film's sets were designed by Hermann Warm and Alfons Windau.

== Cast ==
- Sonja Ziemann as Gerda Weber
- Rudolf Prack as Direktor Erich Delbrück
- Paul Hörbiger as Portier Julius
- Werner Fuetterer as Ostermann
- Gerty Godden as Fräulein Petzold
- Margaret Cargill as Fräulein Hartmann
- Else Reval as Pensionsinhaberin Schott
- Ruth Stephan as Lissy

== Bibliography ==
- Bock, Hans-Michael & Bergfelder, Tim. The Concise CineGraph. Encyclopedia of German Cinema. Berghahn Books, 2009.
