= Helene Willfüer, Student of Chemistry =

Helene Willfüer, Student of Chemistry (German: Stud. chem. Helene Willfüer) may refer to:

- Helene Willfüer, Student of Chemistry (novel), a 1928 novel by Austrian writer Vicki Baum
- Helene Willfüer, Student of Chemistry (film), a 1930 German film adaptation directed by Fred Sauer
- Hélène (film), a 1936 French film adaptation directed by Jean Benoît-Lévy
- Studentin Helene Willfüer, a 1956 West German film adaptation directed by Rudolf Jugert
