= Roland Caillaux =

French actor (1905–1977)

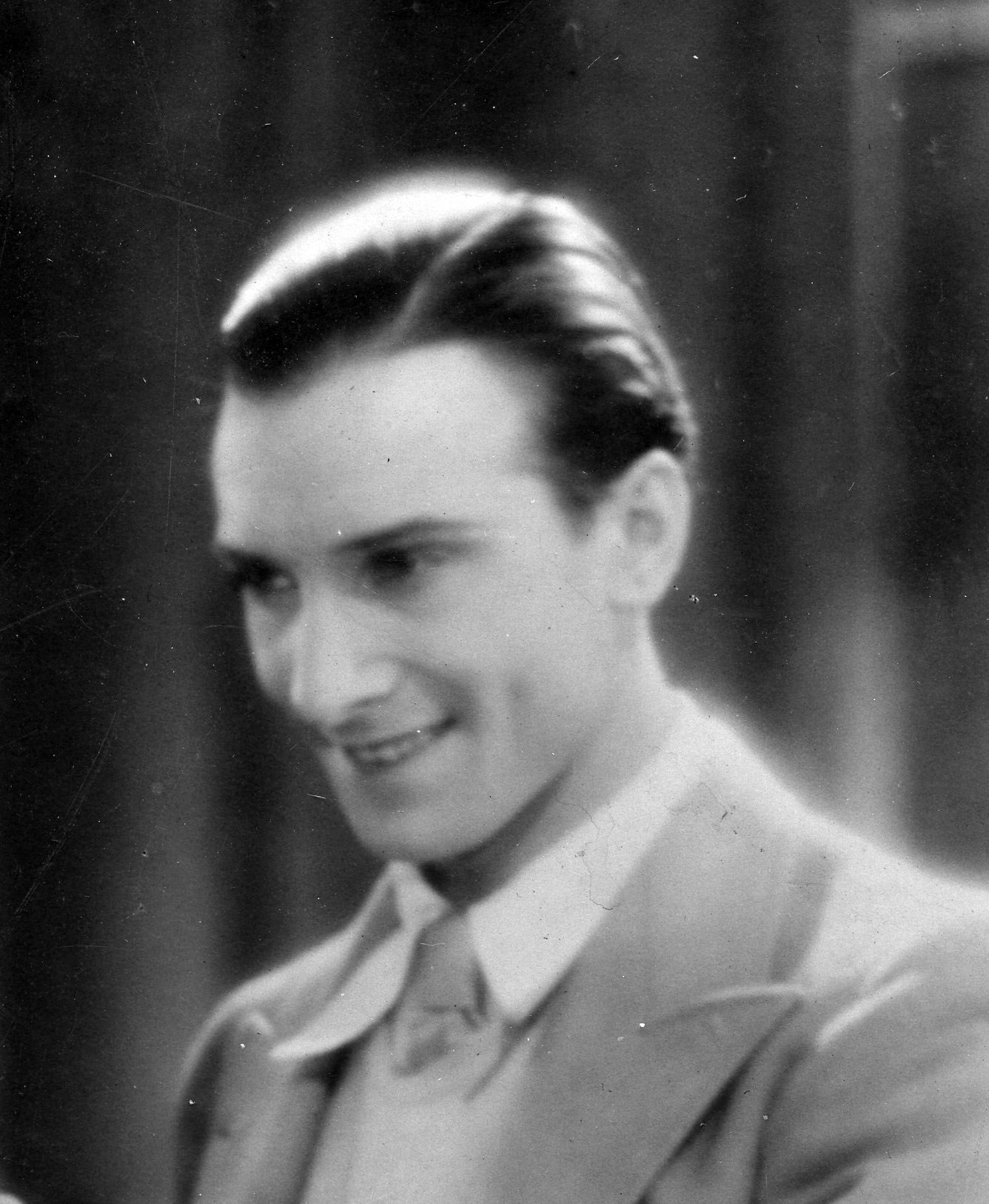
- Born: Roland Raymond Ferdinand Caillaud; January 5, 1905
- Died: December 3, 1977 (aged 72)
- Other names: Roland Caillaux; Roland Caipland
- Occupations: Actor, artist

Roland Raymond Ferdinand Caillaud (January 5, 1905 – December 3, 1977) – known professionally as Roland Caillaux, and sometimes using the pseudonym Roland Caipland – was a French actor and artist. He is known for acting in several French films in the 1920s and 1930s, and for producing and publishing homoerotic illustrations in the mid 20th century.

== Art ==
Caillaux has long been best known for illustrating 20 lithographies pour un livre que j'ai lu (20 lithographs for a book I read), which accompanied a text attributed to Jean Genet with images of male homosexuality, including explicit sexual activity. The book was published in April 1945, without the name of the author, the publisher or place of publication, with a print run of only 115 copies.

In this text, there are excerpts, however variants, of Notre-Dame-des-Fleurs and The Parade, poems published by Marc Barbezat in 1948 in a collection entitled Poems and signed this once Jean Genet (Editions L'Arbalète).

Roland Caillaud's studio was located on Rue Boulard in the 14th arrondissement of Paris; it is there, between 1944 and 1945, that Jean Genet met the painter through model Édouard Dermit.

Nicole Canet, who has rediscovered many of Caillaud's drawings, reports that he inherited money from his parents and lived as an annuitant after having been an actor. He lived at 5 rue de l'Ancienne Comédie. In a memoir, François Sentein says that when he traveled by bicycle to Montpensier street where Jean Cocteau lived, he kept his bicycle pump in his hand, for fear of it being stolen.

== Acting ==
Under the name Roland Caillaux, he appeared in the following films:

- 1924 : La Galerie des monstres by Jaque Catelain
- 1928 : Tire-au-flanc by Jean Renoir : the sergeant
- 1929 : Figaro by Tony Lekain and Gaston Ravel : Grippe-Soleil
- 1929 : Le Ruisseau by René Hervil
- 1930 : Soyons gais by Arthur Robison : Bruce
- 1930 : Le masque d'Hollywood by Clarence G. Badger and John Daumery : Bing
- 1932 : Baroud by Rex Ingram and Alice Terry : André Duval, a sergeant of Spahis
- 1932 : That Scoundrel Morin by Georges Lacombe
- 1934 : Itto by Jean Benoît-Lévy and Marie Epstein : Lieutenant Jean Dumontier

He performed in the following stage plays:

- 1929: La rouille by Vladimir Kirchon and Andreï Ouspenski, Théâtre de l'Avenue
- 1930 : Juliette ou La clé des songes by Georges Neveux, Théâtre de l'Avenue
- 1930 : La Passion by Edmond Haraucourt, Comédie-Française

== Paintings, drawings, illustrations ==
- Raymond Voinquel en costume de marin, 30 x 23 cm, 1931
- Portrait de Christian Bérard dans l'atelier, 22 x 18 cm, 1937
- Gentilhomme de la Renaissance, aquarelle, 64 x 48 cm, 1937
- Jeune Femme à l’orientale, 72 x 50 cm, 1938
- Femme du désert, huile, 114 x 87 cm, 1939
- Village en bord de mer, huile, 54 x 81 cm, 1943
- Portrait d’adolescent, mine de plomb, 46 x 31 cm, 1944
- [frontispice] Mademoiselle de Murville de Roger Peyrefitte, éditions Jean Vigneau, 1947
- Le Pot ancien, huile, 81 x 65 cm, s.d.
- Verlaine et Rimbaud, fusain, 31 x 24 cm, s.d.

Some drawings seem to have been signed by the pseudonym Roland Caipland

Exposure(s)

- 1933, Paris, Galerie des Quatre-Chemins
