= Roger Toziny =

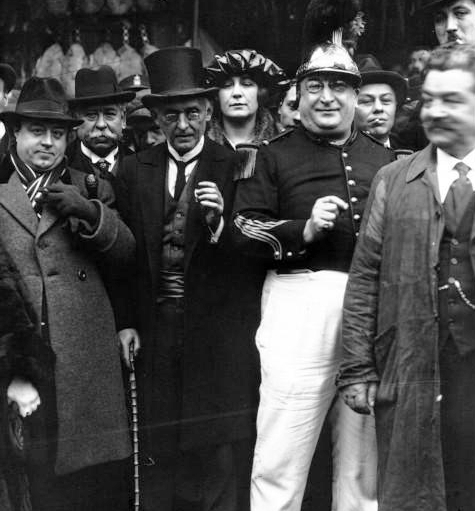
- On the far left, Roger Toziny with a striped scarf, accompanying Jules Depaquit (center) with a bamboo cane
- Born: Henri Roger Sosthène Pierre Tauzin; 24 December 1883; Blaye
- Died: 3 March 1939 (aged 55); 10th arrondissement of Paris
- Occupation(s): Chansonnier; Lyricist

Roger Toziny (24 December 1883 – 3 March 1939) was a 20th-century French chansonnier, lyricist and actor.

== Biography ==
On 18 May 1917, released from military service, Roger Toziny joined in Paris with another chansonnier, Maurice Hallé, and a cartoonist, Jules Depaquit, to create a satirical four pages weekly entitled La Vache enragée, taking the name of a former carnival parade. With his two friends, he also participated in the creation of the free commune of Montmartre in April 1920.

In February 1921, Roger Toziny and Maurice Hallet founded a new cabaret in Montmartre, at 4 place Constantin-Pecqueur, and gave it the name of their review, La Vache enragée. There he met Pierre Dac, alias André Isaac, who he managed to convince, despite his shyness, to perform on stage, and for who he found his pseudonym "Dac". Other artists made their debut in the venue such as Raymond Souplex or Léo Malet. On 17 April 1921, Roger Toziny also organized the first "scabs fair" to help the needy painters.

When Jules Depaquit died in 1924, he succeeded him as mayor of the "free commune of Montmartre". He later became the boss of another cabaret, Le Caveau des oubliettes rouges, still in Montmartre.

During the 1930s, he played an actor in films, in particular in a feature film by Marie Epstein and Jean Benoît-Lévy Hélène. He is also the author of a collection of old songs of France, entitled Absence or Les chansons de mon âme.

== Works ==
- À l'heure la plus douce, plaquette de vers, illustrations by Germain Delatousche, 1921
- Montmartre et sa commune libre, photographs by Maurice Chabas, Éditions la Vache enragée, 1934
- De balades en ballades ou Les veillées de Montmartre, edited by Jacqueline Loussert-Toziny, 1990

== Filmography ==
Under the name Toziny:

- 1930: Chiqué by Pierre Colombier with Adrien Lamy
- 1932: Monsieur le docteur (short film) by Pablo Labor, with René-Paul Groffe

Under the name Roger Toziny:

- 1936: Hélène by Jean Benoît-Lévy and Marie Epstein, with Madeleine Renaud, Jean-Louis Barrault, Maurice Baquet

== Bibliography ==
- Guérin, Jean (1957). Des hommes et des activités : autour d'un demi-siecle. Éditions B.E.B. pp. 672–673.
- Jackson, Jeffrey H. (Summer 2006). "Artistic Community and Urban Development in 1920s Montmartre". French Politics, Culture & Society. 24 (2): 1–25. doi:10.3167/153763706780682092. JSTOR 42843444.
- Laut, Noël « Montmartre-Plage », La Rampe, 20 August 1922, p. 43 read online.
- Mellot, Philippe (2008). La vie secrète de Montmartre. Éditions Omnibus.
- Pessis, Jacques (2012). Pierre Dac, mon maître 63. Le Cherche midi. ISBN 978-2-7491-2166-6.
