= List of Maoyu characters =

The following is a list of characters from Maoyu.

== Characters ==
None of the characters in the story have proper names, and each one of them are only being addressed by their title or occupation.

=== Protagonists ===
Mao (魔王, Maō; lit. 'Demon King')
Voiced by: Ami Koshimizu
The main female protagonist and the 43rd supreme ruler of the Demon Realm who holds the title of Demon Queen. (Note: According to the Queen, the title of Demon King (魔王, Maō) stays with her even if she does not like it. Due to the many meanings of Maō (魔王) which includes Devil or Evil King, it is unclear if she dislikes the name because of its masculine title or because it sounds evil.) Even though she looks young, she is in fact over a hundred years old. She wants the best outcome for both sides of the war and sets out for the Human Realm after successfully convincing the Hero to join forces via revealing her plans. She disguises herself as a human noblewoman known as the Crimson Scholar (紅の学士, Kurenai no Gakushi), and shares her vast knowledge on such topics as economics and farming. She comes from a clan of demons that prioritize knowledge. They reside in a hidden dimension called the Outer Library, which contains a vast archive of knowledge from various times and alternate universes. That place is where the Queen gains her range of knowledge.
The Crimson Scholar rapidly grows in popularity for her radical ideas and beauty. She is viewed with distrust by the church and the central kingdoms, who brand her as a heretic. To ensure a temporary ceasefire between the Humans and Demons, the Demon Queen disseminates rumors that her battle with the Hero indeed occurred as expected, resulting in his disappearance and her body becoming severely wounded. This provides her with extra time to complete her plans by leading her servants to believe that she cannot command them until her recuperation is completed.
Though an imposing and intelligent woman, she has shown a bit of a childish and comedic side. To appear more threatening, she wears a headband with a large set of horns. The Demon Queen has always held affections for the Hero and anticipated their meeting from the moment of his birth. One part of becoming the Demon King involves a transfer of emotion and power from the past Demon Kings in the Ancient Royal Tomb. However, the spirits of the past Kings possess her body when she attempts the ritual for a second time, and she is rescued by Hero forcing the spirits out of her body by affirming their vow together.
Yusha (勇者, Yūsha; lit. 'Hero')
Voiced by: Jun Fukuyama
The main male protagonist and the greatest warrior that the Human Realm has. After traveling with his companions, he went out on his own to slay the Demon Queen and bring an end to the conflict between demons and humans. However, he agrees to aid her efforts after she explains that the world needs a peaceful solution for both sides, as both societies are set to collapse further once the war ends. He is an unparalleled swordsman capable of standing against the strongest Human or Demon. He is capable of powerful magic ranging from healing abilities to creating familiar spirits, as well as instantly teleporting to any location he has previously visited. He eventually develops feelings for the Demon Queen, even though she only returns them in an over-the-top fashion.
As part of the Queen's plan, he conceals his true identity and adopts the name of White Swordsman (白の剣士, Shiro no Kenshi) while living in a small village with The Crimson Scholar. While traveling through the Demon Realm as a peacekeeper, he dons an imposing black armor belonging to a former Demon King, addressing himself as a servant of the Queen called the Black Knight (黒騎士, Kuro Kishi). The Hero used to fight alongside three companions, a Female Knight, an Archer and a Wizard who followed their separate ways after the Hero left the party to confront the Demon King by himself.

=== Hero's companions ===
Female Knight (女騎士, Onna Kishi)
Voiced by: Miyuki Sawashiro
One of the members of Hero's old party. A powerful swordswoman who also excels as a commander in battle. After the party is disbanded, she became a nun and Prioress at the Lakeside Convent in Lake nation. She reunites with the Hero by accident much to her surprise, as no one had news from him since he left for the Demon Realm. Despite failing to get a proper explanation from him, she joins the Crimson Scholar's efforts to improve Human society by teaching swordsmanship to her students. Female Knight eventually becomes a close friend to the Crimson Scholar, staying by her side even after learning about her true identity, despite the fact she is also in love with Hero.
Female Magician (女魔法使い, Onna Mahōtsukai)
Voiced by: Misato Fukuen
Another member of the Hero's old party. After the Hero left his party, she sets for the Demon Realm to look for him and no one has heard from her since then. Upon learning of it, the Hero starts looking for clues about her whereabouts during his travels through the Demon Realm. Her adventures in the Demon Realm are told in the manga Maoyū Maō Yūsha Gaiden. Later, she reveals herself as a demon from same clan as the Demon Queen and Chief Maid. She has split personalities, shown as invisible companions in the anime that can only be seen by her but manifest themselves through a change in her tone of voice to others.
In the spin off manga and prequel light novels, it is revealed she was formerly known as the Silver Mage and along with her older sisters, White Mage and Indigo Mage, they were part of an experiment by Mage Association and the Central Church to create an artificial hero. However, the brutal training left many dead with Female Magician being the only survivor after escaping while her sisters spirits inhabit her body, becoming her split personalities.
Elder Archer (老弓兵, Rō-Kyūhei)

Later Butler (執事, Shitsuji)

Voiced by: Banjō Ginga
The third member of Hero's old party. After the party was disbanded, he starts working as a servant of the Winter Prince who later becomes King. He is a lecherous older man who usually treats Hero like a son, while taunting Female Knight for her small bust, much to her anger. He addresses concerns about Hero isolating himself from humanity due to his immense power. His title comes from the fact that he can inflict arrow-like wounds from afar, despite he is never seen carrying a bow or any kind of long range weapon.

=== Winter Pass village ===
Chief Maid (メイド長, Meido Chō)
Voiced by: Chiwa Saitō
Demon Queen's most trusted servant and commander of her army. She usually does not refrain from expressing her point of view even before her master. Despite making unflattering comments to her master, she remains loyal to her master ever since they were children. Like her master, she also comes from the same demon clan that resides in the Outer Library but instead learning about economics, she learns the "Ways of the Maid" from peculiar sources. She can summon Ghost Maids (ゴースト軍団, Meido Gundan; lit. Ghost Maid Corps) to guard the mansion and serve the guests with her.
Little Sister Maid and Big Sister Maid (メイド妹・メイド姉, Meido Imōto, Meido Ane)
Voiced by: Nao Tōyama and Haruka Tomatsu
Two young sisters who took refuge at Crimson Scholar's estate. Coming from a serf family of seven siblings, the sisters' other siblings died from hunger and disease. Due to the harsh life of serfdom which their lord treated them like slaves, they escaped and hope to get a better life at the city. However, Chief Maid looks down on the sisters since their presence would bring trouble with the Crimson Scholar. Furthermore, she considers them "insects" for allowing life harsh realities to control their fate rather than overcoming it and control their own lives as human beings and not thinking and planning their future.
Upon asking the Chief Maid to teach them to become proper humans, they are taken unto her guard, working as assistant maids. Thanks to the education given to them, Big Sister Maid becomes knowledgeable about the different lives and social classes of human society while Little Sister Maid becomes an expert with food and drinks. They learn the truth about Crimson Scholar and Chief Maid's demonic origin just before the beginning of the Kurultai and both accept it without much difficulty, with Big Sister Maid even taking on the disguise of the Crimson Scholar when Demon Queen has to be away.
Noble Youngster (貴族子弟, Kizoku Shitei)
Voiced by: Yūki Kaji
A noble's son and student of Crimson Scholar's, thanks to his connections and knowledge taught to him by his teacher, he becomes a diplomat and spy for the Blizzard Queen. He later joins Young Merchant in his plan to take control of the Merchant Alliance.
Merchant Youngster (商人子弟, Shōnin Shitei)
Voiced by: Takuma Terashima
A merchant's son and a student of Crimson Scholar's, thanks to his new knowledge of economics by his teacher, the Winter King appoints him as the country's finance minister.
Warrior Youngster (軍人子弟, Gunjin Shitei)
Voiced by: Tatsuhisa Suzuki
A warrior's son and a student of Crimson Scholar's. He originally was hot-blooded and very supportive in the human/demon war but later changes his view due to his teacher and Female Knight who taught him about the effects of the war. When the Central nations began attacking the Southern kingdoms, he later becomes a commander in the Southern kingdom armies where he and his men thwarted a surprise attack by the White Nation using tactics and traps he learn from his teacher.
Builder Youngster (土木子弟, Doboku Shitei)
A muscular young builder and engineer demon boy living in Gateway Fortress after some time educated by Crimson Scholar. He is later entrusted to build the bridge through the hole linking human world and demon world.
Minstrel Youngster (奏楽子弟, Sōga Shitei)
An young minstrel elf-like demon girl living in Gateway Fortress after some time educated by Crimson Scholar. She later travels with the Elder Sister Maid to the Holy Kingdom's library.

=== Southern kingdoms ===
Winter King (The Second) (冬寂王, Tōjaku-ō)

Formerly Winter Prince (冬の王子, Fuyu-no-Ōji)

Voiced by: Daisuke Hirakawa
The current regent of the Winter Kingdom. Before his coronation, the Winter Prince wished for his country and the other Southern kingdoms to be free from the Central kingdoms who economically controls their nations by giving them financial aid in exchange for continuing fighting the demons. Knowing such aid is unreliable and cannot last forever, he was grateful for the Crimson Scholar in helping his nation prosper to be economically independent from Central. After his father was killed during the first disastrous expedition to reclaim Aurora Island, he assumed the throne to become the new Winter King and appointed Female Knight as the new Commander of the second expedition to reclaim the island. Thanks to her, Crimson Scholar and Hero, Aurora Island is reclaimed from the demons. To further help the South, he forms an economic pact with the Iron and Ice Kingdoms. After the Central Kingdoms and church brands Crimson Scholar a heretic in an attempt to stop the South from becoming economically independent, the Winter King offers his support and protection to her and stand up against the Central.
Winter King (The First) (冬寂王, Tōjaku-Ō)
Voiced by: Toshiyuki Morikawa
The original Winter King, he was killed by South Arctic General during the failed Aurora Island Expedition in order to buy time for the survivors to escape.
Blizzard Queen (氷雪の女王, Hyōsetsu-no-Joō)
Voiced by: Mariko Fujii
Queen of the Ice Kingdom.
Iron Fist King (鉄腕王, Tetsuwan-Ō)
Voiced by: Masanori Machida
King of the Iron Kingdom.
White Night King (白夜王, Byakuya-Ō)
Voiced by: Hiroki Touchi
King of the White Night Kingdom. Unlike his Southern counterparts, which end up adopting the improvements offered by Crimson Scholar, he chooses to align with the Central kingdoms instead. Arrogant and uncaring, he refuse to take responsibility when his attempt to reclaim Aurora Island fails which led to many deaths, including the first Winter King who he tries to blame on his failure. After the rest of the Southern leaders call out on his behavior, he gives command of the next Aurora Island expedition to the new Winter King to see if he can do better but much to his anger, the Winter King succeeds in what he failed to do. With his kingdom being left out the economic pact between the Winter, Ice and Iron kingdoms, White Night King becomes jealous and swears revenge on the other Southern nations.
One-eyed Commander (片目司令官, Katame Shireikan)
Voiced by: Hōchū Ōtsuka
The former Commander of the Crusaders that controlled Gateway city and leader of White Night Kingdom's army. Under his rule, his Crusaders treated the demons harshly. As he and his Crusaders lost their sanity and morale due to the Black Knight and his allies' illusion magic, his army abandoned the city with the excuse that he was helping to reclaim Aurora Island. Unfortunately, he and his Crusaders were met by the demon armies who had controlled Aurora Island and were forced to retreat due to the Winter Kingdom forces. After a brutal battle, his whole army was wiped out, though the Commander himself was able to escape back to the Central Kingdoms. Nevertheless, he was arrested and sentenced to death by the Central Church for abandoning Gateway City and his crushing defeat at the hands of the demons. Later on he is secretly freed by his uncle, the White Night King, but not before losing one of his eyes to rats. He then joined his uncle's plan against the South. At the beginning of the war between Central and South, he led a cavalry surprise attack at the Iron Kingdom, only to be defeated by Warrior Youngster's forces. Escaping death again, he sneaked into Iron Kingdom's capital to murder Crimson Scholar who he blamed for all the bad things that happened to him. He attacks Big Sister Maid, who was disguised as the Scholar, but is confronted by the Warrior Youngster. After a fierce duel, the former Commander is killed, but not before cursing his enemies and predicting their downfall.

=== Merchants Alliance ===
Young Merchant (青年商人, Seinen Shōnin)
Voiced by: Hiroshi Kamiya
A cunning business entrepreneur who views the Crimson Scholar's exploits as a means to expand his fortune. Eventually he learns from Hero about his and Demon Queen's plan and agrees to help them while taking the opportunity to further line his pockets. However, he has genuine feelings for the Crimson scholar which arose from their first encounter due to her intelligence, beauty, and shrewdness and even proposed to her, though learns and understands that the Hero holds a special place in her heart.
Shrewd Treasurer (辣腕会計, Ratsuwan Kaikei)
Voiced by: Shinnosuke Tachibana
The Young Merchant's assistant.
Old Merchant (中年商人, Chūnen Shōnin)
Voiced by: Chō
Young Merchant's mentor.

=== Central kingdoms ===
Emissary (使者, Shisha)
Voiced by: Issei Futamata
Royal Prince Marshall (王弟元帥, Ōtei Gensui)
The younger brother of the King of the Holy Kingdom.
Pope (大主教, Daikyōshū; lit. Archbishop)
Voiced by: Mugihito
The newly elected Pope of the Central Church after Aurora island is reclaimed from the Demons. He is a fanatic with deep hatred against demons.

=== Demon realm ===
Fairy Queen (妖精女王, Yōsei-Joō)
Leader of the Fairy Clan.
Winged Fairy (羽妖精, Hane-yōsei)
Voiced by: Kaoru Mizuhara
One of Hero's allies in the Demon Realm. After Hero's helps rescue her Queen from the Wolf Clan, she and her fellow faeries assist Hero to reclaim Gateway City from the human Crusaders.
Archduke Fire Dragon (火竜大公, Karyū Taikō)
Voiced by: Masashi Hirose
Leader of the Fire Dragon clan. The Archduke is a proud warrior and a war hawk who wants to reclaim Gateway city, seeing the humans continuing control of the city as an insult to the demons and their honor. However, he is convinced to let the Black Knight reclaim the city after the latter promises the city will be returned to the demons with no bloodshed.
Grand Princess Fire Dragon (火竜公女, Karyū Kōjo)
Voiced by: Shizuka Itō
Archduke Fire Dragon's daughter who is offered to Black Knight/Hero as his wife or mistress if he manages to reclaim Gateway city. After the city is reclaimed, she becomes a member of the city's ruling council.

==== Gateway City ====
East Fortress General (東の砦将, Higashi-no-Saishō)
Voiced by: Kenta Miyake
A mercenary general who controls the Eastern Fortress of Gateway City. Unlike the Crusaders, he and his men treat the demons of Gateway city well. When the Commander of the Crusaders abandons the city, the General refuses to join him to protect the humans living there. Knowing he and his men don't have the numbers the fight the demon army, he peacefully surrenders to the Black Knight and forms a power sharing government between the city's humans and demons influential leaders.
Lieutenant General (副官, Fukukan)
Voiced by: Wataru Hatano
The East Fortress General's second in command.
Demon Girl (魔族娘, Mazoku-otome)
Voiced by: Eriko Matsui

==== Blue Demon clan ====
Blue Demon King (蒼魔王, Sōma-Ō)
The leader of the Blue Demon Clan who is working in cahoots with the Central Nations of the Human World and the church to take advantage of the war to strengthen their positions.
Blue Demon Seal King (蒼魔の刻印王, Sōma-no-Kokuin-Ō)

Formerly Seal Blue Demon Prince (刻印の蒼魔王子, Kokuin-no-Sōma-Ōji)

Voiced by: Tetsuya Kakihara
Blue Demon Lord's son whose body was possessed by the spirits of the Ancient Demon Lords after Hero forced them out of the Demon Queen's body, and intended to make use of them to usurp her position and become the new Demon Lord. After a failed attempt to assassinate Demon Queen, he loses the trust of other clans and flee with his companions. Possessing the powers of the Ancient Demon Lords, Blue Demon Son's strength is on par with Hero's, injuring him badly after a fight between them.

==== Beast Fang clan ====
Duke Silver Tiger (銀虎公, Ginko-kō)
The tiger lord of Beast Fang clan.
South Arctic General (南氷将軍, Nanpyō Shōgun)
Voiced by: Hiroshi Shirokuma
A Walrus-headed demon of tremendous size and power, head of the demon garrison in Aurora Island. As one of the ten strongest warriors in the Demon Realm, he leads several water demon clans whose advantage over the sea prevents the humans reclaiming Aurora Island. While a Glory seeker who does not respects the Demon Queen who he sees as weak, he has respects for those who duel him with honor like the first Winter King which he fought and promises the King before his death that he will spare and let go the surviving forces of the 1st Aurora island Expedition fleet. During the Humans 2nd attempt to reclaim the island, Female Knight and Crimson Scholar manages to take away South Arctic General's forces advantage over the sea by building a land bridge made of ice, allowing the Winter kingdom army to fight the demons on equal terms. When his fortress is surrounded by both the Winter Kingdom forces and the retreating Crusader armies from Gateway city, he realizes they cannot win and orders his army to return to the Demon Realm while he goes to fight the humans alone. He is killed by Female Knight after she accepts his duel to the death and dies knowing he fought a skilled warrior honorably.

==== Other clans ====
There are other four clans in demon realm, namely Humanoid clan, Ogre clan, Machine clan and Giant clan.

Patterned Chief (紋様の長, Mon'yō-no-Osa)
Chief of the Humanoid clan.
Ogre Princess Shrine Maiden (鬼呼の姫巫女, Oniyobi-no-Himemiko)
Princess of the Ogre clan.
General Blue Iron (碧鋼大将, Hekikō-Taishō)
Head of the Machine clan.
Earl Giant (巨人伯, Kyojin-Haku)
Head of the Giant clan.

=== Others ===
Assistant (従僕, Jūboku)
A young boy who becomes Merchant Youngster's assistant after the latter becomes the Winter Kingdom's Finance Minister.
Nightmare Robin (夢魔鶫, Mumatsugumi)
Voiced by: Fuyumi Shiraishi
Hero's familiar.
