= Kickshaws =

Kickshaws (sometimes Association Kickshaws, a non-profit Association under French law) is a private press run by John Crombie and Sheila Bourne.

Based in Paris, the press was founded in 1979 by Crombie as a vehicle for his literary and design aspirations; since then, he and Bourne (who often creates artwork for the books), have printed by hand and published more than 150 small books. The design and typography of Kickshaws publications is unusual, involving a wide range of (often French) type designs, letterpress printing in multiple colours, and the use of unusual formats and binding styles, notably a simple form of comb-binding which allows the leaves of a book to be folded and refolded in different sequences. Textually, many of the books are either Crombie's own poetry or fiction, or his interpretations or translations of French or Francophile humorists and absurdist writers, including Samuel Beckett, Alphonse Allais and Pierre Henri Cami (the latter being a particular favourite of Crombie's, and a writer he considers greatly undervalued). The artwork incorporated into Kickshaws books includes drawings, linocuts and images printed from vinyl cut-outs in a variety of colours, designed to harmonize with the typography of the books and to illustrate, or decorate, the text. Kickshaws publishes books in both French and English (sometimes both), and its publications are in some ways closer to French livres d'artiste than to private press books in the Anglo-American tradition.
