= Janine Charrat =

French dancer and choreographer (1924–2017)

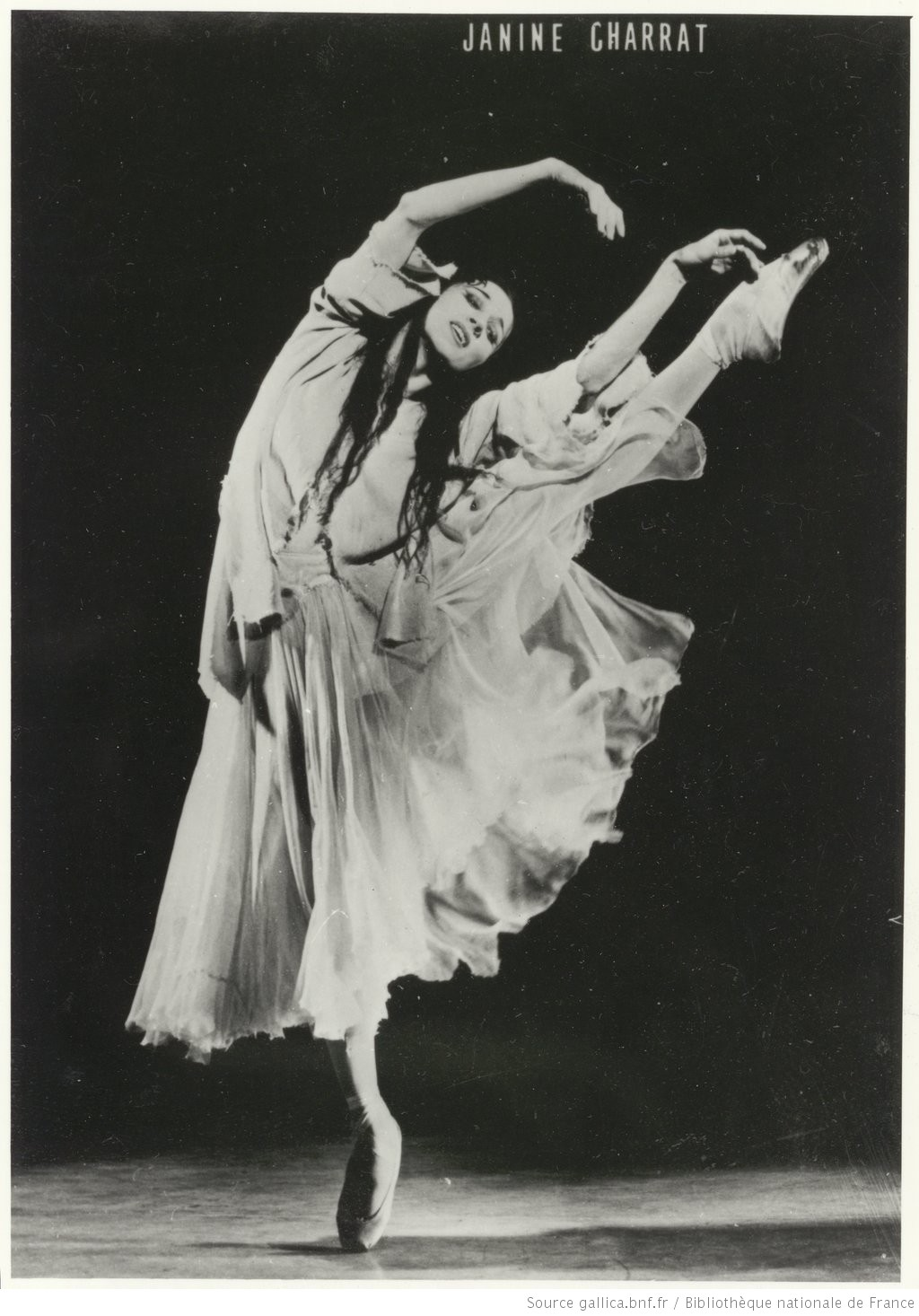
- Born: 24 July 1924; Grenoble, France
- Died: 29 August 2017 (aged 93); Paris, France
- Occupations: Ballet dancer, choreographer

Janine Charrat (24 July 1924 – 29 August 2017) was a French dancer and choreographer. She was considered to be a child prodigy and appeared in Ballerina at the age of 12. She went on to choreograph over 50 ballets. Her 1949 choreography for composer Werner Egk's ballet Abraxas became a standard work in the German dance repertory.

In 1961, she had a serious accident. During a television show, a candle set fire to her tutu and the ensuing burns covered 70% of her body. After receiving life-saving treatment at the Cochin hospital, she stayed at the Thermes de Saint Gervais Mont-Blanc baths. She managed to recover and returned to dancing in 1964.

She was an officer of the Legion of Honour.

== Filmography ==
- 1938: La Mort du cygne, by Jean Benoît-Lévy
- 1952: La Jeune Fille aux allumettes, by Jean Benoît-Lévy
- 1959: Les Algues, by Louis Bertrand Castelli
- 1962: Schéhérazade by Pierre Gaspard-Huit, with Anna Karina and Gil Vidal, choreography by Janine Charrat
- 2001: Janine Charrat, l'instinct de la danse, by Luc Riolon and Rachel Seddoh
