= Something to Sing About (1947 film) =

1947 film

- Directed by: Gilles Grangier
- Written by: Pierre Henri Cami; René Wheeler
- Produced by: André Paulvé
- Starring: Luis Mariano; Arlette Merry; Noël Roquevert
- Cinematography: Fred Langenfeld
- Edited by: Claude Ibéria
- Music by: Georges Van Parys
- Production company: Productions André Paulvé
- Distributed by: DisCina
- Release date: 19 February 1947
- Running time: 95 minutes
- Country: France
- Language: French

Something to Sing About (French: Histoire de chanter) is a 1947 French musical comedy film directed by Gilles Grangier and starring Luis Mariano, Arlette Merry and Noël Roquevert. It was shot at the Victorine Studios in Nice and on location around the city. The film's sets were designed by the art director René Moulaert.

== Synopsis ==
Gino Fabretti, a famous Italian tenor and womaniser, is in Nice on tour where he begins a flirtation with the wife of a surgeon. In revenge the doctor operates on Gino and switches his vocal cords with those of a grocery delivery boy. Now the doctor's wife is fascinated by the beautiful voice of the delivery boy and shows disdain towards Gino. The surgeon ultimately decides to reverse the situation to restore everything to normal in exchange for Gino returning to Italy.

== Cast ==
- Luis Mariano as Gino Fabretti
- Arlette Merry as Gisèle
- Noël Roquevert as Le docteur Renault
- Julien Carette as Robert
- Jacqueline Roman as Jeannette
- Marcel Delaître as Doniol
- Robert Arnoux as Barette
- Jean Gaven as Jack Bing
- Louis Lions as L'assistant
- Pierre Labry as L'agent
- Jean-François Martial as Le livreur
- Jenny Leduc as La bonne du docteur
- Lyska Wells as La bonne de Fabretti

== Bibliography ==
- Prédal, René. Le cinéma français depuis 1945. Nathan, 1991.
- Rège, Philippe. Encyclopedia of French Film Directors, Volume 1. Scarecrow Press, 2009.
