= Jacqueline Cantrelle =

French actress (1925–1994)

- Born: Jacqueline Georgette Cantrelle; 23 September 1925; Paris, France
- Died: 10 October 1994 (aged 69); Saint-Laurent-du-Var, France
- Occupation: Actress
- Parents: William Cantrelle (1888–1956) (father); Marianne Cantrelle (1900–1972) (mother)
- Relatives: Bleuette Bernon (1878–c. 1919)

Jacqueline Georgette Cantrelle (23 September 1925 – 10 October 1994) was a French actress.

Cantrelle was the daughter of the violinist William Cantrelle (1888–1956) and the comedian Marianne Cantrelle (1900–1972). Her grandmother was the actress Bleuette Bernon (1878–c. 1919). Cantrelle died in Saint-Laurent-du-Var on 10 October 1994, at the age of 69.

== Filmography ==
- 1930: Eau, gaz et amour à tous les étages, by Roger Lion
- 1947: Les maris de Léontine, by René Le Hénaff
- 1950: La vie est un jeu, by Raymond Leboursier
- 1951: Casque d'or, by Jacques Becker
- 1952: La Minute de vérité, by Jean Delannoy
- 1955: Lola Montès, by Max Ophüls

== Theatre ==
- 4 July 1942: Les jours heureux, by Claude-André Puget at Salle Don Bosco
- 1 September 1943: Monsieur de Falindor by Georges Manoir and André Verhylle at Théâtre Monceau
- 11 November 1955: Le Système Ribadier, by Georges Feydeau
