= Arlette Merry =

French actress and singer

- Born: 18 March 1918; Paris, France
- Died: 19 February 2015 (aged 96); Paris, France
- Other name: Arlette Jacqueline Pinoteau
- Occupation: Actress
- Years active: 1932 - 1976 (film)

Arlette Merry (18 March 1918 – 19 February 2015) was a French actress and singer. She was the daughter of Lucien Pinoteau and the sister of Claude Pinoteau and Jacques Pinoteau.

She was known for Au théâtre ce soir (1966), Gorri le diable (1968) and Histoire de chanter (1946).

Merry died in February 2015 at the age of 96.

== Filmography ==
Year	Title	Role	Notes
1932	Le chien jaune		Uncredited
1944	L'aventure est au coin de la rue	Hèléne	
1945	Hanged Man's Farm	Amanda	
1946	Messieurs Ludovic	Marika Lamar	
1946	The Eternal Husband	Madame Maria - la prostituée	
1947	The Fugitive	Deanna	
1947	Something to Sing About	Gisèle	
1947	La Cabane aux souvenirs	Denise	
1947	The Lost Village	Berthe	
1948	Si jeunesse savait	Martine	
1948	If It Makes You Happy	Ginette	
1948	The White Night	Jasmine	
1948	Sergil and the Dictator	Dolorès	
1949	Last Love	La couturière	
1949	Brilliant Waltz	Lolita	
1950	Sending of Flowers	Sophie	
1951	The Beautiful Image	La concierge	
1951	La nuit est mon royaume		Uncredited
1952	They Were Five	Valérie - La soeur de Roger, chanteuse de cabaret	
1952	Un jour avec vous	Claude Cartier	
1952	Full House	Florence Garnier	(segment "Le mort dans l'ascenseur")
1953	J'y suis... j'y reste	Gisèle	
1955	The Price of Love	Raymonde	
1957	Escapade	Dolly	
1964	La Mort d'un tueur	L'amie de Lucienne	
1965	Le Chant du monde		

== Bibliography ==
- Rège, Philippe. Encyclopedia of French Film Directors, Volume 1. Scarecrow Press, 2009.
