= Abraxas (ballet) =

Abraxas is a ballet in five scenes with both music and a libretto by Werner Egk that is based on the Faust legend. The original 1948 choreography for the ballet was created by Marcel Luipart, but elicited controversy and was banned after five performances by state censors. A subsequent version by choreographer Janine Charrat became a standard part of the German dance repertory, and the work also was choreographed successfully by Tom Schilling.

== History ==
Abraxas was premiered by the Bavarian State Opera at the Prinzregententheater in Munich, Germany on 6 June 1948 in a production using designs by Wolfgang Znamenacek. The ballet was controversial at its premiere due to its subject matter which some criticized as "obscene" and others as "demonic". It was banned by state censors after just five performances. However, the ballet was later re-choreographed by French dancer Janine Charrat in 1949, and her version of the ballet became a standard work in the German dance repertory. A third version by the choreographer Tom Schilling premiered at the Semperoper in 1957 and was later staged a second time to positive reviews at the Komische Oper Berlin.

The plot of the Abraxas was taken from Heinrich Heine's Der Doctor Faust; an opera libretto he wrote for the impresario Benjamin Lumley but which ultimately never made it to the stage. Heine's story is based on the Faust legend, and was notable for changing the Mephistopheles character from a male role into a female one. In the ballet the female devil convinces Faust to sell his soul in exchange for sexual fulfillment and restoration of youth. However, after meeting the woman Marguerite, Faust falls in love and tears up his contract with the devil which ultimately leads to both his and Marguerite's death.
