= Claude Farell =

Austrian actress (1918–2008)

- Born: 7 May 1918; Vienna, Austria-Hungary
- Died: 17 March 2008 (aged 89); Mâcon, France
- Years active: 1940-1983

Claude Farell, real name Monika Burg, also known as Paulette Colar, Catherine Farell, Paulette Kolar and Paulette von Suchan (7 May 1918 – 17 March 2008) was an Austrian actress.

== Partial filmography ==
- Small Town Poet (1940) - Zenzi
- Immer nur du (1941)
- Annelie (1941) - Ballettschülerin Helene
- Two in a Big City (1942) - Gisela Meinhold
- Laugh Bajazzo (1943) - Giulia
- Titanic (1943) - Manniküre Hedi
- Meine Herren Söhne (1945) - Bettina von Wüstenhagen, Erzieheri
- Wir sehn uns wieder (1945)
- Die Schenke zur ewigen Liebe (1945) - Bärbel
- The Sharks of Gibraltar (1947)
- Les trafiquants de la mer (1947)
- The White Night (1948) - Cécilia
- Dédée d'Anvers (1948) - La prostituée allemande
- The Secret of Mayerling (1949) - La comtesse Marie Larisch
- Drame au Vel'd'Hiv' (1949) - Clara
- Wedding Night In Paradise (1950) - Clarisse Röders
- Beware of Blondes (1950) - Suzanne Wilson
- White Shadows (1951) - Hella
- The Woman's Angle (1952) - Delysia Veronova
- Palace Hotel (1952) - Madame Perrat
- Allô... je t'aime (1952) - Odette Chennevière
- I Vitelloni (1953) - Olga
- The Night Without Morals (1953) - Isabella
- Clivia (1954) - Clivia
- Hotel Adlon (1955) - Dolores Silva
- Captain Gallant of the Foreign Legion (1955, TV Series) - Charlene
- Love Is Just a Fairytale (1955) - Angela Brinkmann
- The Three from the Filling Station (1955) - Irene von Turoff
- The Road to Paradise (1956) - Edith
- Spy for Germany (1956) - Inge Hagen
- Der schräge Otto (1957) - Gerti Korty
- Lilli (1958) - Kira
- Monsieur Suzuki (1960) - Françoise Girène
- Le cercle vicieux (1960) - Dina
- Between Love and Duty (1960)
- Die Gejagten (1961) - Frau Reichle
- Der Hochtourist (1961) - Johanna Mylius
- The Secret of the Black Widow (1963) - Mrs. Ayke
- Jack and Jenny (1963) - Barbara
- Les Compagnons de Jéhu (1966, TV Series) - Mme Tallien
- Im Banne des Unheimlichen (1968) - Adela
- Hugo der Weiberschreck (1969) - Elvira von Rothenburg
- How Did a Nice Girl Like You Get Into This Business? (1970) - Mrs. Epstein
- Vor Gericht seh'n wir uns wieder (1983, TV Movie) - (final film role)
