= Thermes de Saint Gervais Mont-Blanc =

Coordinates: 45.8965°N 6.7056°E

The Thermes de Saint Gervais Mont-Blanc is a spa organized around thermal springs, located in the valley of the Arve, in the hamlet of Fayet, in the municipality of Saint-Gervais-les-Bains in Haute-Savoie.

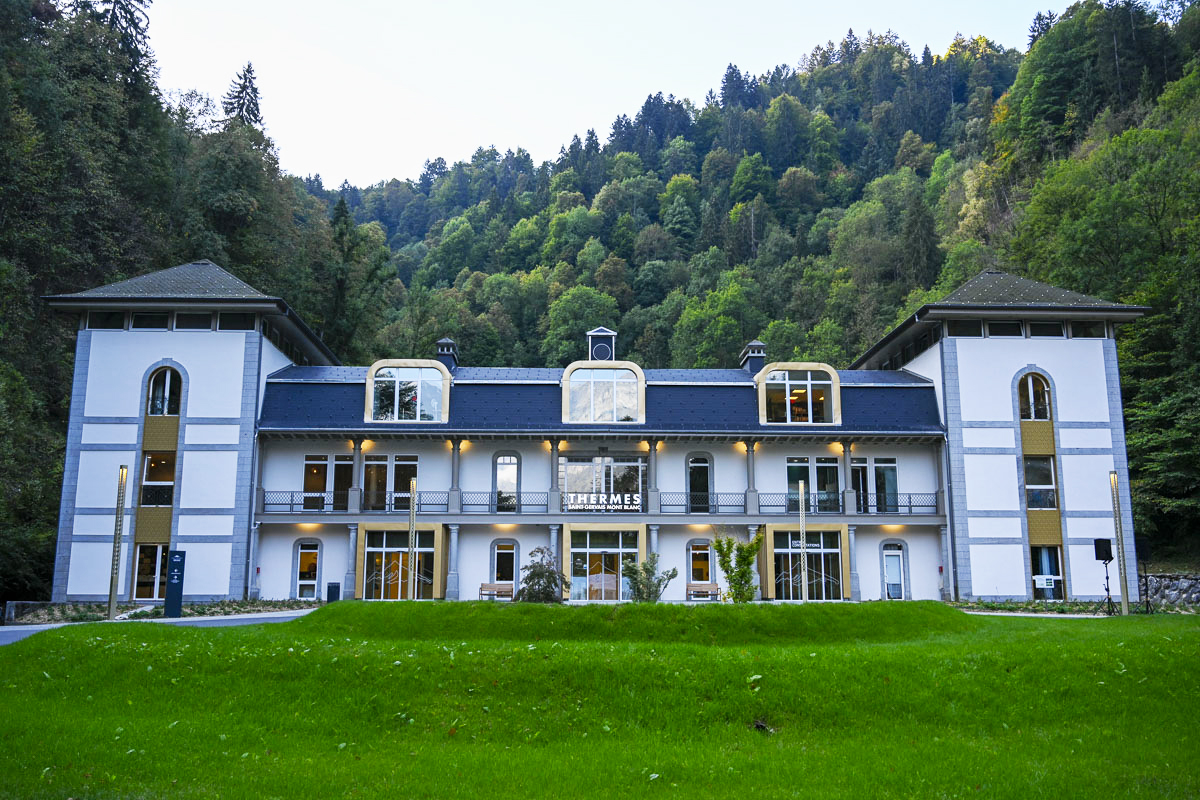

== History ==
The thermal baths of Saint-Gervais Mont Blanc have 200 years of turbulent history of discovery, innovation and revival following times of adversity.

=== Joseph-Marie Gontard founds the thermal baths of Saint-Gervais (1805–1807) ===
In 1805, Saint-Gervais was a rural community with a population of 1,756 Local life centred on farming, fairs, the Sallanches market and religious celebrations. While not a tourist destination, local shepherds took their herds to graze deep in the Gorges du Bonnant where there was a hot spring that ensured the surrounding vegetation flourished earlier than in other parts of the area.

In 1806, the notary Joseph-Marie Gontard commissioned scientists to analyse the spring water. Thrilled with the results, he bought all the land that the spring flowed through. That same year, he had a gallery dug out over the springs where he set up four wooden tubs and opened the very first thermal baths of Saint-Gervais.

In 1807, he raised the building with an extra storey and added two turrets.

==== The early years: intuition and success (1806–1838) ====
From 1806, the thermal baths of Saint-Gervais met with instant success . The site evolved into a prestigious hotel for tourists heading on to Chamonix, hikers setting off for the Mont Blanc Tour and travellers visiting the Alps. Over a thirty-year period, Joseph-Marie Gontard extended, refurbished and transformed the site, taking on a range of roles from wellness centre manager to hotel owner. Up until 1815, the establishment offered evidence-based treatment for patients with a range of different illnesses: rheumatic diseases, neuralgia, epilepsy, scurvy, uterine disorders, etc.

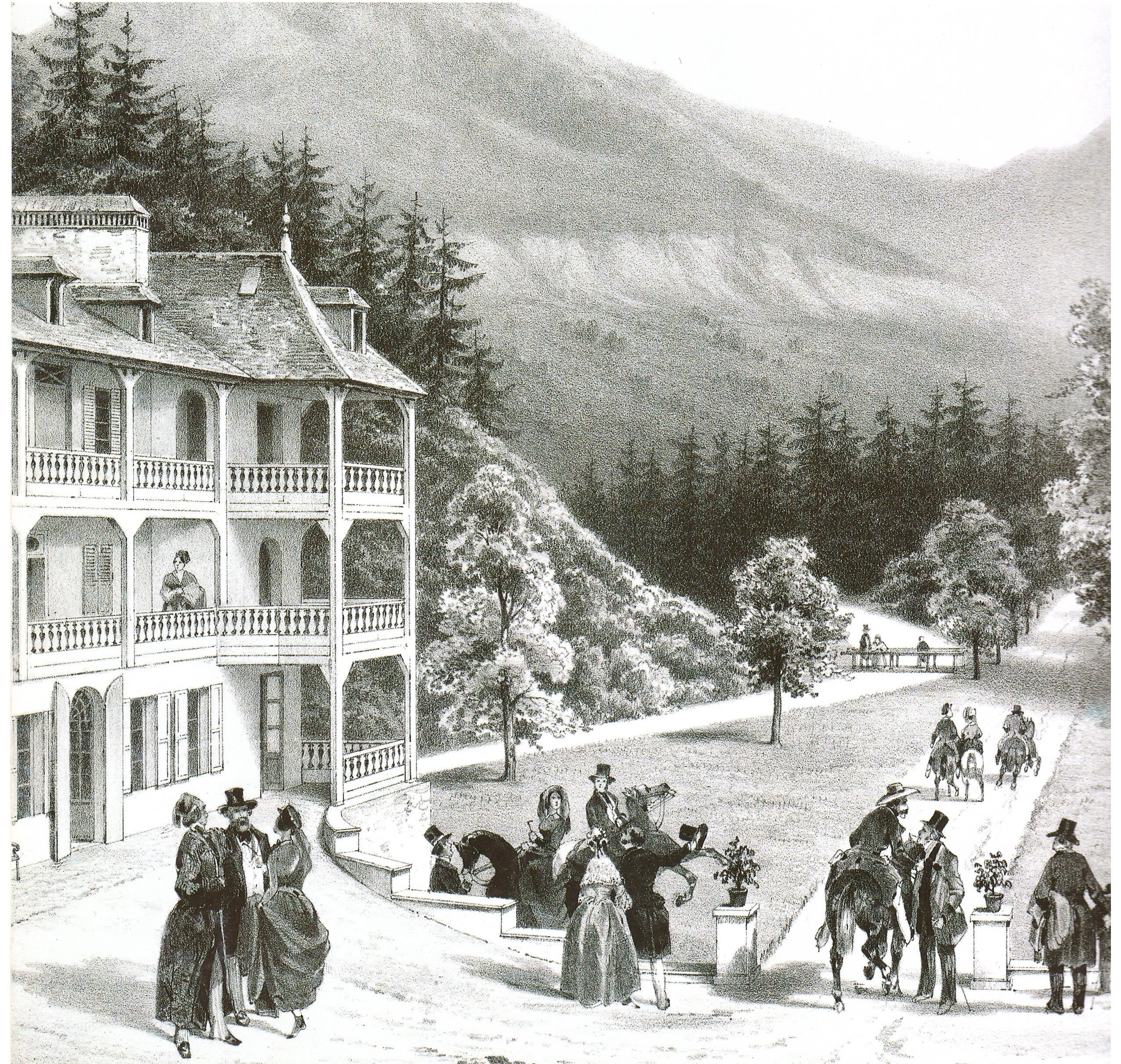
Gravure des thermes de Saint-Gervais au XIX^{e} siècle

==== Doctor Matthey proves the water's effectiveness on the skin (1815) ====
In 1815, Geneva-based doctor Matthey was appointed "Inspecting doctor of Saint-Gervais". He monitored clients' progress, catalogued the illnesses and diseases for which the water proved effective and developed indications for its use: drinking the water, using it in baths, showers, and steam baths . He was the first to notice its immense benefits on the skin: Pityriasis alba, eczema, ulcers. The Saint-Gervais baths now had a specific area of expertise. The baths enjoyed ever-growing popularity until 1838.

==== The baths under Dr. de Mey (1838–1870) ====
In 1838, Joseph-Marie Gontard's establishment was thriving, and he sold the site on to a Belgian doctor, Dr Aloysius-François de Mey. Dr de Mey continued developing the baths, and quickly began renovations and projects to consolidate the baths' fragile under-structures, replacing the old, traditional materials with granite and opening two new extra wings. In 1860, capacity had increased to allow a total of 400 clients to stay at the baths and the establishment was a regional success story. But although the facilities were popular, the tightly controlled atmosphere that reigned over the establishment wasn't to everyone's taste . When Savoie was annexed to France in 1860, the region's tourism industry flourished. That same year, the thermal baths of Saint-Gervais began being overseen by the 'permanent mineral water commission' of the Imperial Academy of Medicine'.

Up until the end of the 19th century, there were no further developments in how the water was used, except in treatments for young children.

==== Management issues and a rebirth (1870–1892) ====
After Dr de Mey's death in 1870, the establishment floundered for 13 years. As stipulated in the doctor's will, the baths were passed on to his 13-year-old nephew, a student of the Dominican Order. Ill-equipped to manage a business of this scale, the Dominican Order took control of the establishment with disastrous results. The baths' reputation dwindled and the establishment began to decline.

In 1883, it was bought by the Compagnie générale des eaux minérales et de bains de mer, a financially stable company that already owned seven baths and enjoyed significant expertise in the field. This proved to be a turning point. More targeted treatments were developed, better adapted to patients' illnesses. Hydrotherapy began being used alongside a host of innovations: pulverisations, compresses and the use of nitrogen . Parallel to this, medical inspector Dr Deligny began promoting the benefits of spring water in treatments for children.

Thanks to advances in medicine in the second half of the 19th century and doctors' research into thermal/spring therapies, the baths were reborn: the future looked bright.

=== Natural catastrophe strikes on 11 July 1892 ===
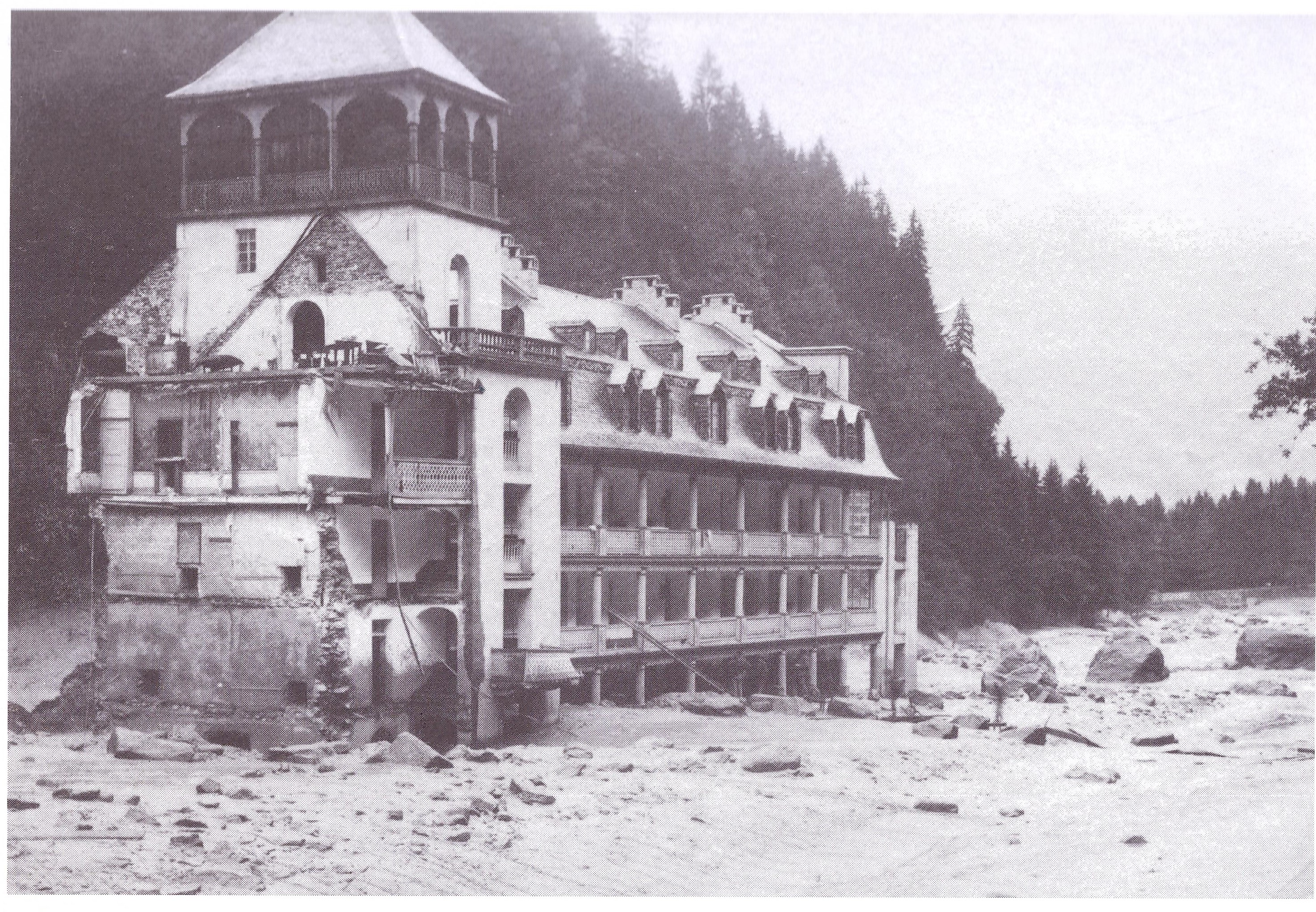

On the night of 11 to 12, the Montjoie Valley was hit by an unforeseen natural catastrophe. At around one o'clock in the morning, a torrent of icy mud and rock swept down the mountain to the Arve plain. The hamlets of Saint-Gervais were significantly damaged and the baths were almost entirely destroyed. Over 75 people were impacted by the incident. On the morning of 12 July, the entire valley was in shock.

=== The new post-catastrophe establishment (1894–1914) ===
On 14 July 1892, three Chamonix guides followed the course of the avalanche up to 3,310 meters to find out what had triggered the event. Around 200,000 cubic metres of water had accumulated at the Tête Rousse glacier before exploding under the pressure and rushing down towards the Montjoie Valley . After being probed and tested, the small glacier was put under high-level surveillance. The water and forest authorities began extensive works to drain the water and the springs were unblocked in November. The Compagnie générale des eaux minérales et de bains de mer undertook work alongside this to rebuild the baths as quickly as possible, a kilometre downstream from the site of the original baths.

In 1894, the new baths were opened, complete with modern architecture and cutting-edge technologies at the forefront of the latest technical advances. This time around, the emphasis was on hydrotherapy: steam booths, nose and throat baths, pulverisation draining, ascending showers, etc. The establishment was also equipped with new medical and hospitality departments. From 1895, thanks to the arrival of the railway line and the Mont Blanc tram, and new hotels and villas popping up across the region, Saint-Gervais entered its golden age and became a holiday destination in its own right.

==== The downfall of the new baths (1918–1930) ====
World War I slammed the brakes on further development. In the aftermath of the war, the baths struggled to pick up where they had left off. Visitor numbers plummeted over the ensuing decade. Several different factors explain why clients stopped coming: competition from the Évian baths and a decrease in the water's effectiveness at the new 1894 establishment, due to the hurried pace at which work had been carried out. Nobody had considered that the faster flow of the springs since the natural catastrophe meant that the mineral profile of the water had been altered, and that the 800 metres of copper piping meant the water was significantly cooler. In December 1925, the Compagnie générale des eaux minérales et de bains de mer threw in the towel and sold the establishment to the Société immobilière et thermale de Saint-Gervais-les-Bains.

In 1925, the company called on shareholders to embark on extensive new renovations: refurbishing the buildings, renovating the piping and treatment infrastructure and creating new leisure facilities: a casino, tennis courts, a theatre, and more. But the company overlooked the root problem: that carrying the water from the spring to the establishment stripped it of most of its healing properties. And visitor numbers failed to pick back up. In 1930, the company filed for bankruptcy.

==== A new lease of life after a council buy-out (1930–1939) ====
In the summer of 1930, the Saint-Gervais council, business partners and locals rallied together to save the spa resort. The local council bought the entire site and appointed doctors Desaux and Paillet as its managers. The establishment built in the wake of the 1892 catastrophe was abandoned and treatment was once again provided at the site of the springs themselves, this time analysed and better protected . 'Children's hubs' were set up in Saint-Gervais village in 1922. The baths had been brought back to life, but the council didn't have the financial means to support new development projects, and World War II erupted in 1939.

==== Hard times (1939–1958) ====
During the war, the establishment continued to receive a handful of clients, and was fitted with an alpine infirmary and medical centre for soldiers. In the aftermath of World War II, the establishment was in the worst state it had ever been. Faced with financial ruin, in 1946 the Saint-Gervais council decided to sell the site to a Chamonix hotel owner, Mr Roy. Yet this unscrupulous businessman did not comply with specifications and began embezzling the money that had been intended for renovating the facilities. Over the next 12 years, the plight of the baths steadily worsened.

==== The Califanos and a spa industry revival (1958–1980) ====
Elected in 1953, the ambitious new mayor Maurice Martel began work on reviving the baths.

In 1958, the council spent 20 million Francs on buying back the establishment it had sold 12 years earlier for just 1 million . At the same time, Dr Lépinay, who had arrived at the spa in 1949, was pursuing his research: in addition to patients with severe eczema, he observed that the Saint-Gervais spring waters had an impact on scar healing and could be used on patients with severe burns.

In 1959, the establishment was handed over to a new manager, Armand Califano and his company Société nouvelle des thermes de Saint-Gervais Le Fayet. It took close to 20 years to get the spa baths back in shape. The treatments' proven effectiveness on severe burns, the management skills of Armand Califano and his wife, and renovations all contributed to restoring the establishment to its former glory.

=== Janine Charrat's accident (1961) ===
In 1961, Janine Charrat, a renowned dancer, had a serious accident. During a television show, a candle set fire to her tutu and the ensuing burns covered 50% of her body. After receiving life-saving treatment at the Cochin hospital, she stayed at the Saint-Gervais spa baths all year round, and was monitored by Dr Lépinay. She managed to recover and returned to dancing in 1964. This success story helped boost the profile of severe burn treatments provided at Saint-Gervais.

=== The new establishment: spa treatments and wellness (1980–1997) ===
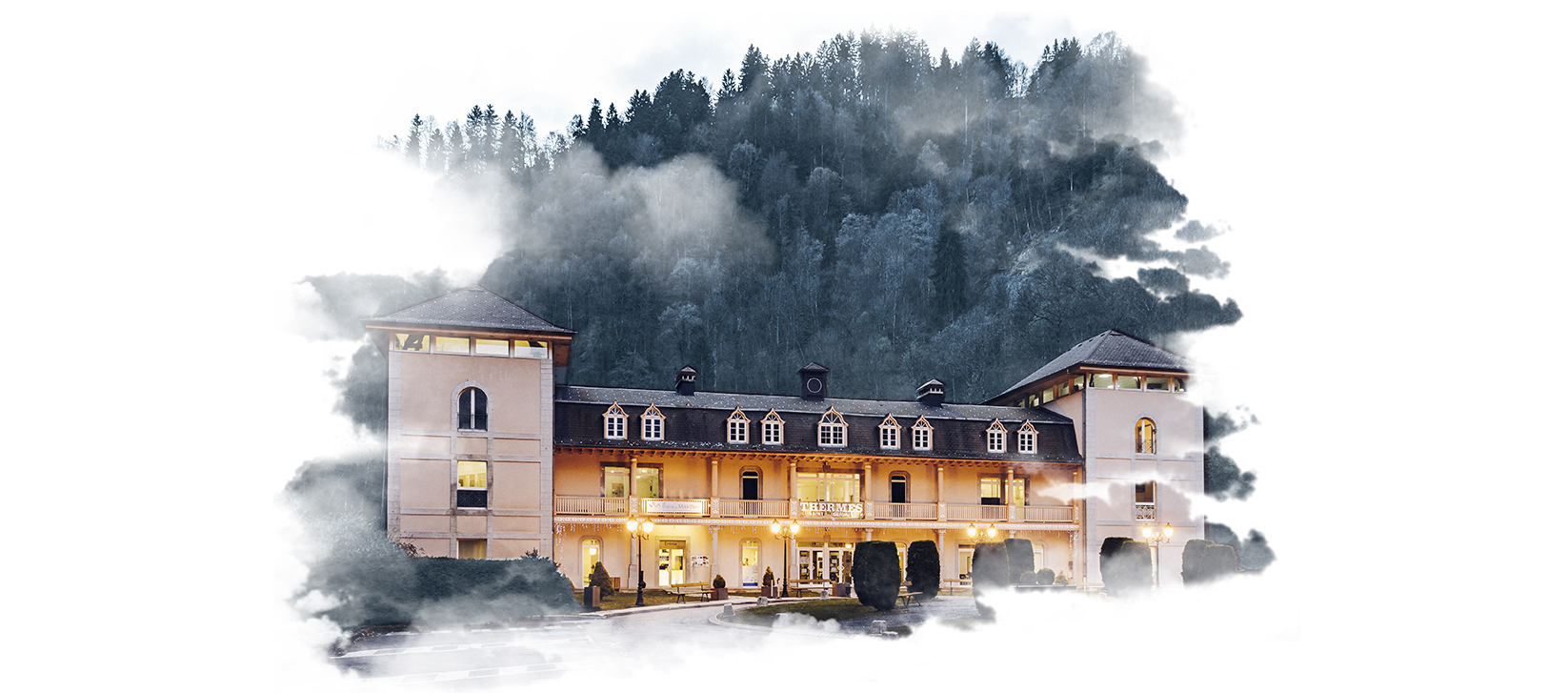
Thermes de Saint-Gervais de nuit

From 1980, new director Bernard Califano began investigating a new approach: wellness spa treatments. Designed by architect B. Ferrari, a new establishment opened its doors in 1992, with a visitor capacity of 10,000 clients. But from 1993, the company found itself unable to pay off its debts. On 6 April 1994, the Saint-Gervais council decided to set up a semi-public company, with the council holding three quarters of the share capital. Up until 2009, it spent 2 million Francs (€305,000) per year on clearing its debts.

In 1996, the National Academy of Medicine listed the water at Saint-Gervais as one of the nine spring waters to have active benefits on skin thanks to its healing, repairing and soothing properties.

=== Modernisation by Laboratoires Rivadis (1997–2016) ===
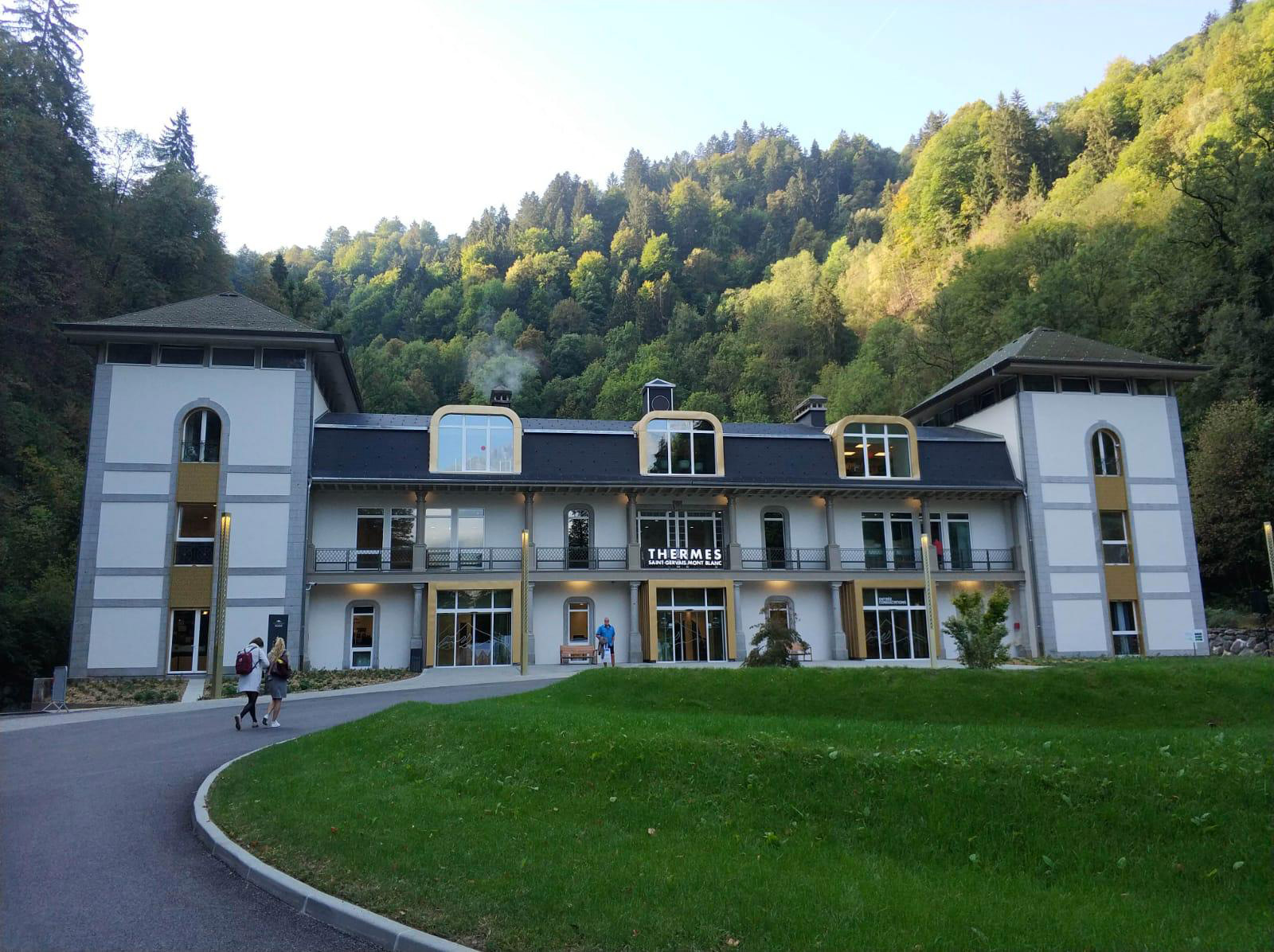

In 1997, the council sold all its company shares to Laboratoires Rivadis while retaining ownership of the building and premises. The group began investing in ushering the spa baths into the modern age, creating new stainless steel piping for the spring water network, refurbishing the beauty institute, setting up an internal laboratory for monitoring the facilities' hygiene levels, etc.

In 2000, the baths were granted ISO 9001 standard certification. In 2010, Rivadis continued expanding the wellness facilities and opened its very first spring water outdoor pool. In 2012, it launched the Saint-Gervais Mont Blanc range of skincare products.

==== L'Oréal buys the brand and baths (2016-present) ====
In 2016, l'Oréal bought out the Société de gestion des thermes de Saint-Gervais-les-Bains and the trademark licence for the Saint-Gervais Mont Blanc products. The town's mayor, Jean-Marc Peillex, described it as "an extraordinary boon for the town".

L'Oréal began turning the licence into a spa brand "at accessible prices for consumers around the world", according to the group's CEO Jean-Paul Agon at the group's general assembly in 2017. The brand is set to be launched in China in 2019.

The park contains a statue of a deer by Pierre-Louis Rouillard, an allegorical statue, La Source ou Thétis by Louis Sauvageau and a fountain. A repeat of the 1892 disaster would not happen today, because glaciers are regularly monitored and drained if necessary. However, the threat still remains.

== Thermal water and its therapeutic qualities ==
Thermal water from Saint-Gervais Mont Blanc is one of 770 types identified in France. Thanks to thousands of years travelling through the depths of the mountain, the water and its active minerals act on the skin with repairing and soothing effects, in on particular scars and burns.

=== A 6,500-year passage through Mont Blanc's underground rock ===
Thermal water derives its properties from its 6,500 years within the tunnels of Mont Blanc. Falling first as rainwater on the mountain, it passes through the tunnels of the Alpine range down to a depth of 3,000 metres, where it circulates at a temperature of 100 °C. On its journey, it first crosses the gypsum bedrock, rich in calcium and sulphates, before coming into contact with crystalline and sedimentary rock composed of quartzite, limestone, gypsum and dolomite. Throughout its passage, it is enriched by active minerals before emerging at the Saint-Gervais source, at a temperature of 39 °C.

=== Healing, soothing anti-inflammatory minerals ===
Saint-Gervais thermal water is up to thirty times richer in minerals than regular mineral water, which gives it anti-inflammatory, healing and soothing properties. Its high sodium, sulphate and chloride content helps maintain cellular homeostasis, or skin balance. Its calcium and magnesium content accelerates the formation of the skin's protective barrier, while strontium helps reduce irritation and itching. Two other components, boron and manganese, respectively boost healing of the skin and its defence against oxidative stress.

=== A dermatological treatment for scars and burns ===
This thermal water is used in dermatology to treat chronic dermatitis like in psoriasis and atopy, including in infants. It has also been used to treat burns since the 1950s. "For severe burns, Saint-Gervais thermal water-based crenotherapy has produced beneficial results, not only for the after-effects of scarring, but also for residual issues with sensitive skin, such as itching and hyperesthesia", according to a 2018 study, Saint-Gervais thermal water, a unique composition, proven dermatological effects.

=== Recognition by the National Academy of Medicine ===
Since 1996, the French National Academy of Medicine has recognised the water in Saint-Gervais Mont Blanc as thermal water that actively benefits the skin with its healing, repairing and soothing properties. The academy noted: "the water's physical and chemical properties make it suitable for dermatological spa treatment (due to its isotonicity and haemostatic and healing properties), for all dermatological and mucocutaneous conditions and after-effects of burns, accidents and other causes... " The appellation awarded by the French National Academy of Medicine is reserved for mineral-rich spring waters boasting therapeutic properties. In France, nine waters have been awarded this label in the dermatology category, with various benefits, linked to the rocks that they come into contact with on their journey.

=== Clinical studies on the dermatological effects of water ===
A series of clinical observations were carried out in 2017. The first study was carried out on the water from Saint-Gervais Mont Blanc, on 51 women aged between 23 and 65 on reactive skin (spraying spa water twice a day for four weeks). It clinically proved the healing and soothing properties of the water: significant fall in itching, rashes, dry skin, tightness and overheating. A second study was carried out to assess the clinical effects of natural spa treatment on 106 treatments (baths, showers, spraying, massages) affected by dermatological conditions (e.g. scarring, eczema, psoriasis). Medical professionals noted an improvement in skin conditions in 100% of cases.
