= Ballerina (1937 film) =

- Directed by: Jean Benoît-Lévy; Marie Epstein
- Screenplay by: Jean Benoît-Lévy; Marie Epstein
- Based on: "La Mort du cygne" by Paul Morand
- Produced by: Maurice Orienter
- Starring: Yvette Chauviré; Mia Slavenska; Jeanine Charrat
- Cinematography: Léonce-Henri Burel; Henri Tiquet
- Music by: Joseph-Etienne Szyfer; Claude Delvincourt
- Production company: Cinatlantica Films
- Distributed by: Comptoir Français du Film
- Release date: 25 November 1937
- Running time: 83 minutes
- Country: France
- Language: French

Ballerina is a 1937 French ballet film directed by Jean Benoît-Lévy and Marie Epstein, starring Yvette Chauviré, Mia Slavenska and Janine Charrat. The original title is La Mort du cygne, the French title for Michel Fokine’s short ballet piece The Dying Swan. It tells the story of a 12-year-old girl who fears that her favourite performer at the Paris Opera Ballet will be replaced by a Russian ballerina, and sets out to engineer an accident for the rival.

The film is based on the 1933 short story "La Mort du cygne" by Paul Morand. The choreography was done by Serge Lifar. The film was remade in the United States as The Unfinished Dance, released in 1947.

== Cast ==
- Yvette Chauviré as Mademoiselle Beaupré
- Mia Slavenska as Nathalie Karine
- André Pernet as Méphiste
- Janine Charrat as Rose Souris
- France Ellys as Madame Souris
- Jean Périer as Le directeur
- Mady Berry as Célestine

== Reception ==
Anna Kisselgoff of The New York Times wrote in 1998: "The hard-nosed American critics raving about the film recognized its special and exquisite quality from the start. Rightly ignoring its surface sentimentality, they were clearly unnerved and impressed by Benoit-Levy's psychological insight into childhood innocence gone awry. Today the film is priceless in its haunting evocation of the Paris Opera on the eve of World War II." Kisselgoff continued: "The title ballet, not to be confused with Fokine's famous solo The Dying Swan, looks downright silly, but elsewhere Lifar's choreography is firmly grounded in the classical idiom. ... Ms. Charrat, as a child performer, and the two ballerinas are extraordinary."
