= The Husbands of Leontine =

1947 film

- Directed by: René Le Hénaff
- Written by: Gil Roland
- Based on: The Husbands of Leontine by Alfred Capus
- Produced by: Marcel Bertrou
- Starring: Jacqueline Gauthier; Pierre Jourdan; Marguerite Pierry
- Cinematography: Raymond Agnel
- Edited by: Hélène Battini
- Music by: Louis Beydts
- Production company: Bertrou et Compagnie
- Distributed by: Astoria Films
- Release date: 29 October 1947
- Running time: 90 minutes
- Country: France
- Language: French

The Husbands of Leontine (French: Les maris de Léontine) is a 1947 French comedy film directed by René Le Hénaff and starring Jacqueline Gauthier, Pierre Jourdan and Marguerite Pierry. The film's sets were designed by the art director Raymond Nègre. The film is based on the 1900 play of the same name by Alfred Capus which had previously been made as a 1928 German silent film Leontine's Husbands.

== Cast ==
- Jacqueline Gauthier as La baronne Léontine de la Jambière
- Pierre Jourdan as Édouard de la Jambière
- Gil Roland as Adolphe Dubois
- Marguerite Pierry as La marquise
- Henri Charrett as Le commissaire
- Paul Demange as Béjut
- Jacqueline Dor as Simone
- Thérèse Dulac as La dame de compagnie
- Marcelle Duval as Virginie
- Jean Fleury as Saturnin
- Raymond Girard as Plantain
- Ulric Guttinguer as Darbois
- Yette Lucas as Ernestine
- Robert Murzeau as Anatole Grimard
- René Pascal
- Marie-France Planeze
- Jacques Sorret as Jacques
- Renée Thorel as Une dame
- Jacqueline Cantrelle

== Bibliography ==
- Rège, Philippe. Encyclopedia of French Film Directors, Volume 1. Scarecrow Press, 2009.
