= The Moment of Truth (1952 film) =

1952 film

- Directed by: Jean Delannoy
- Written by: Jean Delannoy; Henri Jeanson; Roland Laudenbach; Robert Thoeren
- Produced by: Léon Canel; Henry Deutschmeister; Alfred Stöger
- Starring: Michèle Morgan; Jean Gabin; Walter Chiari
- Cinematography: Gianni Di Venanzo; Robert Lefebvre
- Edited by: James Cuenet
- Music by: Paul Misraki; Winfried Zillig; Georges Van Parys
- Production companies: Franco London Films; Società Italiana Cines
- Distributed by: Gaumont Distribution
- Release date: 22 October 1952
- Running time: 109 minutes
- Countries: France; Italy
- Language: French

The Moment of Truth (French: La Minute de vérité, Italian: L'ora della verità) is a 1952 French-Italian drama film directed by Jean Delannoy and starring Michèle Morgan, Jean Gabin and Walter Chiari. Delannoy co-wrote the screenplay with Henri Jeanson, Roland Laudenbach and Robert Thoeren. The music score is by Paul Misraki, Winfried Zillig and Georges Van Parys. It was shot at the Francoeur Studios in Paris. The film's sets were designed by the art director Serge Piménoff.

== Synopsis ==
It tells the story of a doctor, his wife and his patient, who was her former lover.

== Cast ==
- Michèle Morgan as Madeleine Richard
- Jean Gabin as Pierre Richard
- Walter Chiari as Un client du cabaret
- Daniel Gélin as Daniel Prévost
- Denise Clair as Madame Nicolas - la concierge
- Doris Duranti as Madame Berlinga
- Lia Di Leo as Madame Meunier
- Simone Paris as Mony
- Robert Dalban as Taboureau
- Jim Gérald as Eddy - le patron du 'Zéro de conduite'
- Raphaël Patorni as L'acteur partenaire
- Denise Precheur as Rose - la bonne
- Jean-Marc Tennberg as L'interne
- René Génin as Le gardien de l'église d'Assy
- Bever as Un patient
- La petite Marie-France as Simone Richard
- Marfa Dhervilly as L'habilleuse
- Fransined as Le premier comédien en tournée
- Albert Michel as Le second comédien en tournée
- Yvonne Yma as La femme du malade
- Charles Bayard as Un client du cabaret
- Grégoire Gromoff as Un locataire voisin de daniel
- Yette Lucas as La mère d'un gosse
- Laure Paillette as Une concierge
- Marcel Rouzé as Un locataire voisin de Daniel
- Émile Genevois
- Lucien Dorval
- Raymond Faure
- Jacqueline Cantrelle
- Michel Rob
- Jean Chaduc
- André Chanu

== Bibliography ==
- Harriss, Joseph. Jean Gabin: The Actor Who Was France. McFarland, 2018.
- Turk, Edward Baron . Child of Paradise: Marcel Carné and the Golden Age of French Cinema. Harvard University Press, 1989.
