= Heart of Paris =

1932 film

- Directed by: Jean Benoît-Lévy; Marie Epstein
- Written by: Jean Benoît-Lévy; Marie Epstein
- Starring: Simone Mareuil; Blanche Beaume; Jimmy Gaillard
- Cinematography: René Guichard
- Music by: Edouard Flament
- Release date: 26 February 1932
- Running time: 93 minutes
- Country: France
- Language: French

Heart of Paris (French: Coeur de Paris) is a 1932 French film directed by Jean Benoît-Lévy and Marie Epstein and starring Simone Mareuil, Blanche Beaume and Jimmy Gaillard. The film's sets were designed by the art director Hugues Laurent.

== Cast ==
- Simone Mareuil as Jeannette Durand
- Blanche Beaume as Madame Durand
- Jimmy Gaillard as Le jeune Tutur
- Léon Roger-Maxime as Gustave
- Pierre Finaly as Monsieur Wood-Trafinsky
- Paul Velsa
- Albert Broquin

== Bibliography ==
- Crisp, Colin. Genre, Myth and Convention in the French Cinema, 1929-1939. Indiana University Press, 2002.
