= Hélène (film) =

1936 film

- Directed by: Jean Benoît-Lévy
- Written by: Jean Benoît-Lévy; Marie Epstein
- Based on: Helene Willfüer, Student of Chemistry by Vicki Baum
- Produced by: Jean Benoît-Lévy
- Starring: Madeleine Renaud; Jean-Louis Barrault; Constant Rémy
- Cinematography: Philippe Agostini; Léonce-Henri Burel
- Music by: Marcel Lattès
- Production company: Les Films Marquise
- Release date: 17 October 1936
- Running time: 105 minutes
- Country: France
- Language: French

Hélène is a 1936 French drama film directed by Jean Benoît-Lévy and starring Madeleine Renaud, Jean-Louis Barrault and Constant Rémy. It is based on the 1928 novel Helene Willfüer, Student of Chemistry by Vicki Baum, which had previously been adapted into a 1930 German film of the same title. The film's sets were designed by the art director Lucien Carré.

== Synopsis ==
Hélène Wilfur is a gifted medical student under the teaching of Professor Amboise. She attracts the attention of fellow student Pierre, but ultimately dedicates herself to her research with Amboise.

== Cast ==
- Madeleine Renaud as Hélène Wilfur
- Jean-Louis Barrault as Pierre Régnier
- Constant Rémy as Le professeur Amboise
- Héléna Manson as Valérie
- Odette Joyeux as Françoise
- Robert Le Vigan as Le docteur Régnier
- Georges Bever as Le garçon de laboratoire
- Jeanne Helbling as Yvonne Amboise
- Blanche Peyrens as La doctoresse
- Greta Buelens as Totoche
- Marguerite Daulboys as La veuve
- René Dary as Marcel
- Maurice Baquet as Durant Tout Court
- Paul Escoffier as Le juge
- Armand Lurville as Le doyen
- Tsugundo Maki as L'étudiant japonais
- Roger Toziny as Le libraire
- Juozas Miltinis as Le Russe
- Gaby André
- Gilberte Géniat
- Pierre-Louis
- Pierre Sarda

== Bibliography ==
- Andrews, Dudley. Mists of Regret: Culture and Sensibility in Classic French Film. Princeton University Press, 1995.
