= Simone Bourday =

French actress

- Simone Bourday in La Vie miraculeuse de Thérèse Martin (1929)
- Born: 23 August 1912; Le Raincy, France
- Died: 27 December 1943 (aged 31); Paris, France
- Other name: Simone Edmonde Lourdelet
- Occupation: Actress
- Years active: 1929–1940 (film)

Simone Bourday (1912–1943) was a French stage and film actress.

== Selected filmography ==
- La Vie miraculeuse de Thérèse Martin (1929)
- The Crime of Sylvestre Bonnard (1929)
- The Sweetness of Loving (1930)
- The Voice of Happiness (1931)
- The Train of Suicides (1931)
- The Levy Department Stores (1932)
- In Old Alsace (1933)
- The Faceless Voice (1933)
- Itto (1934)
- The Bread Peddler (1934)
- King of the Camargue (1935)
- The Dying Land (1936)

== Bibliography ==
- Crisp, Colin. French Cinema—A Critical Filmography: Volume 1, 1929-1939. Indiana University Press, 2015.
