= Itto =

1934 film

- Directed by: Jean Benoît-Lévy; Marie Epstein
- Written by: Maurice Le Glay (novels) Georges Duvernoy; Roger Féral; Etienne Rey
- Produced by: Pierre Blondy
- Starring: Simone Berriau; Simone Bourday; Hubert Prélier
- Cinematography: Philippe Agostini; Georges Asselin; Pierre Levent; Paul Parguel
- Music by: Albert Wolff
- Production company: Eden Productions
- Release date: 1934
- Running time: 117 minutes
- Country: France
- Language: French

Itto is a 1934 French drama film directed by Jean Benoît-Lévy and Marie Epstein and starring Simone Berriau, Simone Bourday and Hubert Prélier. It was shot on location in Morocco.

== Cast ==
- Simone Berriau as Itto
- Simone Bourday as Françoise
- Hubert Prélier as Doctor Darieux
- Pauline Carton as Tante Anna
- Sylvette Fillacier as La blédarde
- Moulay Ibrahim as Hamou
- Aisha Fadah as Aisha
- Ben Brick as Miloud
- Maïa Severin as Madame Dumontier
- Gina Yanne as La journaliste
- Mohand Youssef as Le père de Miloud
- Si Saïd as Saïd
- Camille Bert as Le colonel
- Roland Caillaux as Lieutenant Jean Dumontier
- Pierre Sarda as L'officier des renseignements
- Dalrès as Le caporal
- Bernard Rédor as L'officier aviateur
- Mériel as Monsieur Dumontier
- Henri Debain as Le sergent

== See also ==
- Cinema of Morocco

== Bibliography ==
- Bessy, Maurice & Chirat, Raymond. Histoire du cinéma français: 1929-1934. Pygmalion, 1988.
- Crisp, Colin. Genre, Myth and Convention in the French Cinema, 1929-1939. Indiana University Press, 2002.
- Kennedy-Karpat, Colleen. Rogues, Romance, and Exoticism in French Cinema of the 1930s. Fairleigh Dickinson, 2013.
- Slavin, David Henry. Colonial Cinema and Imperial France, 1919–1939: White Blind Spots, Male Fantasies, Settler Myths. JHU Press, 2001.
