= Last Love (1949 film) =

1949 film

- Directed by: Jean Stelli
- Written by: Georges Ohnet (novel); Françoise Giroud
- Produced by: Aimé Frapin
- Starring: Annabella; Georges Marchal; Jean Debucourt
- Cinematography: René Gaveau
- Edited by: Mireille Baron; Andrée Laurent
- Music by: René Sylviano
- Production company: Consortium de Productions de Films
- Distributed by: Consortium du Film
- Release date: 12 August 1949
- Running time: 99 minutes
- Country: France
- Language: French

Last Love (French: Dernier amour) is a 1949 French drama film directed by Jean Stelli and starring Annabella, Georges Marchal and Jean Debucourt.

It was shot at the Billancourt Studios in Paris. The film's sets were designed by the art director Robert Hubert.

== Cast ==
- Annabella as Hélène Fontenay
- Georges Marchal as Alain Fontenay
- Jean Debucourt as Le comte de Cravant
- Jeanne Moreau as Michèle
- Suzanne Flon as Simone
- Jean-Pierre Kérien as Paul
- France Asselin as La petite femme
- Charles Bayard
- Robert Blome
- Roger Bontemps as Georges
- André Chanu as Robert
- Yvette Etiévant as Lina Bell
- Luce Fabiole as L'habilleuse
- Christian Fourcade
- Arlette Merry as La couturière
- Marcelle Monthil as Maria

== Bibliography ==
- Dayna Oscherwitz & MaryEllen Higgins. The A to Z of French Cinema. Scarecrow Press, 2009.
