= Life Is a Game =

- Directed by: Raymond Leboursier
- Written by: Jean Halain; Raymond Leboursier
- Produced by: Bernard Thévenot
- Starring: Rellys; Jacqueline Delubac; Jimmy Gaillard
- Cinematography: Raymond Clunie
- Edited by: Yanick Chabanian
- Music by: Jean Marion
- Production company: Sidéral Films
- Distributed by: La Société des Films Sirius
- Release date: 13 June 1951
- Running time: 82 minutes
- Country: France
- Language: French

Life Is a Game (French: La vie est un jeu) is a 1951 French comedy film directed by Raymond Leboursier and starring Rellys, Jacqueline Delubac and Jimmy Gaillard.

== Cast ==
- Rellys as Meristo
- Jacqueline Delubac as Evanella
- Jimmy Gaillard as Jean Lassère
- Félix Oudart as L'oncle Amédée
- Jean Martinelli as Le directeur du journal
- Gisèle François as La fille du directeur
- Jacqueline Cantrelle
- Louis de Funès as Un voleur
- Jacques Dynam
- Gisèle Gray
- Jacques Meyran
- Marcel Pérès
- Robert Vattier

== Bibliography ==
- Bertrand Dicale. Louis de Funès, grimaces et gloire. Grasset, 2009.
