= Jimmy Gaillard =

French actor

- Born: Maurice Gurtner; 11 November 1916; Lyon, Rhône; France
- Died: 17 April 1985 (aged 68); Nice, Alpes-Maritimes; France
- Occupation: Actor
- Years active: 1924 - 1953 (film)

Jimmy Gaillard (1916–1985) was a French actor. He began his film career in 1924 as a child actor.

== Selected filmography ==
- The Mystery of the Eiffel Tower (1928)
- Peach Skin (1929)
- Heart of Paris (1932)
- Whirlwind of Paris (1939)
- Nightclub Hostess (1939)
- Prince Charming (1942)
- The Lover of Borneo (1942)
- Mademoiselle Béatrice (1943)
- Arlette and Love (1943)
- Son of France (1946)
- Gringalet (1946)
- Vertigo (1947)
- The White Night (1948)
- Judicial Error (1948)
- Life Is a Game (1951)
- Music in the Head (1951)
- The Fighting Drummer (1953)

== Bibliography ==
- Sandy Flitterman-Lewis. To Desire Differently: Feminism and the French Cinema. University of Illinois Press, 1990.
