= La Vie miraculeuse de Thérèse Martin =

1929 film

- Directed by: Julien Duvivier
- Produced by: Marcel Vandal; Charles Delac
- Starring: Simone Bourday; André Marnay; François Viguier; Janine Borelli
- Release date: 8 November 1929
- Running time: 113 minutes
- Country: France

La Vie miraculeuse de Thérèse Martin (The Miraculous Life of Thérèse Martin), is a French film, silent, directed by Julien Duvivier, and released in 1929. It is a " stark and striking biographical account of the late 19th century Discalced Carmelite nun who died at age 24 from tuberculosis and was canonized in 1925." The film is based on the spiritual autobiography Thérèse wrote, L'Histoire d'une âme. The same material inspired Alain Cavalier's film Thérèse. "Simone Bourday has genuine adolescent fervour as Thérèse and André Marnay is pathetically fine as her father. The sequence of the taking of the veil has extraordinary documentary force." Art direction on the film was by the future director Christian-Jaque.

== Plot ==
La Vie miraculeuse de Thérèse Martin (1929)

The film follows Thérèse Martin as she moves from the close circle of her family home in Lisieux to the austere world of the Carmel, where she joins her older sisters Pauline and Marie. In this film version of the saint's life the Devil (François Viguier) appears, before her taking of the veil, and again when she lies ill in the infirmary. This is a direct allusion to the trials she faced when she doubted her vocation, and near the end of her life when she wondered how she would die. " In childhood the great events of my life seemed from afar like mountains I could never reach. When I saw other little girls going to First Communion, I said to myself: how shall I ever reach my First Communion? Later: how shall I ever get to the point of entering Carmel? And still later: reach my Clothing, make my Profession? And now I say the same of dying. The devil is about me. I feel him near me. He torments me and holds me with a grip of iron to deprive me of all consolation, trying by increasing my sufferings to make me despair. Oh, how necessary it is to pray for the dying. If you only knew! How needful is that prayer we use at Compline: "Free us from the phantoms of the night!"

== Cast ==
- Simone Bourday as Thérèse of Lisieux
- André Marnay as Louis Martin, her father
- Janine Borelli
- François Viguier as Satan
- Lionel Salem as Louis Martin
- Suzanne Christy
- Jane Dolys
- Nina Vanna
- Pierre Blondy
