= Helene Willfüer, Student of Chemistry (novel) =

1928 novel

- 1956 edition
- Author: Vicki Baum
- Language: German
- Genre: Drama
- Publication date: 1928
- Media type: Print

Helene Willfüer, Student of Chemistry (German: Stud. chem. Helene Willfüer) is a 1928 novel by the Austrian writer Vicki Baum.Like several of other works of the time it was serialised in the Berliner Illustrirte Zeitung.

== Film adaptations ==
It has been the basis for three films: the 1930 German silent film Helene Willfüer, Student of Chemistry with Olga Chekhova in the title role, the 1936 French film Hélène starring Madeleine Renaud and the 1956 West German film Studentin Helene Willfüer in which Ruth Niehaus played Helene.

== Bibliography ==
- Goble, Alan. The Complete Index to Literary Sources in Film. Walter de Gruyter, 1999.
- King, Lynda J. Best-sellers by Design: Vicki Baum and the House of Ullstein. Wayne State University Press, 1988.
