= The White Night =

- Directed by: Richard Pottier
- Written by: Yvan Noé (novel); Jacques Natanson
- Produced by: Fritz Bukofzer; Albert Dodrumez; Paul Glass
- Starring: Pierre Brasseur; Claude Farell; Jimmy Gaillard
- Cinematography: Robert Lefebvre
- Edited by: Martine Velle
- Music by: Joe Hajos
- Production company: Les Films Tellus
- Distributed by: Compagnie Commerciale Française Cinématographique
- Release date: 3 September 1948
- Running time: 100 minutes
- Country: France
- Language: French

The White Night (French: La nuit blanche) is a 1948 French drama film directed by Richard Pottier and starring Pierre Brasseur, Claude Farell and Jimmy Gaillard. The film's sets were designed by the art director Paul-Louis Boutié.

== Cast ==
- Pierre Brasseur as Pierre Taverny
- Claude Farell as Cécilia
- Jimmy Gaillard as L'inspecteur Legrand
- Jacques Dacqmine as Jacques Davenne
- Pierre Larquey as Emile
- Arlette Merry as Jasmine
- André Brunot as Lestrade
- Jean Charpini as Le couturier J.P. Hyacinthe
- Henri Bosc as Le directeur de la P.J
- Jacqueline Duc as La concierge

== Bibliography ==
- Parish, Robert. Film Actors Guide. Scarecrow Press, 1977.
