= Helene Willfüer, Student of Chemistry (film) =

1930 film

- Directed by: Fred Sauer
- Written by: Curt J. Braun; Herbert Rosenfeld
- Based on: Helene Willfüer, Student of Chemistry by Vicki Baum
- Produced by: Heinrich Nebenzahl; Gustav Schwab; Josef Stein
- Starring: Olga Chekhova; Ernst Stahl-Nachbaur; Elza Temary
- Cinematography: Franz Planer
- Production company: Ideal-Film
- Distributed by: Ideal-Film
- Release date: 3 March 1930
- Country: Germany
- Languages: Silent; German intertitles

Helene Willfüer, Student of Chemistry (German: Stud. chem. Helene Willfüer) is a 1930 German silent drama film directed by Fred Sauer and starring Olga Chekhova, Ernst Stahl-Nachbaur and Elza Temary. It is based on the 1928 novel of the same title by Vicki Baum, which was subsequently remade as the 1936 French film Hélène and the 1956 West German film Studentin Helene Willfüer. The film's sets were designed by the art director Max Heilbronner. Location shooting took place around Heidelberg.

== Cast ==
- Olga Chekhova as Helene Willfüer
- Ernst Stahl-Nachbaur as Professor Ambrosius
- Elza Temary as Yvonne, seine Frau
- Igo Sym as Rainer
- Hermann Vallentin as Sein Vater
- Gerhard Dammann as Laboratoriumsdiener
- Antonie Jaeckel as Ärztin
- Egon von Jordan
- Hertha von Walther
- Sophie Pagay

== Bibliography ==
- Bock, Hans-Michael & Bergfelder, Tim. The Concise CineGraph. Encyclopedia of German Cinema. Berghahn Books, 2009.
- Goble, Alan. The Complete Index to Literary Sources in Film. Walter de Gruyter, 1999.
