= Marie Epstein =

French actress, director and film preservationist

- Born: Marie-Antonine Epstein; 14 August 1899; Warsaw, Kingdom of Poland, Russian Empire
- Died: 24 April 1995 (aged 95); Paris, France
- Occupations: Film director; scenarist; film preservationist; actress
- Years active: 1923—1977
- Relatives: Jean Epstein (brother)

Marie-Antonine Epstein (French pronunciation: [maʁi ɑ̃tɔnin ɛpʃtajn]; 14 August 1899 – 24 April 1995) was a French actress, scenarist, film director, and film preservationist. Her career is distinguished by three important collaborations. Throughout the 1920s, she acted in and wrote scenarios for films directed by her brother, Jean Epstein. From the 1920s through the early 1950s, she collaborated with the director Jean Benoît-Lévy on sixteen films, serving variously as a writer, assistant director, and co-director. From the early 1950s to her retirement in 1977, Epstein served as a film preservationist at the Cinémathèque française.

== Career ==
=== Collaboration with Jean Benoît-Lévy (1928–1940) ===
Peau de Pêche, a 1929 collaboration with Jean Benoît-Lévy

Epstein is best known for the films she co-directed with Jean Benoît-Lévy throughout the 1930s. Moving away from the romantic scenarios she wrote for Jean Epstein, her films with Benoît-Lévy employ many of the avant-garde techniques developed in French Impressionist Cinema of the 1920s to explore major social issues facing France in the 1930s, especially poverty, single motherhood, the struggles of oppressed women, and the plight of poor and neglected children. As film historian Alan Williams notes, Benoît-Lévy and Epstein's films "always pay careful attention to the moral choices required by particular social conditions."

While their films reflect the Poetic Realism prominent in 1930s French cinema, their work makes greater use of experimental editing techniques. Describing La Maternelle (1933), a film about state-run nursery education, Williams notes that the film recalls "the tradition of cinematic impressionism" by using "subjective editing" to convey "traumatic events in the life of a neglected slum child" and by presenting a woman's "attempted suicide in a rapid sequence of disparate images" to communicate the episode's violence. Film scholar Sandy Flitterman-Lewis also calls attention to this episode because the woman looks directly at the camera (a rarity in films of this period), "implicating the spectator directly" in the woman's suicide.

Benoît-Lévy and Epstein's films also depart from typical Poetic Realist films in their treatment of social issues. As film scholar Ginette Vincendeau says in her obituary for Epstein, La Maternelle offers a "useful corrective" to Jean Vigo's Zéro de conduite. Whereas Vigo's film portrays the French education system as cruel and ineffectual, La Maternelle depicts "school as an instrument of social liberation rather than repression." Vincendeau and Gwendolyn Audrey Foster also note that Benoît-Lévy and Epstein's films place particular importance on the challenges confronting women and feature a number of strong female characters, both unusual in French films of the period.

=== 1940s ===
As a Jew, Epstein was arrested by the Gestapo in February, 1944, but avoided deportation and was later released thanks to the efforts of friends in the French film industry and the Red Cross, for which she worked. Epstein's filmmaking career came to a standstill during the 1940s.

=== Late documentaries and preservation work (1950s–1977) ===
In the early 1950s, Epstein served as an assistant director for several short documentary films directed by Benoît-Lévy, and in 1953, completed the only film for which she is credited as the sole director, La Grande espérance, a documentary about atomic energy.

Beginning in the early 1950s, Epstein worked as a preservationist of silent cinema under the guidance of Henri Langlois at the Cinémathèque française. She is known to have restored Abel Gance's Napoléon (1927), as well as films by her brother, Jean Epstein. She retired from the Cinémathèque in 1977.

== Filmography ==
=== Director ===
- La Grande espérance (1953)

=== Co-director with Jean Benoît-Lévy ===
Given the collaborative relationship between Benoît-Lévy and Epstein, it is difficult to determine Epstein's exact contribution to these films. Epstein likely served as a writer and assistant for some films and as co-director for others.

- Il était une fois trois amis (1928)
- Âmes d'enfants (1928)
- Peau de Pêche (1928)
- Maternité (1929)
- Heart of Paris (1932)
- La Maternelle (1933)
- Itto (1934)
- Hélène (1936)
- Ballerina (La mort du cygne) (1937)
- Altitude 3200 (1938)
- Le feu de paille (1939)

=== Assistant director ===
Unless otherwise noted, all films are directed by Jean Benoît-Lévy.

- Coeur fidèle (Jean Epstein, 1923)
- Agence matrimoniale (1952)
- Le congrès de la dance (1952)
- Deux maîtres pour un valet (1952)
- Le poignard (1952)
- Sous les ponts (1952)

=== Writer ===
- Coeur fidèle (Jean Epstein, 1923)
- L'Affiche (Jean Epstein, 1924)
- Le double amour (Jean Epstein, 1925)
- Six et demi onze (Jean Epstein, 1927)
- Vive la vie (Jean Epstein, 1937)
- La liberté surveillée (Henri Aisner and Vladimír Vlcek, 1958)

=== Actor ===
- Cœur fidèle (Jean Epstein, 1923)

=== Appearances ===
- Citizen Langlois (Edgardo Cozarinsky, 1995)
- Le Fantôme d'Henri Langlois (Jacques Richard, 2004)
