= Pierre Henri Cami =

French humorist (1884–1958)

- Born: 20 June 1884; France
- Died: 1958 (aged 73–74)
- Occupation: Humorist

Pierre Henri Cami (20 June 1884 – 3 November 1958) was a French humorist.

== Works ==
- Les Amours de Mathusalem, 1925
- Vendetta ! ou Une aventure corsée. éd. E. Flammarion, Paris, 1926, 248
- Cami-Voyageur ou Mes aventures en Amérique, coll. Les Auteurs gais, éd. E. Flammarion, Paris, 1927, 242
- Les Mémoires de Dieu le père, 1930
- Pssitt et Pchutt dans le cirque de la vie (entrées camiques), 1932
- L'Œuf à voiles, 1934
- Quand j'étais jeune fille…, mémoires d'un gendarme. éd. Baudinière, Paris, 1937, 320
- Le Voyage inouï de monsieur Rikiki, 1938
- Album de Roussignoulet, impr. de Lescher-Moutoué, Pau, 1941, 16
- Les Nouveaux Paysans, 1943 (?)
- Détective à moteur : L'Énigme des cinq pavillons, 1945
- Un beau jour de printemps, 1946
- Détective à moteur (Krik-robot) : Les Kidnappés du panthéon, éd. P. Dupont, Paris, 1947
- Sans-un au purgatoire ou Après le jugement dernier, 1948
- Le Poilu aux mille trucs et autres nouvelles et drames comiques, Grande Collection nationale No. 66, éd. F. Rouff, Paris, 36

=== Novels ===
- Les Amours de Mathusalem, coll. Les Auteurs gais, éd. E. Flammarion, Paris, 1925, 284
- Le Jugement dernier, roman prématuré, éd. Baudinière, Paris, 1928, 320
- Le Scaphandrier de la Tour Eiffel, éd. Baudinière, Paris, 1929, 320
- Le Fils des Trois Mousquetaires, roman héroï-camique, éd. Baudinière, Paris, 1929, 232
- Christophe Colomb ou La Véritable Découverte de l'Amérique, roman sonore, éd. Baudinière, Paris, 1931, 288
- Les Amants de l'entre-ciel, éd. Baudinière, Paris, 1933, 351
- Les Chevaliers du gai, roman de jaquette et d'épée, éd. Baudinière, Paris, 1935, 286
- Les Nouveaux paysans, éd. Baudinière, Paris, 1943, 251
- La Ceinture de dame Alix, roman à clé, éd. Baudinière, Paris, 1946, 224
- Je ferai cocu le percepteur, roman fiscal et passionnel, éd. Baudinière, Paris, 1949, 253

== Bibliography ==
- A Sampler par Cami : English translation by John Crombie (2013)
