= Jean Benoît-Lévy =

French film director and producer

- Born: 25 April 1888; Paris, France
- Died: 2 August 1959 (aged 71); Paris, France
- Occupations: Director, Producer, Writer
- Years active: 1916–1952 (film)

Jean Benoît-Lévy (1888–1959) was a French film director and producer.

== Selected filmography ==
- Heart of Paris (1932)
- Itto (1934)
- Hélène (1936)
- Ballerina (1937)
- Fire in the Straw (1939)

== Bibliography ==
- Andrews, Dudley. Mists of Regret: Culture and Sensibility in Classic French Film. Princeton University Press, 1995.
