= Portrait of an Army Doctor =

Painting by Albert Gleizes

- Portrait d'un médecin militaire (French)
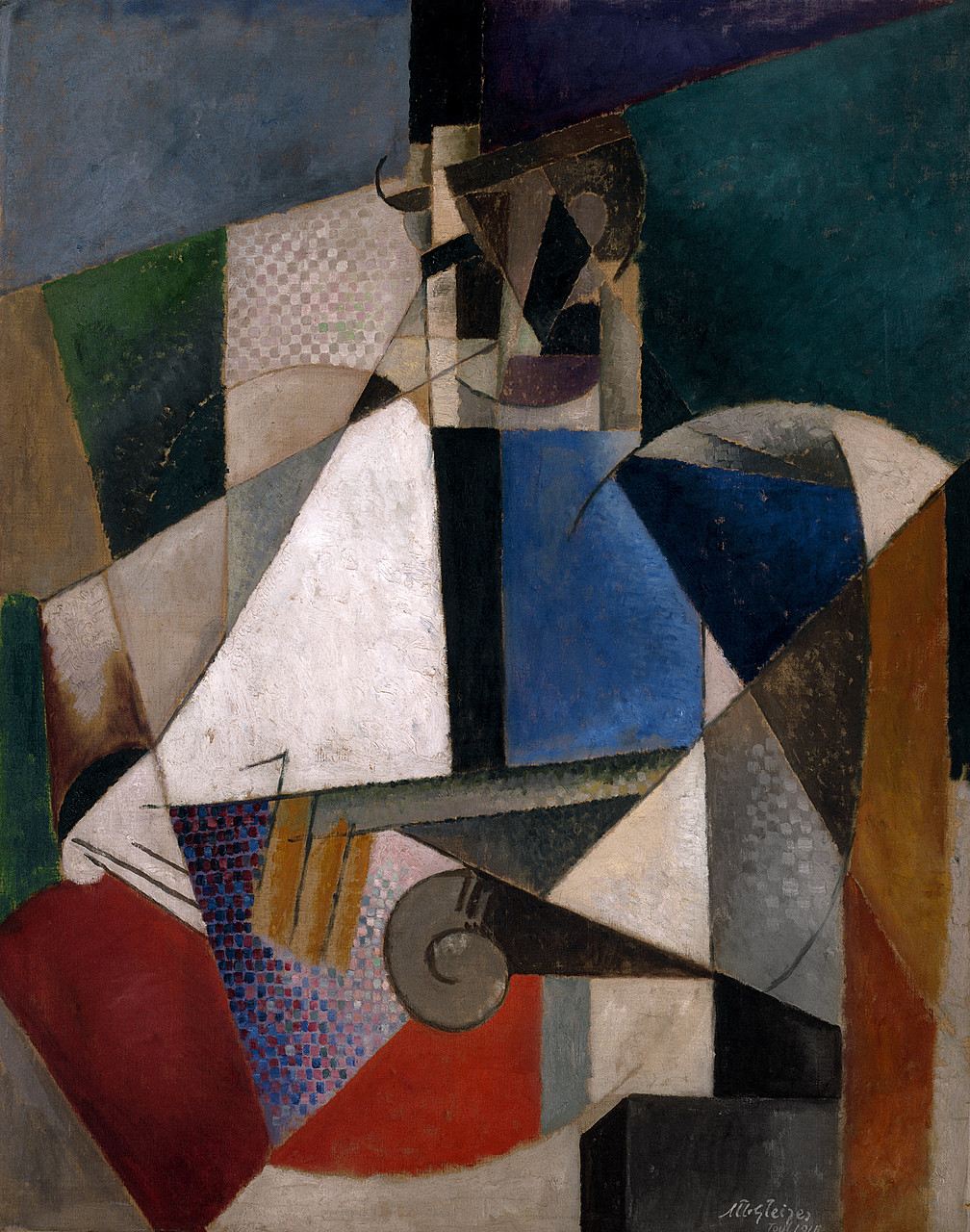
- Artist: Albert Gleizes
- Year: 1914–15
- Medium: Oil on canvas
- Dimensions: 119.8 cm × 95.1 cm (47.25 in × 37.44 in)
- Location: Solomon R. Guggenheim Museum, New York

Portrait of an Army Doctor (in French Portrait d'un médecin militaire) is an oil-on-canvas painting created during 1914–15 by the French artist, theorist and writer Albert Gleizes. Painted at the fortress city of Toul (Lorraine) while Gleizes served in the military during the First World War, the painting's abstract circular rhythms and intersecting aslant planes announce the beginning of the second synthetic phase of Cubism. The work represents Gleizes's commanding officer, Major Mayer-Simon Lambert (1870–1943), the regimental surgeon in charge of the military hospital at Toul. At least eight preparatory sketches, gouaches and watercolors of the work have survived, though Portrait of an Army Doctor is one of Gleizes's only major oil paintings of the period.

As other wartime works by Gleizes, Portrait of an Army Doctor represents a break from the first phase of Cubism. These wartime works mark "the beginning of an attempt to preserve specific and individual visual characteristics while experimenting with a radically different compositional treatment in which broad planes, angled from the perimeter, meet circles." (Robbins, 1964) Rather than based on the analysis of volumetric objects, the artist strove toward synthesis; something that originated in unity.

Portrait of an Army Doctor—earlier forming part of the collection of art dealer Léonce Rosenberg—was purchased by Solomon R. Guggenheim at an important Gleizes exhibition at René Gimpel Galerie in New York City, December 1936 to January 1937 (no. 8). The work forms part of the Solomon R. Guggenheim Founding Collection. It was gifted to the museum by Solomon Guggenheim in 1937 (the year of the formation of the foundation). The painting is in the permanent collection of the Solomon R. Guggenheim Museum in New York City.

== Description ==
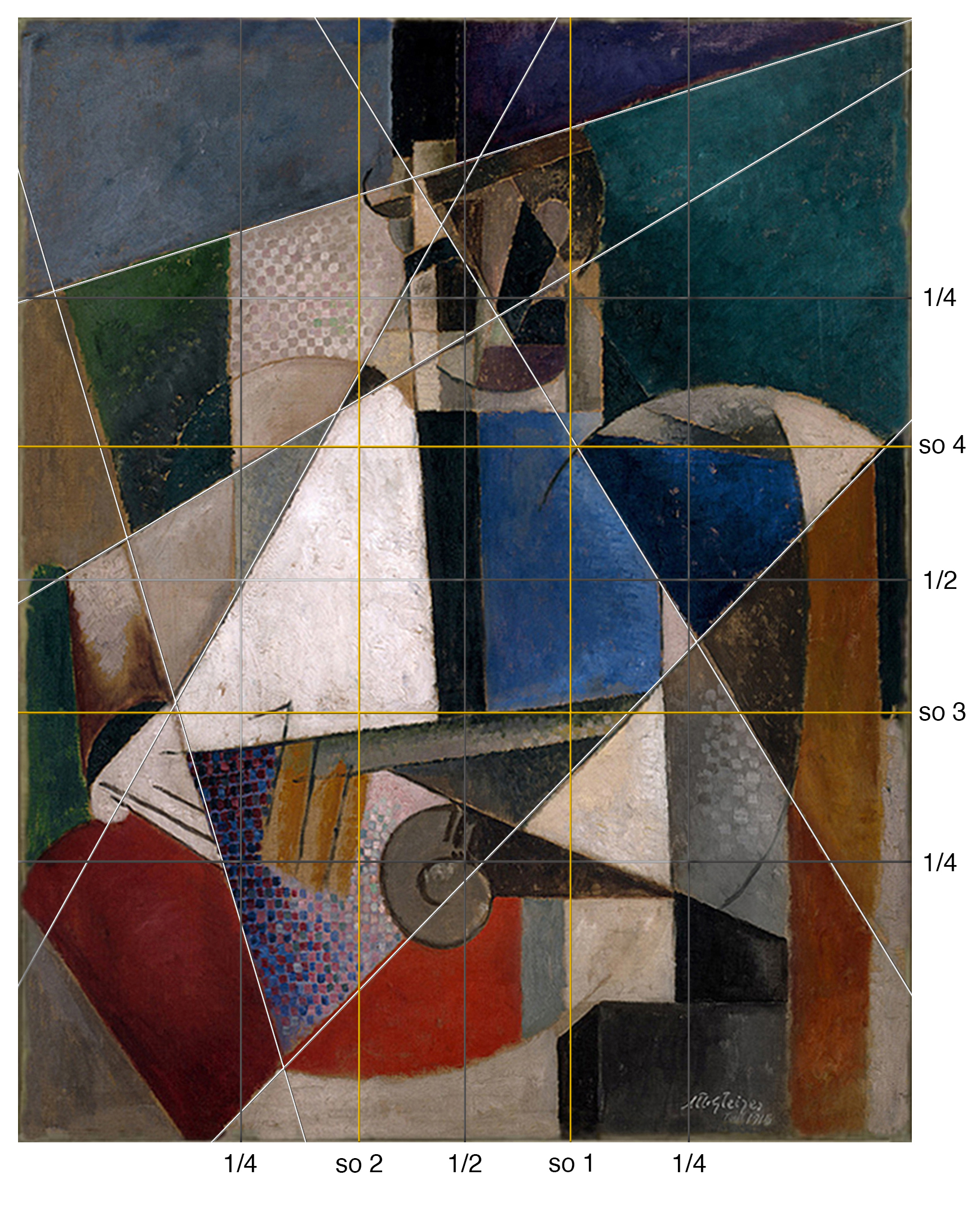
Albert Gleizes, Portrait of an Army Doctor, structural schematic overlay showing the Golden section, or Section d'Or (yellow lines), quarter grid (grey lines) and principle geometric structure lines (white lines)

Portrait of an Army Doctor is an oil painting on canvas with dimensions 119.8 cm × 95.1 cm (47.2 in × 37.4 in) inscribed Alb. Gleizes, Toul 1914, lower right. An early photograph of the work shows the inscribed date as 1914–15.

Gleizes's works from this period, just as those of the early 1920s, are "characterized by dynamic intersections of vertical, diagonal, horizontal and circular movements", writes art historian Daniel Robbins, "austere in touch but loaded with energetic pattern." Gleizes brings into practice an effect reminiscent of Divisionist theory via the incorporation of colored squares within three sections of the canvas, one of which is composed of alternating pigments of contrasting blues and reds. The use of blue, white and red in the overall composition recall the colors of the French flag. Such a display of patriotism was not uncommon among the Cubists, even leading up to the war. French flags can be seen in the works of Roger de La Fresnaye; Fourteenth of July, 1913–14 (Museum of Fine Arts, Houston, TX), and The Conquest of the Air, 1913 (Museum of Modern Art, New York). The Cubo-Futurist Gino Severini, too, included the French flag in his 1913 painting Train of the Wounded, 1913. While not depicting the flag itself, wartime works by Jean Metzinger dominantly exhibit blues and reds, along with army green, in such works as Soldat jouant aux échecs (Soldier at a Game of Chess), 1914–15, Smart Museum of Art, and Femme au miroir (Lady at her Dressing Table), April 1916.

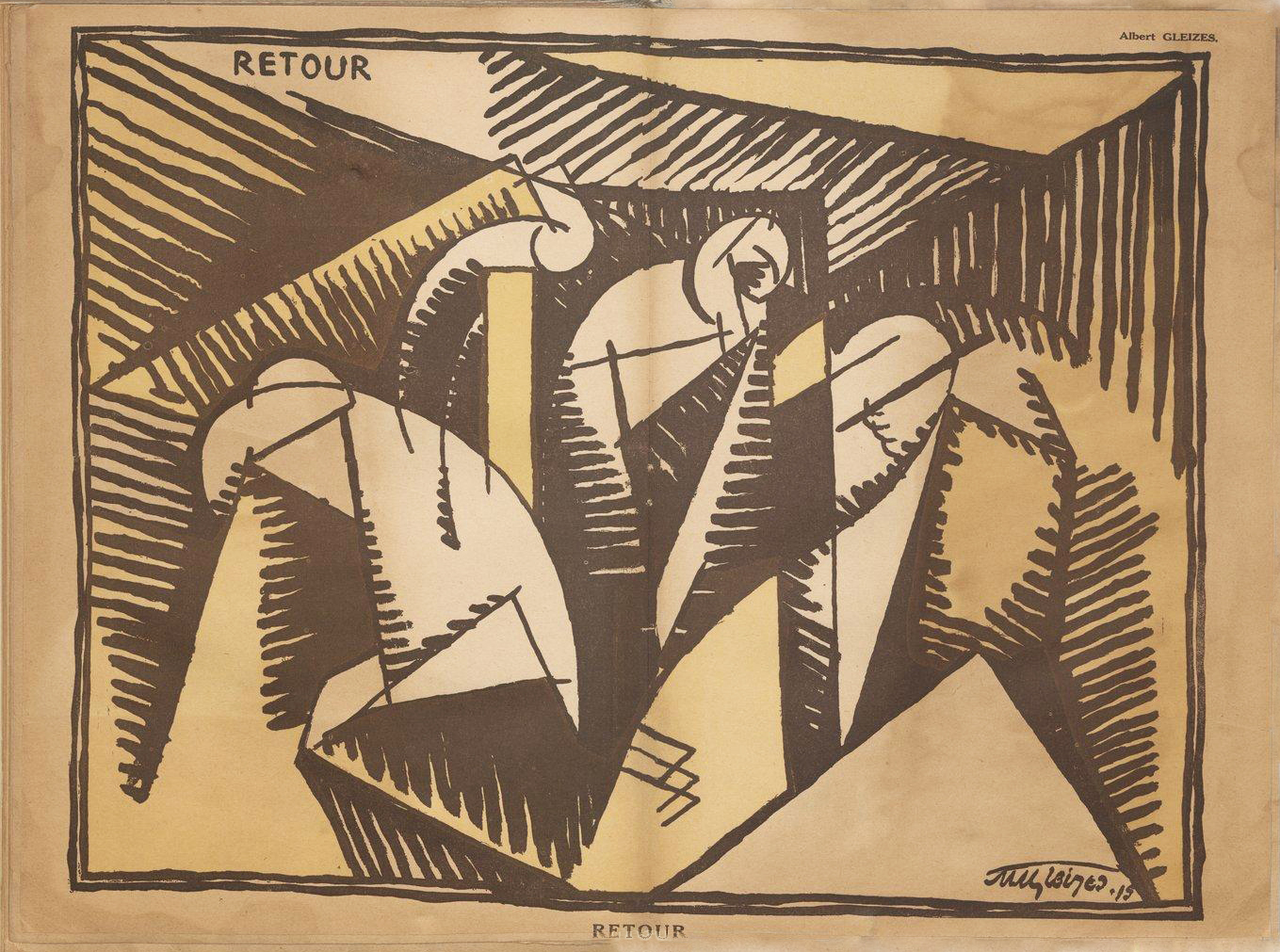
Albert Gleizes, 1915, Retour de Bois-le-Prêtre, wood engraving, 39 x 50 cm, published in Le mot, n. 20, 1 July 1915

In 1915 Gleizes published an article in Jean Cocteau's patriotic review, Le Mot in which he attacks critics who accuse the new tendencies in art of being unpatriotic. The final issue of Le Mot includes a sketch by Gleizes based on wounded soldiers returning from a battle at Bois le Prêtre.

Despite its descriptive title, the subject matter of Portrait of an Army Doctor has practically disappeared. The canvas is no longer analyzed or structured geometrically according to the golden ratio, though the armrest of the chair is treated as the beginning of a Fibonacci spiral. The masses of the composition are arranged in quasi-equilibrium. The center of the sitter's face is the superior vertex of a triangular construct that extends toward the outer edges of the canvas.

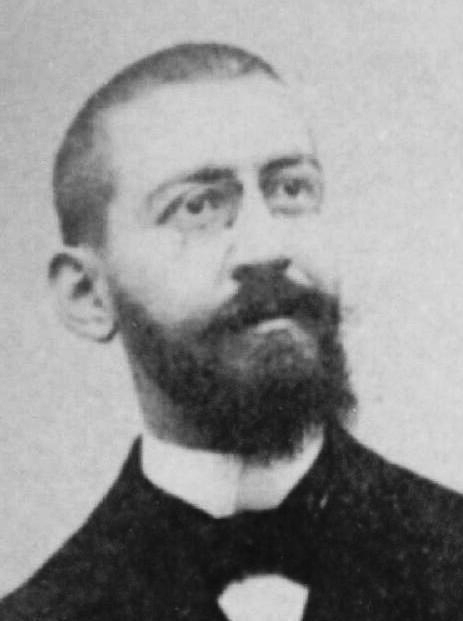
Dr. Mayer Lambert (1870-1943), Professor of Physiology, Faculty of Nancy

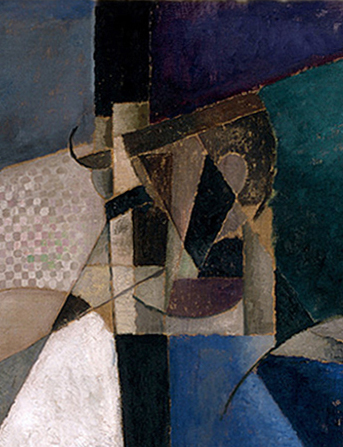
Albert Gleizes, 1914-15, Portrait of an Army Doctor (Portrait d'un médecin militaire), detail

The intersection of the two arcs that compose the shoulders is centered on the vertical axis. The source of light is undetermined, or omnidirectional, just as the vantage point of the artist, in accord with the Cubist principle of 'simultaneity' (or multiple perspective): "a succession of descriptive aspects of the external world... by giving a multiple series of appearances, each one seen in its own perspective", writes Gleizes, "a succession of descriptive states. Waking up, this eye lurched from one point of view to the other, jumped back again, and was again thrown into a state of excitement." Cubism, with its new geometry, its dynamism and multiple view-point perspective, not only represented a departure from Euclid's model, but it achieved, according to Gleizes and Metzinger, a better representation of the real world: one that was mobile and changing in time. For Gleizes, Cubism represented a "normal evolution of an art that was mobile like life itself".

Albert Gleizes, 1915, Study No. 5 for Portrait of an Army Doctor (Étude 5 pour Portrait d'un médecin militaire), graphite on paper, 24.4 x 18.6 cm, Solomon R. Guggenheim Museum, New York

Multiple perspective was in itself a protest against painting defined as an art based on space, that is to say, static. An aspiration towards mobility begins to appear and to appeal to the eye. The eye is required to enter into that collaboration which is necessary if it wishes to emerge from the torpor to which it had been reduced at the insistence of the single point perspective of the Renaissance; painting makes a legitimate claim to be regarded as an art of time ... Breaking up the plane into surfaces of different sizes reduced to geometrical forms. Sometimes certain indications of figures appear in this assemblage, obtained with the help of a few lines and several suggestive points. (Gleizes, 1927)

While depth perception and perspective have been subdued to a large extent, the primary structural lines appear to recede or converge toward a multitude of vanishing points located at infinity. Though, unlike those of classical perspective, these vanishing points are not placed on a given horizon (a theoretical line that represents the eye level of the observer), nor do they allow the viewer to reconstruct the relative distance of parts or features of an object. Rather, they are placed on various horizons. The viewer is observing a non-linear scene where the picture plane is not parallel to any of the scene's multiple axes, giving the appearance of different forms of calculated perspective.

Surfaces appear to overlap creating a sense of occlusion, but the resulting information is insufficient to allow the observer to recreate depth of field. By removing these optical cues, the geometrical method of perspective used to create the illusion of form, space and depth since the Renaissance, the artifice of an illusionistic trickery as Metzinger called it, Gleizes's aim was to arrive at what he perceived as 'truth', the constructive essence of the physical world.

So, now that we are in possession of the means (and I firmly believe that we are) we must pitilessly reject the image of the Renaissance that is addressed exclusively to the senses, but, at the same time, we should not fear, should the occasion present itself, an image determined by geometry, by the square, the right angle, because it, in its nature, corresponds to the higher stages. The Renaissance image, I repeat, bears no, or too little, relation to them; the new image will give more meaning and variety to the space. (Gleizes)

We are in the age of synthesis. An hour in the life of a man today raises more levels, insights, actions, than a year of that of any other century. That is what I try to say in my art. The rapid sketch of an Impressionist crystallised the fragility of a sensation; it was immobilized in his picture. The painting of today must crystallise a thousand sensations in an aesthetic order. And I see that for that there is no need to reveal other laws, other theorems with definitive forms. A beauty achieved through a mathematical order can only have a relative life; the universal kaleidoscope cannot be fitted into the framework of a system..." (Gleizes, c.1916, letter addressed to Henri-Martin Barzun)

From 1914 to the end of Gleizes's New York period—however nonrepresentational—works by the artist continued to be shaped by his personal experience, by the conviction that art was a social function, susceptible to theoretical formulation, and imbued with optimism. Gleizes's nonrepresentational paintings and those with an apparent visual basis existed side by side, differing only, writes Daniel Robbins, in "the degree of abstraction hidden by the uniformity with which they were painted and by the constant effort to tie the plastic realization of the painting to a specific, even unique, experience."

== Background ==
Jean Metzinger, 1914–15, Soldat jouant aux échecs (Soldier at a Game of Chess), oil on canvas, 81.3 x 61 cm, Smart Museum of Art

Many of the leading Cubists were mobilized at the outset of the First World War: Georges Braque, Fernand Léger, Duchamp-Villon, Roger de La Fresnaye, and Jean Metzinger, yet despite the radical interruption, they were able to continue producing styles of Cubism that extended beyond pre-war attitudes. Cubism evolved as a result of both nationalistic pressures and from the evasion of the atrocities of war. There came the need to diverge further away from the representation of things. As the divide between art and life grew, the need for a process of distillation (a process of purification) became increasingly ubiquitous across the spectrum of Cubist activity. Orderly qualities and autonomous purity became a prime concern. This tendency toward wholesale geometric abstraction from 1914 through the mid-1920s has been linked to broader ideological shift towards conservatism in both French society and culture.

Metzinger served very close to the front during World War I, as a medical aide, and was possibly with his surgical automobile when he painted Soldier at a Game of Chess (though evidence suggests the work may have been painted prior to his mobilization). However, very few of his works represent scenes associated with war. And rather than delving into the actual carnage of war, this painting evokes an idealized theory of war. Instead, his interest is captured by mathematical rationality, order, his faith in humanity and modernity. The war, however, is very present in this work, by the presence of the soldier and his engagement with chess, simultaneously an intellectual game and a battle.

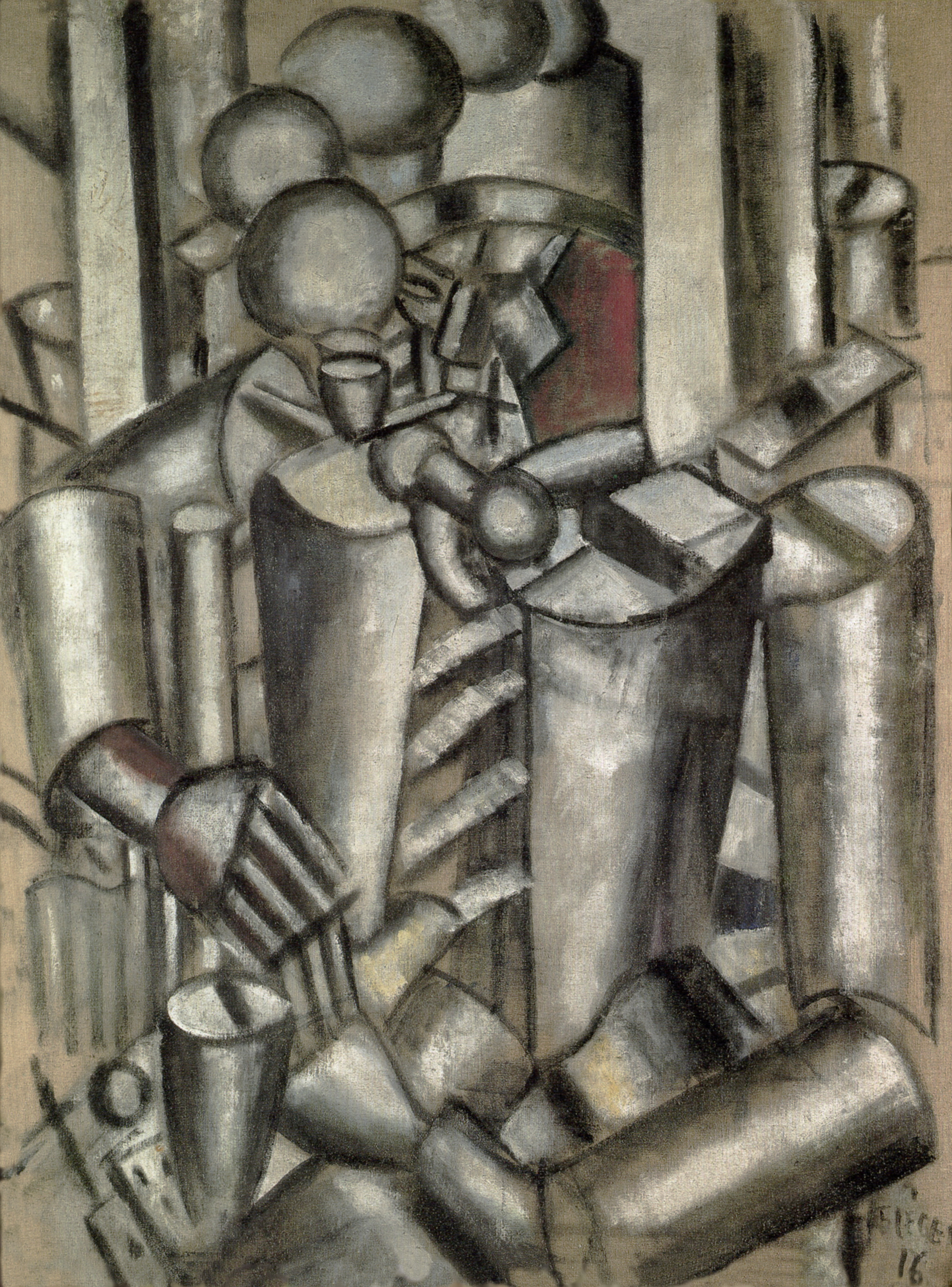
Fernand Léger, 1916, Soldier with a pipe (Le Soldat à la Pipe), oil on canvas, 130 x 97 cm, Kunstsammlung Nordrhein-Westfalen, Dùsseldorf

This period of profound reflection contributed to the constitution of a new mindset; a prerequisite for fundamental change. The flat surface became the starting point for a revaluation of the fundamental principles of painting. Rather than relying strictly on the intellect, the focus placed on the immediate experience of the senses, on the idea according to Gleizes, that form, 'changing the directions of its movement, will change its dimensions', while revealing the "basic elements" of painting, the "true, solid rules - rules which could be generally applied".

Fernand Léger was mobilized in October 1914, and served as a sapper close to the front in Forest of Argonne. He drew the various activities of his comrades during his free time, with virtually no possibility of working on canvas. Between the autumn of 1914 and 1917 he was able to produce only one work on canvas, Soldier with a pipe (Le Soldat à la Pipe).

Unlike the "Impressionism of form" and dissection of the subject by Pablo Picasso and Georges Braque, Gleizes attempted to create a synthetic art that incorporated social values. He strove to capture the absolute 'order' and 'truth' of his subject, believing in the Universality and superiority of rhythmic harmonies over subjective responses. These values had preoccupied the artist since his years at the Abbaye de Créteil, a self-supporting collective of artists and writers he co-founded during the fall of 1906 with Alexandre Mercereau, René Arcos, Henri-Martin Barzun, and Charles Vildrac.

=== Mobilization ===
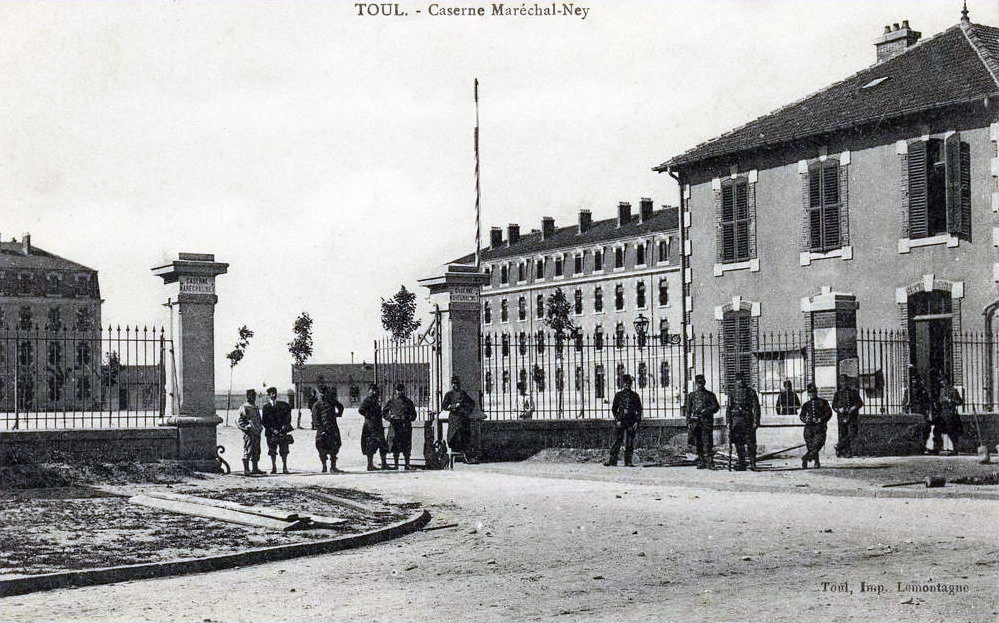
Toul, Caserne Maréchal Ney, c. 1915, where Gleizes was stationed during his mobilization

Gleizes had been conscripted at the outset of the war (August 1914) and sent to the garrison town of Toul, close to the Eastern front (120 km from Sainte-Menehould, where his close friend Jean Metzinger was mobilized) to serve in the 167e régiment d'infanterie (from which the 367e régiment d'infanterie was formed). He was stationed in the Caserne Maréchal-Ney (Plateau Saint-Georges), attached to the Service de Santé des Armées, in the infirmary of the unit. Upon giving his name to the receiving sergeant he was asked if he had any relation to the Cubist painter. When Gleizes answered that he was the Cubist painter he was told to step aside. Sergeant Raymond Vaufrey (soon to become a well-known paleontologist) happened to be an avid enthusiast of modern art. Shortly thereafter Gleizes was assigned the role of providing entertainment for the troops. His experience with artistic and literary activities at the Abbey of Créteil and the Association Ernest Renan, along with his connection to the distinguished author and actor Maxime Léry, may have helped secure the post. His close associates at the garrison included Carlos Salzedo, a harpist responsible for musical activities; the dentist Théo Morinaud, and early childhood friend from Courbevoie and possibly the subject of several pairings by Gleizes, including l'Homme au Balcon (Man on a Balcony), Philadelphia Museum of Art. Also stationed at Toul were the painters Georges Valmier, Paul Colin, and the composer Florent Schmitt. Gleizes activities as artistic and literary impresario at the fortress included monologues reciting classical, romantic and Symbolist poetry by Paul Fort, Jules Laforgue, Tristan Corbière, Arthur Rimbaud and Stéphane Mallarmé.

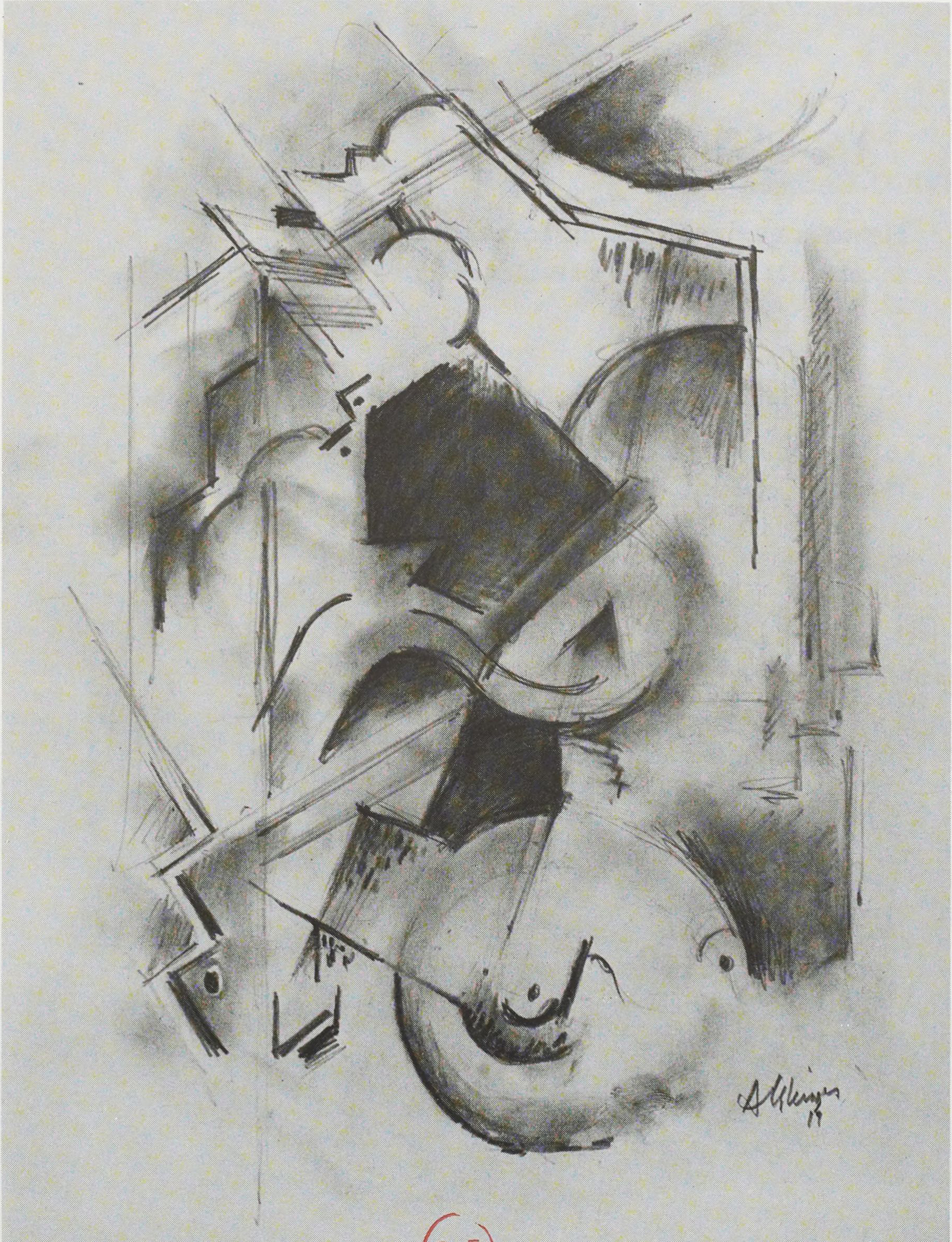
Albert Gleizes, 1914-15, Portrait de Florent Schmitt (Le Pianiste), pastel, 36 x 27 cm. This is a study for an oil on canvas titled Portrait de Florent Schmitt, 1914–15, 200 cm × 152 cm (79 in × 60 in). A similar work dated 1915 is in the Solomon R. Guggenheim Museum, New York.

Gleizes' mobilization was an obstacle to his production of artwork, though he was able to work on small scale, and ultimately produced one relatively large piece, Portrait of an Army Doctor.

The painter Gleizes, who wrote a book on Cubism, writes to a friend: "From Toul, advanced outpost on the Eastern border, I am sending you this card. There is no question of Cubism at the moment or simultanism. When will we speak of it again? When will we do it again? Soon I hope, and with the glory of having crushed the German felony, having extirpated the Prussian Hydra and to be able to return freely in French Alsace-Lorraine forever. I have absolute confidence in your effort, your mission." (Gleizes, L'Intransigeant, August 1914)

An admirer of his work, his commanding officer—the regimental surgeon portrayed by Gleizes in this painting—made arrangements so that Gleizes could continue to paint while mobilized at Toul. This work, painted at the outset of the Crystal Cubist period, was a precursor to Gleizes's abstract paintings of 1915–16. Portrait of an Army Doctor consists of broad, overlapping planes of brilliant color, dynamically intersecting vertical, diagonal, horizontal lines coupled with circular movements. This painting, along with his Portrait de Florent Schmitt, Le Chant de guerre (Solomon R. Guggenheim Museum), according to Gleizes, represented a break from both 'Cubism of analysis', and from the representation of volume undertaken during the first period of Cubism. He was now on a path that lead to 'synthesis', with its starting point in 'unity'.

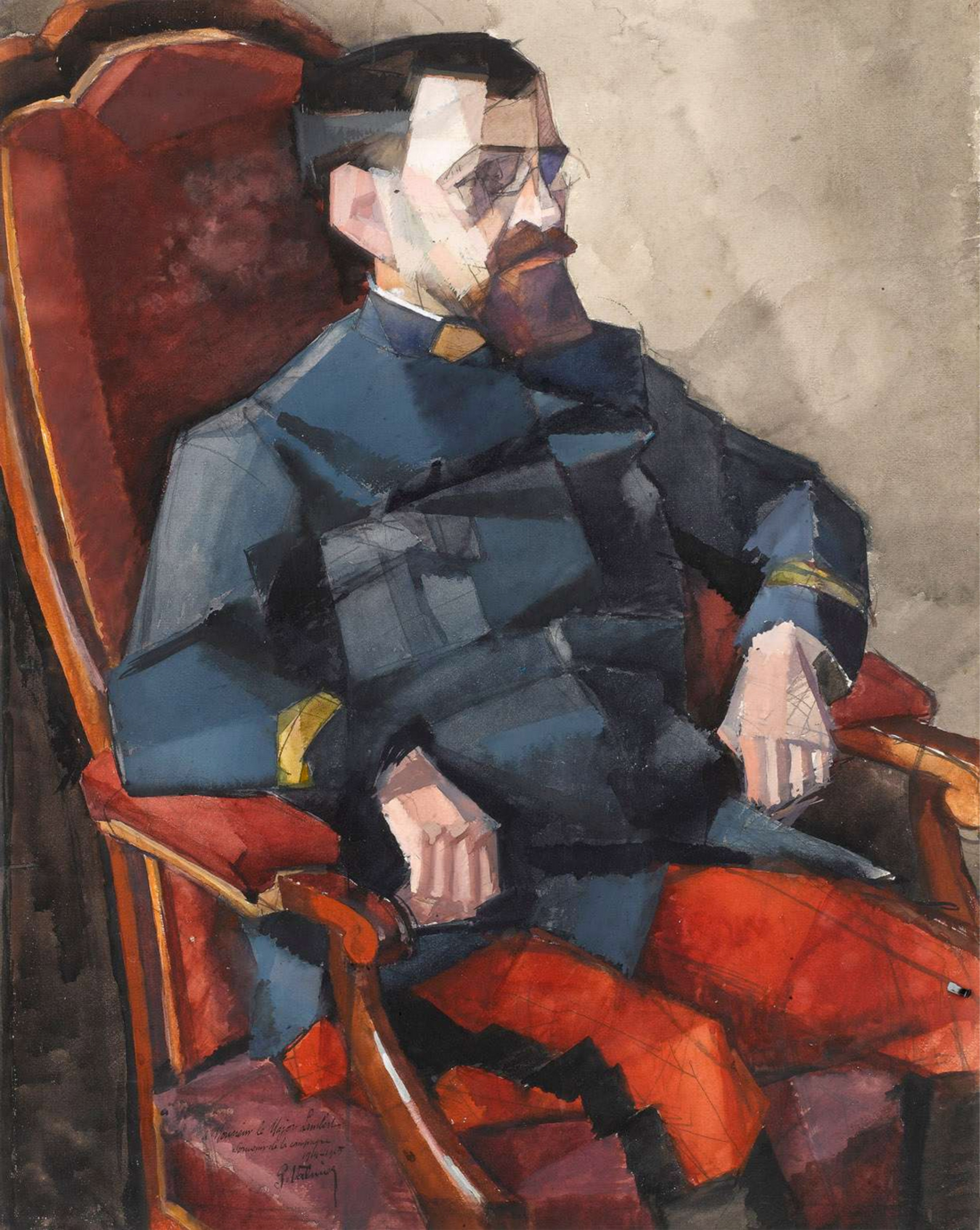
Georges Valmier, 1914-15, Portrait de Commandant Lambert (Portrait of Major Mayer-Simon Lambert), gouache and watercolor over pencil, 63.2 x 50.8 cm, The Triton Foundation, Netherlands

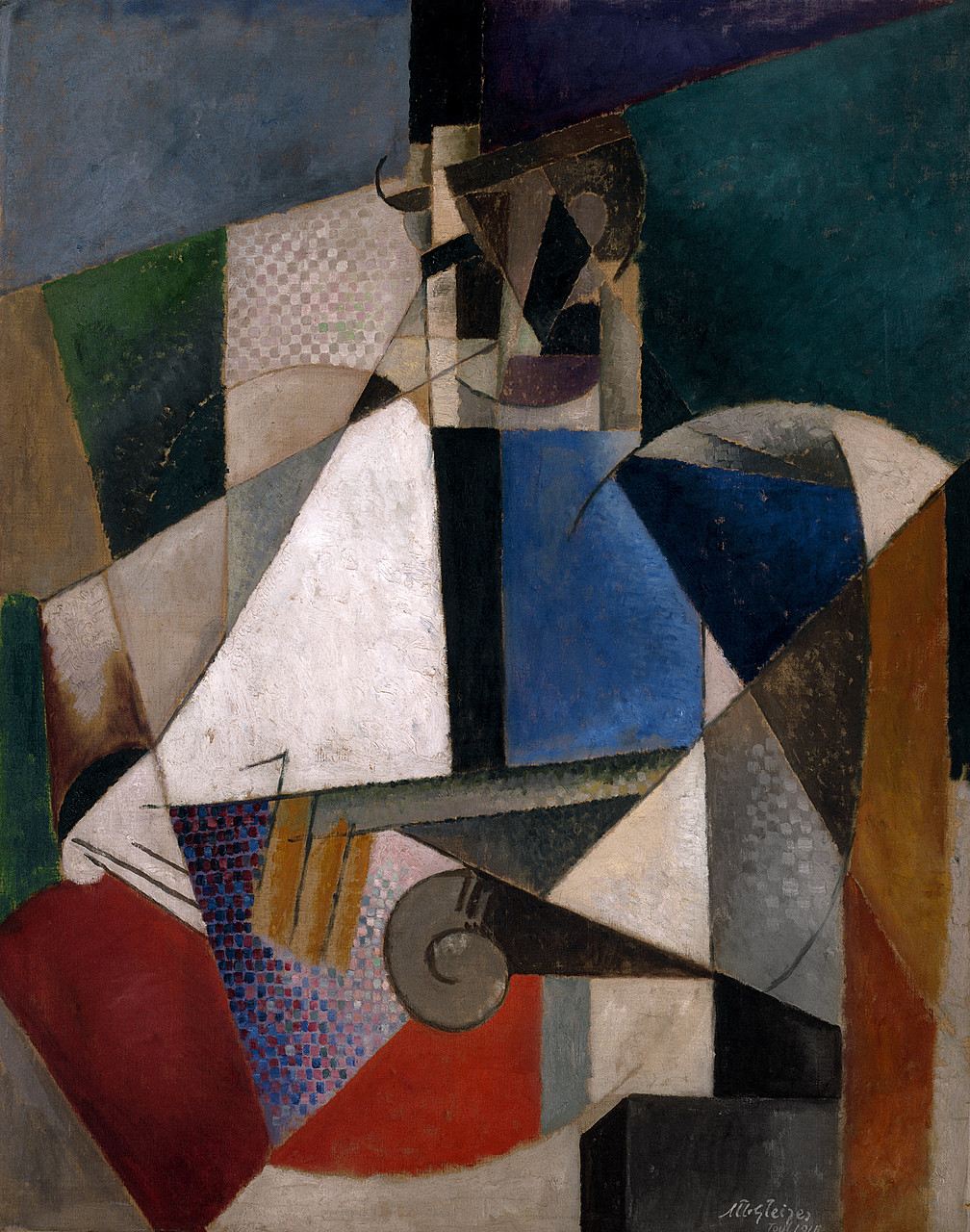
Albert Gleizes, 1914-15, Portrait of an Army Doctor (Portrait d'un médecin militaire), oil on canvas, 119.8 x 95.1 cm, Solomon R. Guggenheim Museum

This unity, and the highly crystalline geometricized materialization consisting of superimposed constituent planes, ultimately referred to by the French poet and art critic Maurice Raynal as Crystal Cubism, would soon be described by Gleizes in La Peinture et ses lois (1922–23), as 'simultaneous movements of translation and rotation of the plane'. The synthetic factor was taken furthest of all from within the Cubists by Gleizes. Basing himself on his 1915 abstractions, Gleizes sought to clarify his methods further in La Peinture et ses lois, deducing the fundamental principles of painting from the picture plane, its proportions, the movement of the human eye and the universal physical laws. These theoretical postulates, later referred to as translation-rotation, according to Robbins, rank "with the writings of Mondrian and Malevich as one of the most thorough expositions of the principles of abstract art, which in his case entailed the rejection not only of representation but also of geometric forms".

Many drawings, gouaches and watercolors were realized by the artist in and around Toul. He kept the landscapes and portrait sketches in a drawer, until one day they were discover by a private (a miner) who removed them all only to tack them on the wall with toothpicks for an exhibition. Gleizes remarked that educated or cultured soldiers had more difficulty with his paintings than those with little or no intellectual pretensions. Portrait d'un médecin militaire generated mixed responses. The Professor of Physiology from the Faculty of Nancy in charge of the infirmary at Toul, Dr. Lambert, was more enthusiastic about his portrait by Valmier than that of Gleizes:

The portrait that he [Valmier] made of the Doctor was excellent, a very good likeness that remained in the classical idiom. But for myself, I wanted to remain faithful to Cubism and not to play games with my own convictions. So the portrait I envisaged was a little surprising for the good doctor's habits of mind. He did not conceal his way of thinking, but he let me do what I wanted. I made of him, from memory, a large number of drawings in pencil, in pen and ink, in ink wash. I made a series of watercolors and gouaches. When he saw them, the model was pretty shaken. When my studies seemed to be ready, I did the oil painting. I painted the portrait in the Marshall Ney's room. I nailed a canvas I had ordered from Nancy to the wall and got down to work. When it was finished, it received the approval of my friends, the unsophisticated ones, who were all able to recognise Dr. Lambert perfectly well. The others were divided. As for the interested party, he refused, definitely, but amicably, to take possession of it. To please me, he only accepted the final little gouache which I had used for the execution of the canvas. (Albert Gleizes, Souvenirs, c. 1942)

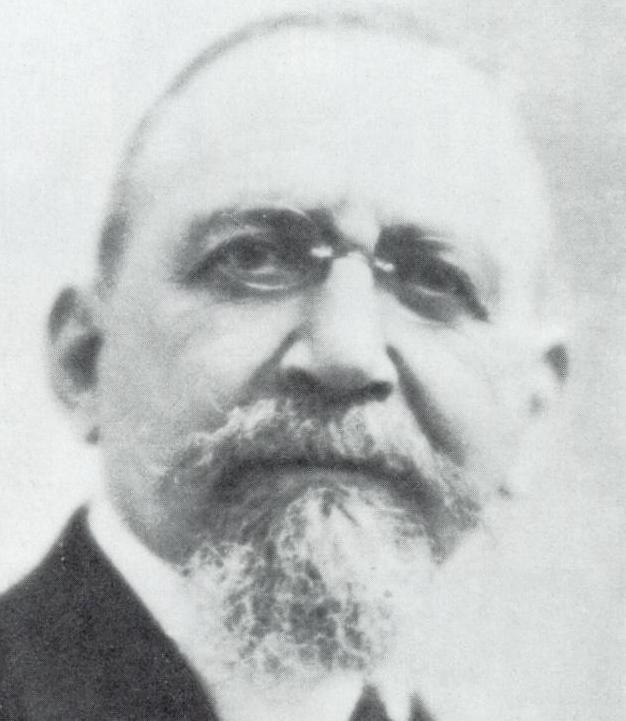
Doctor Mayer Lambert (1870-1943), Professor of Physiology, Faculty of Nancy

The Portrait d'un médecin militaire, commissioned by Dr. Lambert, is "impressive" writes art historian Peter Brooke:

"Although Gleizes tells the story lightheartedly, it is a serious, almost tragic painting, in which the subject (the poor Dr. Lambert) has almost disappeared—reduced to a presence rather than a likeness—in a construction in which vertical parallel lines, and therefor a static, monumental character, prevail. Together with the second Portrait of Florent Schmitt (the Chant de guerre), it could be described as the furthest point reached by this Cubism striving towards the laws of the 'object'—the properties of the picture space itself—but still taking the 'subject'—the thing represented—as its starting point." (Brooke, 2001, p. 46)

Shortly thereafter, Jean Cocteau asked Gleizes to design the set and costumes for the William Shakespeare play, A Midsummer Night's Dream, along with Valmier.

=== Demobilization ===
Albert Gleizes, Portrait d'un médecin militaire reproduced on the cover of the Gleizes catalogue raisonné, Vol. 1, Somogy, 1998, Paris

Gleizes was demobilized, with the help of his soon to be wife Juliette Roche, in September 1915.

Gleizes published an article in Ricciotto Canudo's Montjoie entitled Cubisme et la tradition. It was through the intermediary of Cuando that Gleizes met the artist Juliette Roche. She was a childhood friend of Jean Cocteau and the daughter of an influential politician of the 3rd Republic, Jules Roche.

During the months of autumn, following his demobilization in 1915, Gleizes married Juliette Roche and moved to New York. There they were met by Carlos Salzedo, Francis Picabia, Man Ray, Marcel Duchamp, and Jean Crotti (who would eventually marry Suzanne Duchamp). Marcel Duchamp had emigrated to New York several months earlier after being judged physically unfit for his service in the military. Shortly after his arrival, Gleizes, accompanied by Salzedo, frequented jazz clubs in Harlem. With all it had to offer, New York had a strong impact on the artist's production, leading to abstract works virtually free of visual subject matter.

Many works by Gleizes painted at Toul between 1914 and 1915 were auctioned in New York, for the occasion of the late John Quinn exhibition and sale of modern and ultra-modern art at the American Art Galleries, conducted by Bernet and Parke, with a catalogue published by American Art Association, New York, 1927.

== Recent exhibitions ==
Le cubisme, 17 October 2018 to 25 February 2019, Centre Pompidou, the first large-scale exhibition devoted to Cubism in France since 1973, with over 300 works on display. The 1973 exhibition, Les Cubistes, included over 180 works and was held at the Musée d'Art Moderne de la Ville de Paris and Galerie des Beaux-Arts, Bordeaux. The motivation for the Pompidou exhibition resides in broadening the scope of Cubism, usually focused on Georges Braque and Pablo Picasso, to include the major contributions of the Salon Cubists, the Section d'Or, and others who participated in the over-all movement. The exhibition is held at Kunstmuseum Basel, from 31 March to 5 August 2019.

== See also ==
- List of works by Albert Gleizes
