= Soldier at a Game of Chess =

Painting by Jean Metzinger

- Soldat jouant aux échecs (French)
- Artist: Jean Metzinger
- Year: 1914–1915
- Medium: Oil on canvas
- Dimensions: 81.3 cm × 61 cm (32 in × 24 in)
- Location: Smart Museum of Art, University of Chicago. Gift of John L. Strauss, Jr. in memory of his father John L. Strauss, Accession No.: 1985.21, Chicago

Soldier at a Game of Chess (in French Soldat jouant aux échecs, or Le Soldat à la partie d'échecs, also referred to as Joueur d'échecs), is a painting by the French artist Jean Metzinger. While serving as a medical orderly during World War I in Sainte-Menehould, France, Metzinger bore witness to the ravages of war firsthand. Rather than depicting such horrors, Metzinger chose to represent a poilu sitting at a game of chess, smoking a cigarette. The military subject of this painting is possibly a self-portrait.

During March 1915, Metzinger was called to serve the military, and was invalided out of service later that year. Soldier at a Game of Chess was painted either before or during his mobilization. Evidence found in a letter by Metzinger addressed to Léonce Rosenberg suggests the work was painted before his March 1915 mobilization, and possibly late 1914.

This distilled form of Cubism, soon to be known as Crystal Cubism, is consistent with Metzinger's shift, between 1914 and 1916, towards a strong emphasis on large, flat surface activity, with overlapping geometric planes. The manifest primacy of the underlying architectonics of the composition, entrenched in the abstract, controls practically all of the elements of the painting. Color remains primordial but is moderate and sharply delineated by boundary conditions.

The painting—a gift of John L. Strauss, Jr. in memory of his father John L. Strauss—forms part of the permanent collection at the Smart Museum of Art, located on the campus of the University of Chicago in Chicago, Illinois.

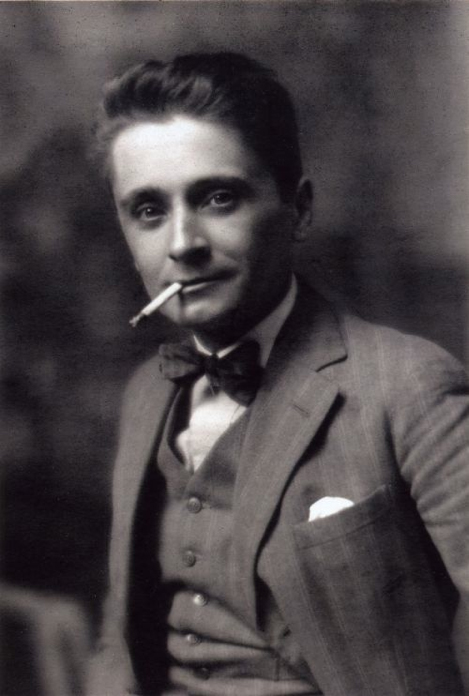
Jean Metzinger, circa 1912

== Description ==
Soldier at a Game of Chess, initialed "JM" and signed "JMetzinger" (lower right), is an oil painting on canvas with dimensions 81.3 x 61 cm (32 x 24 in.). The vertical composition is painted in a geometrically advanced Cubist style, representing a solitary French soldier playing a game of chess. He wears a military hat (képi) and bears a cigarette in his mouth. Because of this, Joann Moser suggests that this may be a self-portrait. Images of Metzinger often depicted him with a cigarette in his mouth: consider for example Robert Delaunay's 1906 Portrait of Metzinger (Man with a Tulip); Suzanne Phocas, Portrait de Metzinger, 1926.

Jean Metzinger, c.1915, L'infirmière (The Nurse), published in l'Elan, Number 9, 12 February 1916

Jean Metzinger, Soldat jouant aux échecs (Soldier at a Game of Chess), detail head

The soldier's head and hat are seen in both frontal side views simultaneously. His facial features are eminently stylized, simple, geometric, resting on rounded shoulders delineated by a rectangular structure superimposed with elemental monochromatic planes that compose the background. Depth of field is practically nonexistent. Blues, reds, green and black dominate the composition. The table—treated in faux bois, or trompe-l'œil—and the chessboard are practically seen from above, while the chess pieces are observed from the side; his right hand is fused within.

"Direct reference to observed reality" is present, but the emphasis is placed on the self-sufficiency of the painting as an object unto itself. "Orderly qualities" and the "autonomous purity" of the composition are a prime concern.

The overall composition is highly crystalline in its geometricized materialization, consisting of superimposed synthetic planes; something Albert Gleizes would later refer to, in La Peinture et ses lois (1922), as "simultaneous movements of translation and rotation of the plane". Gleizes too had been working along similar lines during his mobilization at Toul, where he painted Portrait of an Army Doctor (Portrait d'un médecin militaire), Solomon R. Guggenheim Museum. The synthetic factor was ultimately taken furthest of all from within the Cubists by Gleizes.

=== Mobilization ===
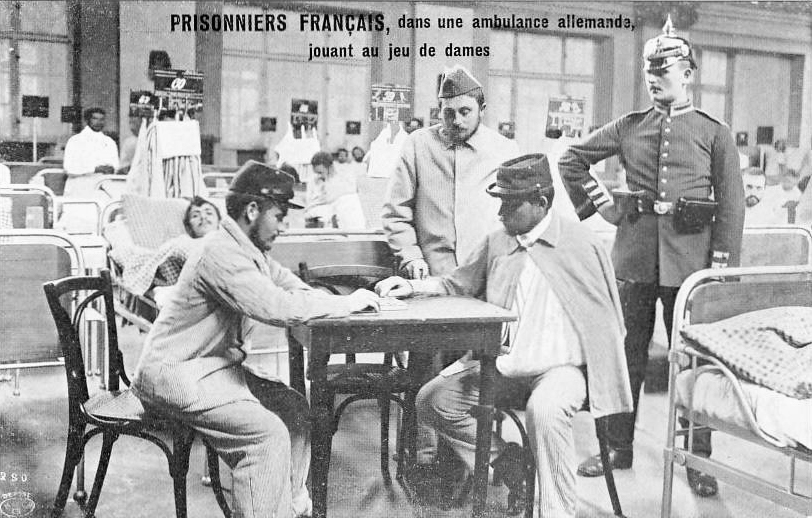
French prisoners playing checkers in a German hospital during World War I

The number 24 on the soldier's collar represents the 24e régiment d'infanterie. That regiment participated in a brutal offensive on 25 May 1915 in Aix-Noulette, where contact with a bitter enemy caused unusually heavy losses. Metzinger had been stationed further south of the devastated area. The town of Sainte-Menehould, located south of the Forest of Argonne, became a command and control center of the Marne.

From January 1915, St. Menehould was the command post of the IIIe armée française under General Maurice Sarrail. The city suffered its first bombing campaign by canon the same year. Thereafter, aircraft and zeppelins took over the skies. In September 1915 the successful counter-offensive moved the front closer to the German border.

== Crystal Cubism ==
The Cubist considerations manifested prior to the outset of World War I—such as the fourth dimension, dynamism of modern life, the occult, and Henri Bergson's concept of duration—had now been vacated, replaced by a purely formal reference frame. This clarity and sense of order spread to almost all of the artists under contract with Léonce Rosenberg—including Metzinger, Juan Gris, Jacques Lipchitz, Henri Laurens, Auguste Herbin, Joseph Csaky and Gino Severini—leading to the descriptive term 'Crystal Cubism', coined by the critic Maurice Raynal.

By its very date of execution, Metzinger's Soldier at a Game of Chess was precursor to a style that would become known as Crystal Cubism.

Comparisons have been made between war-time works of Metzinger and Juan Gris. These works were created within a specific context, a particular timeframe, a relatively restrained milieu, and influenced by a diverse grouping of factors. Metzinger's milieu at the time included his close friend Juan Gris. Both artists (with Lipchitz) exchanged ideas and worked together in Paris and Beaulieu-lès-Loches. Despite theoretical or conceptual differences, the works by these artists (and practically all those who exhibited at Rosenberg's Galerie de L'Effort Moderne) bear striking similarities.

The 'Latin' virtues of clarity and order were indeed dominants in the recent works of most who exhibited. Nowhere was this more so than is the works of three artists who had been in close contact with one another from 1916... the painters Gris and Jean Metzinger, and the sculptor Jacques Lipchitz... It is above all the wartime work of these three Cubists that can be analysed as a move towards order alongside as process of distillation. (Green, 1987, p. 25)

The new aesthetic unity associated with the underlying geometric structure of the works created by these artists is what would lead to the appellation Crystal Cubism. Metzinger and Gris were at the forefront, among the leaders of this second phase of Cubism.

Jean Metzinger, 1914–15, Soldier at a Game of Chess, 81.3 x 61 cm, Smart Museum of Art

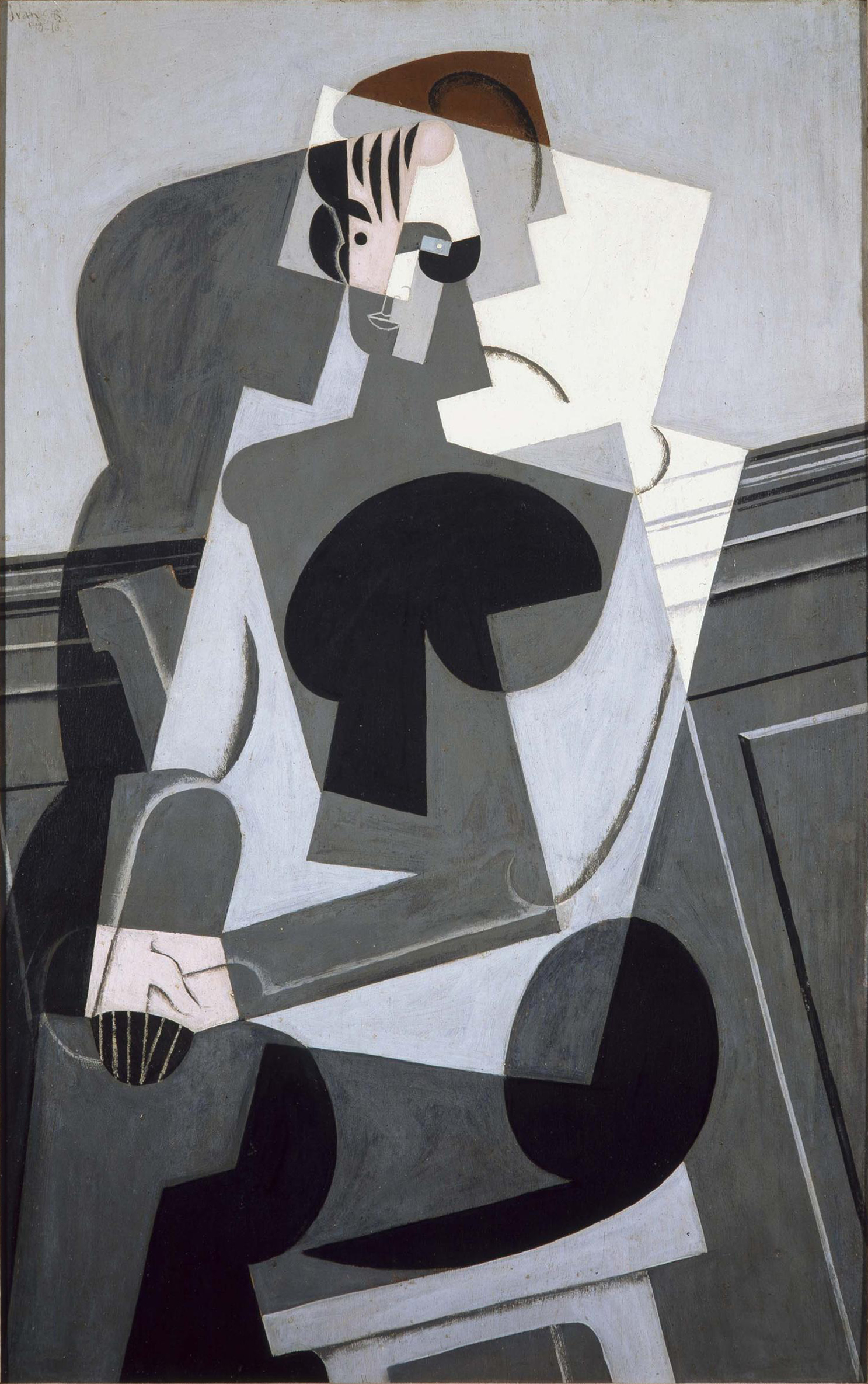
Juan Gris, October 1916, Portrait of Josette Gris, 116 x 73 cm, Museo Reina Sofia

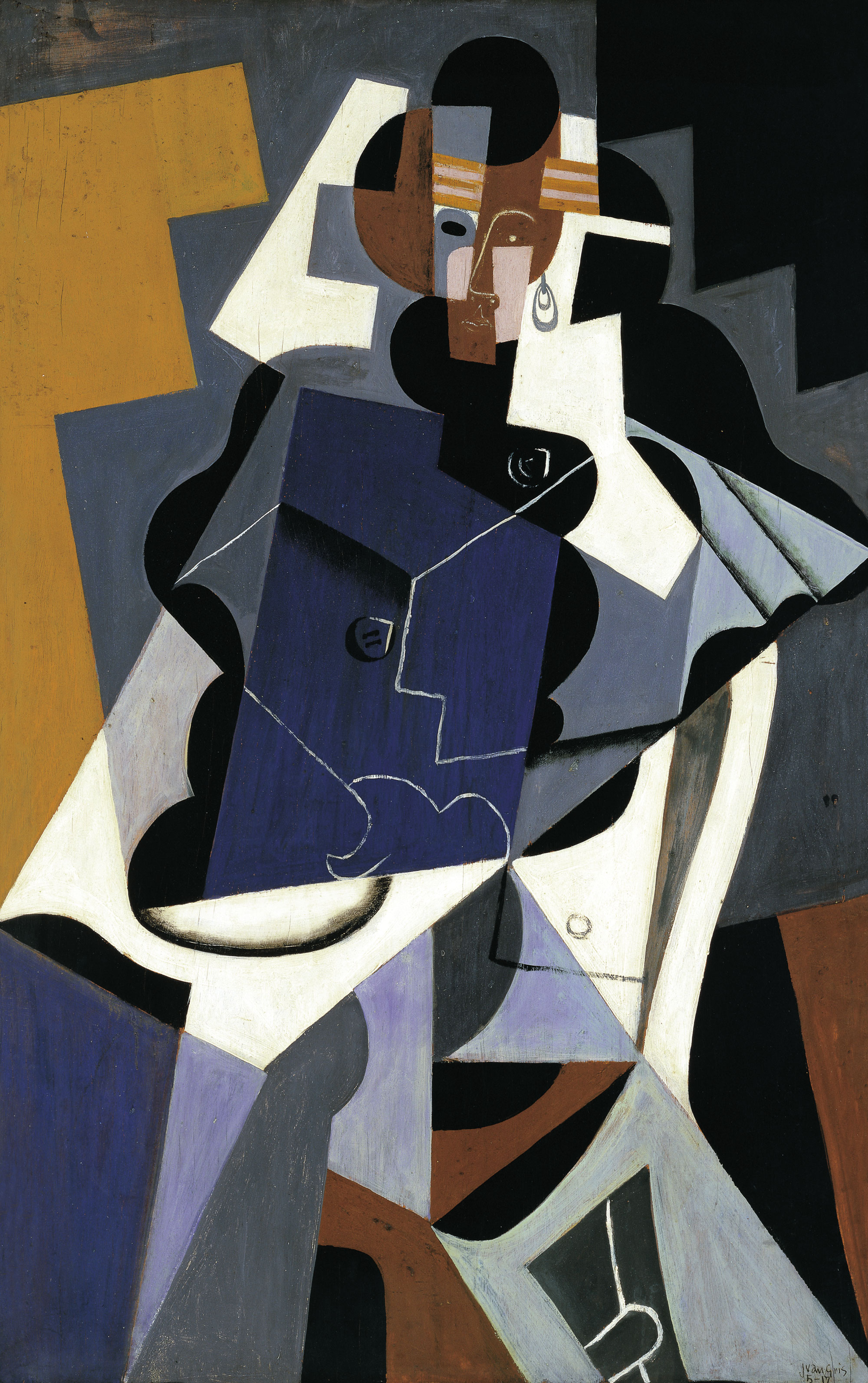
Juan Gris, 1917, Seated Woman (Mujer sentada), 116 × 73 cm, Thyssen-Bornemisza Museum

In Crystal Cubist works, the distinction between the background and the figure are blurred. Rather than gradients of tone or color, the works are painted with flat, uniform sections of tone and color. Though highly abstract in overall construction, objects or elements of the real world are present. The primacy of the manifest geometric manifold, the angular juxtaposition of the surface planes, are distinct features of this second phase of Cubism. This reductionist style is consistent with a process of distillation otherwise auxiliary before the war.

During 1916, Sunday discussions at the studio of Lipchitz, included Metzinger, Gris, Pablo Picasso, Diego Rivera, Henri Matisse, Amedeo Modigliani, Pierre Reverdy, André Salmon, Max Jacob, and Blaise Cendrars. Metzinger and Gris were in close contact.

Jean Metzinger, 1914–15, Soldat jouant aux échecs (Soldier at a Game of Chess), detail chessboard and table

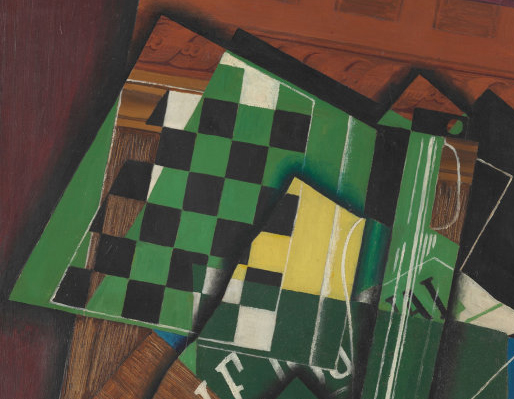
Juan Gris, September 1915, Jeu d'échecs (The Checkerboard), oil on canvas, 92.1 x 73 cm, Art Institute of Chicago (detail)

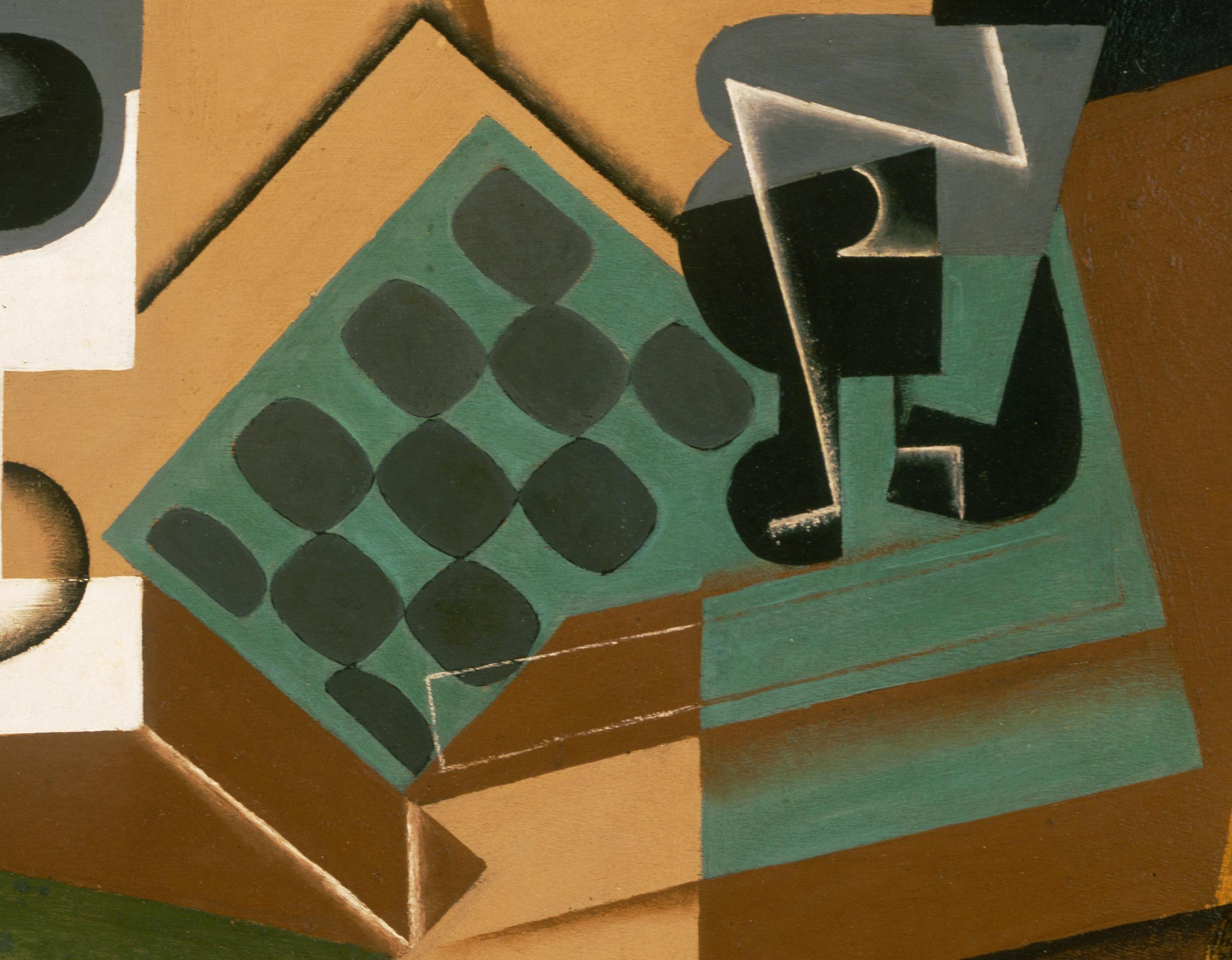
Juan Gris, 1917, Chessboard, Glass, and Dish, Philadelphia Museum of Art (detail)

In a letter written to Albert Gleizes in Barcelona during the war, dated 4 July 1916, Metzinger writes:

After two years of study I have succeeded in establishing the basis of this new perspective I have talked about so much. It is not the materialist perspective of Gris, nor the romantic perspective of Picasso. It is rather a metaphysical perspective—I take full responsibility for the word. You can't begin to imagine what I've found out since the beginning of the war, working outside painting but for painting. The geometry of the fourth space has no more secret for me. Previously I had only intuitions, now I have certainty. I have made a whole series of theorems on the laws of displacement [déplacement], of reversal [retournement] etc. I have read Schoute, Rieman (sic), Argand, Schlegel etc.

The actual result? A new harmony. Don't take this word harmony in its ordinary [banal] everyday sense, take it in its original [primitif] sense. Everything is number. The mind [esprit] hates what cannot be measured: it must be reduced and made comprehensible.

That is the secret. There in nothing more to it [pas de reste à l'opération]. Painting, sculpture, music, architecture, lasting art is never anything more than a mathematical expression of the relations that exist between the internal and the external, the self [le moi] and the world. (Metzinger, 4 July 1916)

The 'new perspective' according to Daniel Robbins, "was a mathematical relationship between the ideas in his mind and the exterior world". The 'fourth space' for Metzinger was the space of the mind.

In a second letter to Gleizes, dated 26 July 1916, Metzinger writes:

If painting was an end in itself it would enter into the category of the minor arts which appeal only to physical pleasure... No. Painting is a language—and it has its syntax and its laws. To shake up that framework a bit to give more strength or life to what you want to say, that isn't just a right, it's a duty; but you must never lose sight of the End. The End, however, isn't the subject, nor the object, nor even the picture—the End, it is the idea. (Metzinger, 26 July 1916)

Continuing, Metzinger mentions the differences between himself and Juan Gris:

Someone from whom I feel ever more distant is Juan Gris. I admire him but I cannot understand why he wears himself out with decomposing objects. Myself, I am advancing towards synthetic unity and I don't analyze any more. I take from things what seems to me to have meaning and be most suitable to express my thought. I want to be direct, like Voltaire. No more metaphors. Ah those stuffed tomatoes of all the St-Pol-Roux of painting.

Some of the ideas expressed in these letters to Gleizes were reproduced in an article written by Paul Dermée, published in the magazine SIC in 1919, but the existence of letters themselves remained unknown until the mid-1980s.

From 1916, Lipchitz, Gris and Metzinger had been in close contact with one another. The three had just signed contracts with the dealer, art collector and gallery owner Léonce Rosenberg. It is the work of these three artists, executed during the war, that can be analyzed as a process of distillation in a shift towards order and purity. This process would continue through 1918 when the three spent part of the summer together in Beaulieu-lès-Loches to escape the bombardment of Paris.

At an opening held at the Musée National d'Art Moderne in Paris, on 9 June 1947, Léonce Rosenberg related his impressions to Hélène Bauret:

In the painting "La Tricoteuse", hanging next to works by Gris, Metzinger reveals himself more of a painter, more natural, more flexible [plus souple] than Gris. Often, Gris would tell me: "Ah! If I could brush [brosser] like the French!"

Metzinger's radical geometrization of form as an underlying architectural basis for his 1914–15 compositions is already visible in his work circa 1912–13, in paintings such as Au Vélodrome (1912) and Le Fumeur (1913). Where before, the perception of depth had been greatly reduced, now, the depth of field was no greater than a bas-relief.

Jean Metzinger, c.1913, Le Fumeur (Man with Pipe), oil on canvas, 129.7 x 96.68 cm, Carnegie Museum of Art

Jean Metzinger, 1914–15, Soldat jouant aux échecs (Soldier at a Game of Chess), oil on canvas, 81.3 x 61 cm, Smart Museum of Art

Metzinger's evolution toward synthesis has its origins in the configuration of flat squares, trapezoidal and rectangular planes that overlap and interweave, a "new perspective" in accord with the "laws of displacement". In the case of Le Fumeur Metzinger filled in these simple shapes with gradations of color, wallpaper-like patterns and rhythmic curves. So too in Au Vélodrome. But the underlying armature upon which all is built is palpable. Vacating these non-essential features would lead Metzinger on a path towards Crystal Cubism: works created before the War, and after the artist's demobilization as a medical orderly during the war, such as Femme au miroir, private collection; Landscape with Open Window (1915) Musée des Beaux-Arts de Nantes; Femme à la dentelle (1916) Musée d'Art Moderne de la Ville de Paris; Summer (1916) Statens Museum for Kunst; Le goûter (1917) Galerie Daniel Malingue; Tête de femme (1916–17) private collection; Femme devant le miroir (c. 1914) private collection; Femme au miroir (1916–17) Donn Shapiro collection; Maison cubistes au bord de l'eau (1916); and Femme et paysage à l'aqueduc (1916).

If the beauty of a painting depends solely on its pictorial qualities: retain only certain elements, those that seem to suit our expressive needs, then with these elements, build a new object, an object which we can adapt to the surface of the painting without subterfuge. For that object to look like something known, I am increasingly considering not to be useful. For me it is enough for it to be "well made", for there to be a perfect accord between the parts and the whole. (Jean Metzinger, quoted in Au temps des Cubistes, 1910–1920)

== Wartime and after ==
Healing the wound of the psyche that nurtures the talent of an artist, would destroy his artistic production (Jean Metzinger)

Following the declaration of war in August 1914, many artists were mobilized, almost simultaneously: Metzinger, Gleizes, Braque, Léger, de La Fresnaye, Georges Valmier and Duchamp-Villon. Each found the space and time to make art, sustaining differing types of Cubism (primarily sketches) during the war years. They discovered a ubiquitous link between the Cubist syntax (beyond pre-war attitudes) and that of the novelty and anonymity of mechanized warfare. Cubism evolved as much a result of an evasion of the inconceivable atrocities of war as of nationalistic pressures. Along with the evasion came the need to diverge further and further away from the depiction of things. As the rift between art and life grew, so too came the burgeoning need for a process of distillation. Following the armistice and the series of exhibitions at Galerie de L'Effort Moderne, the rift between art and life—and the overt distillation that came with it—had become the canon of Cubist orthodoxy; and it would persist with the peace that followed.

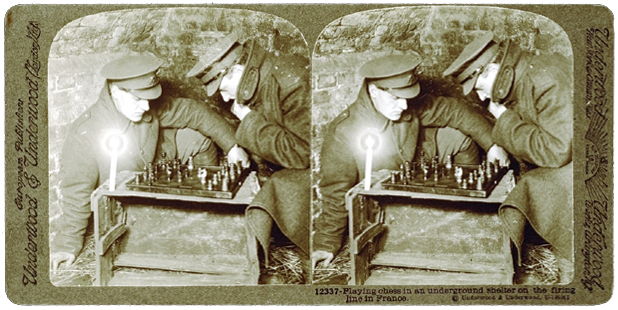
Soldiers playing chess in an underground shelter on the firing line in France, WWI, stereoscopic image

Metzinger served very close to the front during World War I as a medical aide, and was probably with his surgical automobile when Soldier at a Game of Chess was painted. However, very few of his works represent scenes associated with war. And rather than delving into the actual carnage of war, this painting evokes an idealized theory of war. Instead, his interest is captured by mathematical rationality, order, his faith in humanity and modernity. The war, however, is very present in this work, by the presence of the soldier and his engagement with chess, simultaneously an intellectual game and a battle. The soldier plays an abstract strategy game in which, whatever his strategy, his existence is adroitly dependent on non-deterministic results of his tactical decisions. His role is to minimize luck and the apparition of undesirable possibilities. As J. Mark Thompson wrote in his article "Defining the Abstract":

There is an intimate relationship between such games and puzzles: every board position presents the player with the puzzle, What is the best move?, which in theory could be solved by logic alone. A good abstract game can therefore be thought of as a "family" of potentially interesting logic puzzles, and the play consists of each player posing such a puzzle to the other. Good players are the ones who find the most difficult puzzles to present to their opponents.

Jean Metzinger, invitation card for the exhibition at Léonce Rosenberg's Galerie de L'Effort Moderne, January 1919

The sculptures of Lipchitz, Laurens and Csaky, and the paintings of Gris, Severini and Gleizes represented Cubism in its most distilled form between 1916 and 1920. However, by the time his exhibition at the Galerie de L'Effort Moderne at the outset of 1919—just as before the war—Metzinger was considered one of the leaders of the movement. His paintings at this exhibition were perceived as highly significant. Images were now created solely out of the imagination of the artist (or virtually so), independent of any visual starting point. Observed reality and all that is referred to in life are no longer needed as foundation for artistic production. The synthetic manipulation of abstract geometric shapes, or "mathematical expression of the relations that exist between the le moi and the world" (in Metzinger's words), was the ideal metaphysical starting point. Only afterwards would those structures be made to denote objects of predilection.

Jean Metzinger, 1914–15, Soldat jouant aux échecs (Soldier at a Game of Chess), oil on canvas, 81.3 x 61 cm, Smart Museum of Art

Jean Metzinger, April 1916, Femme au miroir (Lady at her Dressing Table), oil on canvas, 92.4 x 65.1 cm, private collection

Indeed, the wartime distillation of Metzinger's Cubism came with an acceleration in the type of games that could be played tactically with paradox by manipulating conflicting predications of planimetric flatness and the perspectival depth of space. This game playing would culminate between 1917 and 1919, but is already palpable in Soldier at a Game of Chess. The perspectival presentation is only fragmentary—almost non-Cubist in abstract guise—and lacks coherence, so that the resulting composition is throughout paradoxical. There are sufficient indications to suggest a soldier and the activity in which he's engaged; his military cap (and an echo of it in red), a hand (however transparent it may be), a face (with a cigarette in its mouth), the alternating colored squares of a chessboard, a rook, a pawn and other chess pieces. But the figure and his setting simultaneously fuse as an arrangement of planes that cancel those indications of depth any greater than a relief. And the disorientations are compounded by Metzinger's placing of green and orange in the soldiers upward-turned face, while the red of his arms espouse the echo-like profile of the face and cap in the background plane directed downward toward the game, for it becomes almost inevitable to see the soldier's alter ego; an effect that both pulls the man into the background of the composition and pushes him forward towards the viewer, again, canceling out indications of depth.

Here, Metzinger uses a checkerboard and wooden table to establish a clearly demarcated fore-plane that is non-fixed in relation to which its 'hovering' chess pieces are situated. This profound battle between planimetric and perspectival dimensions as here in Soldier at a Game of Chess has precedence in Metzinger's Cubism of 1912–13, but the absence of decorative elements, the clarity and sense of order, and degree of game-playing with conflicting codes for the personification of space that he refined during the war places the artist at the forefront of the nascent form of art dubbed Crystal Cubism by the critic Maurice Raynal.

== Exhibitions and reproductions ==
=== JAMA ===
JAMA, The Journal of the American Medical Association, 26 May 1993, cover, Jean Metzinger, Soldier at a Game of Chess

On 26 May 1993 Soldier at a Game of Chess was reproduced on the cover of JAMA, The Journal of the American Medical Association, a peer-reviewed medical journal published by the American Medical Association covering all aspects of the biomedical sciences.

From 1964 to 2013 JAMA published full color images of artwork on its cover, accompanied by essays inside the journal. "JAMA's former editor, George Lundberg, wrote that this was part of an initiative to inform readers about nonclinical aspects of medicine and public health", and to emphasize the link between the humanities and medical science.

Another work by Metzinger titled The Lamp (1917) was reproduced on the cover of JAMA on 27 September 2006 (Vol. 296 Issue 12).

In 2011 Soldier at a Game of Chess was featured on the cover of The Art of JAMA: Covers and Essays from The Journal of the American Medical Association, Volume 3, with the 1993 essay by Southgate reproduced in the edition.

=== Musée de Lodève ===
From 22 June to 3 November 2013 the Musée Fleury, called Musée de Lodève (Hérault), explored the evolution of Cubism through an exhibition entitled Gleizes – Metzinger, du cubisme et après: a continuation of an exhibition in celebration of the 100th anniversary of the publication of Du "Cubisme" by Jean Metzinger and Albert Gleizes, held at the Musée de La Poste in Paris. Prior to the exhibition, the Musée de Lodève successfully launched a fund raising campaign to help finance the sending of Metzinger's Soldat jouant aux échecs (Soldier at a Game of Chess) from the Smart Museum of Art in Chicago to Lodève.

=== Imaging/Imagining ===
X-ray composite overlay based on Jean Metzinger's Soldier at a Game of Chess

Jean Metzinger, Soldat jouant aux échecs (Soldier at a Game of Chess), Smart Museum of Art

For the occasion of an exhibition titled Imaging/Imagining the Human Body in Anatomical Representation, March 25 – June 20, 2014 at the Smart Museum of Art, The University of Chicago, Soldier at a Game of Chess was exhibited alongside an X-ray composite based on Metzinger's painting. The aim of the exhibition was to reveal the interdependence between representations of human anatomy through biomedicine's imaging technology and imaginings in the creative art's. The composite was produced by Adam Schwertner (fourth year medical student at the Pritzker School of Medicine, The University of Chicago), Stephen Thomas, MD (Assistant Professor of Radiology), and Brian Callender, MD (Assistant Professor of Medicine). "Digitally assembled radiographic scans" provided by the Department of Radiology at the University of Chicago Medical Center were superimposed on the painting.

Organized by physicians, this exhibition gathered images of the body from a range of historical periods and considered "the extent to which they conform to established representational conventions or seem instead to reflect the artist's own observations or expressive goals".

"Other themes considered were the enduring role of figure drawing in academic art study; the relation between artistic and scientific abstraction; the depiction of bodily suffering in wartime; and what art and medicine have to offer each other in the pursuit of accuracy, humanity, and empathy, when it comes to representing the body".

One year before Metzinger painted Soldier at a Game of Chess, the German physicist Max von Laue won the Nobel Prize in Physics in 1914 for his discovery of the diffraction of X-rays by crystals. Of interest to the Cubists, in addition to new scientific discoveries such as Röntgen's X-rays and Laue's X-ray diffraction, were Hertzian electromagnetic radiation and radio waves propagating through space, revealing the unseen; that which is beyond the grasp of sensory perception.

Imaging/Imagining was curated by Brian Callender, MD, and Mindy Schwartz, MD, professor of medicine at the University of Chicago's Pritzker School of Medicine. Produced with the cooperation of the University of Chicago Arts|Science Initiative, it was presented by the Special Collections Research Center, Smart Museum of Art.

=== Centre Pompidou, Kunstmuseum Basel ===
Le cubisme, 17 October 2018 to 25 February 2019, Centre Pompidou, the first large-scale exhibition devoted to Cubism in France since 1973, with over 300 works on display. The 1973 exhibition, Les Cubistes, included over 180 works and was held at the Musée d'Art Moderne de la Ville de Paris and Galerie des Beaux-Arts, Bordeaux. The motivation for the Pompidou exhibition resides in broadening the scope of Cubism, usually focused on Georges Braque and Pablo Picasso, to include the major contributions of the Salon Cubists, the Section d'Or, and others who participated in the over-all movement. The exhibition is held at Kunstmuseum Basel, from 31 March to 5 August 2019.

== See also ==
- Chess in the arts
- List of works by Jean Metzinger
