= Lady at her Dressing Table =

Painting by Jean Metzinger

- Femme au miroir (French)
- Artist: Jean Metzinger
- Year: 1916
- Medium: Oil on canvas
- Dimensions: 92.4 cm × 65.1 cm (36.37 in × 25.62 in)
- Location: Private collection

Lady with a her Dressing Table (French: Femme au miroir) is a painting by the French artist Jean Metzinger. This distilled synthetic form of Cubism exemplifies Metzinger's continued interest, in 1916, towards less surface activity, with a strong emphasis on larger, flatter, overlapping abstract planes. The manifest primacy of the underlying geometric configuration, rooted in the abstract, controls nearly every element of the composition. The role of color remains primordial, but is now restrained within sharp delineated boundaries in comparison with several earlier works. The work of Juan Gris from the summer of 1916 to late 1918 bears much in common with that of Metzinger's late 1915 – early 1916 paintings.

Painted during the spring of 1916, Femme au miroir formed part of the collection of Léonce Rosenberg, and was probably exhibited at Galerie de L'Effort Moderne in Paris. In 1918, the painting was shipped to New York City for the occasion of the Léonce Rosenberg collection auction. For the same occasion, Femme au miroir was reproduced in The Sun, New York, Sunday 28 April 1918. The painting was purchased in New York City (at the auction or afterwards) by the American art collector John Quinn, and formed part of his collection until 1927.

The work was subsequently featured at The University of Iowa Museum of Art in the Jean Metzinger in Retrospect exhibition, 1985, and reproduced as a full page color plate in the catalogue.

== Description ==
Femme au miroir, signed "JMetzinger" and dated Avril 1916 on the reverse, is an oil painting on canvas with dimensions 92.4 x 65.1 cm (51 1/16 x 38 1/16 in.). The vertical composition is painted in a geometrically Cubist style, representing a woman holding a mirror in her left hand, standing in front of a chair and dressing table upon which rests a perfume atomizer. The setting appears to be an interior. An angled window appears to the left with an awning above, part of a tree and blue sky beyond.

Jean Metzinger, c.1915, L'infirmière (The Nurse), published in l'Elan, Number 9, 12 February 1916

Jean Metzinger, 1916, Femme au miroir (Lady at her Dressing Table), detail

The woman appears simultaneously clothed and unclothed in an interplay of transparencies, visual, tactile, and motor spaces, evoking a series of mind-associations between past present and future not atypical of Metzinger's earlier works. Her left breast is seen both from the front and from the side simultaneously. Her pose is elegant. Her face is eminently stylized, her neck is tubiform, her hair almost realistic in appearance as if combed onto the canvas; her shoulders, decidedly cubic from which emanate long slender arms superimposed with geometric elements that compose the background. Depth of field is practically non-present. Blues, whites and reds dominate the composition. Greens and ochers serve to delineate elements in the foreground (arms, leg, table).

Metzinger's works from 1915 and 1916 show a more restrained use of rectilinear grids, heavy surface texture and bold decorative patterning. The manifest primacy of the geometric armature strikingly controls nearly every element of the composition, ensuring the synthetic unity of the whole.

"Direct reference to observed reality" is still present, but now the emphasis is placed on the self-sufficiency of the painting as an object unto itself. "Orderly qualities" and the "autonomous purity" of the composition are now a prime concern.

== Background ==
The Cubist considerations manifested prior to the outset of World War I—such as the fourth dimension, dynamism of modern life, the occult, and Henri Bergson's concept of duration—had now been vacated, replaced by a purely formal reference frame.

This clarity and sense of order spread to almost all on the artists under contract with Léonce Rosenberg—including Juan Gris, Jacques Lipchitz, Henri Laurens, Auguste Herbin, Joseph Csaky and Gino Severini—leading to the descriptive term 'Crystal Cubism', coined by the critic Maurice Raynal.

Femme au miroir, as other works by Metzinger of the same period, relate to those of his colleague and friend Juan Gris, whose Portrait of Josette Gris was painted just six months after Metzinger's canvas, and with Gris' Seated Woman of 1917.

Jean Metzinger, April 1916, Femme au miroir (Lady at her Dressing Table), private collection

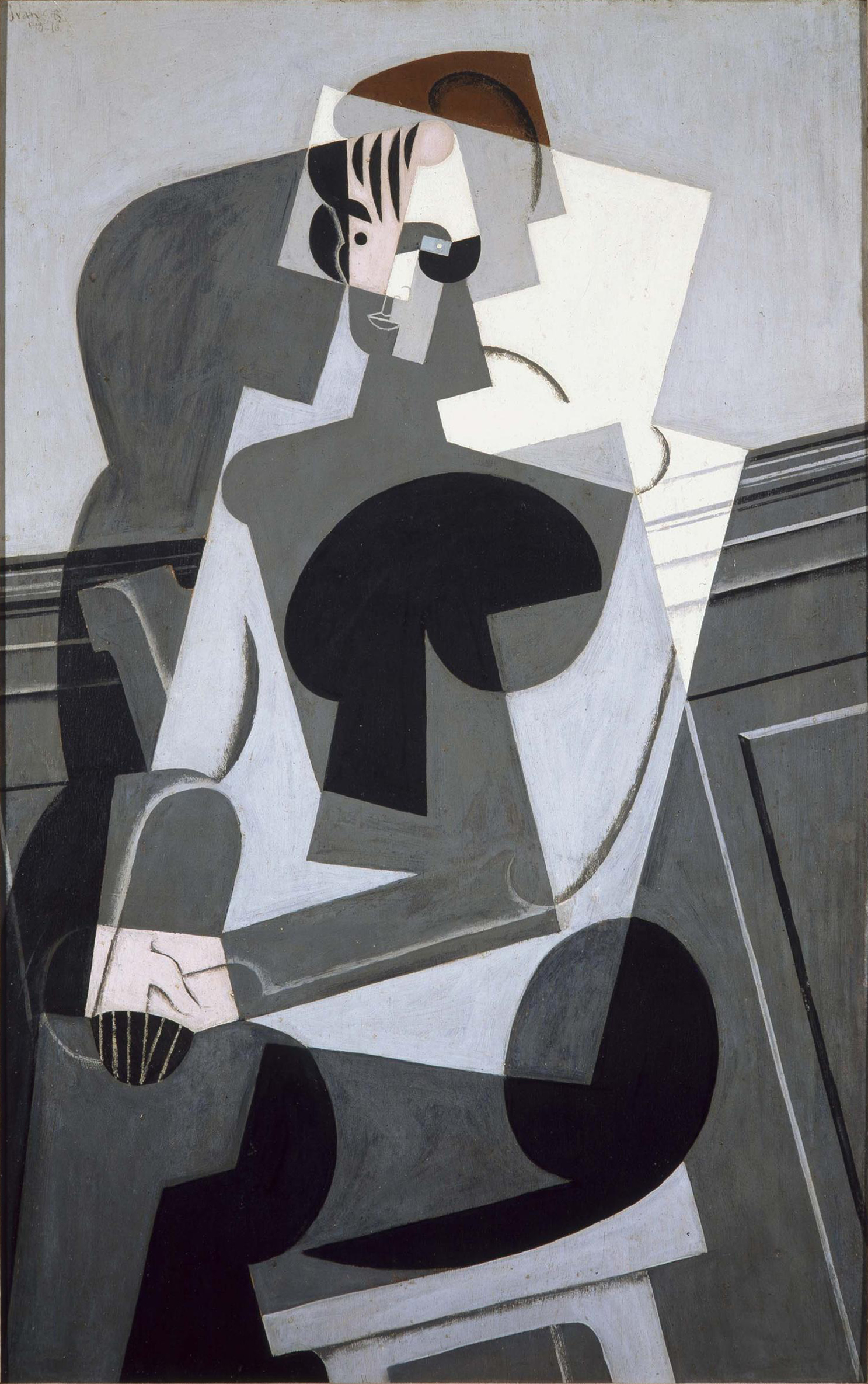
Juan Gris, October 1916, Portrait of Josette Gris, 116 x 73 cm, Museo Reina Sofia

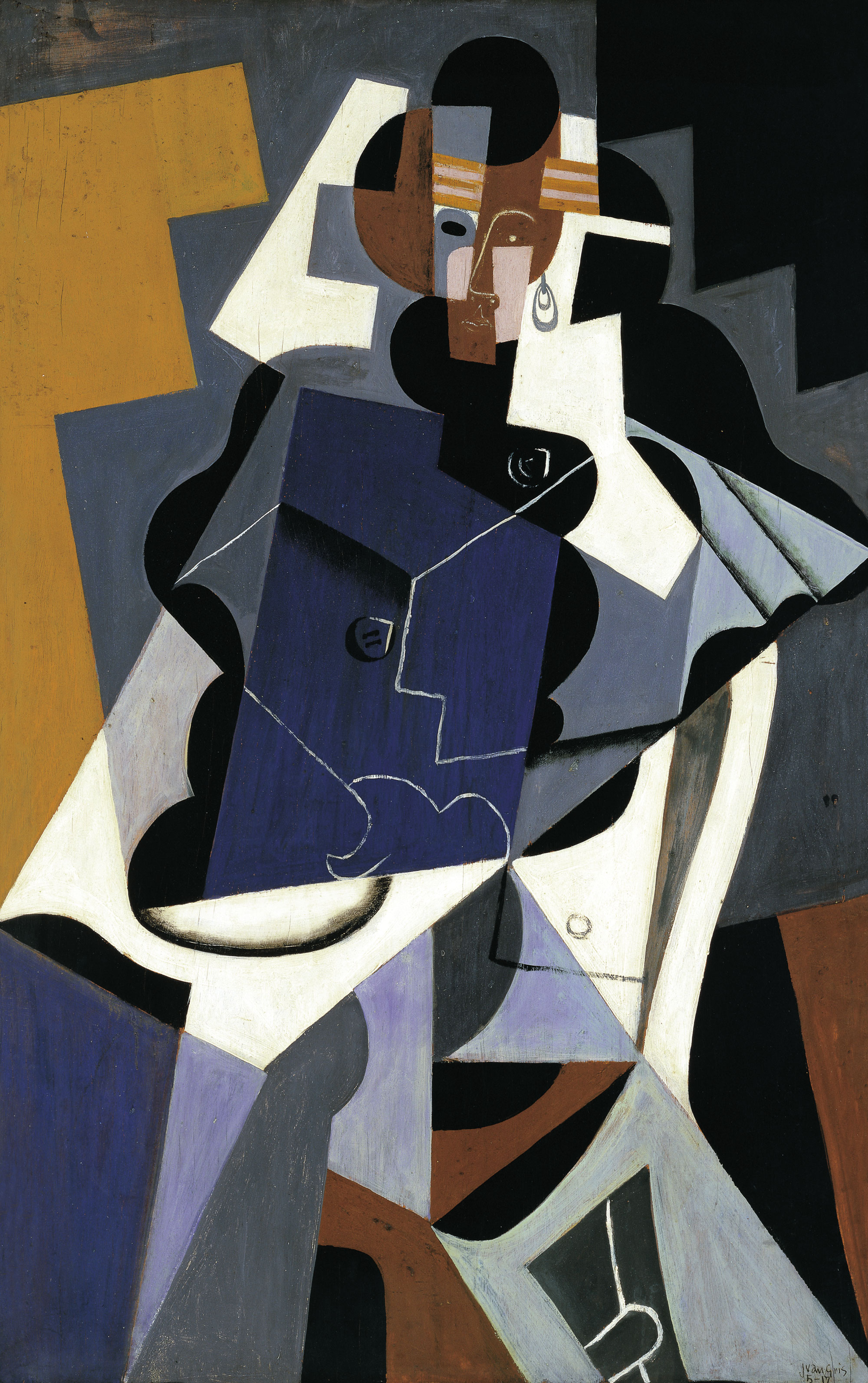
Juan Gris, 1917, Seated Woman (Mujer sentada), 116 × 73 cm, Thyssen-Bornemisza Museum

The works of Gris and Metzinger painted during the war employ transparencies that blur the distinction between the background and the figure. Rather than gradients of tone or color, these works are painted with flat, uniform sections of tone and color. Albeit, in Femme au miroir Metzinger uses a textured surface in the lighter blue areas. Some minimal brushstrokes remain visible throughout these paintings. Each painting represents objects or elements of the real world—such as perfume bottles, moulding of the walls, an ear ring—and human figures. Most outstanding of all, however, is the angular juxtaposition of the surface planes, which the works hold in common.

During 1916, Sunday discussions at the studio of Jacques Lipchitz included Metzinger, Gris, Pablo Picasso, Diego Rivera, Henri Matisse, Amedeo Modigliani, Pierre Reverdy, André Salmon, Max Jacob, and Blaise Cendrars. Metzinger and Gris were thus in close contact.

In a letter written in Paris to Albert Gleizes in Barcelona during the war, dated 4 July 1916, Metzinger writes:

After two years of study I have succeeded in establishing the basis of this new perspective I have talked about so much. It is not the materialist perspective of Gris, nor the romantic perspective of Picasso. It is rather a metaphysical perspective—I take full responsibility for the word. You can't begin to imagine what I've found out since the beginning of the war, working outside painting but for painting. The geometry of the fourth space has no more secret for me. Previously I had only intuitions, now I have certainty. I have made a whole series of theorems on the laws of displacement [déplacement], of reversal [retournement] etc. I have read Schoute, Rieman (sic), Argand, Schlegel etc.

The actual result? A new harmony. Don't take this word harmony in its ordinary [banal] everyday sense, take it in its original [primitif] sense. Everything is number. The mind [esprit] hates what cannot be measured: it must be reduced and made comprehensible.

That is the secret. There in nothing more to it [pas de reste à l'opération]. Painting, sculpture, music, architecture, lasting art is never anything more than a mathematical expression of the relations that exist between the internal and the external, the self [le moi] and the world. (Metzinger, 4 July 1916)

The 'new perspective' according to Daniel Robbins, "was a mathematical relationship between the ideas in his mind and the exterior world". The 'fourth space' for Metzinger was the space of the mind.

In a second letter to Gleizes, dated 26 July 1916, Metzinger writes:

Jean Metzinger, c.1914, Femme devant le miroir, pencil on paper, 60.3 x 47.6 cm (23 3/4 x 18 3/4 in.), private collection

Jean Metzinger, April 1916, Femme au miroir (Lady at her Dressing Table)

If painting was an end in itself it would enter into the category of the minor arts which appeal only to physical pleasure... No. Painting is a language—and it has its syntax and its laws. To shake up that framework a bit to give more strength or life to what you want to say, that isn't just a right, it's a duty; but you must never lose sight of the End. The End, however, isn't the subject, nor the object, nor even the picture—the End, it is the idea. (Metzinger, 26 July 1916)

Continuing, Metzinger mentions the differences between himself and Juan Gris:

Someone from whom I feel ever more distant is Juan Gris. I admire him but I cannot understand why he wears himself out with decomposing objects. Myself, I am advancing towards synthetic unity and I don't analyze any more. I take from things what seems to me to have meaning and be most suitable to express my thought. I want to be direct, like Voltaire. No more metaphors. Ah those stuffed tomatoes of all the St-Pol-Roux of painting.

Some of the ideas expressed in these letters to Gleizes were reproduced and quoted in an article written by Paul Dermée, published in the magazine SIC, 1919, but the existence of letters themselves remained unknown until the mid-1980s.

From 1916, Lipchitz, Gris and Metzinger had been in close contact with one another. The three had just signed contracts with the dealer, art collector and gallery owner Léonce Rosenberg. It is the work executed during the war of these three artists that can be analyzed as a process of distillation in a shift towards order and purity. This process would continue through 1918 when the three spent part of the summer together in Beaulieu-Prés-Loches to escape the bombardment of Paris.

At the opening of the Musée National d"art Moderne in Paris, 9 June 1947, Léonce Rosenberg related his impressions to Hélène Bauret:

In the painting "La Tricoteuse", hanging next to works by Gris, Metzinger reveals himself more of a painter, more natural, more flexible [plus souple] than Gris. Often, Gris would tell me: "Ah! If I could brush [brosser] like the French!"

Jean Metzinger, 1911, Le Goûter (Tea Time) (left), and Juan Gris, 1912, Hommage à Pablo Picasso (right)

Gris was indeed capable of producing works closely attuned to those of Metzinger. His late arrival on the Cubist scene (1912) saw him influenced by the leaders of the movement: Picasso, of the 'Gallery Cubists' and Metzinger of the 'Salon Cubists'. His entry at the 1912 Salon des Indépendants, Hommage à Pablo Picasso, was also an homage to Metzinger's Le goûter (Tea Time). Le goûter persuaded Gris of the importance of mathematics (numbers) in painting.

As art historian Peter Brooke points out, Gris started painting persistently in 1911 and first exhibited at the 1912 Salon des Indépendants. "He appears with two styles", writes Brooke, "In one of them a grid structure appears that is clearly reminiscent of the Goûter and of Metzinger's later work in 1912. In the other, the grid is still present but the lines are not stated and their continuity is broken".

Art historian Christopher Green writes that the "deformations of lines" allowed by mobile perspective in the head of Metzinger's Tea-time and Gleizes's Jacques Nayral "have seemed tentative to historians of Cubism. In 1911, as the key area of likeness and unlikeness, they more than anything released the laughter." Green continues, "This was the wider context of Gris's decision at the Indépendants of 1912 to make his debut with a Homage to Pablo Picasso, which was a portrait, and to do so with a portrait that responded to Picasso's portraits of 1910 through the intermediary of Metzinger's Tea-time.

Jean Metzinger, c.1913, Le Fumeur (Man with Pipe), oil on canvas, 129.7 x 96.68 cm, Carnegie Museum of Art

Jean Metzinger, April 1916, Femme au miroir (Lady at her Dressing Table)

While Metzinger's process of distillation is already noticeable during the latter half of 1915, and conspicuously extending into early 1916, this shift is signaled in the works of Gris and Lipchitz from the latter half of 1916, and particularly between 1917 and 1918.

Kahnweiler dated the shift in style of Juan Gris to the summer and autumn of 1916, following the pointilliste paintings of early 1916. This timescale corresponds with the period after which Gris signed a contract with Léonce Rosenberg, following a rally of support by Henri Laurens, Lipchitz and Metzinger.

Metzinger's radical geometrization of form as an underlying architectural basis for his compositions is already visible in his work circa 1912–13, in paintings such as Au Vélodrome (1912) and Le Fumeur (1913). Where before, the perception of depth had been greatly reduced, now, the depth of field was no greater than a bas-relief.

Jean Metzinger, 1914–15, Soldat jouant aux échecs (Soldier at a Game of Chess, Le Soldat à la partie d'échecs), oil on canvas, 81.3 x 61 cm, Smart Museum of Art, University of Chicago

Metzinger's evolution toward synthesis has its origins in the configuration of flat squares, trapezoidal and rectangular planes that overlap and interweave, a "new perspective" in accord with the "laws of displacement". In the case of Le Fumeur Metzinger filled in these simple shapes with gradations of color, wallpaper-like patterns and rhythmic curves. So too in Au Vélodrome. But the underlying armature upon which all is built is palpable. Vacating these non-essential features would lead Metzinger on a path towards Femme au miroir, and a host of other works created before and after the artist's demobilization as a medical orderly during the war, such as L'infirmière (The Nurse, location unknown); Soldier at a Game of Chess (1914–15, Smart Museum of Art); Landscape with Open Window (1915, Musée des Beaux-Arts de Nantes); Femme à la dentelle (1916, Musée d'Art Moderne de la Ville de Paris); Summer (1916, Statens Museum for Kunst); Le goûter (1917, Galerie Malingue, Paris); Tête de femme (1916–17, private collection); and two works very closely related to Femme au miroir: Femme devant le miroir (c. 1914, private collection) and Femme au miroir (1916–17, Donn Shapiro collection).

Images were now created solely out of the imagination of the artist (or virtually so), independent of any visual starting point. Observed reality and all that is referred to in life was no longer needed as foundation for artistic production. The synthetic manipulation of abstract geometric shapes, or "mathematical expression of the relations that exist between the le moi and the world", to use the words of Metzinger, was the ideal metaphysical starting point. Only afterwards would those structures be made to denote objects of choice.

== Exhibitions and provenance ==
Jean Metzinger, Femme au miroir (Lady at her Dressing Table), Views and Reviews in the World of Art, The Sun, New York, Sunday 28 April 1918. Article published for the occasion of the Léonce Rosenberg collection auction in New York City

In 1918 Femme au miroir was included in the exhibition and sale in New York of the Léonce Rosenberg collection. In the catalogue the painting (No. 97) is titled Lady at her Dressing Table, signed Metzinger and dated April 1916 on the back. The dimensions given are 36 1/2 x 25 1/2 inches. For the occasion of the Léonce Rosenberg sale, Lady at her Dressing Table was reproduced in an article published in The Sun (New York, N.Y.).

The painting was likely purchased by the American collector John Quinn at the Rosenberg sale or shortly afterwards. Two years earlier, on 10 February 1916, John Quinn had acquired Metzinger's Au Vélodrome (At the Cycle-Race Track) (no. 266) and the Racing Cyclist (no. 124). Both paintings had been on view in the Carroll Galleries exhibition: Third Exhibition of Contemporary French Art—with works by Pach, Gleizes, Picasso, de La Fresnaye, Van Gogh, Gauguin, Derain, Duchamp, Duchamp-Villon and Villon. The acquisition was preceded by a lively correspondence between Quinn, the gallery manager Harriet Bryant, and the artist's brother Maurice Metzinger.

In 1927 an exhibition and sale of Quinn's art collection took place in New York City. The event included works by Jean Metzinger, Albert Gleizes, Henri Matisse, André Derain, Maurice de Vlaminck, Robert Delaunay, Jacques Villon, Gino Severini, and Raymond Duchamp-Villon; in addition to American artists Arthur B. Davies, Walt Kuhn, Marsden Hartley, Stanton Macdonald-Wright, and Max Weber. The sale was conducted by Otto Bernet and Hiram H. Parke at the American Art Galleries. A catalogue was published for the occasion by the American Art Association. Au Vélodrome (n. 266 of the catalogue) was purchased at the sale for $70 by American art dealer and publisher J. B. Neumann. Peggy Guggenheim purchased the painting from Neumann in 1945 and forms part of the permanent collection of her museum in Venice; Peggy Guggenheim Collection.

Femme au miroir was included in the Quinn exhibition and sale, titled Femme à sa toilette, no. 358. The catalogue description reads:

Decorative cubistic portrayal of a lady at her dressing table, holding a mirror in her left hand. A curious relativity of form in vigorous colors. Signed at back, Metzinger, and dated 1916.

Jean Metzinger, invitation card for the exhibition at Léonce Rosenberg's Galerie de L'Effort Moderne, January 1919

The work was purchased for the sum of 55 U.S. dollars. John Quinn had also acquired Brooklyn Bridge and several other works by Albert Gleizes that had been on view at the Montross Gallery, New York, 1916—an exhibition that included works by Jean Crotti, Marcel Duchamp and Jean Metzinger—either during the exhibition or subsequently. Brooklyn Bridge (n. 263 of the catalogue) was purchased at the sale for $60. Other works by Metzinger at the sale included two works titled Paysage (no. 117 and 509A), Tête de Jeune Fille (no. 247), Tête de Femme (no. 500A).

The sculptures of Lipchitz, Laurens and Csaky, and the paintings of Gris, Severini and Gleizes represented Cubism in its most distilled form between 1916 and 1920. However, by the time of his exhibition at the Galerie de L'Effort Moderne at the outset of 1919—just as before the war—Metzinger was considered a leader of the movement. His paintings at this exhibition were perceived as highly significant. The fact that Metzinger's Lady at her Dressing Table was chosen from more than 100 artworks in the Rosenberg sale to be reproduced in The Sun (New York) suggests that Metzinger was perceived as a leader of the Cubist movement abroad as well. For the general public, the idea of Cubism was for many years associated more with Metzinger than with Braque or Picasso, who exhibited in a private gallery rather than in the salons; essentially removing themselves from the public.

== Mirrors in art ==
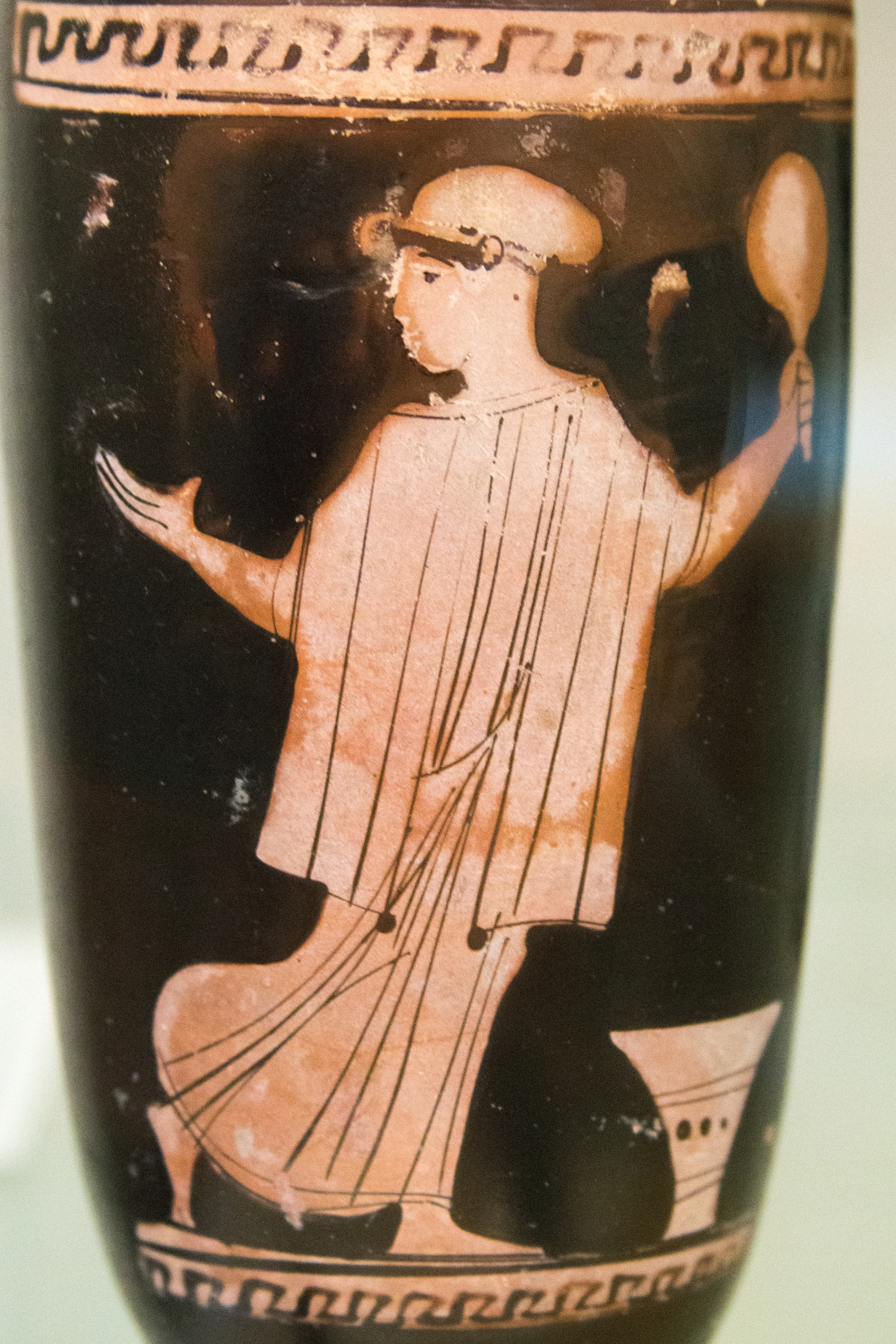
Red-figure lekythos. Woman holding a mirror. Athens 470–460 BC. NG Prague, on loan from the National Museum in Prague, H10 774

Titian's Venus with a Mirror, c. 1555

References to mirrors have been dated from 6200 to 4500 BCE. The earliest metal mirrors found in Mesopotamia are dated circa 4,000 BCE. Though archeologists discovered what are considered the first man-made mirrors in the burials of the Badari culture (5,000 – 4,500 BCE).

The theme of depicting mirrors in art dates back to at least the art of ancient Egypt (e.g., Queen Kawit at her toilet, a relief found in a sarcophagus at Deir el-Bahri temple complex) in passing through the classical period of ancient Greece.

The mirror is the central device in a wide variety of European paintings:

- Titian's Venus with a Mirror
- Jan van Eyck's Arnolfini Portrait
- Édouard Manet's A Bar at the Folies-Bergère
- Pablo Picasso's Girl before a Mirror (1932)
- Diego Velázquez's Las Meninas, wherein the viewer is both the watcher (of a self-portrait in progress) and the watched, and the many adaptations of that painting in various media
- Veronese's Venus with a Mirror

Mirrors have been used by artists to create works and hone their craft:

- Filippo Brunelleschi discovered linear perspective with the help of the mirror.
- Leonardo da Vinci called the mirror the "master of painters". He recommended, "When you wish to see whether your whole picture accords with what you have portrayed from nature take a mirror and reflect the actual object in it. Compare what is reflected with your painting and carefully consider whether both likenesses of the subject correspond, particularly in regard to the mirror."
- Many self-portraits are made possible through the use of mirrors:
  - Mirrors were used by Dürer, Frida Kahlo, Rembrandt, Van Gogh and others, to make self-portraits.
  - M. C. Escher used special shapes of mirrors in order to achieve a much more complete view of his surroundings than by direct observation in Hand with Reflecting Sphere (also known as Self-Portrait in Spherical Mirror).
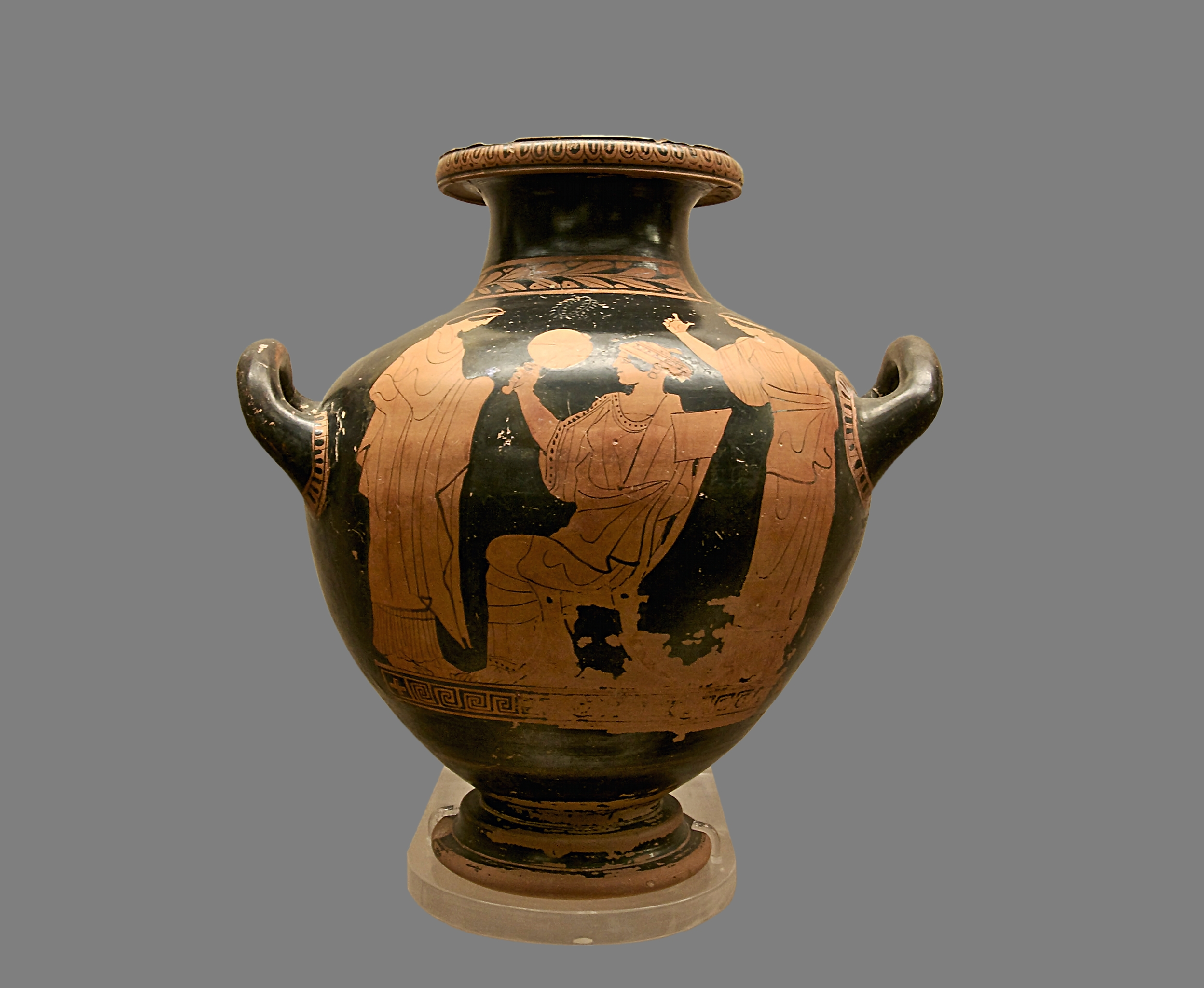
Hermonax, between 470 and 450 BC, Seated woman holding a mirror and talking with two women, Hydria, Archaeological Museum of Rhodes

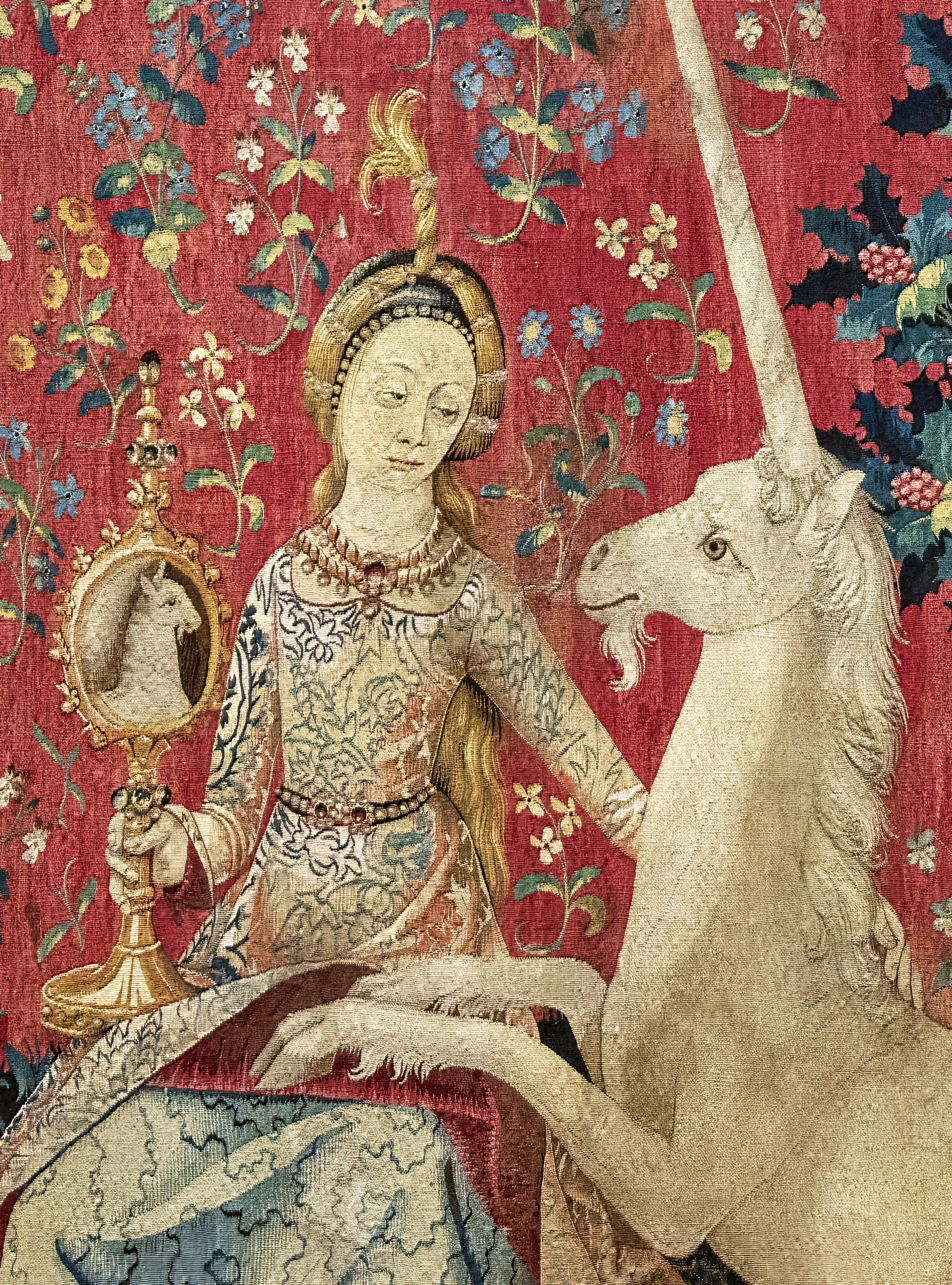
Unknown, early 15th century, La Dame à la licorne, Musée national du Moyen Âge

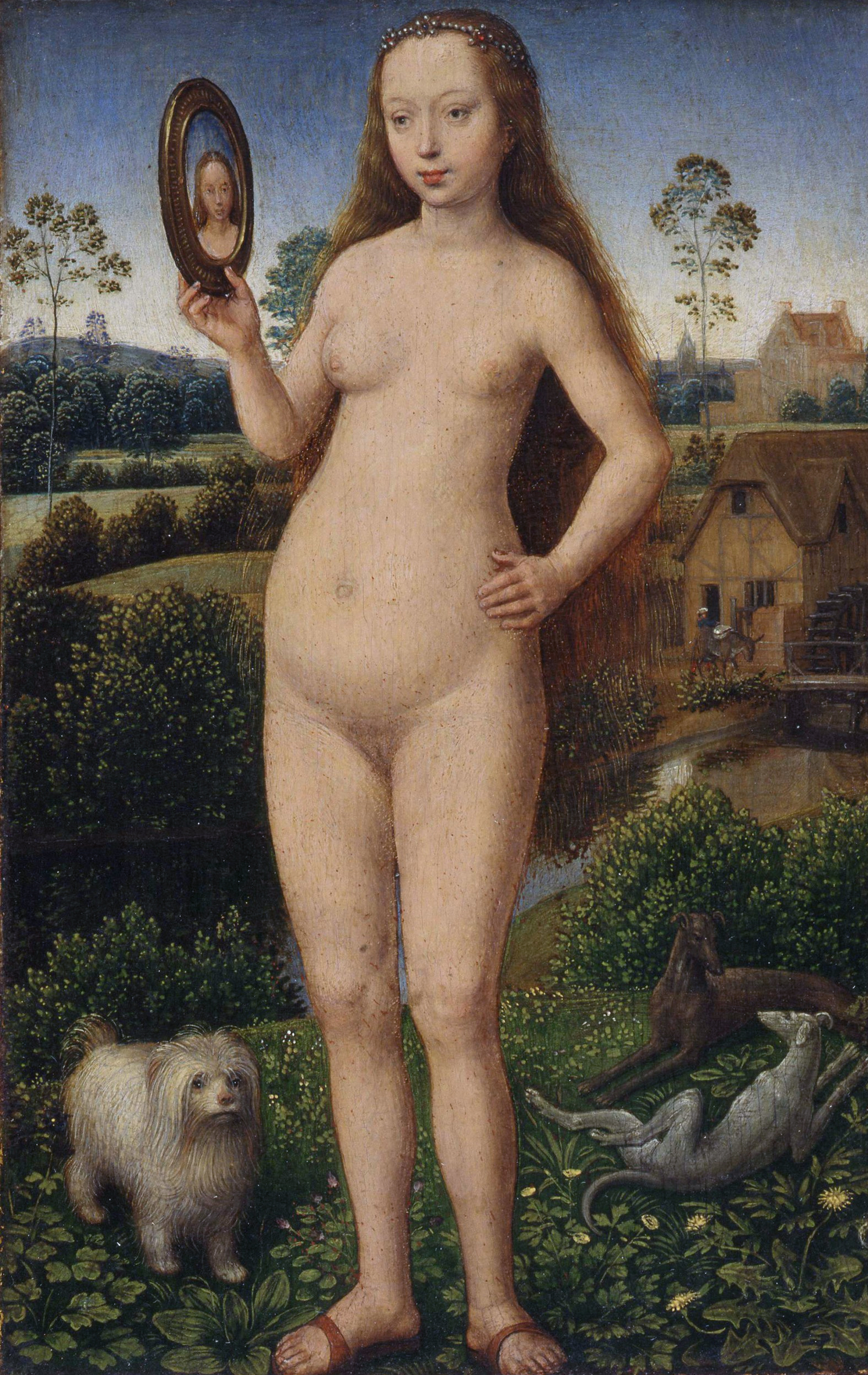
Hans Memling, c. 1485, Vanity, or Lust, Musée des Beaux-Arts de Strasbourg

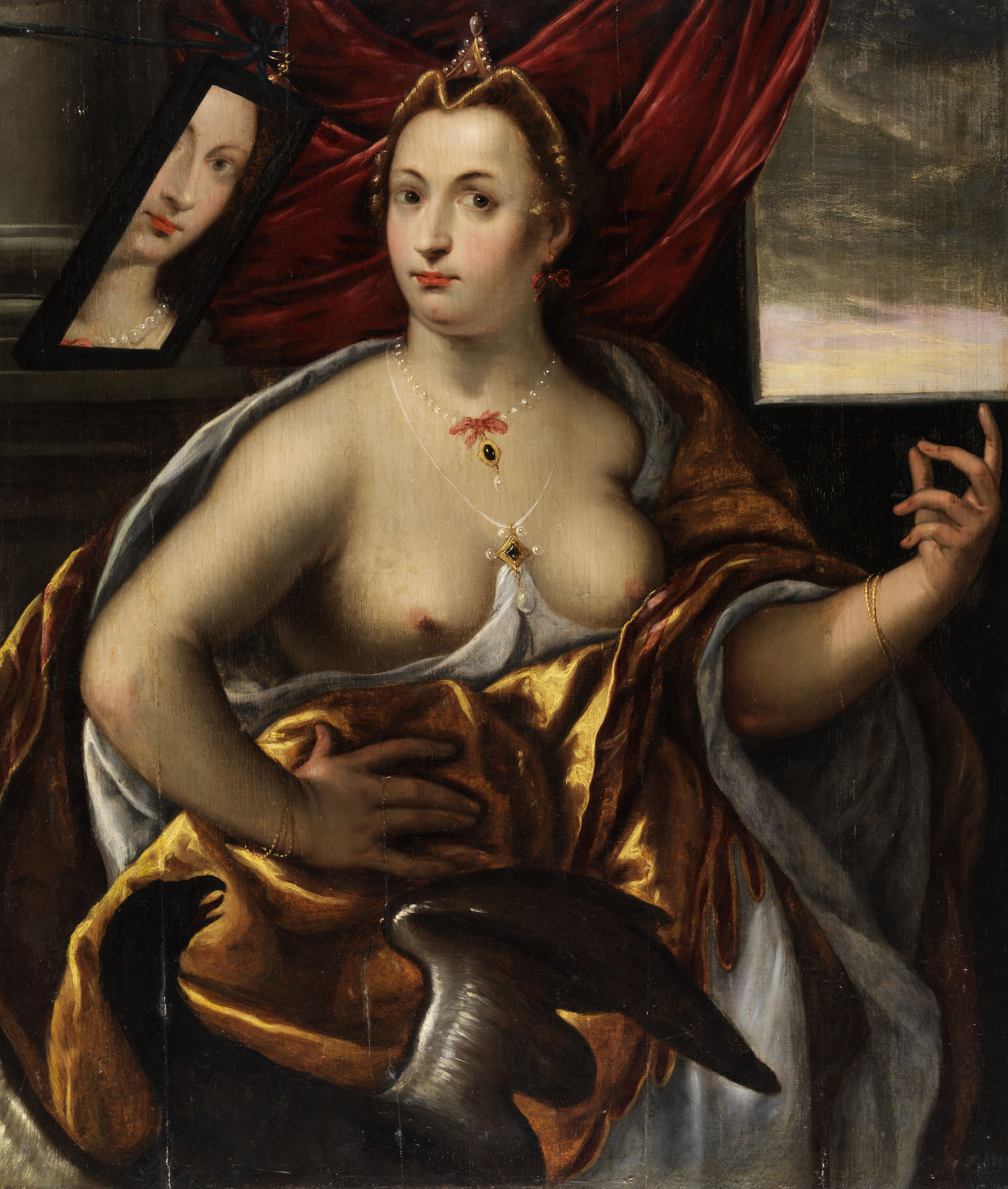
Frans Floris, 16th century, Allegorie des Gesichtes

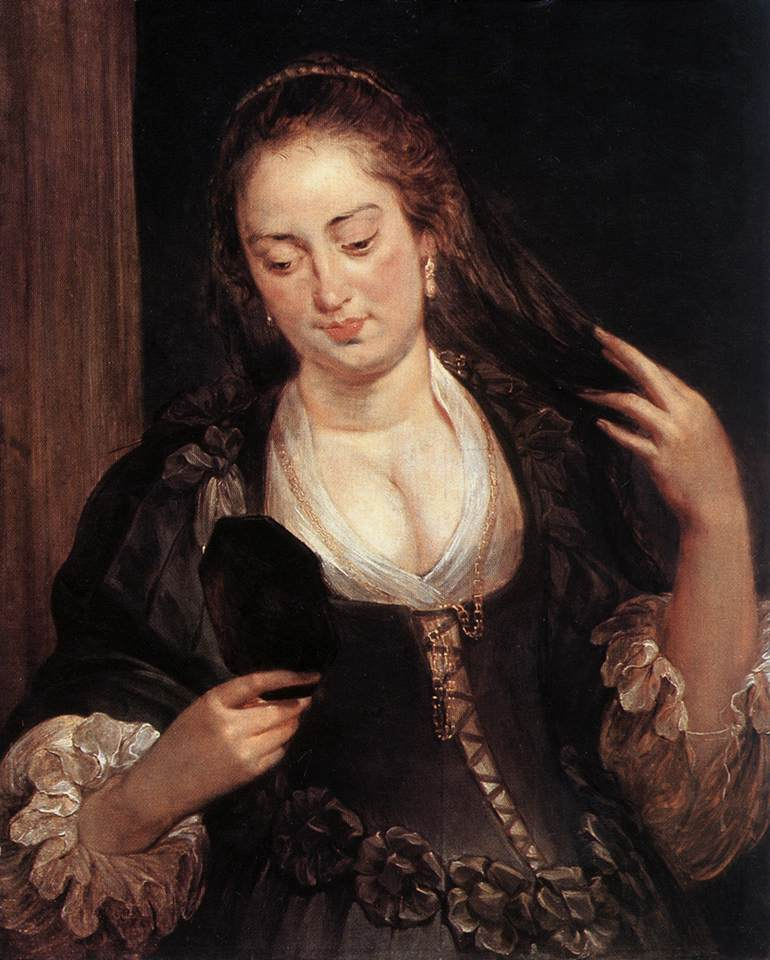
Peter Paul Rubens, c. 1640, Woman with a Mirror, Museumslandschaft Hessen Kassel

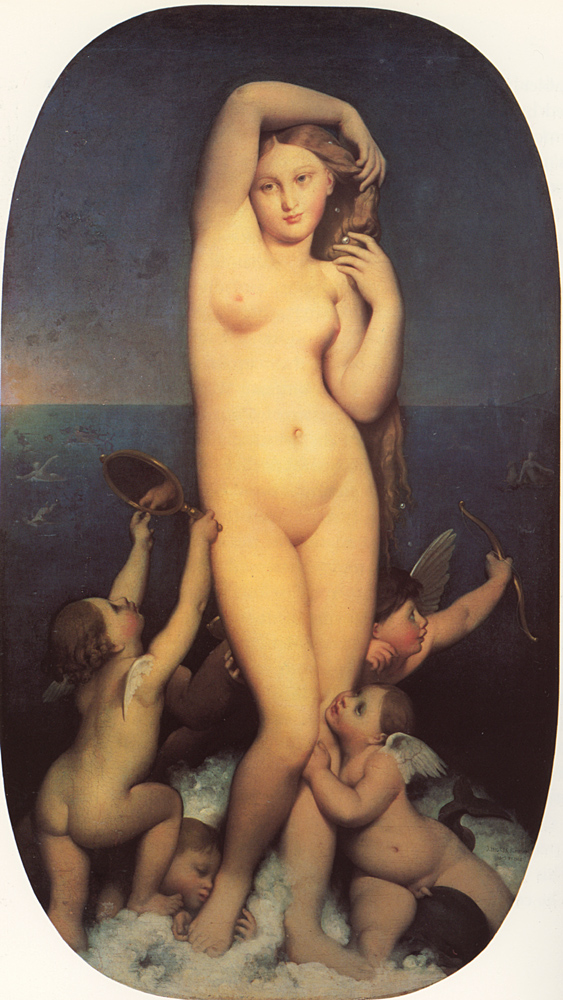
Jean-Auguste-Dominique Ingres, between 1808 and 1848, Venus Anadyomène, Musée Condé

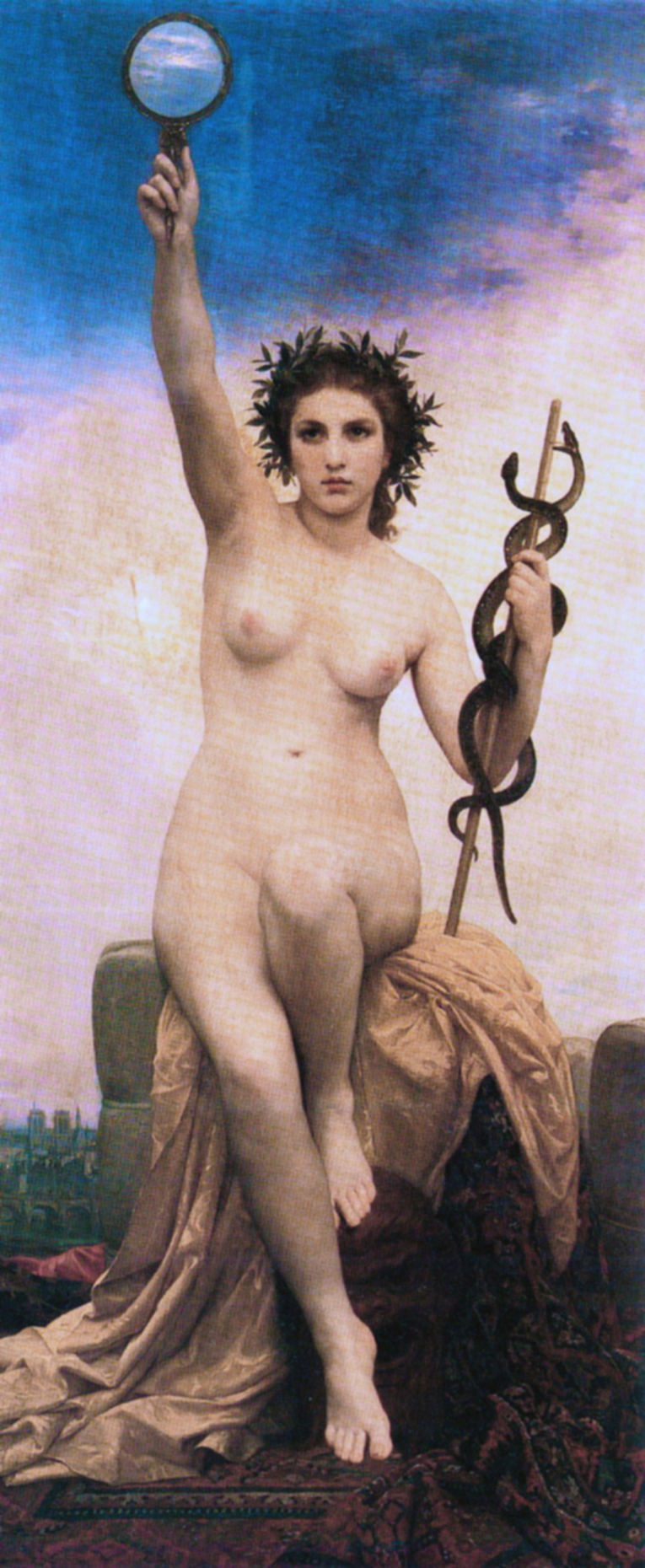
William-Adolphe Bouguereau, 1876, Integrity

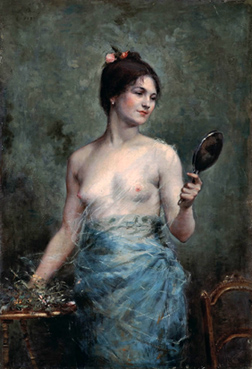
Eduardo Sívori, 1889, Woman and the Mirror, Juan B. Castagnino Fine Arts Museum

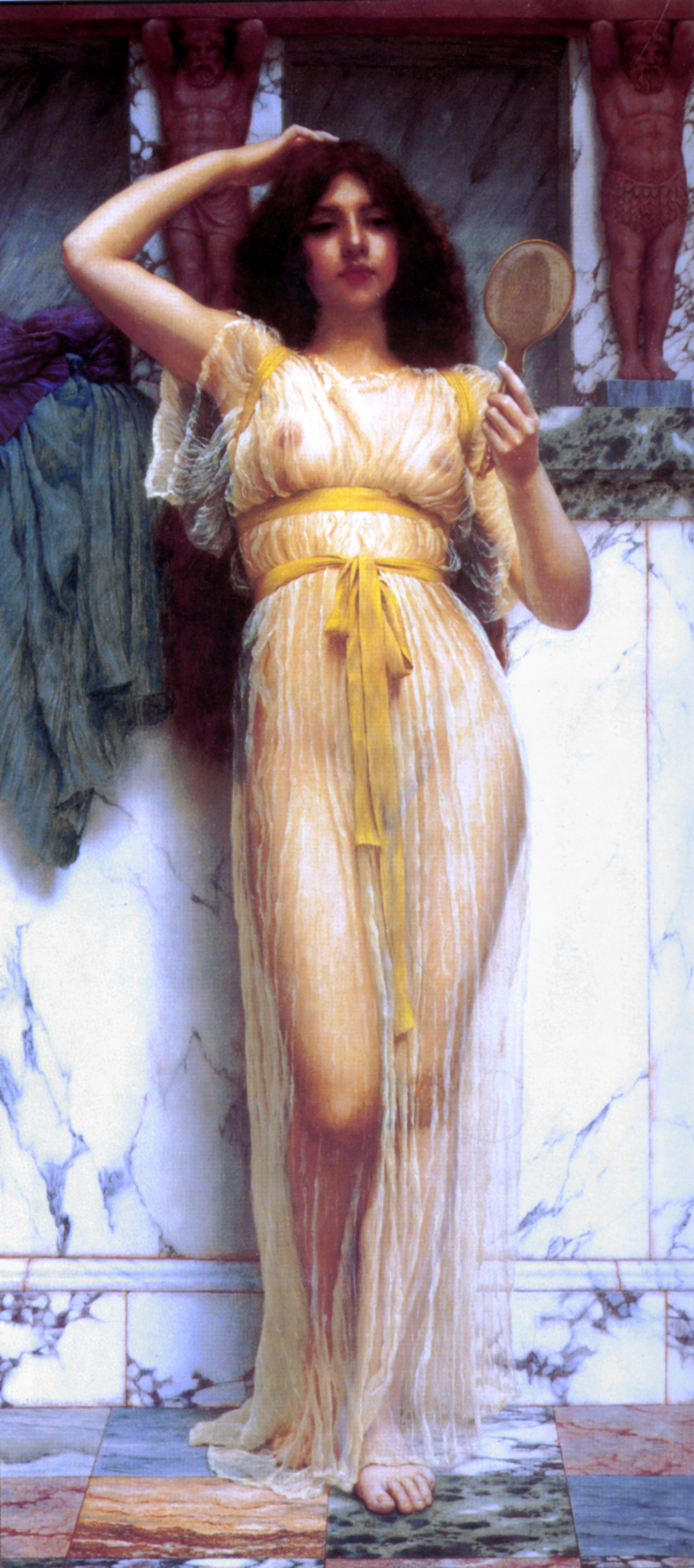
John William Godward, 1899, The Mirror, private collection

== See also ==
- List of works by Jean Metzinger
