= Maurice Raynal =

Art critic

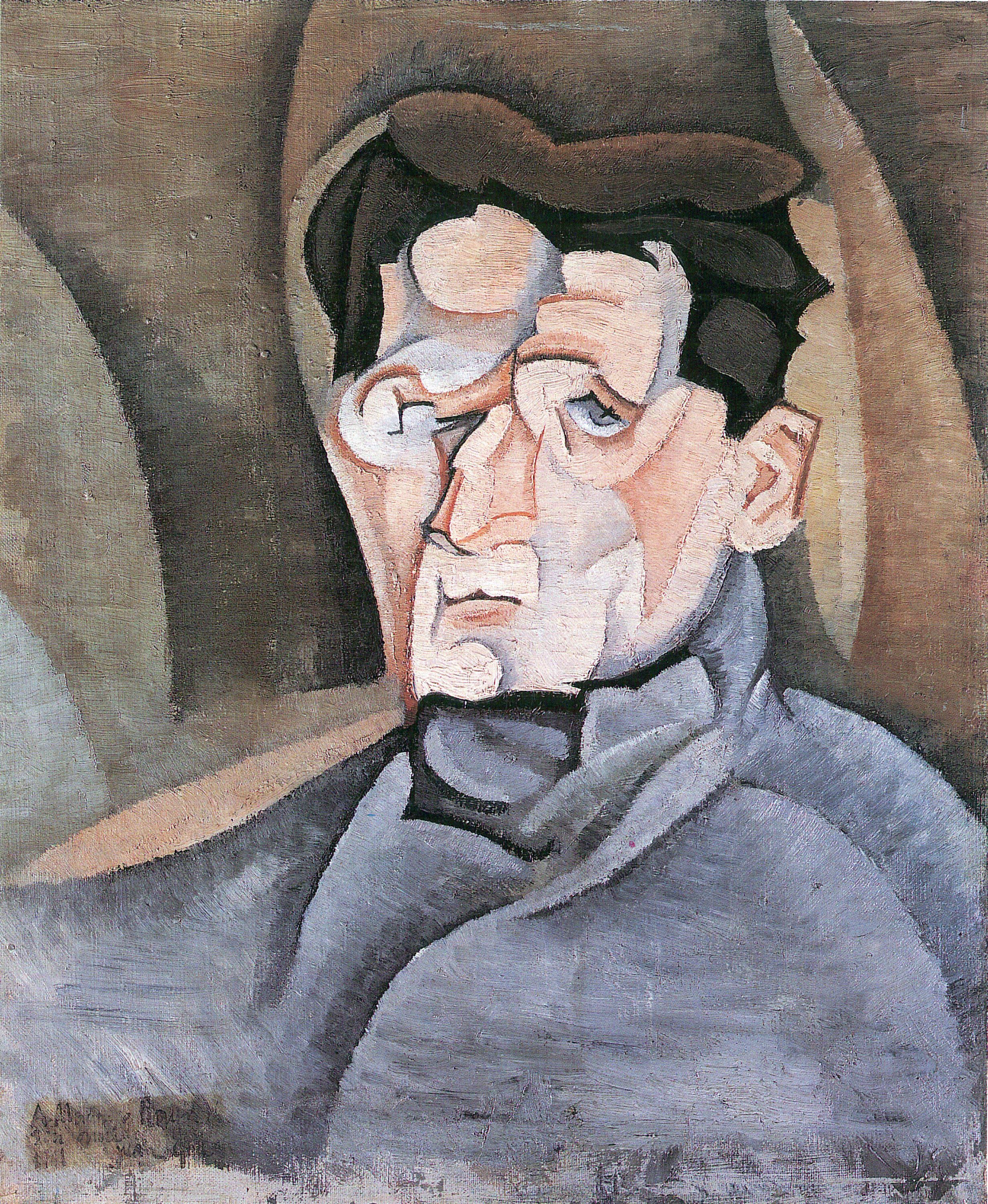
Portrait of Maurice Raynal (1911), by Juan Gris.

Maurice Raynal (3 February 1884, Paris – 18 September 1954, Suresnes) was a French art critic and an ardent propagandist of cubism.

Guillaume Apollinaire's poem "La Maison des morts" ("The House of the Dead"), from Alcools (1913), is dedicated to Raynal.

== Some publications ==
- Essai de Définition de la Peinture Cubiste, Bulletin de la Section d'Or, Paris, 9 October 1912
- Quelques Intentions du Cubisme, I'Effort Moderne, 1919
- Picasso, 1921
- Juan Gris et la métaphore plastique, Feuilles Libres, 1923
- Quelques Intentions du Cubisme, Bulletin de I'Effort Moderne, nos. 1, 2, 3, January-March, 1924
- Anthologie de la Peinture en France de 1906 a nos jours, Paris, Editions Montaigne, 1927
- Modern French Painters, New York, Brentano's, 1928
- Histoire de la peinture moderne de Baudelaire à Bonnard, Geneva, Skira, 1949
- Le dix-neuvième siècle: De Goya à Gauguin, 1951
- Modern Painting: Painting, Color, History, Geneva, Editions D'Art Albert Skira, 1953, 339 pp. [Translated to English by Stuart Gilbert]

== Bibliography ==
- David Raynal, Maurice Raynal – La Bande à Picasso, éd. Ouest-France, 2008, ISBN 978-2-7373-4612-5
- Georg Schmidt (Einl.): Geschichte der modernen Malerei. Matisse − Munch − Rouault. Fauvismus und Expressionismus. Text and Documentation by Maurice Raynal and others, Skira, 1950
