= Jeanne Lion =

French actress (1876–1956)

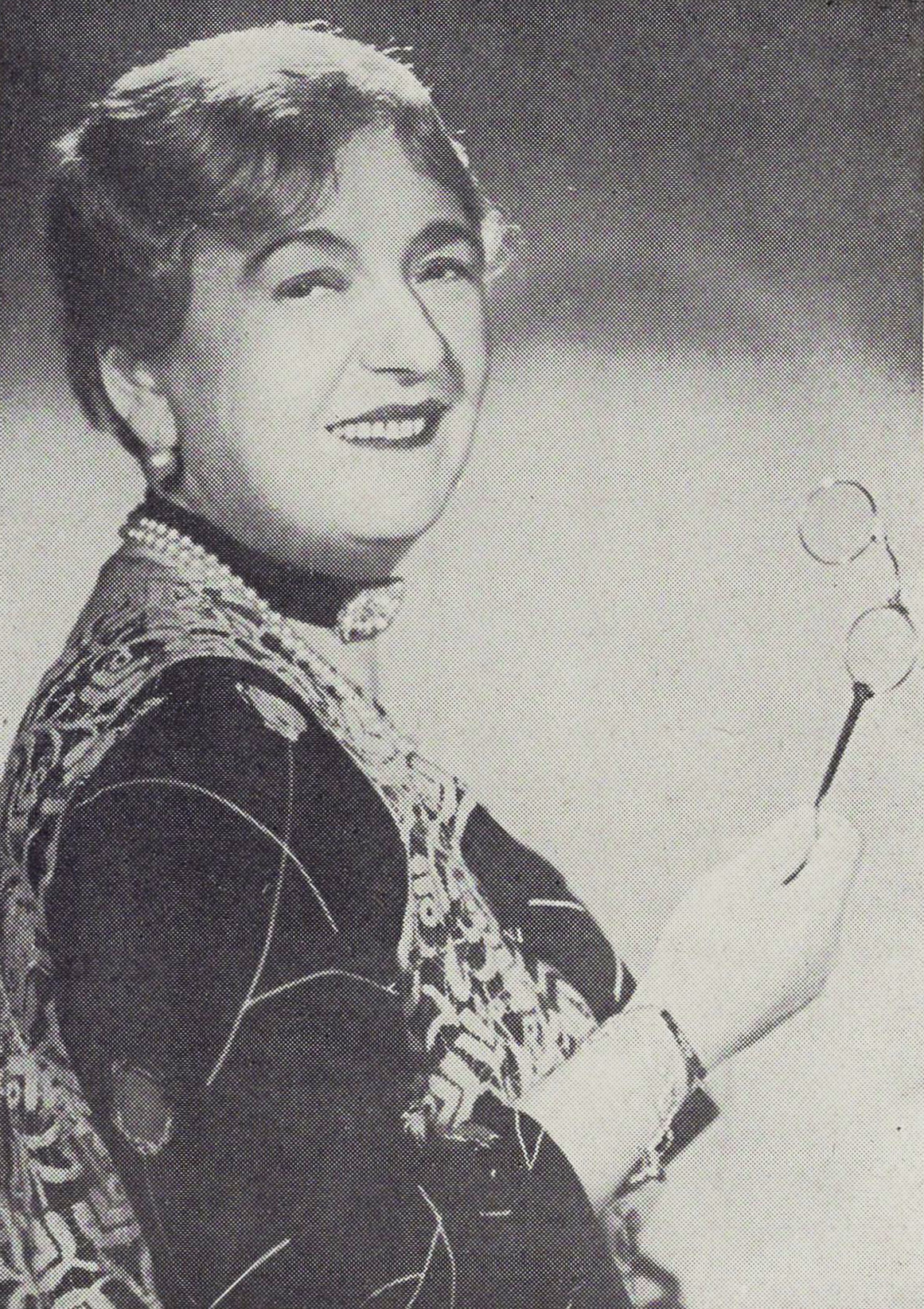
- Jeanne Lion in 1939
- Born: 17 August 1876; 9th arrondissement of Paris
- Died: 24 December 1956 (aged 80); 17th arrondissement of Paris
- Occupation: Actress

Jeanne Lion, or Jeanne Léonnec, (17 August 1876 – 24 December 1956) was a French stage and film actress born in Paris.

== Filmography ==
- 1926 : Jim la houlette, roi des voleurs as the servant
- 1933 : Pas besoin d'argent
- 1934 : La Flambée
- 1934 : Jeanne as Mme Savignoll
- 1934 : Le Monde où l'on s'ennuie
- 1936 : Le cœur dispose
- 1936 : La Peur
- 1936 : Wells in Flames as Mme Yvolandi
- 1937 : Maman Colibri
- 1938 : Le Ruisseau
- 1938 : Mother Love as Mathilde
- 1938 : Vidocq
- 1940 : Nightclub Hostess as aunt Louise
- 1948 : The Shadow as the teinturière
- 1948 : Eternal Conflict as Mémé
- 1949 : Monseigneur as Mme de Ponthieux
- 1951 : The Real Culprit

== Theatre ==
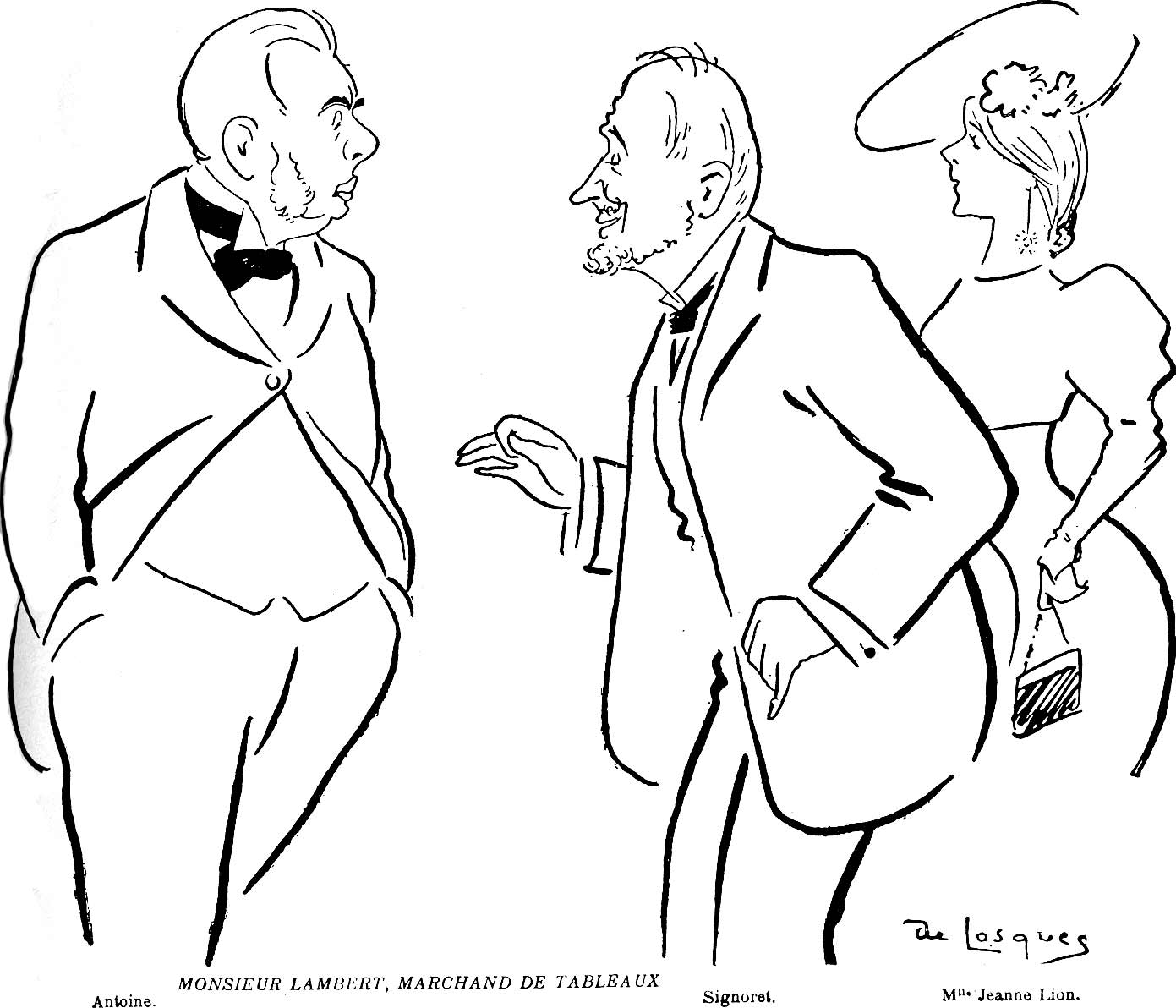
Jeanne Lion portrayed in a sketch by de Losques published in le Rire, 1905.

- 1904 : King Lear by William Shakespeare, directed by André Antoine, Théâtre Antoine
- 1905 : Vers l'amour by Léon Gandillot, directed by André Antoine, Théâtre Antoine
- 1906 : Hop o'my thumb by Richard Pryce and Frederick Fenn, directed by André Antoine, Théâtre Antoine
- 1908 : L'Alibi by Gabriel Trarieux, Théâtre de l'Odéon
- 1909 : Les Grands by Pierre Veber and Serge Basset, Théâtre de l'Odéon
- 1914 : La Victime by Fernand Vanderem and Franc-Nohain, Comédie des Champs-Élysées
- 1916 : L'Amazone by Henry Bataille, Théâtre de la Porte-Saint-Martin
- 1925 : La Chapelle ardente by Gabriel Marcel, directed by Gaston Baty, Théâtre du Vieux-Colombier
- 1934 : Les Temps difficiles by Édouard Bourdet, Théâtre de la Michodière
- 1935 : Rouge ! by Henri Duvernois, Théâtre Saint-Georges
- 1936 : Christian by Yvan Noé, Théâtre des Variétés
- 1937 : Victoria Regina by Laurence Housman, directed by André Brulé, Théâtre de la Madeleine
- 1938 : Frénésie by Charles de Peyret-Chappuis, directed by Charles de Rochefort, Théâtre Charles de Rochefort
- 1939 : Roi de France by Maurice Rostand, directed by Harry Baur, Théâtre de l'Œuvre
- 1946 : Divines Paroles by Ramón María del Valle-Inclán, directed by Marcel Herrand, Théâtre des Mathurins
- 1946 : And Then There Were None by Agatha Christie, directed by Roland Piétri, Théâtre Antoine
- 1947 : Passage du malin by François Mauriac, directed by Jean Meyer, Théâtre de la Madeleine
- 1948 : Marqué défendu by Marcel Rosset, directed by Charlie Gerval, Théâtre des Célestins
- 1949 : Une femme libre by Armand Salacrou, directed by Jacques Dumesnil, with Jacques Dumesnil, Yves Robert, Théâtre Saint-Georges
- 1950 : Une femme libre by Armand Salacrou, directed by Jacques Dumesnil, Théâtre des Célestins, tournée
- 1950 : Pourquoi pas moi by Armand Salacrou, directed by Jacques Dumesnil, Théâtre Édouard VII
- 1951 : Les Fourberies de Scapin by Molière, directed by Louis Jouvet, Théâtre des Célestins
- 1951 : L'Épreuve by Marivaux, directed by Pierre Bertin, Théâtre des Célestins
- 1952 : Feu Monsieur de Marcy by Raymond Vincy and Max Régnier, directed by Georges Douking, Théâtre de la Porte Saint-Martin
