= Daniel-Henry Kahnweiler =

German-born art collector and art dealer

- Daniel-Henry Kahnweiler, 1956
- Born: 25 June 1884; Mannheim, Baden, German Empire
- Died: 11 January 1979 (aged 94); Paris, France
- Occupations: Art dealer, historian
- Spouse(s): Léontine Alexandrine Godon, called Lucie

Daniel-Henry Kahnweiler (25 June 1884 – 11 January 1979) was a German-born art collector, and one of the most notable French art dealers of the 20th century. He became prominent as an art gallery owner in Paris beginning in 1907 and was among the first champions of Pablo Picasso, Georges Braque and the Cubist movement in art.

== Early life ==
Kahnweiler was born in 1884 in Mannheim, Baden to a prosperous Jewish family. His family had previously moved from Rockenhausen, a small village in the Palatinate. Kahnweiler grew up in Stuttgart and was trained to study finance and philosophy. Through contact with his great-uncle, Joseph Goldscheider, he was introduced to music and painting, encouraging him to visit European museums, where he discovered Boucher, Chardin, Rembrandt and Cranach. His upbringing and education at a German Gymnasium prepared him for his life as an art connoisseur and pragmatic businessman. Early employment in the family business of stock brokerage in Germany and Paris gave way to an interest in art collecting while Kahnweiler was still in his twenties. In 1902, he came to live in Paris and frequented the Louvre and the Luxembourg museums. At this time, Kahnweiler discovered Impressionist painting and in particular Cézanne, whom he valued as the beginner of a new style of painting. He became convinced that he wanted to be an art dealer, somebody like Ambroise Vollard. In 1904, he met his future wife, Lucie Godon (1882-1945), with whom he lived in a common-law relationship, her family being opposed to the marriage. He opened his first small art gallery (4 by 4 meters) in Paris in February 1907 at 28 rue Vignon, at age 23. There was a family precedent for such an enterprise, since his uncle Joseph Goldscheider, who ran a famous stock brokerage house in London, was a major art collector of traditional English art works and furniture.

== Art dealer ==
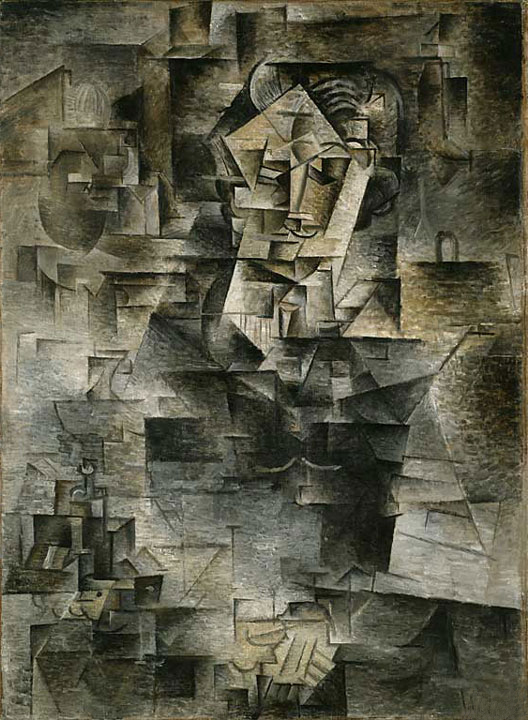
Pablo Picasso, 1910, Portrait of Daniel-Henry Kahnweiler, oil on canvas, Art Institute of Chicago

Kahnweiler is considered to have been one of the greatest supporters of the Cubist art movement through his activities as an art dealer and spokesman for artists. He was among the first people to recognize the importance and beauty of Picasso's Les Demoiselles d'Avignon and immediately wanted to buy it along with all of Picasso's works. Picasso wrote of Kahnweiler, "What would have become of us if Kahnweiler hadn't had a business sense?" Kahnweiler's appreciation of Picasso's talents was especially gratifying to the artist, since he was largely unknown and destitute at the time when many of his most famous works were created.

In his gallery, Kahnweiler supported many of the great artists of his time who found themselves without adequate recognition and little or no interest among collectors. Initial purchases included works by Kees van Dongen, André Derain, André Masson, Fernand Léger, Georges Braque, Juan Gris, Maurice de Vlaminck and several other artists of the same generation. To use his own word, Kahnweiler wanted to "defend" great artists, but only those who had no dealers and of whose talents he was convinced. Rather than exhibiting appealing works by established artists from the past and present, Kahnweiler championed burgeoning artists who had come from all over the globe to live and work in Montparnasse and Montmartre at the time. Thus Paul Cézanne, although a great artist, was considered too old to be represented, and his work was already represented by the dealer Ambroise Vollard in any case.

Kees van Dongen, c. 1907-08, Portrait of Daniel-Henry Kahnweiler, oil on canvas, Musée du Petit Palais, Geneva

Along with such men as Alfred Flechtheim, Paul Cassirer, Daniel Wildenstein, Léonce Rosenberg and Paul Rosenberg, Kahnweiler was one of the influential art connoisseurs of the 20th century. As a businessman, Kahnweiler pioneered many new methods of working with artists and art dealing; these are now established practices in the industry.

In 1907, when there were only half a dozen viable galleries in Paris, he made contracts with artists to buy all of their work in order to free them from financial worries and permit them to concentrate on their creative work. First meeting Picasso a few months after his gallery was launched, he became acquaintaned with Max Jacob, Georges Braque, Juan Gris, Fernand Léger, Guillaume Apollinaire. He met with them daily to discuss their work, photographed each work they produced (he felt it imperative to have a record), held exhibitions of their work and promoted their work internationally. Since he considered himself friends with many of them, he co-owned little sailing boats with his artists.

As part of his activities in promoting the work of emerging artists, Kahnweiler sponsored the first exhibition of the work of Georges Braque. He encouraged the practice of publishing Beaux Livres (beautiful books), in which a contemporary artist would illustrate a work of a contemporary writer. He expanded his presentations by bringing together artists, writers and poets to produce their works as a joint project in more than 40 books. Picasso, for example, illustrated the works of Max Jacob. As a publisher of art with literary works, he had no equal, and was the first to sponsor publications by Max Jacob, Guillaume Apollinaire, André Masson, Gertrude Stein, Pablo Picasso, and many others. In doing so, he launched many literary careers.

Kahnweiler's entrepreneurial abilities were so acute that by the 1950s his art gallery was among the top 100 French companies in terms of export figures.

== Kahnweiler and Hermann Rupf ==
In 1903, Kahnweiler got acquainted with the Swiss-born Hermann Rupf (1880-1962) as they were both training at the same bank in Frankfurt. When Kahnweiler opened his first gallery in Paris in 1907, Rupf who was working then in his family textile business in Bern, became one of Kahnweiler’s first clients, and remained in close contact with him all his life. The correspondence between Hermann Rupf and Kahnweiler lasted till Rupf’s death in 1962, numbering about 700 letters and postcards.

The couple of Hermann Rupf and his wife Margrit became the first Swiss private collectors to engage intensely with abstract art. Through Kahnweiler, they acquired works by Fauve artists (Othon Friesz and André Derain), the Cubists (George Braque, Pablo Picasso, Juan Gris and Fernand Léger) and works by Paul Klee, Wassily Kandinsky, Henri Laurens and André Masson. Apart from their collecting activities, Hermann and wife Margrit Rupf also championed artists and advised and supported many Swiss and French artists. In his capacity of art critic, Rupf played an important role in the dissemination of contemporary art. Since 1954, Hermann and Margrit Rupf collection is located at the Kunstmuseum Bern.

== Art history ==
Although the financial support for artists was an important contribution to art history, he was also a significant figure for his work as an art historian and eyewitness to the emergence of Cubism during the period 1907–1914. When working in Paris, his spare time was devoted to reading and understanding the history of art and aesthetics. He also spent his time visiting the city's museums and art galleries. Besides the museums in Paris, he took trips around the European continent to see what was being shown in museums and art galleries outside France. He gave his first interview on Cubism in 1912, and it was actual historical events that led to his career as a historian. There is a view that Kahnweiler's sensibility was such that his gallery, and the way he styled and developed it, was as much a Cubist gallery as were the paintings by Picasso and the other Cubist painters. Kahnweiler became the promoter of the “four musketeers of Cubism”: Picasso, Braque, Gris and Derain. In 1913 Derain painted a portrait of Lucie called “Portrait of Madame Kahnweiler” He was the first, with Wilhelm Uhde, to perceive the force of Picasso's “Demoiselles d'Avignon”, the founding canvas of Cubism which he saw in July 1907 in the studio of the Bateau-Lavoir

The gallery had a clear aesthetic position, uncompromising integrity, financial stability and creative development. During the years 1907-1914 his gallery was a central cradle for Cubism, not only to display the works, but where one also met the artists.

Concurrently, the primary means for avant-garde painters and sculptors to show their works to a wider audience remained the Salon des Indépendants and the Salon d'Automne. Kahnweiler forbade his 'gallery Cubists' from exhibiting at these major Salons, and by so doing, actually removed them from public view. From the viewpoint of the general public, Cubism came to be more associated with the 'Salon Cubists', such as Jean Metzinger, Albert Gleizes, Fernand Léger, Robert Delaunay, Henri Le Fauconnier, Marcel Duchamp and Francis Picabia.

== During World War I ==
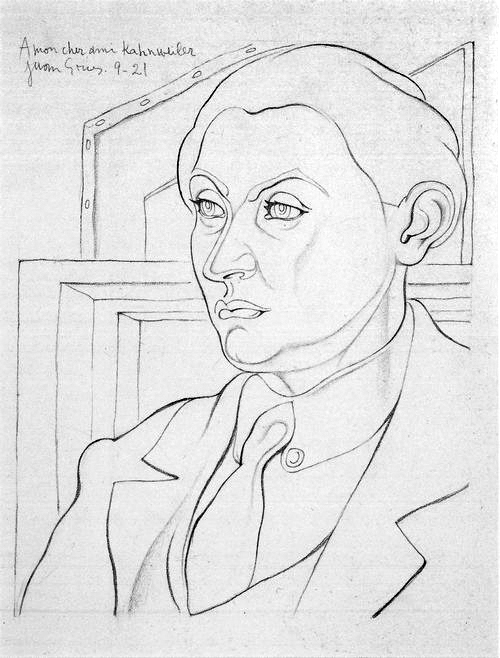
Pencil drawing of Kahnweiler by Juan Gris, 1921, Musée National d'Art Moderne, Paris

The outbreak of World War I in 1914 not only ruptured the Cubist experiments in art, but also forced Kahnweiler to live in exile in Switzerland. Not believing the war might break out, he did not follow Picasso's encouragement to become naturalized in France. When war was declared on August 3, 1914, he was on vacation in Rome, which he extended, disobeying his order to enlist in the German army. Then he also refused to fight for his adopted country, and, declared a deserter, fled to Switzerland with his partner Lucie Godon, to live in Bern in the premices provided by his long-time friend Hermann Rupf. Due to his German citizenship, he was considered an alien under French law.

Many German nationals living in France had their possessions sequestered by the French state. Refusing to take a position between the French and the Germans, he was considered an enemy of France and as a result, Kahnweiler's gallery and the collection of paintings were seized on December 12, 1914 as "prise de guerre" (“war trophy”), to be sold at auction in order to raise funds for the state. What was confiscated in 1914, was later sold by the government in a series of four public auctions supervised in part by Léonce Rosenberg (first three sales) and held at the Hôtel Drouot between 1921 and 1923. Approximately 3,000 items were sold, including 1,219 works by Braque, Gris, Léger, and Picasso.

Among these was Pablo Picasso's "Buffalo Bill," which Kahnweiler acquired from Picasso in 1912 and was auctioned at Hôtel Drouot in the "Fourth Sale of Sequestered Art," May 7–8, 1923, and a century later bought in auction at Christie's for $12,412,500 on Nov. 17, 2022.

While living in exile in Switzerland from late 1914 to early 1920, Kahnweiler was unable to continue his work as an art dealer, so he devoted his time to writing about art. Kahnweiler became a critic, publishing essays in art journals Das Kunstblatt, Die weissen Blätter and Der Cicerone, often under the pseudonym Daniel Henry. Chief among the books he published is Der Weg zum Kubismus, an early key reference work for the study of Cubism. He also wrote Confessions esthétiques. Writing becoming a passion he continued over his lifetime, and he authored hundreds of books and major articles. In subsequent years, Kahnweiler produced an early monograph on Gris (1929) as well as editions created by poets, writers, and artists and beautifully illustrated by Kahnweiler’s gallery painters. The second period of enforced writing came during a period of internal exile caused by the events of World War II.

== The inter-war years and “Les dimanches de Boulogne” ==
After the war, and despite the hostility of his family, he officially married Lucie Godon in Bern on July 2, 1919. Kahnweilers returned to Paris in February 1920.

His assets and his gallery being in sequestration, he joined forces with his close friend and business partner André Cahen, who was also known as André Simon, and on September 1, 1920, opened “Galerie Simon” under the latter's name, at no.29 bis, rue d'Astorg. The gallery remained open until 1941 when Kahnweiler’s stepdaughter Louise Leiris (née Godon) purchased it in an effort to save it from liquidation as a Jewish firm, renaming it into “Galerie Louise Leiris”.

In March 1921, the Kahnweilers moved to Boulogne-sur-Seine at 12 rue de la Mairie (now rue de l'Ancienne-Mairie) where he hosted a social gathering, the "Sundays of Boulogne", frequented by the art critic Maurice Raynal, theater painter André Masson, painter Suzanne Roger and her husband André Beaudin, the sculptor Jacques Lipchitz, the composer Erik Satie, the playwright Armand Salacrou, the writers and poets Antonin Artaud, Charles-Albert Cingria, Georges Limbour, architect Le Corbusier, the filmmaker Roland Tual, dadaists Tristan Tzara and Robert Desnos. In 1922, Max Jacob introduced him to André Malraux, and Kahnweiler hired Malraux as an editor at the “Galerie Simon”. In April, the painter Juan Gris and his wife Josette moved to live at Boulogne-sur-Seine and joined the "Sundays".

Kahnweiler published young authors: André Malraux, illustrated by Fernand Léger; Raymond Radiguet, illustrated by Henri Laurens then Juan Gris; Antonin Artaud, illustrated by Élie Lascaux; Armand Salacrou and Tristan Tzara, illustrated by Juan Gris; Georges Limbour, Michel Leiris, Robert Desnos and Georges Bataille, illustrated by André Masson.

In 1925, writer, poet and critic Michel Leiris became a member of the family by marrying Louise, the natural daughter of Lucie Kahnweiler, who was Daniel-Henry's secretary. The young couple was accommodated in a room in Kahnweiler’s house.

As the years passed, “Les dimanches de Boulogne” were accommodating fewer guests, and on the death of Juan Gris, on May 11, 1927, the "Sundays" ended definitively.

In 1937, Kahnweiler benefited from the naturalization policy of Léon Blum's government and became a French citizen.

== The World War II years ==
When on May 13, 1940, the German troops crossed the French border, the Kahnweilers, who had been under no illusions about Hitler's plans since 1933, on June 12, 1940 fled Paris for the Abbey of Saint-Léonard-de-Noblat, where they remained in hiding until 1943, not contacting anyone and receiving only the extremely tight circle of the most trusted friends. He remained there in concealment. "Under the clouds from the gas chambers," as he put it in his seminal work on Juan Gris re-written and edited during this period.

After the German invasion, the decrees of 16 and 22 July 1940 stripped Kahnweiler of his acquired French citizenship as a Jew. His son-in-law, Michel Leiris, came to live in his house in Boulogne-sur-Seine to avoid expropriation. Following the decree of 2 June 1941 imposing the "Aryanization of Jewish property", Kahnweiler sold his gallery on 1 July to Louise Leiris, his wife's natural daughter whom they had raised together, to avoid a second sequestration by the French state.

In the spring of 1943, Kahnweiler returned to Paris. He hid with the Leiris family, on the fourth floor of 53bis, Quai des Grands-Augustins. Following a tip-off, the Kahnweilers' house in Saint-Léonard-de-Noblat in Haute-Vienne department was searched by the Gestapo. They were looking for weapons. The house was looted, but the paintings were spared. The Gestapo raid forced the Kahnweilers to flee Paris again and to hide in Lagupie in the south-west of France where the friends of Leiris provided a cover for them. The Kahnweilers returned to Paris, to Quai des Grands-Augustins, only at the beginning of October 1944, long after Paris was liberated on August 25, 1944 by the American troops and the French armored division of General Philippe Leclerc.

Lucie Godon-Kahnweiler died on May 14, 1945, of cancer. Daniel-Henry Kahnweiler distanced himself from his business as an art dealer, but wrote about art, Picasso's sculpture, Paul Klee, and modern art.

== At the end ==
Kahnweiler was very prolific as an author, but never produced a full autobiography. There was, however, a series of interviews first aired on French television, then published and translated as a book under the title Mes galleries et mes peintres ("My galleries and my painters"). For his 80th birthday, a Festschrift was published with contributions by the world's leading philosophers, art historians, and artists, all of whom emphasized the vital importance of his unique contribution to art history – an importance still not yet fully appreciated, probably due to the fact that he has been viewed mostly as an art dealer and not as an art historian. This situation has been aggravated because some of his major works on aesthetics were either never translated into English or badly translated. The omission of key elements of a proper understanding of Cubism and focus on small and sensational elements of his complex relationship with Picasso has led to a flawed understanding of the ideas he put forward in these writings.

Although revered by artists for his business and aesthetic sense and respected by art dealers and art historians, the true impact of his life and work has yet to be recognized, despite a 1988 biography by Pierre Assouline.

In March 1957, the Galerie Louise Leiris moved to 47 rue de Monceau. He lived with the Leiris family until his death in 1979 in Paris, aged 94.

== Sources ==
- John Richardson, A Life of Picasso: The Prodigy, 1881–1906, Publ. Alfred A. Knopf, 1991, ISBN 978-0-307-26666-8
- John Richardson, A Life of Picasso: The Cubist Rebel, 1907-1916, Publ. Alfred A. Knopf, 1991, ISBN 978-0-307-26665-1
- Malcolm Gee, Dealers, critics, and collectors of modern painting: aspects of the Parisian art market between 1910 and 1930, London, Garland, 1981.
