= Georges Valmier =

French painter (1885–1937)

- Born: 11 April 1885; Angoulême, France
- Died: 25 March 1937 (aged 51); Montmartre, France
- Education: Ecole des Beaux-Arts (trained under Luc-Olivier Merson)
- Known for: Painting
- Notable work: La Fillette au piano (1920); Composition (1926); Le Marin (1929); Mouvements synchronisés (1936)
- Movement: Impressionism, Cubism, Abstractionism
- Spouse: Jeanne Bliss Pessina (m. 1908)
- Patrons: Léonce Rosenberg

Georges Valmier (11 April 1885 – 25 March 1937) was a French painter. His work encompassed the great movements in the modern history of painting, starting with Impressionism in his early years, then Cubism which he discovered when he was around 25 years old, and finally Abstractionism from 1921. He also designed sets and costumes for theater and ballet, and models for fabrics, carpets, and other objects. His oil paintings do not exceed 300 in number, since Valmier died prematurely at the age of 51. His paintings were the culmination of many preparatory drafts in gouaches, multiple versions of which are works in themselves and reflect his penchant for colors and inventive shapes. Valmier was also a musician. He performed the works of Debussy, Ravel, Fauré, and Satie at major concerts and in churches, and had a decisive influence on the career of André Jolivet.

== Life and work ==
Georges Valmier was born in Angoulême on 11 April 1885. He moved with his family to Montmartre in 1890, and was brought up in an environment of love of the arts, including music and painting.

Valmier performed military service during 1904–1905, and after his return, he discovered the work of Cézanne at an exhibition of his works at the Salon d'Automne in 1907. He entered the Ecole des Beaux-Arts, where he trained under Luc-Olivier Merson until 1909. He married Jeanne Bliss Pessina in 1908; their daughter Martha was born in 1912. Valmier was drafted into the military in 1914 and assigned to service in Toul, where he became acquainted with Albert Gleizes, Paul Colin, and the composer Florent Schmitt.

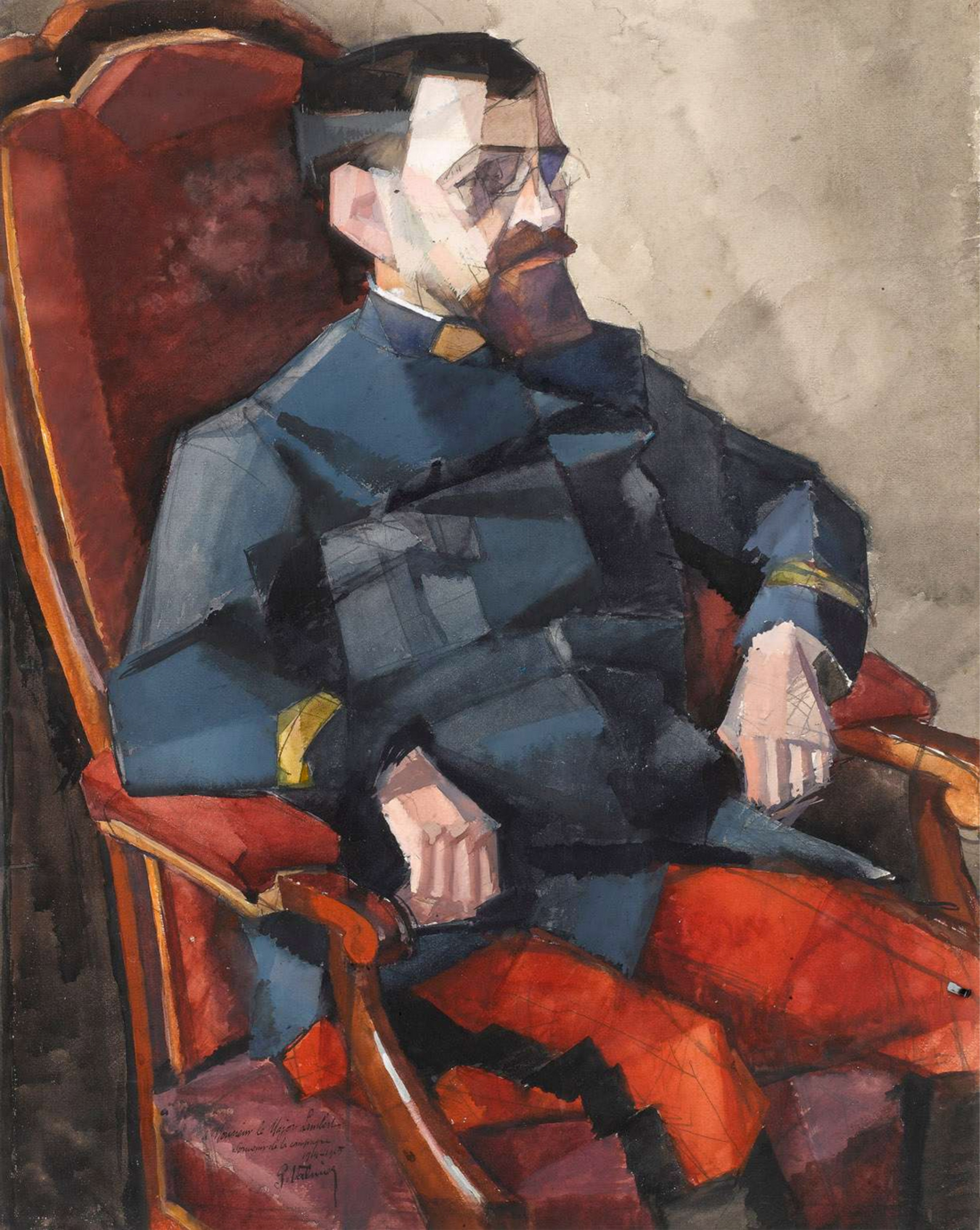
Georges Valmier, 1914–15, Portrait de Commandant Lambert, gouache and watercolor over pencil, 63.2 x 50.8 cm, Triton Foundation, Netherlands

Professor of Physiology from the Faculty of Nancy in charge of the infirmary at Toul, Dr. Lambert, was more enthusiastic about his portrait by Valmier than that of Gleizes, who writes:

The portrait that he [Valmier] made of the Doctor was excellent, a very good likeness that remained in the classical idiom. But for myself, I wanted to remain faithful to Cubism and not to play games with my own convictions. So the portrait I envisaged [Portrait of an Army Doctor] was a little surprising for the good doctor's habits of mind. He did not conceal his way of thinking, but he let me do what I wanted. (Albert Gleizes, Souvenirs, c. 1942)

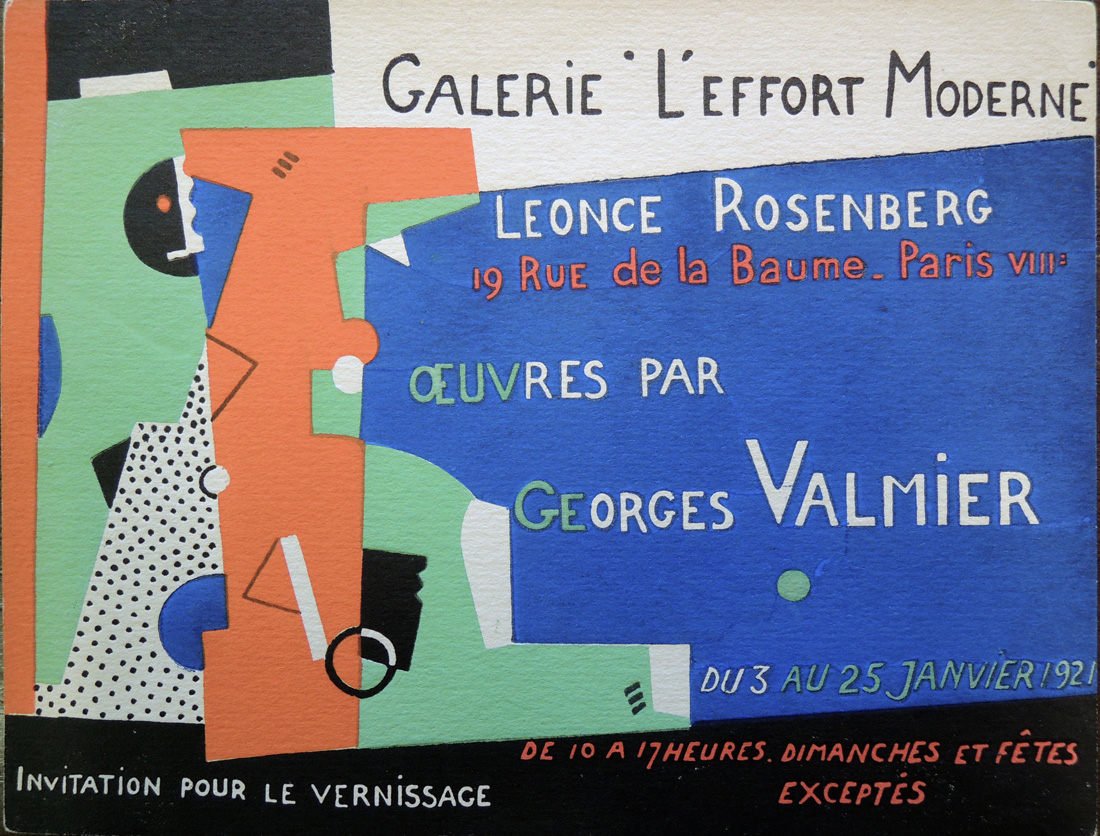
Georges Valmier, Galerie de L’Effort Moderne, January 1921

Upon his return to Montmartre in 1918, Valmier met Léonce Rosenberg, who soon recognized the high quality of his work and took him under contract. Rosenberg organized a solo exhibition for Valmier in 1921 at his Galerie de L'Effort Moderne. From 1923 to 1927, under the patronage of Rosenberg, his works were regularly published in the Bulletin de L'Effort moderne. In 1928, Rosenberg entrusted him with the decoration of the dining room of his apartment at rue de Longchamp in Paris, which also houses his art collection.

The early 1930s marked Valmier's final transition to abstractionism. He was an early member of the board of Abstraction-Création, along with Jean Arp, Albert Gleizes, Jean Hélion, František Kupka, Leon Tutundjian, and Georges Vantongerloo, as well as the Hungarian painter Alfred Reth, with whom he jointly created works titled Forms in Space.

In 1936, Valmier began working on three monumental works for the decoration of the theater of the Palace of Railways for the World Expo held in Paris in 1937.

Valmier suffered ill-health since 1932, and died on 25 March 1937 in Montmartre.

== Gallery ==
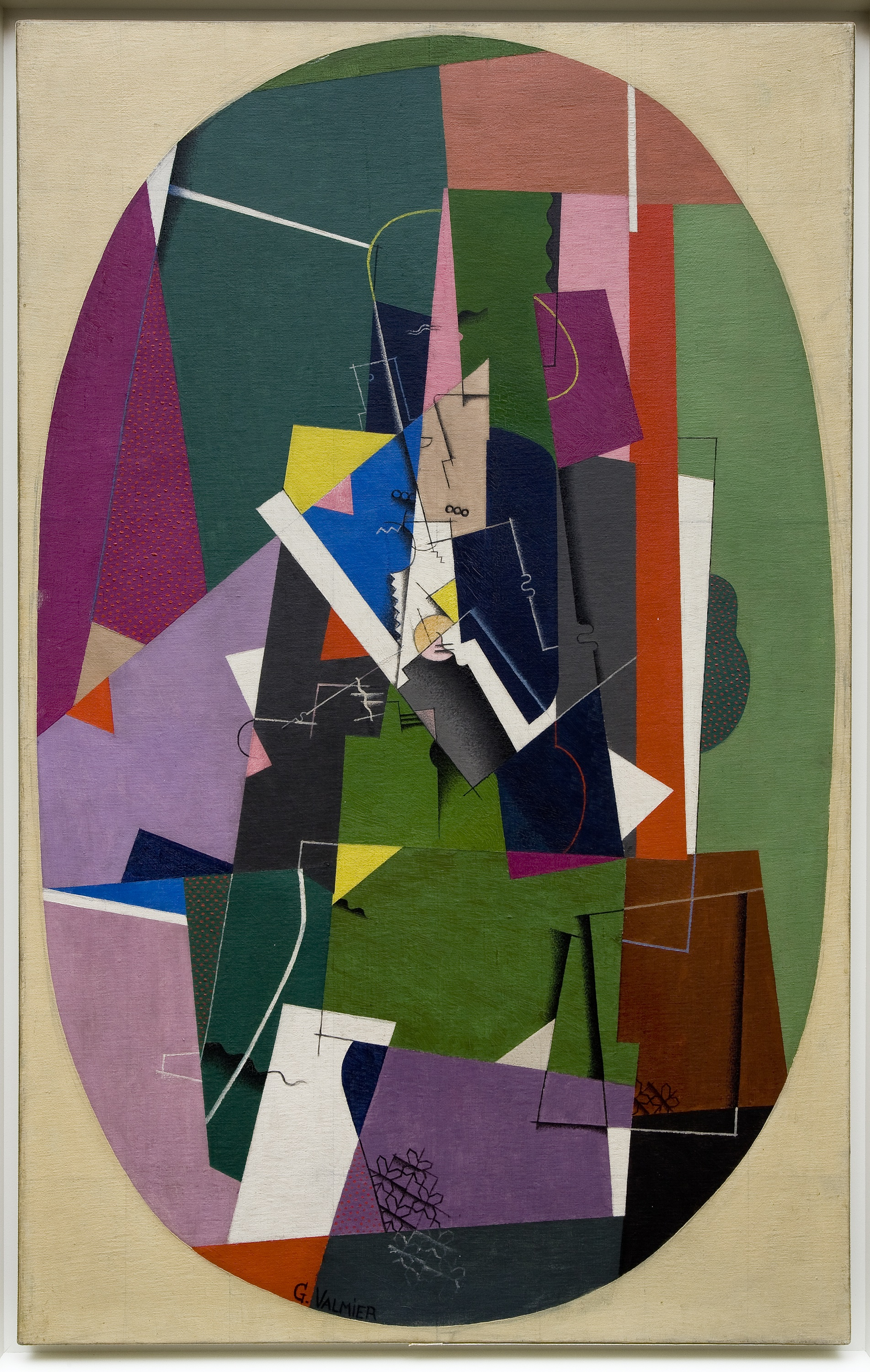
Fugue, ca. 1920, oil on canvas, Solomon R. Guggenheim Museum

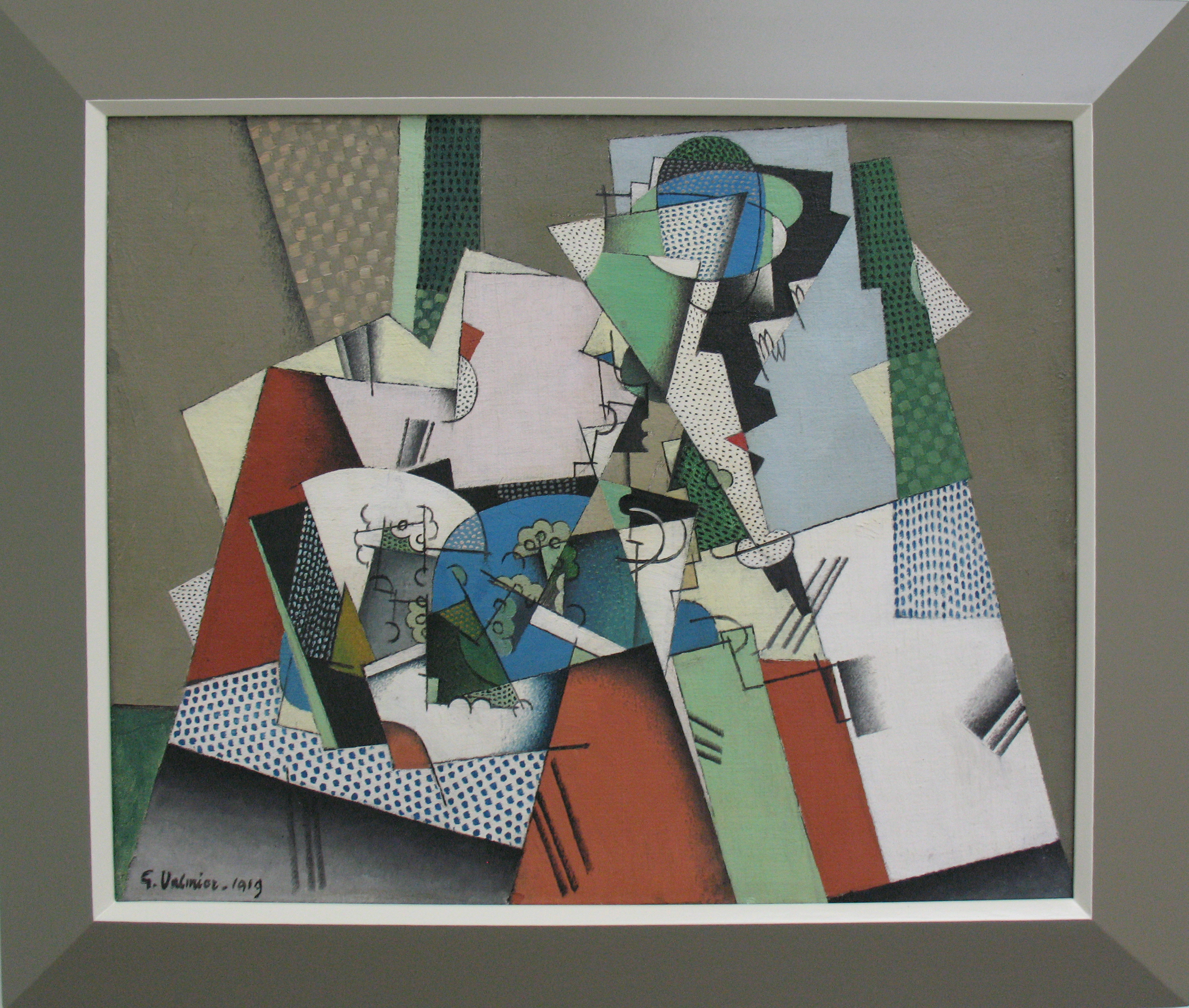
Geometrical Still Life I, 1919, oil on canvas, Kröller-Müller Museum

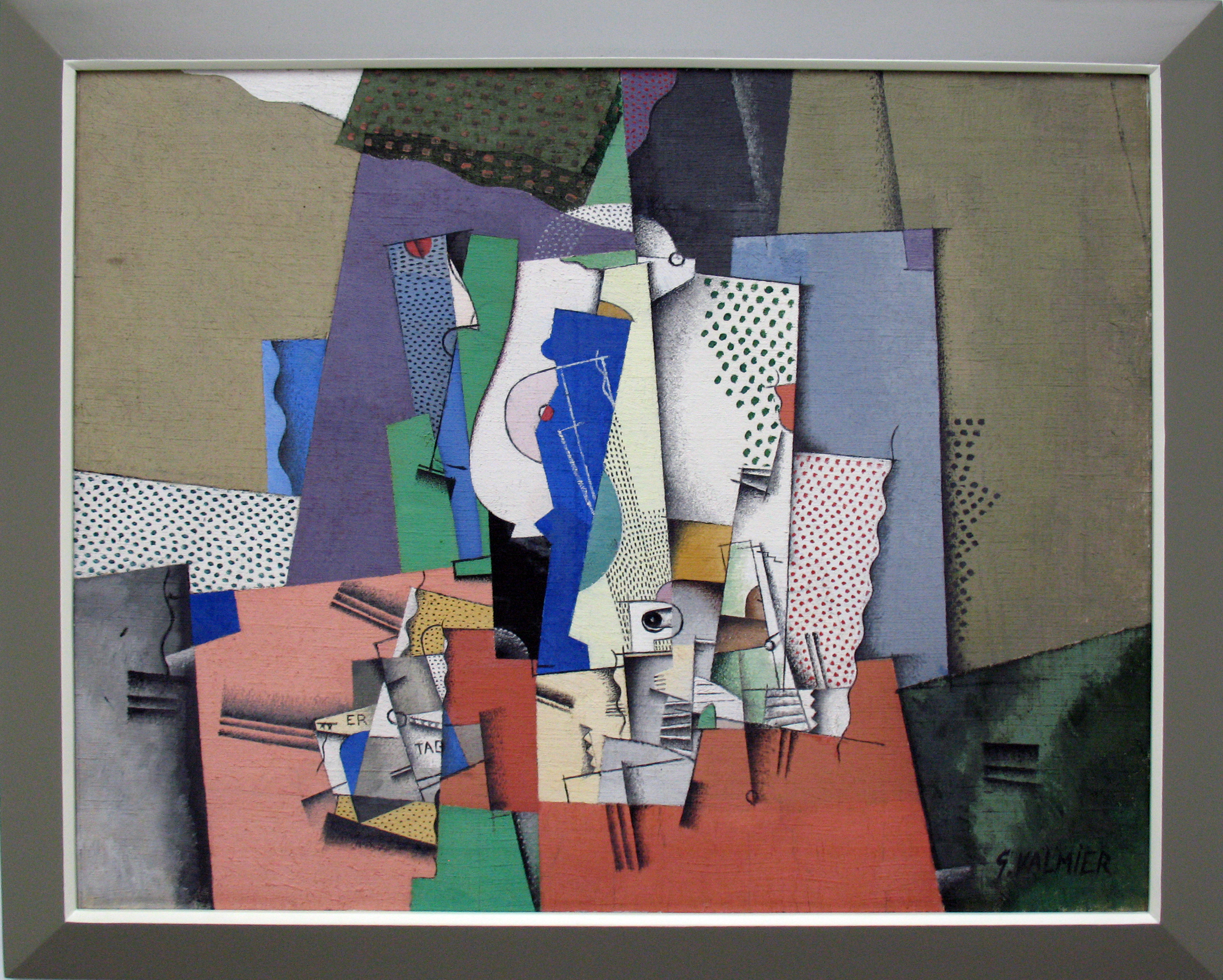
Geometrical Still Life II, 1920, oil on canvas, Kröller-Müller Museum

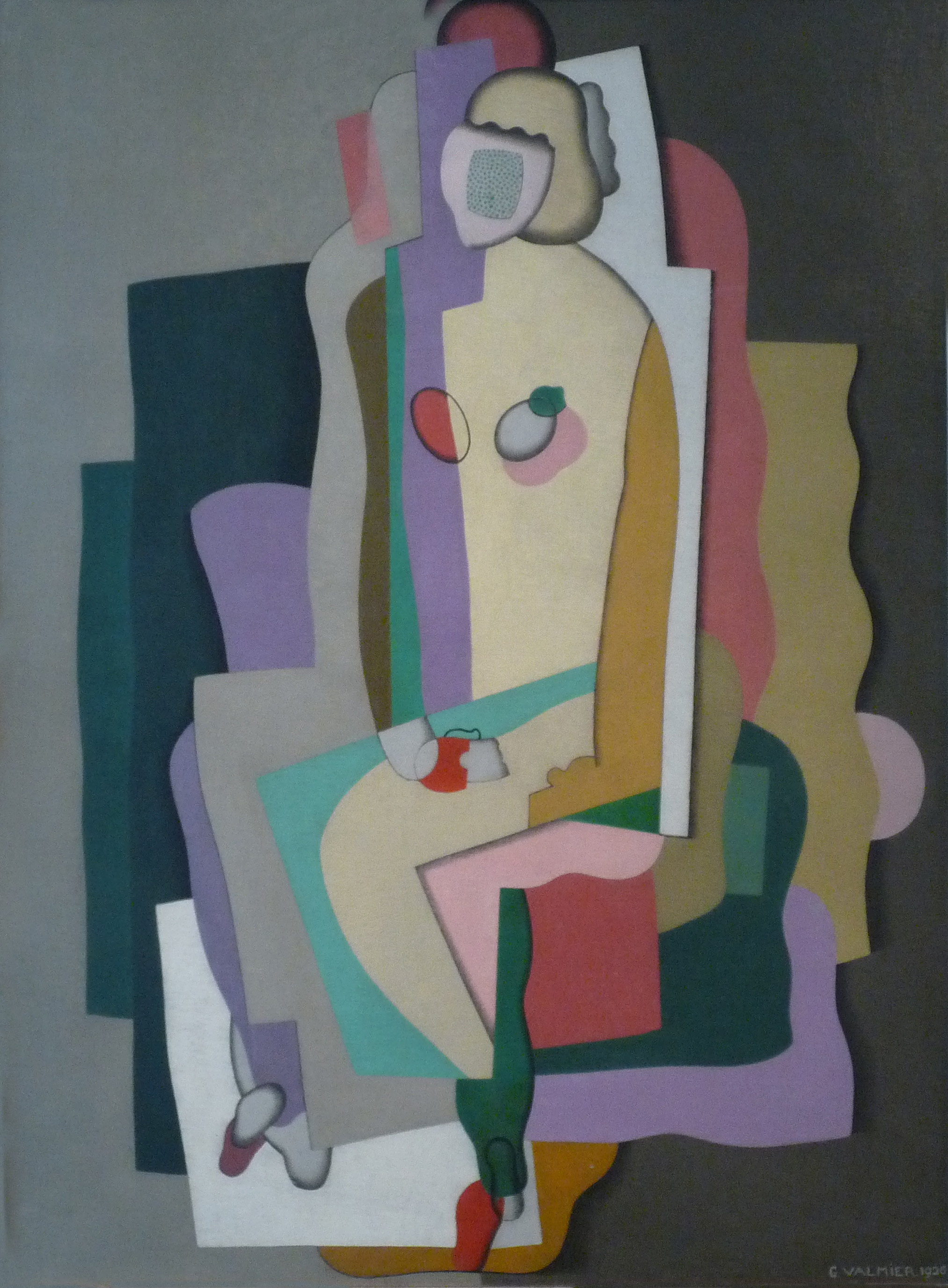
Composition, 1926, oil on canvas, Musée des beaux-arts de Nancy

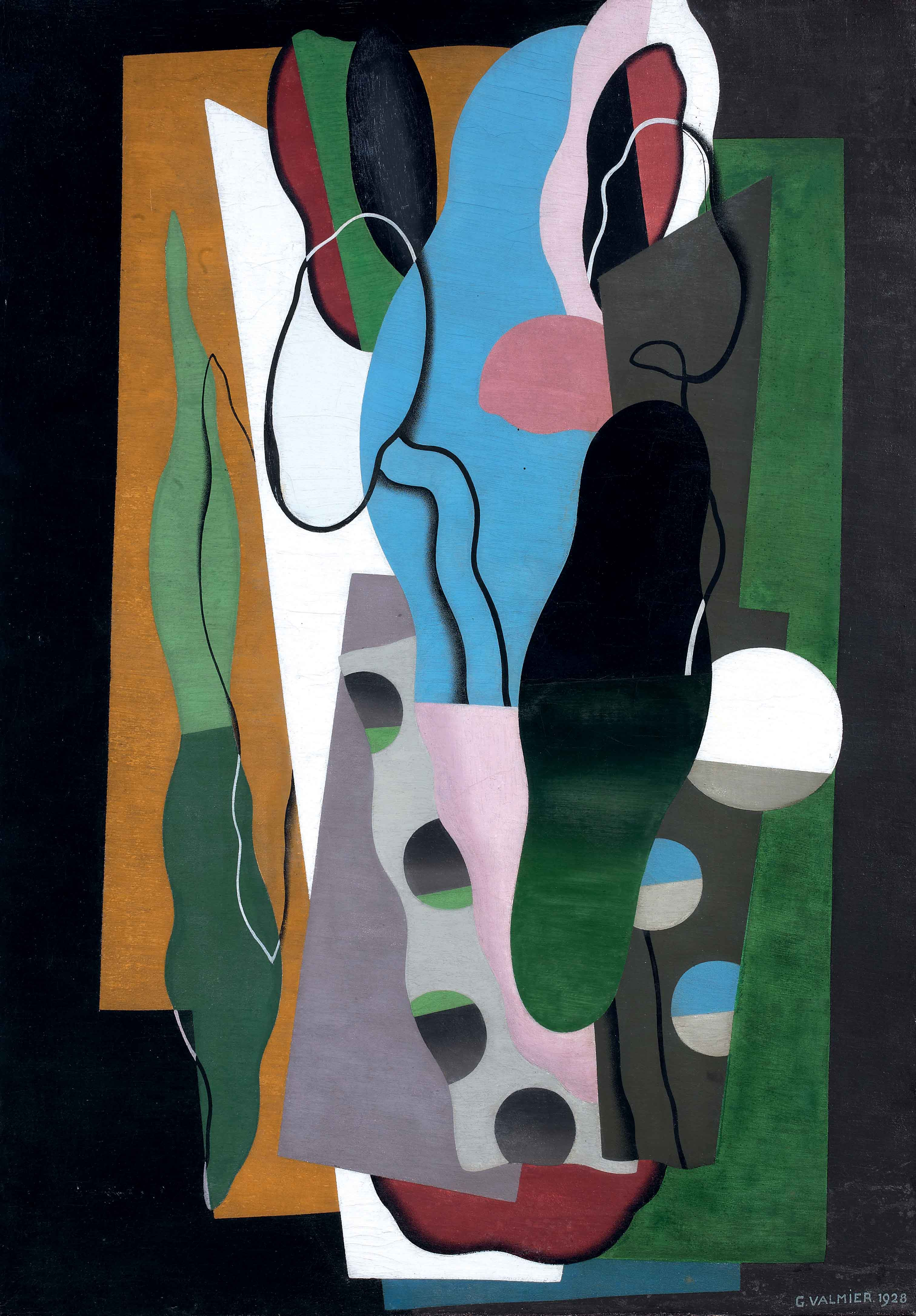
Les Tulipes ("The Tulips"), 1928, oil on canvas, private collection

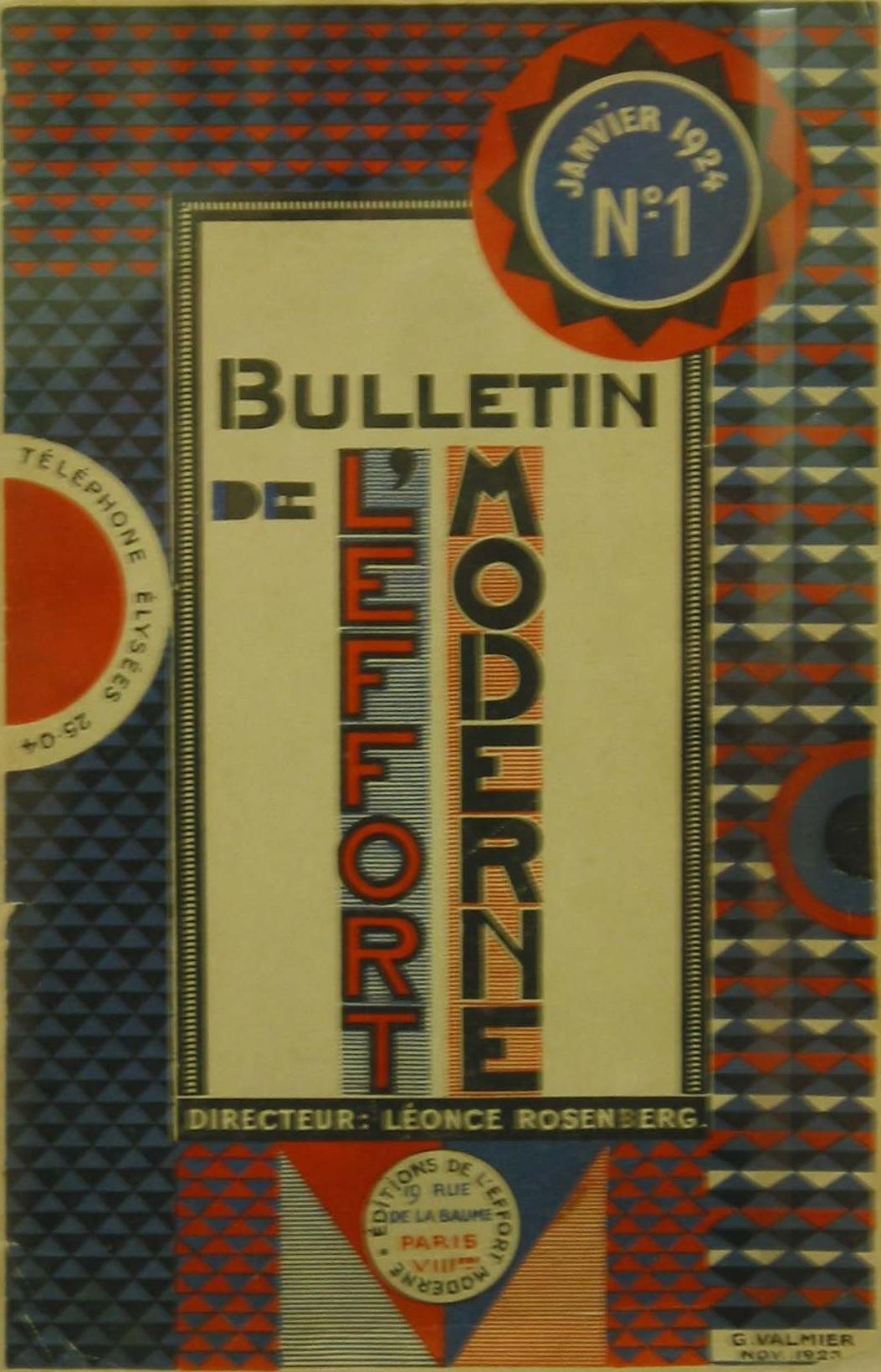
Bulletin de l'Effort Moderne, No. 1, January 1924. Cover design by Georges Valmier, November 1923

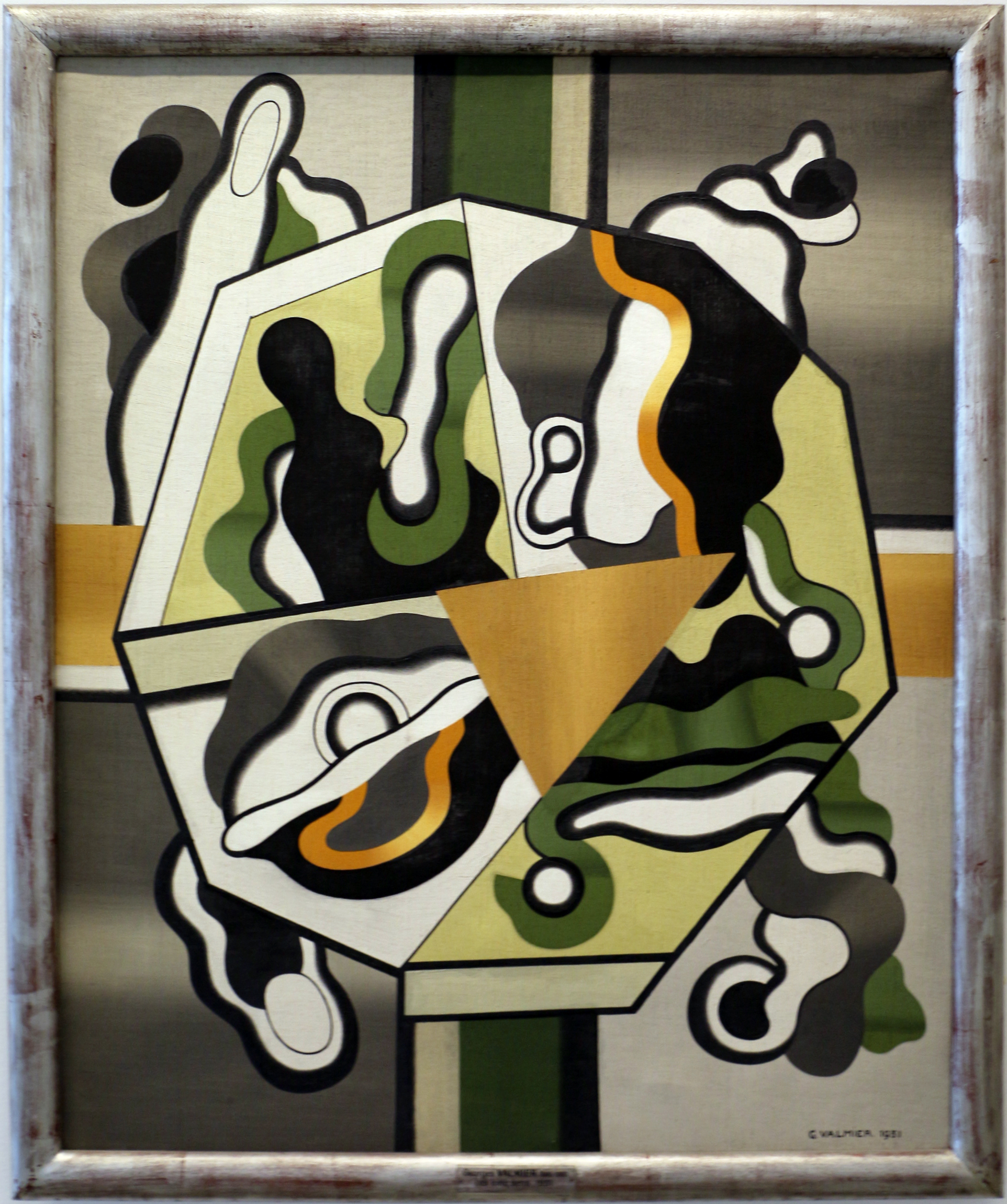
I Cinque Sensi, 1931

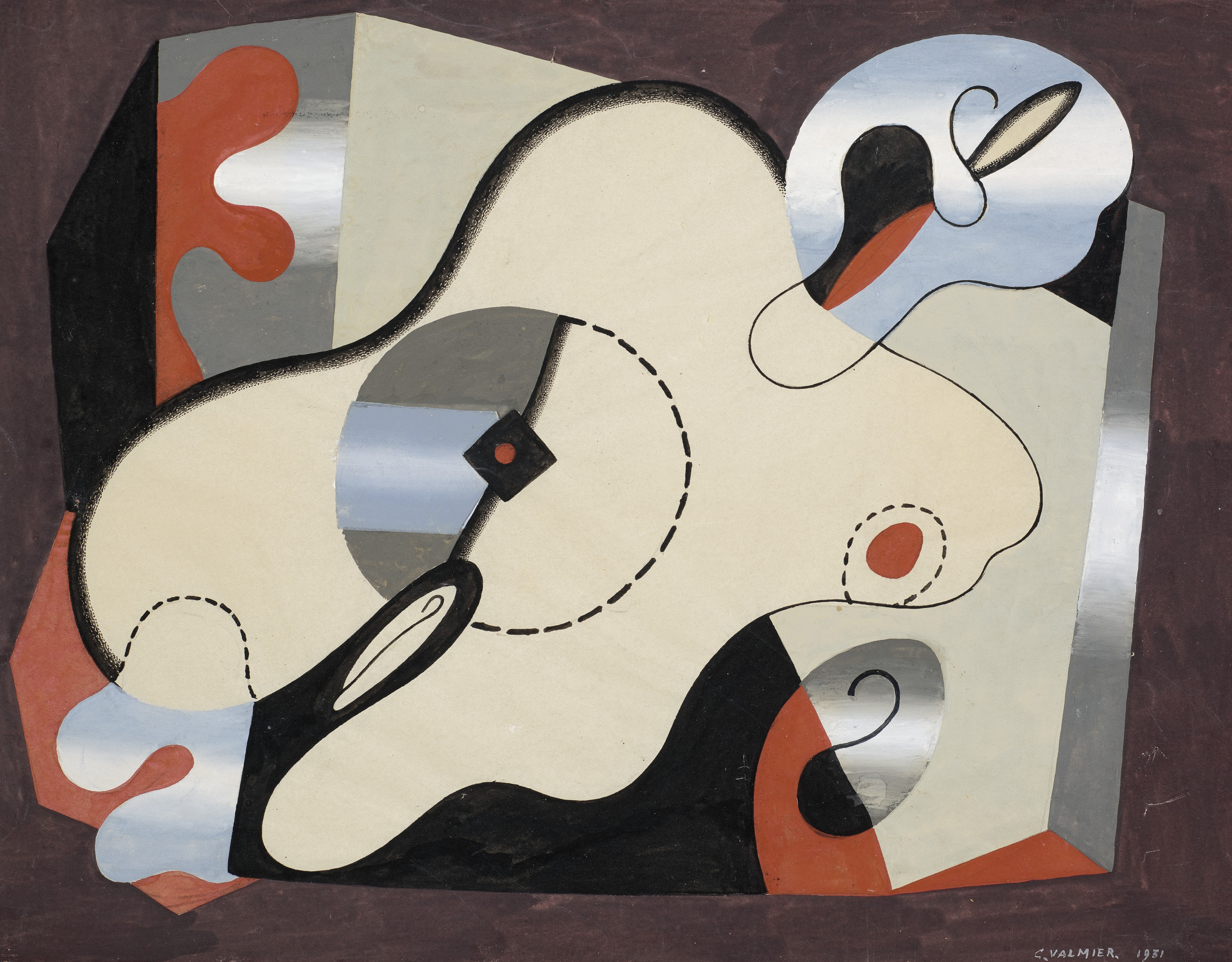
Abstract Composition, 1931

== Additional works ==
- La Fillette au piano ("The girl at the piano"), 1920
- Composition, 1926
- Le Marin, 1929
- Mouvements synchronisés ("Synchronized movements"), 1936
- Projets de décors de théâtre ("Theatrical scenes projects")
- Projets de costumes de théâtre ("Theatrical costumes projects")

== Art collections ==
Valmier's works are on display at several museums, including:

- Centre national d'art et de culture Georges-Pompidou, Musée national d'Art moderne, Paris
- Musée d'Art et d'Histoire, Cholet
- Musée d'art, histoire et archéologie, Évreux
- Musée d'art moderne de la Ville de Paris, Paris
- Musée Tavet-Delacour, Pontoise

== Recent exhibitions ==
- Melki Gallery, Paris, 1973
- Galerie Zlotowski, Paris, April – June 2006

== Sources ==
- Denise Bazetoux, Catalogue Raisonné de l'œuvre de Georges Valmier ("Catalogue Raisonné of the works of Georges Valmier"), Noema, 1993.
- Albert Lévy (Ed.), Collection Décors et couleurs ("Collection of sets and colors") (Album No. 1 by G. Valmier)
