= Léonce Rosenberg =

French art dealer and art historian (1879–1947)

Jean Metzinger, 1924, Portrait de Léonce Rosenberg, pencil on paper, 50 x 36.5 cm, Musée National d'Art Moderne, Centre Georges Pompidou, Paris

Léonce Rosenberg (12 September 1879 in Paris – 31 July 1947 in Neuilly-sur-Seine) was an art collector, writer, publisher and art dealer. He was a supporter and promoter of the cubists, especially during World War I and in the years immediately after.

== Early life ==
The son of an antique dealer Alexandre Rosenberg and brother of the gallery owner Paul Rosenberg (21 rue de la Boétie, Paris), Léonce Rosenberg attended the Lycée Rollin in Paris followed by commercial training in Antwerp and London as well as travels to Berlin, Vienna and New York. Léonce Rosenberg took the opportunity to visit galleries and museums to broaden his artistic knowledge and appreciation, and to develop contacts in the art world.

After returning to Paris he worked with his brother Paul in the family business. In 1906 Léonce and his brother took over the running of the family gallery, then on Avenue de l'Opéra and which had been in existence since 1872. It specialised in 19th- and early 20th-century art, including Impressionist and Post-Impressionist paintings.

The two brothers parted company commercially in 1910, with Paul continuing from new premises at 21 Rue de la Boétie while Léonce opened his own business, called Haute Epoque, at 19 Rue de la Baume, dealing in a range of objects from French antiques to archaeological pieces to Persian miniatures.

Léonce Rosenberg, however, soon began increasingly to be drawn to the avant garde experimentation of which Paris was the centre, and he began acquiring works by Cubist artists, bought mainly from the gallery of Daniel-Henry Kahnweiler, who was at the time the primary dealer and promoter of the Cubists. By 1914 his collection included works by Pablo Picasso, Auguste Herbin and Juan Gris, as well as examples of the types of Asian, Egyptian and African art that were firing the avant garde imagination.

== World War I and its aftermath ==
World War I proved to be the defining opportunity of Léonce Rosenberg's career.

Even before the war, growing anti-German sentiment and the role of German dealers in the rise of Cubism attracted hostility and led to Cubism being characterised as a German movement, even though most of the artists were French or Spanish. The outbreak of war also drove many of the artists who made up the avant garde circle to leave Paris. Some were called up to fight. Some left for the south of France while others, especially those with German connections or who were not French citizens, dispersed to Spain, Portugal and even America.

Jean Metzinger, invitation card for the exhibition at Léonce Rosenberg's Galerie de L'Effort Moderne, January 1919

The same was true of many of the collectors and dealers. Galleries closed. Daniel-Henry Kahnweiler, who until the war was the primary dealer for many of the Cubists, was left stranded in Switzerland during the war. As a German citizen he couldn't return to France, and his collection was seized by the French government. It left Kahnweiler's roster of artists without their livelihood.

In stepped Léonce Rosenberg. He had begun to collect avant garde, especially Cubist, art before the war, but he now stepped up this activity with the encouragement of André Level, Pablo Picasso and Juan Gris, who were all instrumental in persuading him to fill the hole left by Kahnweiler.

Even while serving in 1916 and 1917 as an auxiliary army volunteer based in Meudon and English interpreter on the Somme front, he continued during his periods of leave to buy paintings by Picasso, Georges Braque, Juan Gris, Auguste Herbin and Fernand Léger. He also began to prepare for the end of the war. By the end of 1916 he had managed to sign contracts with Jacques Lipchitz, Henri Laurens, Diego Rivera, Auguste Herbin, Juan Gris, Jean Metzinger and Georges Braque. Fernand Léger followed later, in 1918. Léonce Rosenberg also established commercial relationships with Gino Severini, Henri Hayden and María Blanchard.

His relationship with Picasso was less formal. Although for a time he bought and sold paintings by Picasso, no contract was ever signed. And although Picasso was among those who had initially encouraged Léonce Rosenberg to step into the breach left by Kahnweiler, Picasso himself decided after the war instead to sign up with Léonce's brother Paul, who had begun to take an increasing interest in modern artists for whom there was already an established demand. It was the start of an increasingly intense commercial rivalry between the two brothers.

Léonce Rosenberg's wartime support, when no one else would take the risk, was a lifeline for many of the avant garde artists, who would have been left without a livelihood following the forced absence from France of Kahnweiler, their previous commercial outlet. Léonce Rosenberg was later able to boast: "During the entire duration of the war and even while mobilized, I subsidized, by continuous purchases, the entire Cubist movement."

Kahnweiler himself later stated that Léonce Rosenberg had taken on "the task that I could no longer fulfill: the defense of Cubism."

It was by no means a straightforward handing over of the baton, however. There was still the matter of Kahnweiler's pre-war stock that had been seized by the French government as a "prise de guerre". Léonce Rosenberg managed in 1921 to secure a role as "expert" in helping to supervise the public auction of Kahnweiler's collection and that of another prominent German collector and dealer, Wilhelm Uhde. Kahnweiler had returned to Paris in 1920 and set up in business again with the help of an old friend. Rosenberg hoped to preserve his newly gained position as the main dealer for the Cubists by preventing his chief competitor from re-acquiring his stock. He also thought that the prices the Cubists could command would rise.

On this last calculation he was sorely mistaken. Around 3,000 items were sold over a series of four auctions from 1921 to 1923 at the Hôtel Drouot, one of the leading Parisian auction houses. They included more than 1,200 works by Braque, Gris, Léger, and Picasso. Bidding was lacklustre, mainly because many of the potential buyers had little money and because the market became saturated through the rapid sale of so many paintings. Although Léonce Rosenberg was able to expand his own stock to some extent at knockdown prices, Kahnweiler managed to pick up most of the works by Gris and Braque that were up for auction.

Léonce Rosenberg's role in all this angered many in the Cubist circle. It alienated some of the very artists who had contracted to Rosenberg during the war but who still felt some loyalty to their original dealer. It didn't help that the auctions also weakened the prices they could command. Braque, Gris and Lipchitz were among those who left Rosenberg in the fallout from the Hôtel Drouot auctions.

== Galerie de L'Effort Moderne ==
Auguste Herbin, Galerie de L'Effort Moderne, exhibition invitation, March 1918

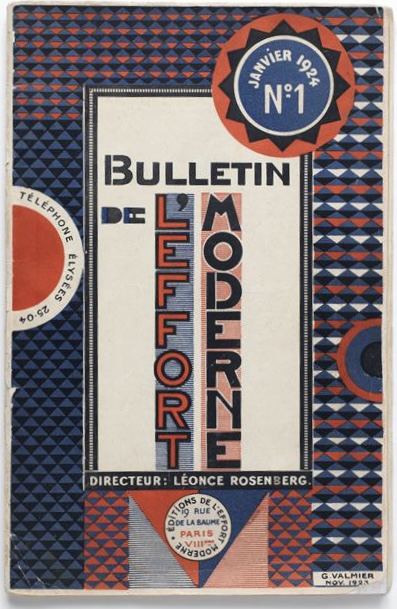
Cover of the first issue of the Bulletin de L'Effort Moderne, designed by Georges Valmier

In early 1918 Léonce Rosenberg renamed his gallery the Galerie de L'Effort Moderne and recast his business to focus on avant garde art, especially Cubism.

Its inaugural exhibition, from March 1 to 22, 1918 was dedicated to the work of Auguste Herbin. And in the months following the 11 November 1918 Armistice, Rosenberg mounted a rapid succession of high-profile exhibitions showcasing the artists he had signed up. It was the turn of Henri Laurens in December 1918, with Jean Metzinger, Fernand Léger, Georges Braque, Juan Gris, Gino Severini and Picasso following during the course of 1919. There were also exhibitions outside Paris, including of the L'Effort Moderne Cubists in Geneva in 1920 and the first one-man show of Picasso's work in the United Kingdom, in 1921.

This campaign had to do more than simply market a commercial product. There were those who actively sought to have Cubism - or at least the L'Effort Moderne brand of it - wiped from the artistic map. A concerted assault was mounted by hostile critics including André Salmon and Louis Vauxcelles, through the pages of journals such as Le Carnet de la Semaine. It was a battle as much for the minds of those who influenced taste and trends in the Parisian art market as for the pockets of those with the money to spend in that market.

In mounting the first post-war Cubist exhibitions at L'Effort Moderne, Léonce Rosenberg managed to re-establish Cubism as a force within avant garde art, in the face of claims to the contrary by hostile critics. According to art historian Christopher Green, "this was an astonishingly complete demonstration that Cubism had not only continued between 1914 and 1917, having survived the war, but was still developing in 1918 and 1919 in its 'new collective form' marked by 'intellectual rigor'. In the face of such a display of vigour, it really was difficult to maintain convincingly that Cubism was even close to extinction".

Rosenberg had set out to present Cubism after the war as a "collective synthesis" rather than merely a group of disparate though visually similar artists assembled by a dealer. They had a clear theoretical framework. Juan Gris was the intellectual driver, Rosenberg the publicist, simplifying and amplifying the message. In Cubisme et tradition, published as a preface to an exhibition of L'Effort Moderne Cubists in Geneva in 1920, Rosenberg associated Cubist art with Plato's eternal forms, "beautiful in itself". He sought to tie Cubism firmly to a French classicism, traced back through Cézanne and beyond, rather than something foreign, or worse, German.

L'Effort Moderne was not just a dealer's gallery. It was also an umbrella for a wide range of related activities aimed at raising the profile of its artists. There were regular literary and musical events designed to draw in the Parisian cultural elite. The first of these, a reading by Blaise Cendrars and performance by Erik Satie, took place in February 1919 during Fernand Léger's exhibition.

Most notably, L'Effort Moderne was also a publishing house, Éditions de L'Effort Moderne. This published a series of books featuring not only the gallery's artists, including Braque, Gris, and Léger, but also closely associated avant-garde poets such as Max Jacob, Pierre Reverdy, and Blaise Cendrars. 1924 saw the launch of an illustrated art journal, Bulletin de l'Effort Moderne. By 1927, when it ceased publication, it had run to 40 issues. It was a platform not only for Rosenberg's own views and the promotion of his artists but also a forum for critical debate and the theories underpinning the artists' work. Contributors included Piet Mondrian, Gino Severini, Giorgio de Chirico and Albert Gleizes among others. The poet Pierre Reverdy and the critic and propagandist for Cubism, Maurice Raynal, also wrote for the publication. The brightly coloured, art deco-inspired covers were designed by Georges Valmier, who also wrote for the journal and Rosenberg had begun to represent in 1920.

Although several of the leading Cubists defected from Léonce Rosenberg in the 1920s, some of them to his brother Paul, Léonce continued to represent a variety of modern artists including Giorgio de Chirico, József Csáky, Jean Metzinger, Léopold Survage, Francis Picabia and Fernand Léger. By 1927, however, Léger had also moved across to Paul Rosenberg.

In 1928 there were solo exhibitions for de Chirico, Jean Metzinger, and Georges Valmier. The exhibitions became more erratic after that, although Francis Picabia had two significant shows at L'Effort Moderne in 1930 and 1932.

== Business practices ==
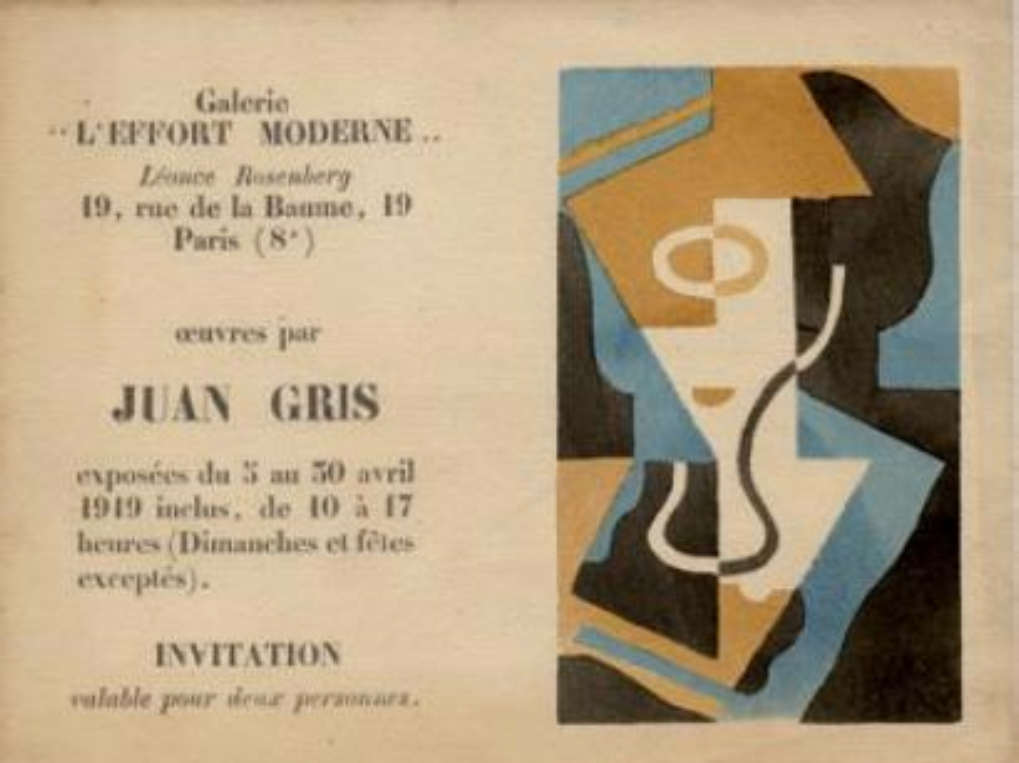
Juan Gris, invitation, galerie L'Effort Moderne, Léonce Rosenberg, April 1919

Joseph Csaky, Exhibition poster, Galerie l'Effort Moderne, Léonce Rosenberg, 1920

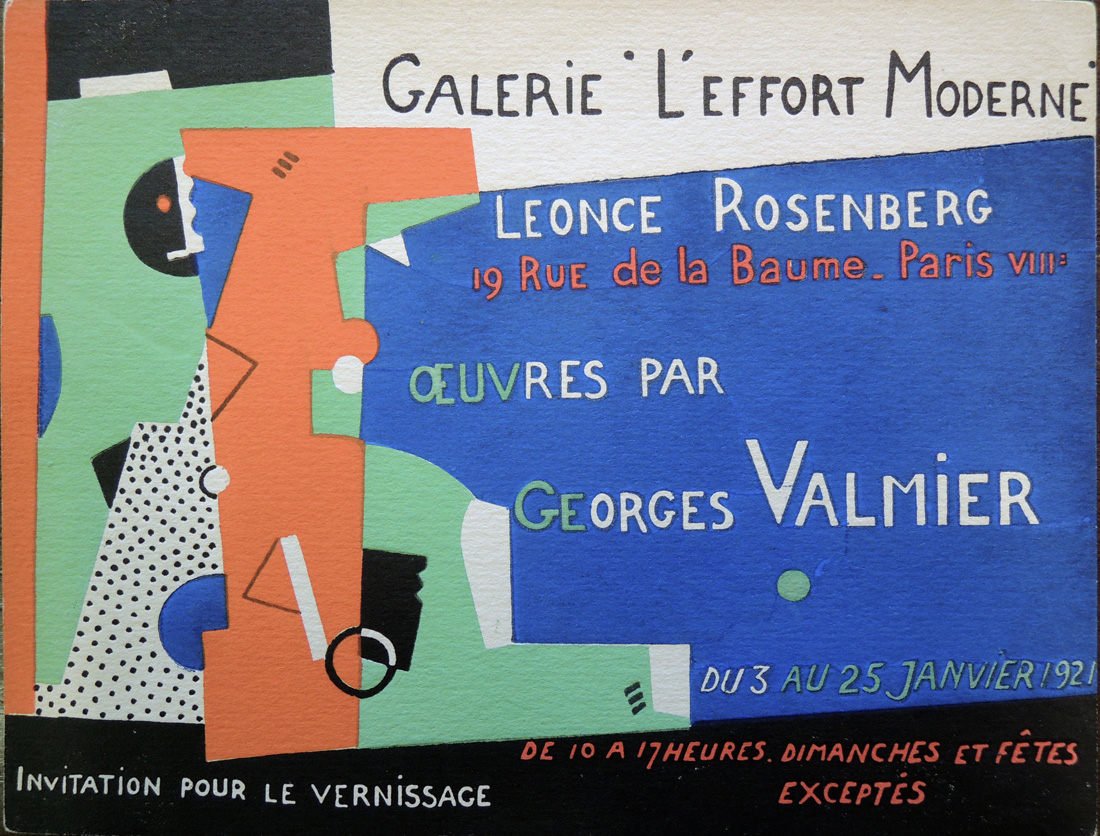
Invitation to the Georges Valmier exhibition at the Galerie de L'Effort Moderne, January 1921

Léonce Rosenberg was innovative, and occasionally somewhat unscrupulous, in his business practices. Rather than taking paintings from artists on a sale or return basis like most dealers, he insisted on buying the works outright. What he sold, he first owned. He also preferred to acquire only recent paintings, in order to maintain freshness and a greater control over prices. As his frequent correspondence with his artists reveals, Rosenberg liked to cast himself more in a role akin to that of an art patron of old than a conventional dealer. He saw himself as commissioning rather than simply buying and selling works. He suggested - some would say dictated - subject matter and themes, and at times even stipulated dimensions.

In the early years he demanded from his Cubists conceptual purity and a limited range of subjects suited to the rigours of Cubism. By 1925 he was encouraging Giorgio de Chirico, who had just joined L'Effort Moderne, away from his earlier metaphysical themes and towards the neoclassical style he was coming to represent. He requested more "antique subjects", "Gladiators...Horses with ruins". From the letters it appears this was driven as much by nakedly commercial as any aesthetic considerations. It was what the market wanted.

In a postscript to a letter to de Chirico in December 1926, he wrote: "Léger, Valmier, Metzinger, etc. before painting submit drawings or watercolours to me, because they are aware that their canvases are not destined for themselves but for third parties; it is important that subjects and formats be inspired by the tastes and needs of these others."

There was an ongoing tussle with de Chirico over the painter's habit of selling paintings directly from his studio and, in Rosenberg's view, undermining the "methodical, reasonable and honest progression of your prices" that he claimed to be striving towards. Rosenberg was also not afraid to reject works by his artists if he felt they did not meet the standards he expected.

In purchasing his artists' work outright, however, he also assumed greater financial risk. Strapped for funds, he was forced to auction off his collection several times in order to stay in business. The first of these sales took place in Amsterdam in 1921.

He had planned to launch the Bulletin de L'Effort Moderne as early as 1919 but for financial reasons was forced to delay it until 1924.

In return for promising artists some financial security, Rosenberg demanded certain levels of productivity. Along with the precise requirements for what he wanted in the paintings, it soon started to strain his relationship with at least some of his artists. Rivera was by 1918 already in open revolt. Gris grew increasingly frustrated, not only with Rosenberg's stipulations but also accusing him of somewhat more questionable practices. In November 1918 Gris wrote to Rosenberg: "I am not the one who can say whether my pictures are good or bad but what I can say without fear of contradiction is that they are definitely by me. However, the bizarre phenomenon exists that the GEM [Galerie L'Effort Moderne] pays as much or even more for fake Picassos, fake Braques and fake Gris as for genuine Gris.You understand my dear friend that this isn't calculated to encourage me in the purity of my work, and although I am not a money-grubber I cannot say I enjoy seeing myself become the Cinderella or the ragamuffin of the GEM."

The fallout from the auctions of the Kahnweiler/Uhde collections at the Hôtel Drouot was by no means the only reason for some of Léonce Rosenberg's artists to leave him.

Correspondence in the late 1920s with de Chrico, who had by then become one of the mainstays of the L'Effort Moderne, is equally instructive. Rosenberg's financial problems surfaced in a letter in January 1927: "Having examined the situation of my accounts with my bookkeeper...I ask that you take note of the fact that payment for any paintings I may buy may not be made until the end of each month, not during the month itself."

There is evidence of at least one rigged sale in 1928 in order to revive de Chirico's prices - incited by de Chirico himself, it has to be said - following an earlier disastrous auction at the Hôtel Drouot.

In the meantime Léonce's brother Paul - the more risk-averse and financially solid of the two - continued to pick up some of the artists for whom Léonce had worked hard to establish a solid reputation and market demand. Picasso had signed with Paul as early as 1918. Braque followed in 1922, Léger in 1927.

== Later life ==
In 1928 Léonce Rosenberg moved his personal collection to his apartment at 75 rue de Longchamps in Paris. Despite the financial crisis that had started building in France from 1926, eventually to spread globally in 1929, Rosenberg felt confident enough to commission a series of decorative panels for the apartment from artists including Giorgio de Chirico, Fernand Léger, Francis Picabia, Alberto Savinio, Gino Severini, Jean Metzinger, Auguste Herbin and Max Ernst. This grand, even megalomaniac, project reinforced Rosenberg's presentation of himself as a modern form of patron.

His optimism about the market in the face of the gathering financial storm was misplaced, however. L'Effort Moderne went bankrupt in 1931, with much of the stock auctioned off in London. By 1933 Rosenberg was forced to move to a smaller apartment, at 20 rue Spontini, and again in 1934 to 3 Square du Tarn. Two further auctions of works from Léonce Rosenberg's personal collection took place, following the one in Amsterdam in 1921, this time in 1932 at the Hôtel Drouot in Paris, scene of the infamous Kahnweiler/Uhde auctions 10 years earlier. In 1936 Rosenberg was forced to write to de Chirico, then in America, wondering whether the artist could help in selling there the panels he had painted for the rue de Longchamps apartment, even if at a price less than Rosenberg had originally paid de Chirico.

L'Effort Moderne continued as a hub for modern art in Paris through the 1930s, but it was never again as important, either commercially or as a catalyst in the history of painting, as it was for the second wave of Cubism in the years immediately after the Great War.

While World War I had provided the opportunity and impetus for the establishment of Galerie L'Effort Moderne, World War II brought about its end. As a Jewish-owned business, the gallery was forced to close in 1941 as a result of the Nazi occupation of France. Rosenberg went into hiding. Some of his property was seized or looted.

L'Effort Moderne never reopened, and Léonce Rosenberg died in July 1947 at Neuilly-sur-Seine.

== Legacy ==
Rosenberg is noted for having taken a risk by supporting the Cubists during and immediately after the Great War, when there was little interest in the movement. "Without him" noted Max Jacob, "a number of painters would be drivers or factory workers".

Having taken on many of Kahnweiler's clients, Rosenberg became for a time the most notable promoter of the Cubists. Ultimately, however, Léonce's brother Paul proved to be the more commercially successful. Having anticipated and prepared for the coming World War II by shipping much of his stock abroad, Paul Rosenberg was by 1940 ready to set up business in New York, where Rosenberg & Co. still trades.

Léonce Rosenberg corresponded frequently, during certain periods, daily, with his artists. This correspondence, along with business papers, gallery inventory records and the like, are now held in various public archives, including those of the Museum of Modern Art in New York and especially the Kandinsky Library at the Pompidou Centre in Paris. In addition to letters and papers, there are publication manuscripts, periodicals and photographic archives.

The photographs in the Pompidou Centre archive comprise mostly reproductions of works handled by L'Effort Moderne, including ones by Braque, Csaky, de Chirico, Gris, Herbin, Léger, Metzinger, Picasso and Valmier, along with views of hangings and events at the gallery. Further photographs attributed to Léonce Rosenberg are held in the Conway Library at the Courtauld Institute of Art in London and are being digitised as part of the Courtauld Connects project.

The letters in the Léonce Rosenberg collection at the Pompidou Centre, which only relatively recently, in the 1990s and 2000s, became available in a public archive and more accessible to historians. Comprising more than 800 letters and cards to Rosenberg from various artists and copies of more than 600 sent by him, the correspondence forms a diary-like collection, journaling his dealings through some of the most problematic years in the history of modern art. They are enabling art historians to reassess their view of some of the artists and of Rosenberg, and to start to explore some subjects in greater detail, such as the pressures exerted on artists and dealers by the economic situation between the two world wars.

== Selected exhibitions ==
- Auguste Herbin, 1 – 22 March 1918
- Henri Laurens, 5 – 31 December 1918
- Jean Metzinger, 6 – 31 January 1919
- Fernand Léger, 5 – 28 February 1919
- Georges Braque, 5 – 31 March 1919
- Juan Gris, 5 – 30 April 1919
- Gino Severini, 5 – 31 May 1919
- Pablo Picasso, 5 – 25 June 1919
- Drawings, Gouaches, watercolors, ? – 29 November 1919: Blanchard, Braque, Csaky, Gris, Hayden, Herbier, Lagut, Laurens, Léger, Lipchitz, Metzinger, Picasso, Severini
- Henri Hayden, 4 – 24 December 1919
- Jean Metzinger, 2 – 22 January 1920
- Jacques Lipchitz, 26 January – 14 February 1920
- Juan Gris, 12 March – 2 April 1920
- Les Maîtres du Cubisme: Georges Braque, Juan Gris, Auguste Herbin, Henri Laurens, Fernand Léger, Jean Metzinger, Pablo Picasso, Gino Severini. Exhibition 3 May – 30 October 1920
- Léopold Survage, 2 – 25 November 1920
- Joseph Csaky, 1 – 25 December 1920
- Georges Valmier, 3 – 25 January 1921
- Auguste Herbin, 5 – 31 March 1921
- Maîtres du Cubisme: Piet Mondrian, Albert Gleizes, Fernand Léger, Georges Braque, Juan Gris, Auguste Herbin, Jean Metzinger, Amédée Ozenfant, Pablo Picasso, Henri Laurens, Joseph Csáky and Gino Severini. May 1921
- Du cubisme à une renaissance plastique: Braque, Gleizes, Gris, Hayden, Herbin, Léger, Metzinger, Mondrian, Ozenfant, Picasso and Valmier, 1922
- Dessins et aquarelles des cubistes: 3 – 25 January 1923
- De Stijl, 1923, 1924
- Jean Metzinger, 17 – 27 June 1925
- Jean Metzinger, 16 April – 10 May 1928
- Francis Picabia, Trente ans de Peinture, 9 – 31 December 1930
- Francis Picabia (drawings), December 1932

== Works ==
Jean Metzinger, April 1916, Femme au miroir (Lady at her Dressing Table), oil on canvas, 92.4 x 65.1 cm, private collection

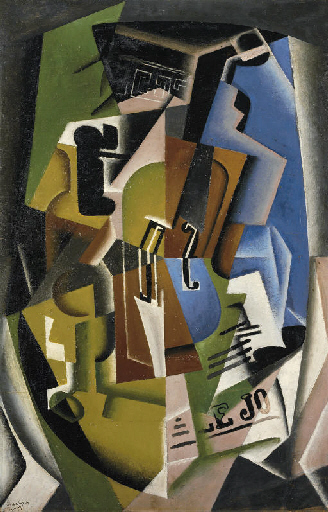
Juan Gris, 1917, Violon et journal, oil on panel, 92.3 × 60.3 cm. Galerie l'Effort Moderne, no. 5122

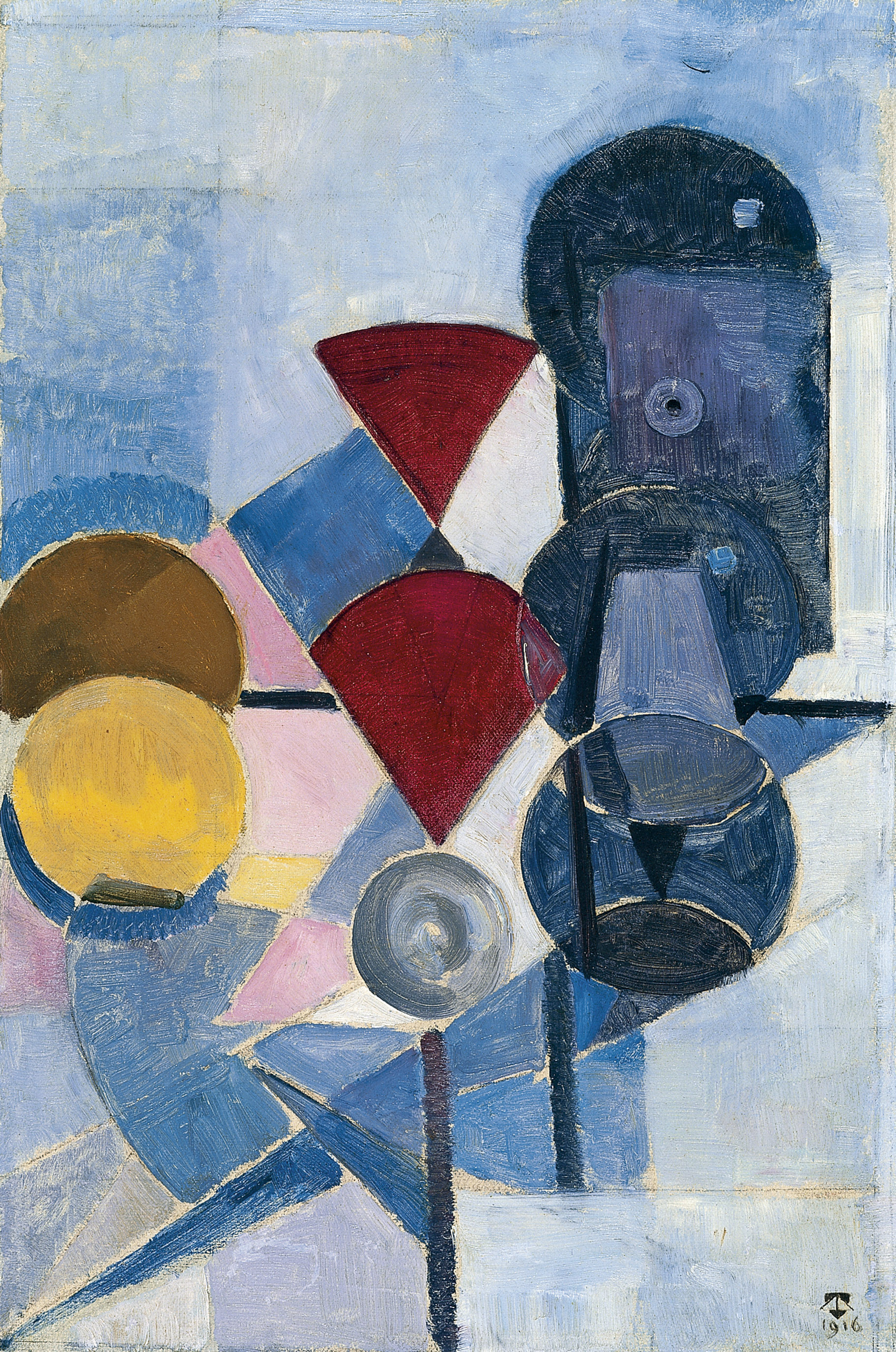
Theo van Doesburg, 1916, Composition II (Still Life), oil on canvas, 45 x 32 cm. Classique-Baroque-Moderne, Anvers: De Sikkel, Paris 1921: Léonce Rosenberg, [p. 35], as Nature morte.

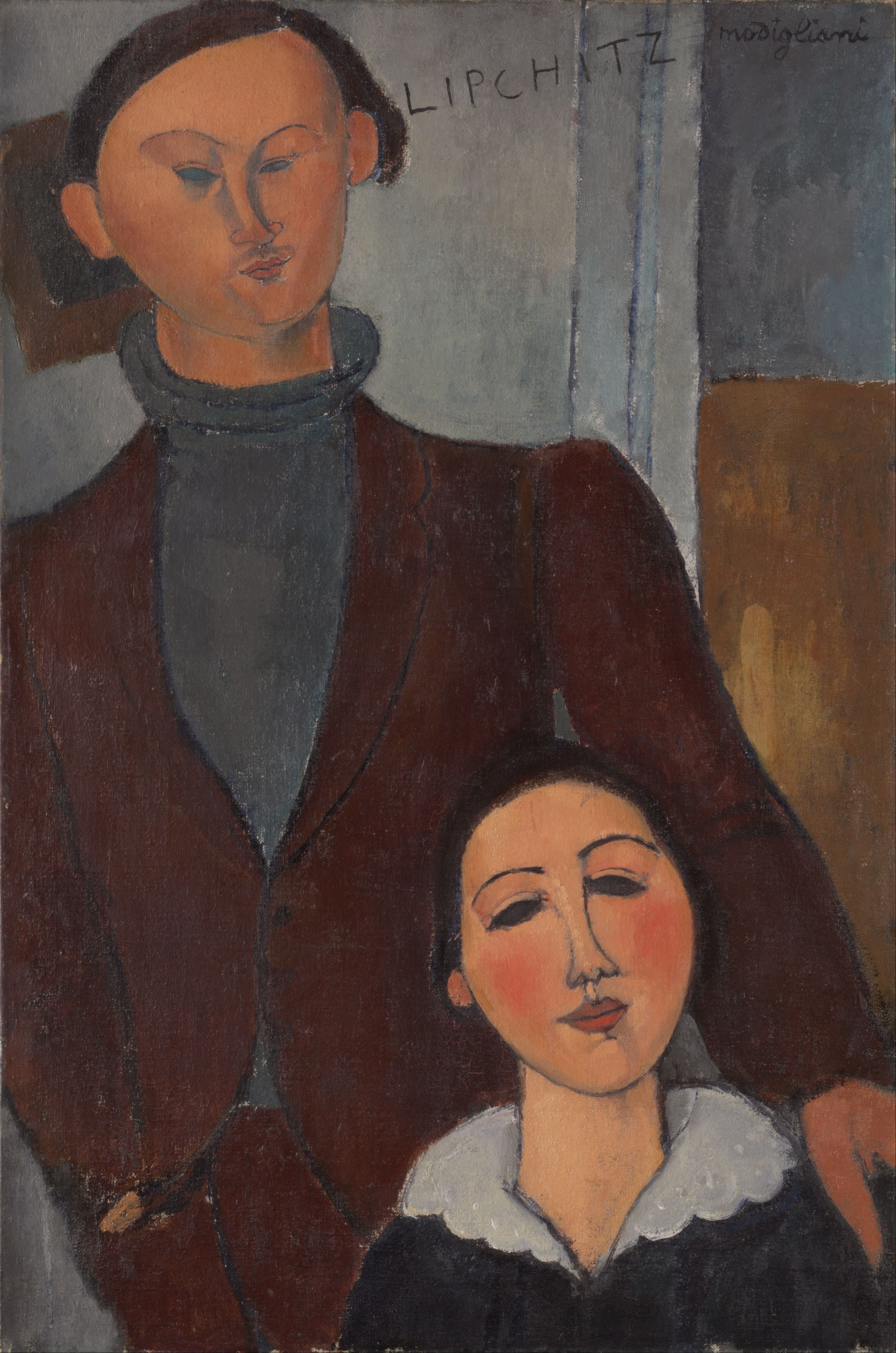
Amedeo Modigliani, 1916, Jacques and Berthe Lipchitz, oil on canvas, 81.3 x 54.3 cm. Jacques Lipchitz, Paris, acquired directly from the artist, 1916-c. 1921, by exchange to Léonce Rosenberg, Paris, c. 1921–1922

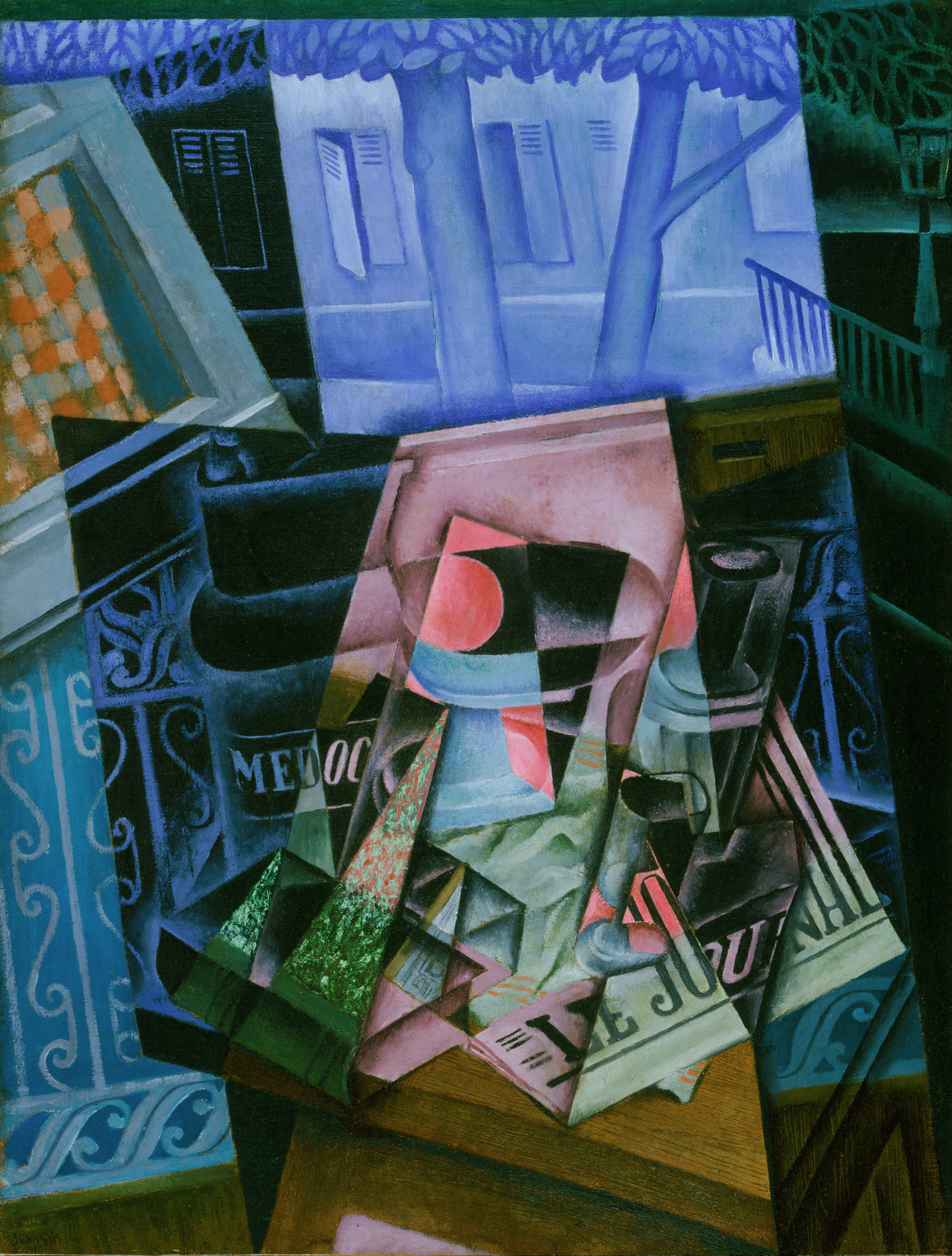
Juan Gris, 1915, Still Life before an Open Window, Place Ravignan, oil on canvas, 115.9 x 88.9 cm, Philadelphia Museum of Art. Formerly owned by Pierre Faure whose large collection of 26 paintings by Gris were purchased from Léonce Rosenberg between 1915 and 1927

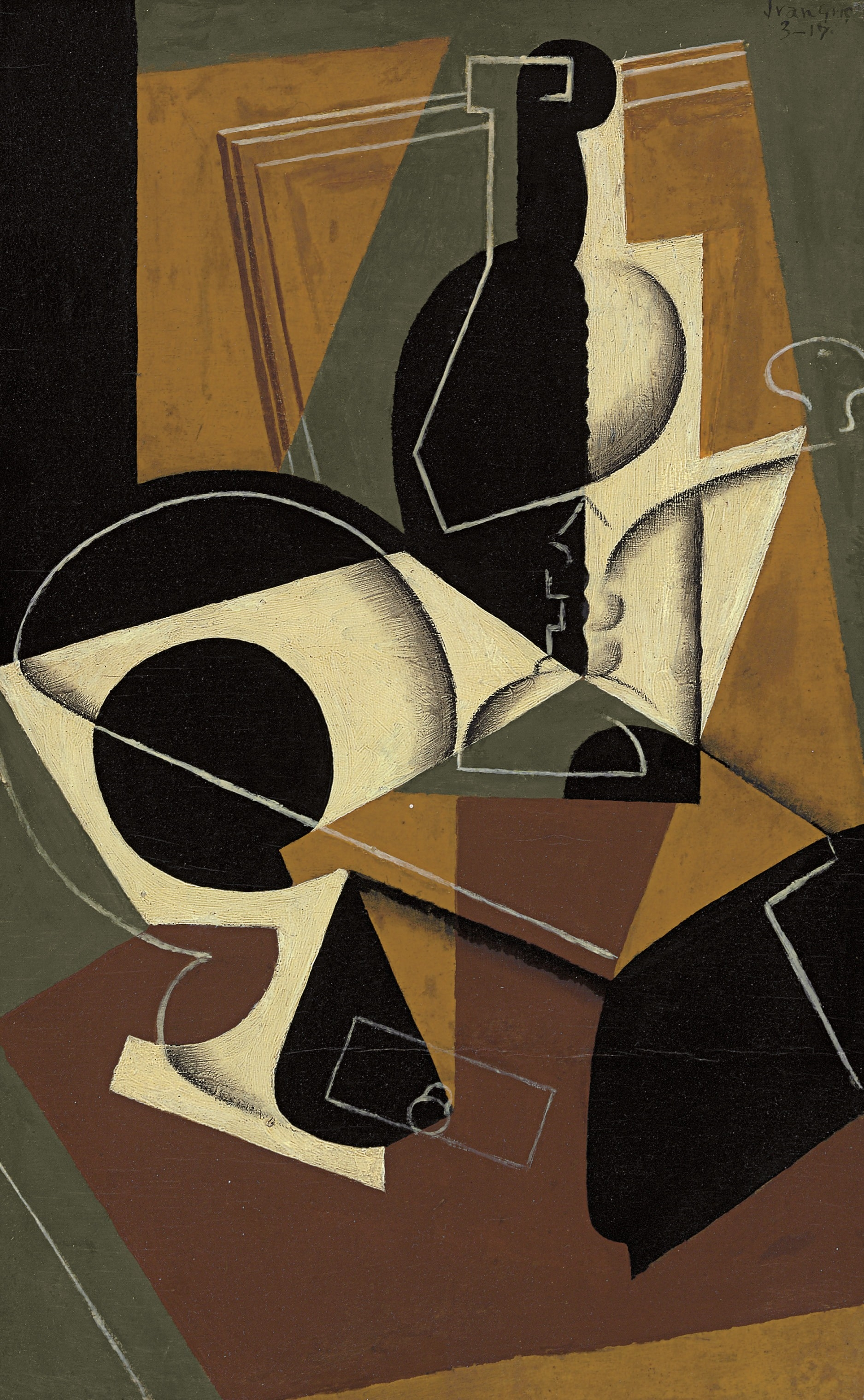
Juan Gris, 1917, Moulin à café et bouteille, oil on cardboard mounted on panel, 60.8 x 37.7 cm. Provenance: Léonce Rosenberg, Paris

Joseph Csaky, Deux figures, 1920, relief, limestone, polychrome, 80 cm, Kröller-Müller Museum, Otterlo, Netherlands. Provenance: Léonce Rosenberg, Paris

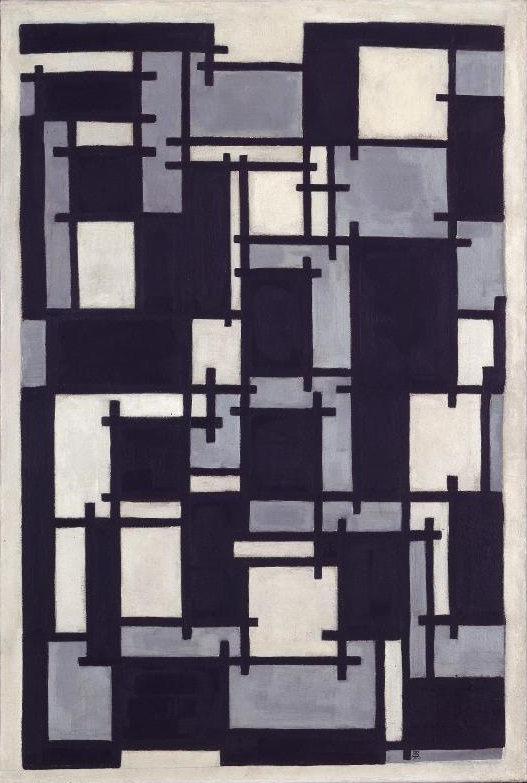
Theo van Doesburg, 1918, Compositie X, oil on canvas, 64 x 43 cm, Musée National d'Art Moderne, Paris. Theo van Doesburg (1921) Classique-Baroque-Moderne, Anvers: De Sikkel, Paris: Léonce Rosenberg

Gino Severini, 1919, Bohémien Jouant de L'Accordéon (The Accordion Player), Museo del Novecento, Milan

== See also ==
- Crystal Cubism
- Cubism
- Abstract art
- De Stijl
- Purism
- Modern art
