= Nightclub Hostess =

1940 film

- Directed by: Albert Valentin
- Written by: Charles Spaak
- Produced by: Raoul Ploquin
- Starring: Michèle Morgan
- Cinematography: Günther Rittau
- Music by: Georges Van Parys
- Production companies: Les Films Raoul Ploquin; Universum Film (UFA)
- Distributed by: L'Alliance Cinématographique Européenne (ACE)
- Release date: 11 January 1940
- Running time: 95 min
- Countries: France; Germany
- Language: French

Nightclub Hostess (French title: L'Entraîneuse) is a 1940 French language motion picture drama directed by Albert Valentin. The screenplay was written by Charles Spaak. The film stars Michèle Morgan, Gilbert Gil, Gisèle Préville, Jeanne Lion and Fréhel.

It tells the story of a hostess/call-girl who falls in love with a rich friend, whose father had tried to pick her up at the club.

== Cast ==
- Michèle Morgan as Suzy
- Gilbert Gil as Pierre Noblet
- Andrex as Marcel
- Gisèle Préville as Lucienne Noblet
- Arthur Devère as Raymond, le domestique
- Georges Lannes as Philippe de Lormel
- Catherine Fonteney as Madame de Saint-Leu
- Jeanne Lion as Tante Louise
- René Génin as Le vieux professeur
- François Périer as Jean
- Jimmy Gaillard as André
- Monique Joyce as Florence
- Fréhel as La chanteuse
- Félicien Tramel as Monsieur Noblet
