= Fréhel =

French singer and actress (1891–1951)

Fréhel

Fréhel (French: [fʁe.ɛl]; born Marguerite Boulc'h (Breton: [bulx]); 13 July 1891 – 3 February 1951) was a French singer and actress.

== Biography ==
Born in Paris to a poor and dysfunctional Breton family, Marguerite Boulc'h was a child left to a life on the streets in the sordid side of Paris. In her teens, she got a break when she met one of the female music-hall performers who heard her sing and introduced her to show business promoters.

She began performing under the stage name Pervenche, and soon met and married Robert Hollard, a performer who used the nom de guerre "Roberty". Alcohol entered her life at an early age and her drinking became a problem for her husband. Their marriage did not last long and her husband left her for another Parisian singer, Damia. Fréhel then began a relationship with Maurice Chevalier but that too did not last long and after he left her for the much older megastar Mistinguett. At 19 years old, she attempted suicide.

Following her suicide attempt, in 1913 she tried to escape her pain and travelled to Bucharest, Turkey and then to Russia where she remained for more than ten years. She suffered from alcoholism and drug addiction, and returned to Paris in 1922. She then signaled a new beginning by switching to the stage name "Fréhel", taking the name from Cap Fréhel in Brittany where her parents had been born. Singing as Fréhel, at the Paris Olympia in 1924 she gave a powerful performance and was soon headlining at the most popular venues in the country. As part of what is now referred to as the bal musette, Fréhel often sang accompanied by bagpipes and/or an accordion player.

In the 1930s, she appeared in several motion pictures, almost always portraying a singer in a minor or supporting role. The most notable films in which she performed were 1931's Cœur de Lilas, based on the Tristan Bernard play, and Pépé le Moko that starred Jean Gabin. While her alcohol abuse continued, she nevertheless was a major show business force of 1930s France. Of all her songs, her 1939 La Java Bleue, with music by Vincent Scotto, proved her most popular.

Despite being one of Europe's most sought-after performers, her addictions led her to drop out of public view for years. She died in 1951, alone in a hotel in Pigalle. She was interred in the Cimetière de Pantin, near Paris.

Her 1934 recording Si tu n'étais pas là was featured in the 2001 soundtrack of the film Le Fabuleux Destin d'Amélie Poulain (Amélie).

She is portrayed by Yolande Moreau in the Gainsbourg bio pic Gainsbourg: A Heroic Life - in which she encounters the young Serge Gainsbourg and accompanies him in a song.

== Songs ==
- Comme un moineau (1925)
- Où est-il donc? (1926)
- À la dérive (1932)
- Si tu n'étais pas là (1934)
- Où sont tous mes amants (1935)
- Tel qu'il est (1936)
- La Der des der (1939)
- La Java bleue (1939)

== Selected filmography ==
- Lilac (1932)
- Street Without a Name (1934)
- Le Roman d'un tricheur (Confessions of a Cheat) (1936)
- Pépé le Moko (1937)
- The Innocent (1938)
- La Rue sans joie (1938)
- Sirocco (1938)
- Berlingot et compagnie (Berlingot and Company) (1939)
- L'Entraîneuse (Nightclub Hostess) (1940)
- Maya (1949)
- A Man Walks in the City (1950)
