= Miss Bonaparte =

1942 film

- Directed by: Maurice Tourneur
- Written by: Gérard Bourgeois (novel); Pierre Chanlain (novel); André Legrand
- Produced by: Alfred Greven
- Starring: Edwige Feuillère; Monique Joyce; Raymond Rouleau
- Cinematography: Jules Kruger
- Edited by: Christian Gaudin
- Music by: Henri Verdun
- Production company: Continental Films
- Distributed by: Films Sonores Tobis
- Release date: 16 January 1942
- Running time: 100 minutes
- Country: France
- Language: French

Miss Bonaparte (French: Mam'zelle Bonaparte) is a 1942 French historical drama film directed by Maurice Tourneur and starring Edwige Feuillère, Monique Joyce and Raymond Rouleau. It is based on a novel by Gérard Bourgeois and Pierre Chanlain, set during the reign of Napoleon III. The film was made during the German occupation of France.

The film's sets were designed by the art director Guy de Gastyne.

== Cast ==
- Edwige Feuillère as Cora Pearl
- Monique Joyce as Lucy de Kaula
- Raymond Rouleau as Philippe de Vaudrey
- Guillaume de Sax as Le prince Jérôme Bonaparte
- Simone Renant as Adèle Rémy
- Marguerite Pierry as La Blandin
- Nina Sinclair as Augustine
- Aimé Clariond as Le duc de Morny
- Roland Armontel as Arsène
- Noël Roquevert as Criscelli
- Jacques Maury as Le comte de Brimont
- Camille Bert as Le gouverneur du fort
- Elmire Vautier as Mademoiselle Hortense
- André Carnège as Alexandre Dumas

== Bibliography ==
- Waldman, Harry. Maurice Tourneur: The Life and Films. McFarland & Co, 2008.
