= Criminal Brigade (1947 film) =

1947 film

- Directed by: Gilbert Gil
- Written by: Gil Verdie
- Produced by: Jacques Moreau
- Starring: Gilbert Gil; Gisèle Préville; Maurice Teynac
- Cinematography: Jean Bachelet
- Edited by: J. Ginet
- Music by: Jacques Dupont
- Production company: Compagnie Française de Distribution de Films
- Distributed by: Compagnie Française de Distribution de Films
- Release date: 5 September 1947
- Running time: 82 minutes
- Country: France
- Language: French

Criminal Brigade (French: Brigade criminelle) is a 1947 French thriller film directed by and starring Gilbert Gil. The cast also included Gisèle Préville, Jean Davy and Maurice Teynac. It was made at the Photosonor Studios in Courbevoie on the outskirts of Paris. The film's set were designed by the art director Nordès Bartau.

== Synopsis ==
Enemy agents attempt to gain control of information about a secret defence system. Commissioner Chabrier attempts to stop them before they can pass the information to their embassy.

== Cast ==
- Jean-Louis Allibert as Inspecteur
- Ellen Bernsen as Myriam
- Michel Bouquet as Le tueur
- Raymond Cordy as Mérignac
- Jean Davy as Commissaire Chabrier
- Jacques Dufilho as Lucien
- Gilbert Gil as Michel Perrin
- Daniel Ivernel as Jean-Jacques
- Jean-Max as Oudrach
- Gaëtan Jor as Inspecteur
- Gisèle Préville as Christine
- Maurice Teynac as Fred

== Bibliography ==
- Dayna Oscherwitz & MaryEllen Higgins. The A to Z of French Cinema. Scarecrow Press, 2009.
