= Night in December =

1940 film

- Directed by: Curtis Bernhardt
- Written by: Bernhard Kellermann (novel); Lilo Dammert; Hans Jacoby; André Legrand; Bernard Zimmer
- Produced by: Gregor Rabinovitch; Robert Woog
- Starring: Pierre Blanchar; Renée Saint-Cyr; Gilbert Gil
- Cinematography: Jean Isnard
- Edited by: Myriam Borsoutsky
- Music by: Marcel Delannoy
- Production company: Films Metzger et Woog
- Distributed by: Ciné-Alliance
- Release date: 9 February 1940
- Running time: 82 minutes
- Country: France
- Language: French

Night in December (French: Nuit de décembre) is a 1940 French drama film directed by Curtis Bernhardt and starring Pierre Blanchar, Renée Saint-Cyr and Gilbert Gil. It was shot at the Billancourt Studios in Paris. The film's sets were designed by the art directors Henri Ménessier and Jean d'Eaubonne. It was Bernhardt's last French film before he left the country for America. It was given a re-release by DisCina in 1949.

== Synopsis ==
In 1919 Pierre Darmont a virtuoso pianist meets Anne Morris, and falls in love. Then after one night, she inexplicably disappears. Twenty years later, now a celebrated name, he encounters a woman who seems to resemble his long-lost lover very closely.

== Cast ==
- Pierre Blanchar as Pierre Darmont
- Renée Saint-Cyr as Anne Morris / Helen Morris
- Gilbert Gil as Jacques Morel
- Jean Tissier as Camille
- Marcel André as James Arthur Morris
- Eugène Stuber as Le porteur
- Pearl Argyle as Betty, la jeune ballerine
- Bernard Blier as Edouard
- Marcel Delannoy as Le chef d'orchestre en 1919
- Dora Doll as Une fille de la bande
- Georges Flateau as Le maître d'hôtel
- Gustave Gallet as Le médecin au concert de 1939
- Anthony Gildès as Le concierge du Conservatoire
- Maurice Jaubert as Le chef d'orchestre en 1939
- Maurice Nasil as Le représentant
- Jean Parédès as Un figurant
- Marcel Pérès as Le chauffeur du prince
- Serge Reggiani as Un figurant
- Jacques Simonot as Un copain
- Monique Thibaut as Une figurante

== Bibliography ==
- Crisp, Colin. French Cinema—A Critical Filmography: Volume 1, 1929–1939. Indiana University Press, 2015.
