= Monique Joyce =

French actress (1912–1994)

- Born: 22 December 1912; Paris, France
- Died: 26 September 1994 (aged 81); Vaucresson, France
- Other name: Thérèse Mathilde Bénard
- Occupation: Actress
- Years active: 1933–1943 (film)

Monique Joyce (1912–1994) was a French model, singer and actress. She began her career appearing in the Opéra comique. After winning the Mademoiselle Paris contest in March 1933, she received greater public attention and made her first film appearance that year.

During the Occupation of France she appeared in several productions by the German-backed Continental Films that later resulted in charges of collaboration against her. Her final role was a supporting part in the 1943 film Late Love directed by Gustav Ucicky and made in Vienna. Following the Liberation of Paris in 1944, she headed to the Sigmaringen enclave where the Vichy government in exile was based for the final months of the war.

== Selected filmography ==
- Ciboulette (1933)
- Criminal (1933)
- The Courier of Lyon (1937)
- Mother Love (1938)
- Nightclub Hostess (1940)
- Sins of Youth (1941)
- Twisted Mistress (1942)
- Miss Bonaparte (1942)
- Late Love (1943)

== Bibliography ==
- Burch, Noël & Sellier, Geneviève. The Battle of the Sexes in French Cinema, 1930–1956. Duke University Press, 2013.
- Waldman, Harry. Maurice Tourneur: The Life and Films. McFarland, 2001.
