= Eternal Conflict =

1948 film

- Directed by: Georges Lampin
- Written by: Jean Ferry; Charles Spaak
- Produced by: Jacques Roitfeld
- Starring: Annabella; Fernand Ledoux; Michel Auclair
- Cinematography: Christian Matras
- Edited by: Borys Lewin
- Music by: Maurice Thiriet
- Production companies: Francinex; Les Productions Jacques Roitfeld
- Distributed by: Francinex
- Release date: 26 May 1948
- Running time: 95 minutes
- Country: France
- Language: French

Eternal Conflict (French: Éternel conflit) is a 1948 French drama film directed by Georges Lampin and starring Annabella, Fernand Ledoux and Michel Auclair.

The film's sets were designed by the art director Léon Barsacq.

== Synopsis ==
A disillusioned teacher gives up his job and joins a circus, where he befriends a beautiful acrobat with a complex love life.

== Cast ==
- Fernand Ledoux as Le professeur Janvier
- Annabella as Florence dite Lili
- Michel Auclair as Mario
- Louis Salou as Chardeuil
- Line Noro as Germaine - femme de Janvier
- Mary Morgan as Mme Chardeuil
- Jeannette Batti as Janette
- Jeanne Lion as Mémé
- Colette Ripert as Mlle Chardeuil
- Monique Arthur as La bonne
- Gaston Modot as Le bonimenteur
- Roland Armontel as Robert Ariani
- Marcel André as Le proviseur
- Guy Favières as L'inspecteur
- Marcel Melrac as Un garçon de piste
- Paul Delon as Le directeur
- Philippe Lemaire as Chardeuil fils
- Julien Maffre as Un garçon de piste
- Albert Malbert as Le patron du café

== Bibliography ==
- Jonathan Driskell. The French Screen Goddess: Film Stardom and the Modern Woman in 1930s France. I.B.Tauris, 2015.
