= Une femme libre =

1934 French play by Armand Salacrou

Une femme libre (a free woman) is a three-act Theatre play by French dramatist Armand Salacrou premiered on 4 October 1934 at the Théâtre de l'Œuvre.

== Théâtre Saint-Georges, 1949 ==
- Direction: Jacques Dumesnil
- Characters and comedians :
  - Lucie Blondel : Sophie Desmarets
  - Aunt Adrienne : Jeanne Lion
  - Célestine : Germaine Engel
  - Paul Miremont : Jacques Dumesnil
  - Jacques Miremont : Yves Robert
  - Cher Ami : Claude Nicot
  - Max : Jean-Claude Michel
  - Un encaisseur du gaz : Pierre Regy
  - A young man : Robert Durran
