= Henri Hayden =

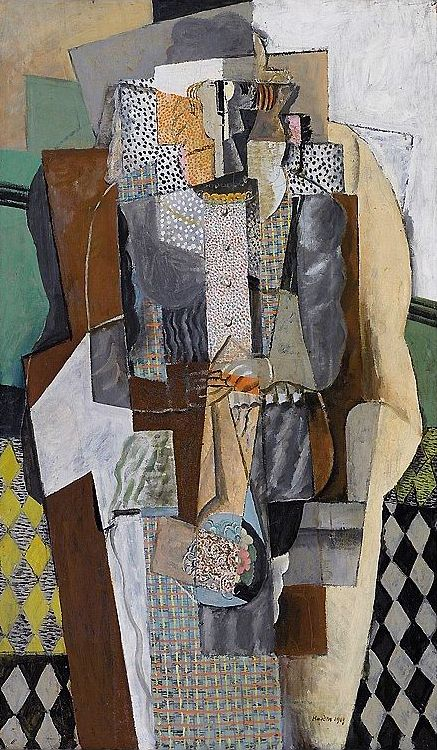
Fille assise au bouquet de fleurs, 1919

Henri Hayden, born Henryk Hayden (December 24, 1883 – May 12, 1970), was a Polish painter. Born in Warsaw, Hayden lived and worked in Paris. Hayden studied engineering at the Warsaw Polytechnic from 1902 to 1905, while simultaneously pursuing studies at the Warsaw Academy of Fine Arts and eventually moved to France in 1907.

In Paris, he became acquainted with the artists associated with the École de Paris and later raised to prominence as a Cubist painter. Hayden said that "I only absorbed Cubism in 1915, after having swallowed and digested all of French painting in a few years. This rapid absorption led me, in a spirit of creative synthesis, without even realising, to Picasso and Braque's experimentation at the time." His first exhibition took place at the Galerie Druet in 1911. One of Hayden's first dealers was Leonce Rosenberg, who organised an exhibition of his works in 1919.

== Collections ==
Hayden's works are held in several major museum collections worldwide, including the Tate Modern in London, The Museum of Modern Art in New York, The Carnegie Museum of Art in Pittsburgh, Centre Pompidou in Paris.

== Art market ==
Hayden's most expensive work to date, a group portrait painting titled Les joueurs d'échecs from 1913, sold in 2020 at Christie's London for GBP1.2 million.
