= Mother Love (1938 film) =

1938 film

- Directed by: Jean Boyer
- Written by: Jean Boyer
- Based on: Mother Love by André Birabeau
- Produced by: Robert Aisner
- Starring: Michel Simon; Arletty; Gabrielle Dorziat
- Cinematography: Victor Arménise
- Edited by: André Versein
- Music by: Georges Van Parys
- Production company: Héraut Film
- Distributed by: Compagnie Universelle Cinématographique
- Release date: 3 November 1938
- Running time: 85 minutes
- Country: France
- Language: French

Mother Love (French: La chaleur du sein) is a 1938 French comedy drama film directed by Jean Boyer and starring Michel Simon, Arletty and Gabrielle Dorziat. It was based on a play by André Birabeau.

It was shot at Pathe's Francoeur Studios in Paris. The film's sets were designed by the art director Jacques Colombier.

== Synopsis ==
The eighteen-year-old son of a celebrated, widowed archaeologist attempts to commit suicide while his father is away on an expedition in Egypt due to being spurned by a cabaret performer. His three prospective stepmothers all gather at his bedside, each demonstrating a possessive attitude.

== Cast ==
- Michel Simon as Michel Quercy
- Arletty as Bernadette Mezin
- Gabrielle Dorziat as Adrienne
- Pierre Larquey as Raoul Dalaciaud - le patron de Gilbert
- Jean Pâqui as Gilbert Quercy
- Jeanne Lion as Mathilde
- Jane Loury as Augustine
- Monique Joyce as Joan Bouvreuil
- Gisèle Préville as La jeune fille
- Andrée Prévot as La jolie passagère
- Henri Vilbert as Le barman du paquebot
- François Périer as Batilly
- Marguerite Moreno as L'Américaine sur le paquebot

== Bibliography ==
- Dayna Oscherwitz & MaryEllen Higgins. The A to Z of French Cinema. Scarecrow Press, 2009.
