= Gisèle Préville =

French actress (1918–2006)

- Born: 11 December 1918; Paris, Ile-de-France, France
- Died: 26 November 2006 (aged 87); Villiers-le-Bel, Val d'Oise, France
- Occupation: Actress
- Years active: 1936-1987 (film)

Gisèle Préville (1918–2006) was a French film actress and beauty contestant. She entered the film industry after being crowned Miss Paris in 1934 and Miss France in 1935. While she mainly featured in French films, she also starred in the British films Against the Wind (1948) and The Dancing Years (1950).

== Partial filmography ==
- Adventure in Paris (1936) - Solange Surnisse
- Beethoven's Great Love (1936) - (uncredited)
- White Cargo (1937) - Béatrice Blanco
- Trois artilleurs au pensionnat (1937)
- Prison sans barreaux (1938) - Alice
- Trois artilleurs en vadrouille (1938) - Monique Chabert
- Mother Love (1938) - La jeune fille
- Cocoanut (1939) - Nathalie
- Nightclub Hostess (1939) - Lucienne Noblet
- Paris-New York (1940) - Jane Billingham
- Melody for You (1942) - Irène Daniel
- Two Timid Souls (1943) - Cécile Vancouver
- Vautrin (1943) - Madame de Maufrigneuse
- Trente et quarante (1946) - Aurélia
- The Adventures of Casanova (1947) - Esther Van Hope
- Counter Investigation (1947) - Odette Marchal
- Mirror (1947) - Anna Lussac
- Criminal Brigade (1947) - Christine
- Against the Wind (1948) - Julie
- Return to Life (1949) - Lilian (segment 2 : "Le retour d'Antoine")
- The Dancing Years (1950) - Maria Zeidler
- The Turkey (1951) - Maguy Pacarel
- Les mousquetaires du roi (1951)
- It Happened All Night (1960) - Madame Lenormand
- The President (1961)
- Five Miles to Midnight (1962) - Mrs. Harrington
- A Time for Loving (1972) - Amie Isadore (uncredited)
- The Witness (1978) - Louise Maurisson
- Docteur Jekyll et les femmes (1981) - Dr. Jekyll's mother
- Nuit docile (1987) - L'amie de Simone Dubois (final film role)

== Bibliography ==
- Hayward, Susan. Simone Signoret: The Star as Cultural Sign. Continuum, 2004.
