= Gilbert Gil =

French actor

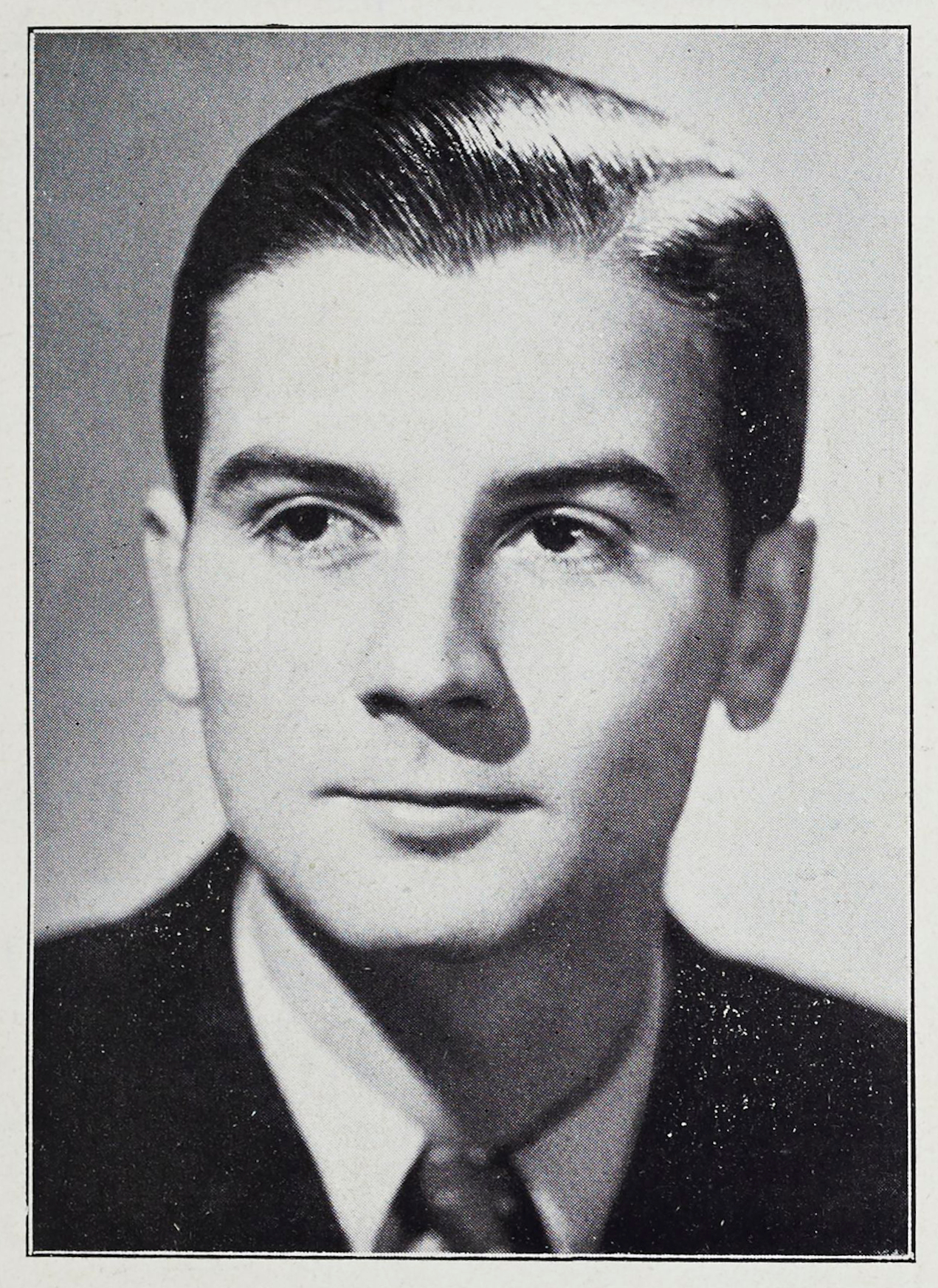
- Born: 9 September 1913; Goussainville, Val-d'Oise, France
- Died: August 25, 1988 (aged 74); Maisons-Laffitte, Yvelines, France
- Other name: Gilbert Moreau
- Occupation: Actor
- Years active: 1936 - 1969 (film)

Gilbert Gil (September 9, 1913 – August 25, 1988) was a French film actor. He also directed a single film Criminal Brigade in 1947.

== Partial filmography ==
- Mayerling (1936) - Un étudiant (uncredited)
- Les grands (1936) - Surot
- Forty Little Mothers (1936) - Robert Bourgeon, le fils
- Girls of Paris (1936) - Georges Levaut
- Culprit (1937) - Jérôme Forgeat
- Pépé le Moko (1937) - Pierrot
- Une femme sans importance (1937) - Gerald
- Le cantinier de la coloniale (1937)
- Gribouille (1937) - Claude Morestan
- Abused Confidence (1937) - Paul
- Le chanteur de minuit (1937) - René
- La Glu (1938) - Marie-Pierre
- The Woman Thief (1938) - Pierrot (French version)
- Cocoanut (1939) - Antoine
- Nightclub Hostess (1939) - Pierre Noblet
- Night in December (1940) - Jacques Morel
- Sarajevo (1940) - Prinzip (uncredited)
- Portrait of Innocence (1941) - Monsieur Morin, l'instituteur
- Foolish Husbands (1941) - Achille Ballorson
- The Golden Age (1942) - Henri Dubélair
- La Symphonie fantastique (1942) - Louis Berlioz
- The Law of Spring (1942) - Hubert Villaret
- The Murderer is Afraid at Night (1942) - Gilbert
- Monsieur La Souris (1942) - Christian Osting
- Haut le vent (1942) - Joachim
- Secrets (1943) - Michel Aylias
- Pierre and Jean (1943) - Pierre Roland
- The Last Penny (1946) - Pierre Durban
- Lessons in Conduct (1946) - Jacques
- On demande un ménage (1946) - Pierre Larrieu
- Monsieur de Falindor (1947) - Maître Basilius
- Criminal Brigade (1947) - Michel Perrin
- The Eleven O'Clock Woman (1948) - Charles Pescara
- The Murdered Model (1948) - Armand
- Born of Unknown Father (1950) - Raymond Denis
- Les mousquetaires du roi (1951)
- Royal Affairs in Versailles (1954) - Jean-Jacques Rousseau
- Napoléon (1955) - Louis Bonaparte (uncredited)
- Madelon (1955) - Un commandant d'aviation chez Maxim's
- If Paris Were Told to Us (1956) - Molière
- If All the Guys in the World (1956) - L'employé de la Gare des Invalides (uncredited)
- Ça n'arrive qu'aux vivants (1959) - Marc Mattéï
- Jugez-les bien (1961) - Litry
- Two Are Guilty (1963) - L'inspecteur Portal
- Don't Tempt the Devil (1963) - Garat, un journaliste
- Le temps des copains (1963)
- L'assassin viendra ce soir (1964) - Paul Roubais

== Bibliography ==
- Dayna Oscherwitz & MaryEllen Higgins. The A to Z of French Cinema. Scarecrow Press, 2009.
