= Alfréd Réth =

Hungarian painter

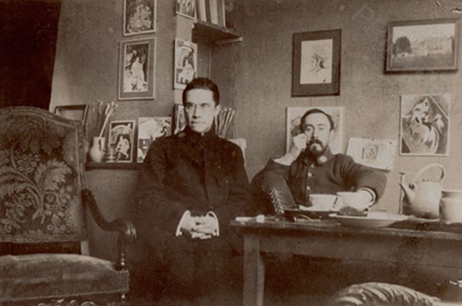
- Maurice Esmein and Alfréd Réth
- Born: Alfréd Réth; 1884; Budapest
- Died: 1966 (aged 81–82); Paris
- Movement: Cubism

Alfréd Réth (1884–1966) was a Hungarian painter. He was born in Budapest. At the age of 19 he left for Italy, then in 1905 to Paris. Here he discovered the art of Cézanne and Hindu art. He became a member of the cubist movement.
