= Armand Salacrou =

French dramatist (1899–1989)

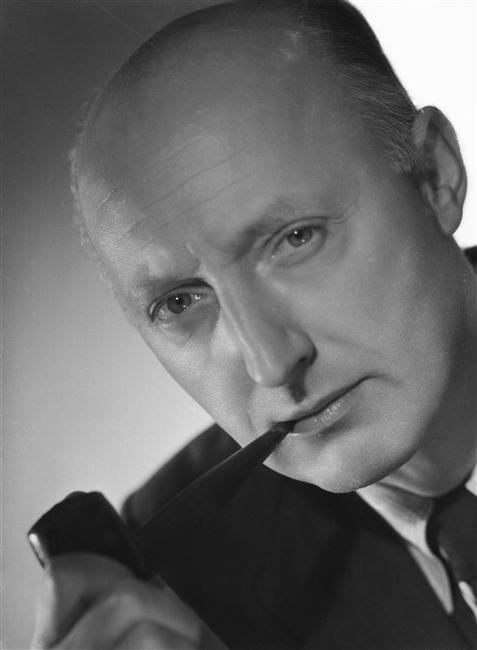
- Born: 9 August 1899; Rouen, France
- Died: 23 November 1989 (aged 90); Le Havre, France
- Occupation: Dramatist

Armand Camille Salacrou (French pronunciation: [aʁmɑ̃ kamij salakʁu]; 9 August 1899 – 23 November 1989) was a French dramatist.

== Biography ==
He was born in Rouen, but spent most of his childhood at Le Havre, and moved to Paris in 1917. His first works show the influence of the Surrealists.

He was the owner of a profitable advertising firm, but sold it in order to devote his time to writing plays. Encouraged by Charles Dullin, he wrote in a wide range of styles and enjoyed great success from the mid-1930s. His later work is usually grouped with that of the Existentialists. He flirted with communism during the 1920s and criticized capitalism in his play Boulevard Durand. During the Nazi occupation of France, he participated in the clandestine French Resistance, an experience which he celebrated in Les Nuits de la colère.

He was a member of the Académie Goncourt, and a library in his home town is named after him.

== Plays ==
- 1923 : Magasin d'accessoires, Histoire de cirque, Le Casseur d'assiettes, Les Trente Tombes de Judas
- 1924 : La Boule de Verre
- 1925 : Le Pont de l'Europe
- 1925 : Tour à terre
- 1927 : Patchouli, ou Les Désordres de l'amour
- 1929 : Atlas-Hôtel, Les Frénétiques
- 1931 : La Vie en Rose
- 1933 : Une femme libre, Poof
- 1935 : L'Inconnue d'Arras
- 1936 : Un homme comme les autres
- 1937 : La terre est ronde
- 1939 : Histoire de rire
- 1941 : La Marguerite
- 1944 : Les Fiancés du Havre
- 1945 : Le Soldat et la sorcière
- 1946 : Les Nuits de la colère
- 1946 : L'Archipel Lenoir, ou Il ne faut pas toucher aux choses inutiles, Pourquoi pas moi?
- 1950 : Dieu le savait, ou la Vie n'est pas sérieuse
- 1952 : Sens Interdit, ou Les Âges de la Vie
- 1953 : Les Invités du Bon Dieu
- 1953 : Une femme trop honnête, ou Tout est dans la façon de le dire
- 1954 : Le Miroir
- 1959 : Boulevard Durand
- 1964 : Comme les Chardons
- 1966 : La Rue Noire

== Bibliography ==
- J. van den Esch. Armand Salacrou, dramaturge de l'angoisse. Paris, 1947
- David Looseley. A Search for Commitment: the Theatre of Armand Salacrou. University of Exeter, 1985.
- Juris Silenieks. Themes and Dramatic Forms in the Plays of Armand Salacrou. University of Nebraska, Lincoln, 1967.
- Fiorenza di Franco. Le théâtre de Salacrou. Gallimard, Paris, 1970.
- Annie Ubersfeld. Armand Salacrou. Seghers, Paris, 1970.
- Philippe Bébon. Salacrou. Éditions universitaires, Paris, 1971.
