= Ahrenberg =

Ahrenberg is a surname. Notable people with the surname include:

- Johan Jacob Ahrenberg (1847–1914), Finnish architect, writer, and artist
- Staffan Ahrenberg (born 1957), Swedish art collector, film producer, and publisher
- Theodor Ahrenberg (1912–1989), Swedish businessman and collector
