= Still Life with Checked Tablecloth =

1915 painting by Juan Gris

- Nature morte à la nappe à carreaux (French)
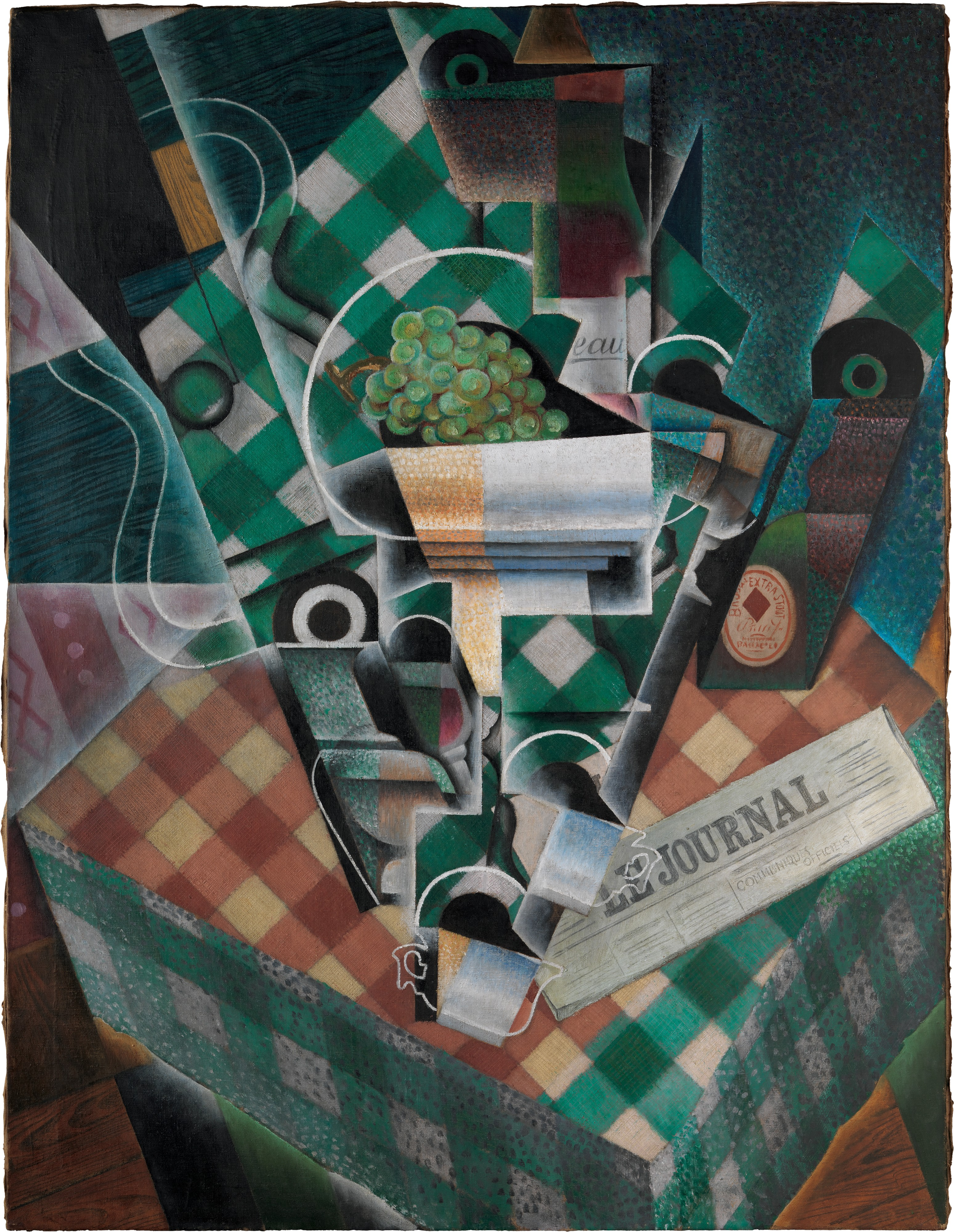
- Artist: Juan Gris
- Year: March 1915
- Medium: Oil and graphite on canvas
- Dimensions: 116.5 cm × 89.2 cm (45.9 in × 35.1 in)
- Location: Metropolitan Museum of Art, New York

Still Life with Checked Tablecloth (originally titled Le compotier) is an early 20th century painting by Spanish Cubist artist Juan Gris. Done in oil and graphite on canvas, the painting depicts a table set with grapes, a bottle of red wine, beer, a newspaper and guitar. In addition, the composite image formed from these various objects can be seen as Gris' take on a bull's head. The work is in the collection of the Metropolitan Museum of Art.

== Background ==
Formerly in the collection of Léonce Rosenberg, Paris (no. 5114), the work was reproduced in Bulletin de "L'Effort Moderne" no. 16, in June 1925, titled Le compotier. The painting later formed part of the collection of Gottlieb Reber. It was reproduced in the French literary journal Cahiers d'art, Paris, in 1927, no. 4-5 (p. 172) titled Le compotier. Subsequently, the work was published in Daniel-Henry Kahnweiler's, Juan Gris, His Life and Work, London, 1947 (illustrated pl. 21), and is reproduced on page 195D of the Douglas Cooper, Juan Gris, Catalogue raisonné de l’oeuvre peint, vol. I, Paris, 1977, no. 127, p. 194. The works was first exhibited at the Staatliche Kunstsammlungen Dresden, Internationale Kunst Ausstellung, June – September 1926, no. 374.

Kahnweiler wrote of work from this period: "Apparently Gris' ideal of architectural grandeur can only be realised with a static subject. But during the summer of 1915 he produced a series of pictures which are full of movement." Still Life with Checked Tablecloth was painted in Paris by Gris during the month of March, shortly after spending several months in the South of France following the onset of World War I. In a letter to Kahnweiler dated on 26 March 1915, Gris wrote of his evolution as a painter: "I think I have really made progress recently and that my pictures begin to have a unity which they have lacked till now. They are no longer those inventories of objects which used to depress me so much."

Author and critic James Thrall Soby wrote of Nature morte à la nappe à carreaux in the catalogue for a 1958 exhibition at the Museum of Modern Art in New York, in which the painting was reproduced but not included in the exhibition:

...for sheer variety his work of 1915 is outstanding. The strange, lovely fluorescence of The Checked Tablecloth is a long cry from the splintered complexity of the Still Life. And in connection with the compositional arrangement of the former picture, mention should be made of Gris' passion for triangles. Lipchitz has told the writer that Gris revered the triangle because it is "so accurate and endless a form." He added that once when he and Gris found a triangular-shaped drinking glass, the latter explained: "You see we are influencing life at last."

== Art market ==
In 2014, Still Life with Checked Tablecloth was sold at Christie's London for £34.8 million ($57.1 million), attaining a world record price for a work by Juan Gris at a public auction. These surpassed previous records of $20.8 million for his 1915 work, Livre, pipe et verres, and $28.6 million for the 1913 painting, Violon et guitare. Still Life with Checked Tablecloth was purchased by the Metropolitan Museum of Art with funds donated by Leonard Lauder.

== See also ==
- Crystal Cubism
