= The Fruit Bowl =

Drawing by Juan Gris

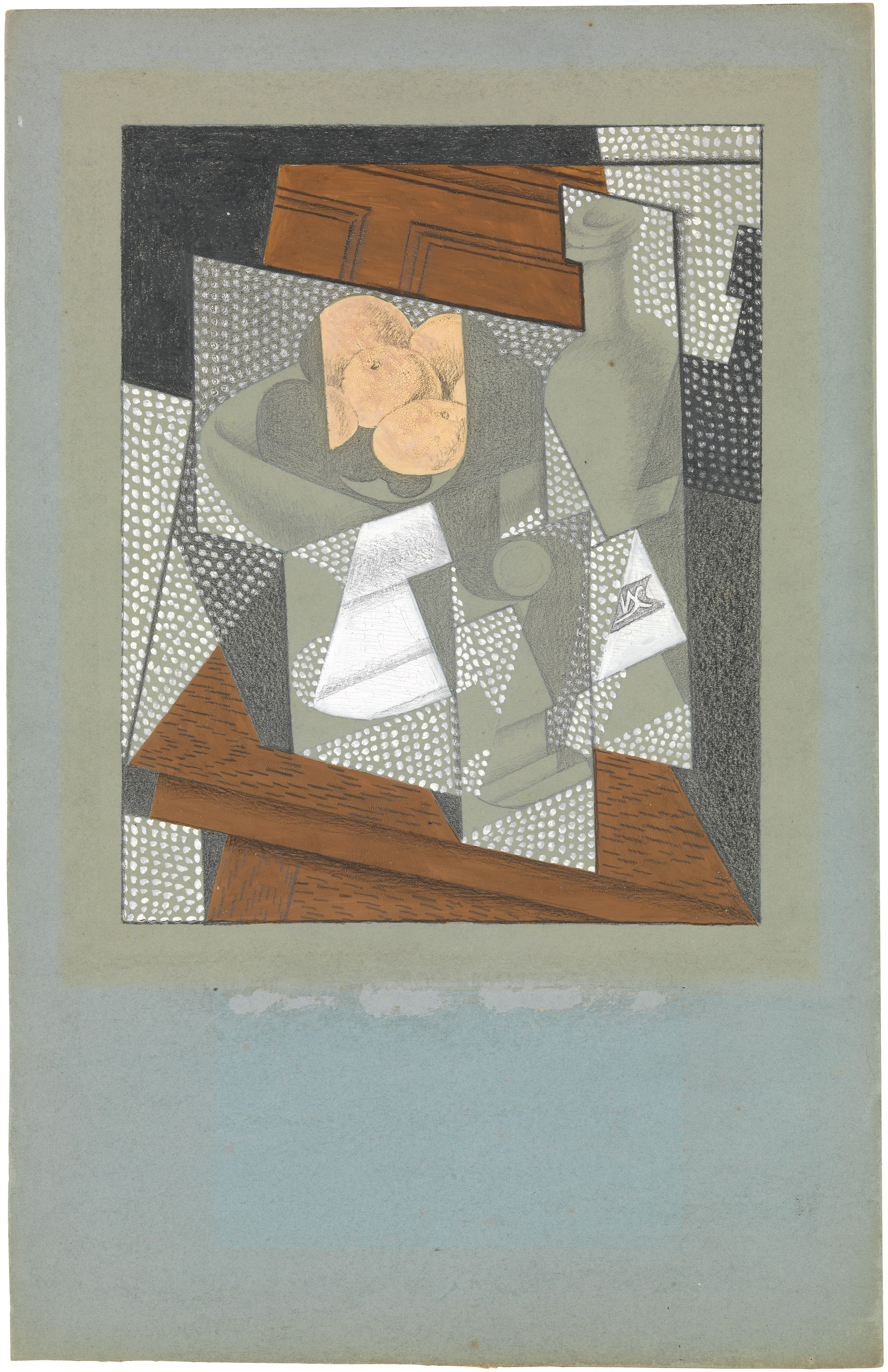
- Artist: Juan Gris
- Year: 1915-1916
- Medium: Graphite, wax crayon, and gouache on blue wove paper-faced paperboard
- Dimensions: 27.1 cm × 21.6 cm (10.7 in × 8.5 in)
- Location: Metropolitan Museum of Art, New York

The Fruit Bowl is an early 20th century drawing by Juan Gris. The work was produced as part of a collaboration between Gris and Pierre Reverdy to commission a book filled with lithographs made from the former's paintings. The project was interrupted by the onset of World War I in 1914 and never finished. Reverdy composed a poem titled The Fruit Bowl to accompany the painting. Gris' work is currently in the collection of the Metropolitan Museum of Art.

This piece belongs to the movement of Synthetic Cubism, where pioneers like Pablo Picasso and Georges Braque began to find new ways to expand the genre of painting, the most important of these being the development of collage. The idea that commonplace items like paper could be elevated to the level of high art was foundational in the progression of these forms.
