= Staffan Ahrenberg =

Swedish art collector, entrepreneur and film producer

Staffan Ahrenberg (born 27 September 1957, in Stockholm) is a Swedish art collector, entrepreneur, film producer, and the owner and publisher of the French publishing house Cahiers d'art.

== Early life ==
Born the second child of businessman and art collector Theodor Ahrenberg (1912–89) and Ulla Ahrenberg (born Frisell), Ahrenberg spent his childhood in Stockholm and Chexbres, Switzerland, where the family relocated in 1962. He was exposed to art from a young age through his father's extensive collection, assembled between the late 1940s and 1980s and featuring works by Pablo Picasso, Henri Matisse, Marc Chagall, Le Corbusier, Olle Bærtling, Sam Francis, Mark Tobey and Lucio Fontana. Key modernist works in the collection included the two versions of Matisse's Apollo (1953), Picasso's Nude in a rocking chair (1956) and Chagall's Les mariés sous le baldaquin (1949). Ahrenberg's introduction to contemporary art came through the atelier at the family property at Chexbres, where artists including Christo, Tadeusz Kantor, Enrico Baj, Jean Tinguely, and Niki de Saint Phalle lived and worked between 1962 and 1977.

== Career ==
In 1975 Ahrenberg met film producer Alexander Salkind (1921–97), producer of Superman (1978) starring Marlon Brando, with whom he later apprenticed for three years before moving to Los Angeles to launch his career as a producer. Ahrenberg's films as a producer or executive producer since include Johnny Mnemonic (1995), starring Keanu Reeves and directed by Robert Longo; Total Eclipse (1995), starring Leonardo DiCaprio and directed by Agnieszka Holland; The Quiet American, starring Michael Caine and directed by Phillip Noyce; and Summer Love (2006), starring Bogusław Linda and directed by Piotr Uklański.

In 2011 Ahrenberg acquired Cahiers d’Art, a publishing house, gallery and revue based at 14 rue du Dragon, Paris, and founded in 1926 by art historian and publisher Christian Zervos (1889–1970). On 18 October 2012 Ahrenberg relaunched Cahiers d’Art with the first issue of its eponymous revue since 1960, dedicated to the work of Ellsworth Kelly and co-edited with Hans Ulrich Obrist and Sam Keller. Subsequent issues have continued collaborations with influential living artists, including Rosemarie Trockel, Hiroshi Sugimoto and Gabriel Orozco. Cahiers d’Art books published by Ahrenberg include Calder by Matter (2012), Ellsworth Kelly: Catalogue Raisonné of Paintings, Reliefs, and Sculpture. Vol. 1, 1940–1953 (2015), Thomas Schütte: Watercolors for Robert Walser and Donald Young, 2011–2012 (2016), and most notably the 2013 re-issue of the 33-volume catalogue raisonné Pablo Picasso by Christian Zervos (the “Zervos”), originally released between 1932 and 1978.

Ahrenberg also coordinates exhibitions, both those at the Cahiers d’Art Paris gallery spaces such as “Hiroshi Sugimoto” (2014) and “Miró” (2018), and at other institutions such as “Le Corbusier. The Secrets of Creativity: Between Painting and Architecture” at the Pushkin State Museum of Fine Arts in Moscow (2012) and “Moment – Le Corbusier’s Secret Laboratory” at Moderna Museet in Stockholm (2013).

Ahrenberg was nominated Chevalier de l'ordre des arts et des lettres by the French Ministry of Culture in May 2018.

== Art collection ==
Ahrenberg has collected modern and contemporary art since 1977, beginning with geometrical art including that of Auguste Herbin and Josef Albers. His current collection contains works by Picasso, Matisse, Kandinsky, Le Corbusier, Richard Serra, Robert Longo, Wolfgang Tillmans, Cildo Meireles, Jenny Holzer, Martin Kippenberger and Adrián Villar Rojas, among many others.

== Filmography ==
- Konstsamlaren och katastrofen (The Art Collector and the Tragedy), 2017 (as himself)
- Summer Love, 2006 (producer)
- The Quiet American, 2002 (producer)
- Another Nine & a Half Weeks, 1997 (producer)
- Total Eclipse, 1995 (producer)
- Johnny Mnemonic, 1995 (executive producer)
- The Turn of the Screw, 1992 (executive producer)
- Jersey Girl, 1992 (producer)
- Zandalee, 1991 (executive producer)
- Lobster Man from Mars, 1989 (executive producer)
- Waxwork, 1988 (producer)

== Publications ==
- Le Corbusier’s Secret Laboratory. From Painting to Architecture, Hatje Cantz, Ostfildern, 2013 (co-editor with Jean-Louis Cohen and contributor)
- Cahiers d’Art. Picasso In the Studio, special issue 2015, (interview with Robert Longo)
- Living with Picasso, Matisse and Christo: Theodor Ahrenberg and His Collections, Thames & Hudson, London, 2018 (contributor)
- Ett liv med Matisse, Picasso och Christo – Theodor Ahrenberg och hans samlingar, Arvinius + Orfeus Publishing, Stockholm, 2018 (contributor)
- Cahiers d’Art. Miró, September 2018, (interview with Miquel Barceló)
