= Juan Legua =

Painting by Juan Gris

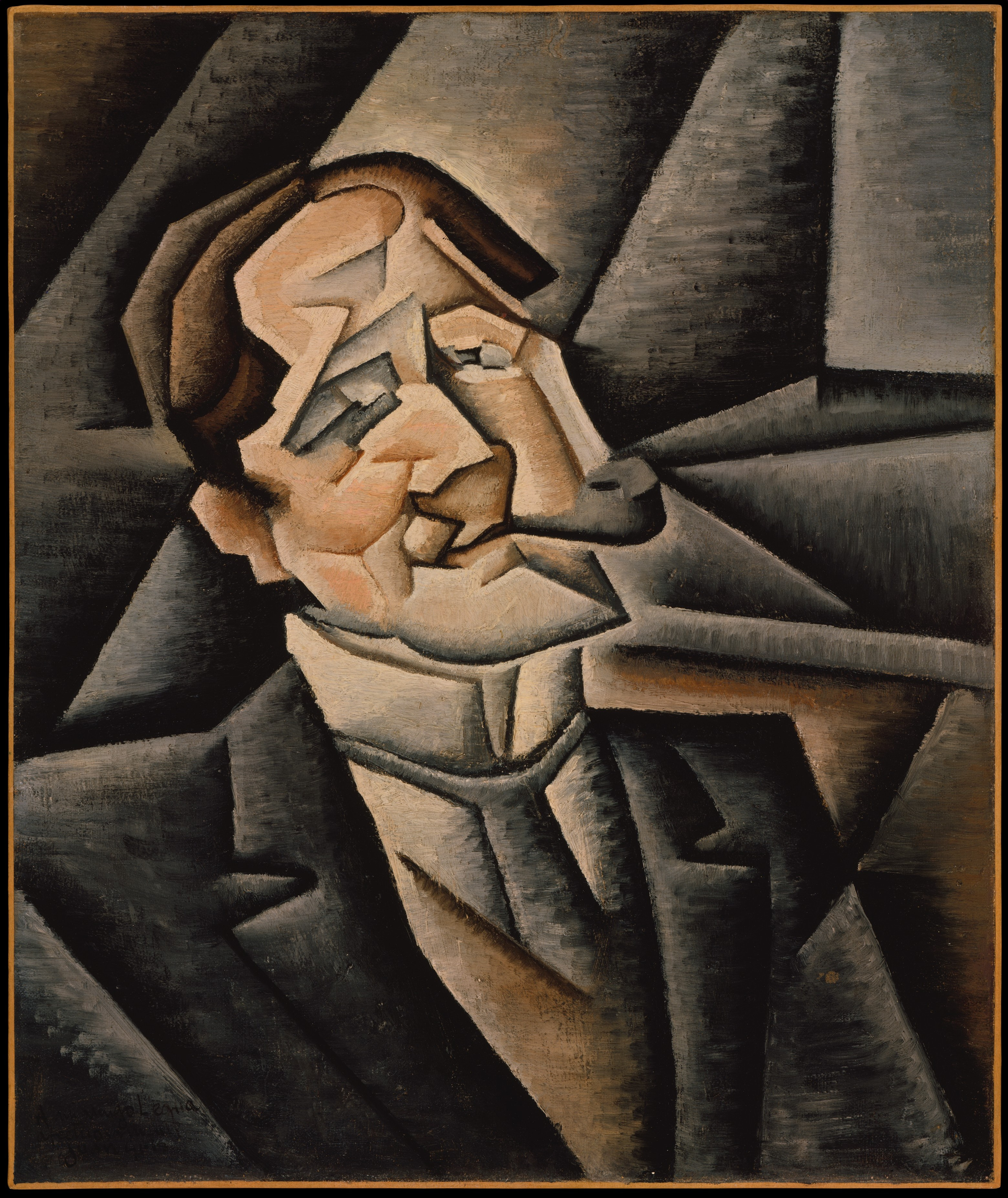
- Artist: Juan Gris
- Year: 1911
- Medium: Oil on canvas
- Dimensions: 54.9 cm × 46 cm (21.6 in × 18 in)
- Location: Metropolitan Museum of Art; New York

Juan Legua is an oil-on-canvas painting by Spanish cubist Juan Gris, created in 1911. It depicts a male sitter smoking a pipe and is one of Gris' earliest works in the cubist style. The work is in the collection of the Metropolitan Museum of Art, in New York.
