= The Breakfast =

Painting by Juan Gris

- Le petit Déjeuner
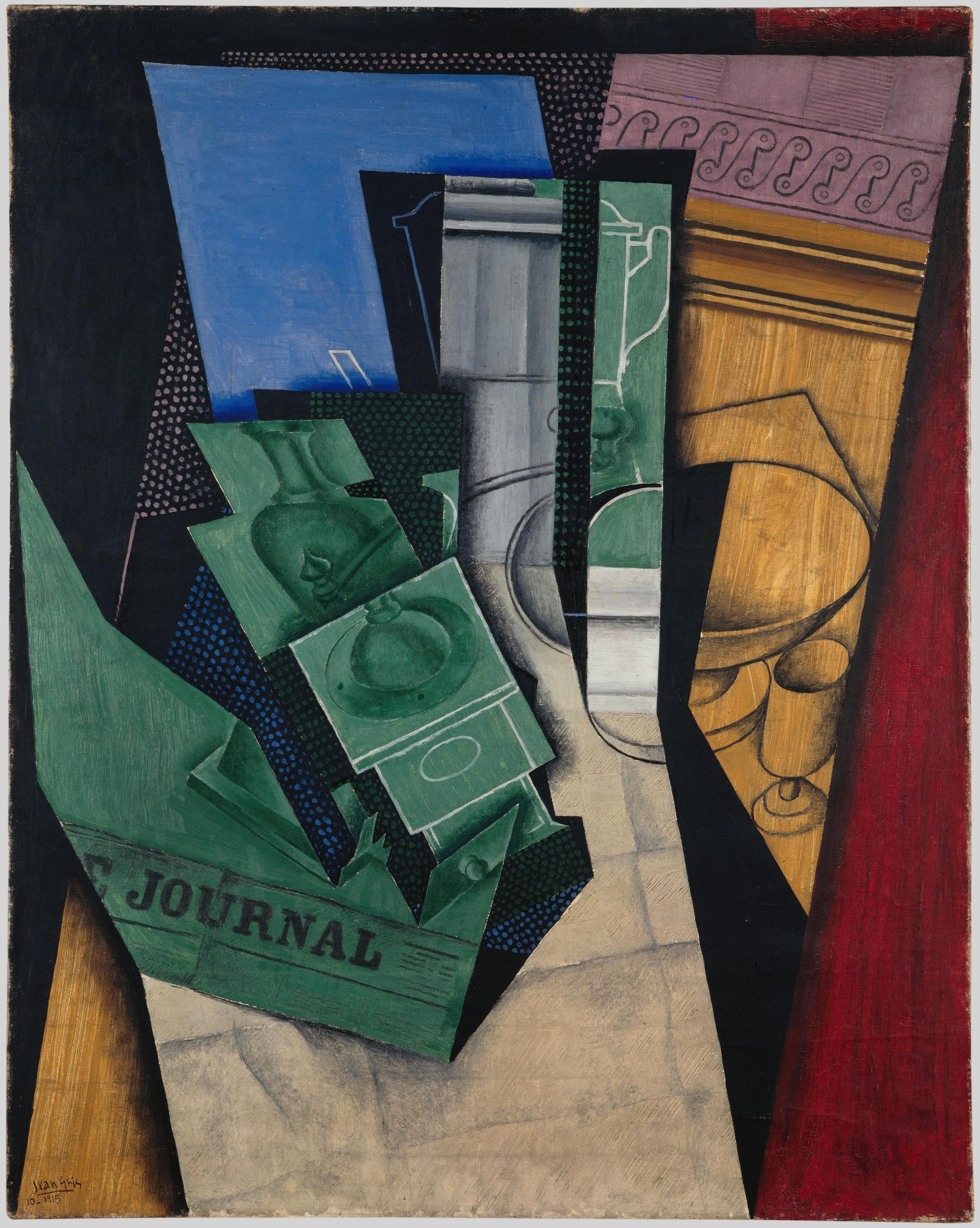
- Year: 1915
- Dimensions: 92 cm (36 in) × 73 cm (29 in)
- Location: France

The Bekfast (Le Petit Déjeuner) is a painting by Juan Gris, painted in October 1915. It is in the collection of the Musée National d'Art Moderne, in Paris, purchased in 1947.

== Description ==
This cubist canvas is executed in oil and charcoal. It is a still life depicting a coffee grinder, a coffee pot and a fruit bowl .

== History ==
From 2018 to 2019, it was in the exhibition, Le Cubisme, at the Centre Pompidou, Paris.
