= Theodor Ahrenberg =

Swedish businessman and collector (1912–1989)

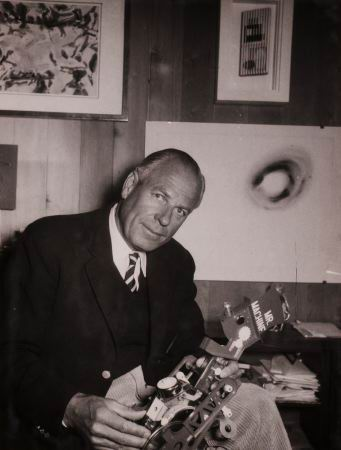
Ahrenberg in the 1960s

Theodor "Teto" Ahrenberg (2 March 1912 – 21 June 1989) was a Swedish businessman and collector. His extensive collection featured works by artists such as Pablo Picasso, Henri Matisse, Marc Chagall, Le Corbusier, Olle Bærtling, Sam Francis, Mark Tobey, Christo, Lucio Fontana, Tadeusz Kantor, Enrico Baj, Jean Tinguely, and Niki de Saint Phalle. Key works in the collection included the two versions of Matisse's Apollo (1953), Picasso's Nude in a rocking chair (1956) and Chagall's Les mariés sous le baldaquin (1949).

== Life ==
=== Early life and career ===
Theodor Ahrenberg, son of Swedish shipping magnate and owner of Th. Ahrenberg Rederi (Th. Ahrenberg Shipping Co.) Ossian Ahrenberg and his wife Naëma Ahrenberg (born Wijkander), spent his youth in Gothenburg, centred at the family home at Viktor Rydbergsgatan 14. Following a moderate academic performance at school, Ahrenberg was withdrawn from Högre Samskola by his father, and began working in shipping in Stettin, Hamburg and Newcastle. Ahrenberg later described this training as important preparation for his career as a collector: “You had to be far-sighted, careful and daring, all at the same time ... and you simply had to succeed. That was the charm of shipping, and in my case, it could be said that such speculative tendencies and audacity ... left their mark on me, even in the new world into which I would enter, that of art. In 1939–40 Ahrenberg fought as a volunteer in the Swedish forces against Finland in the Winter War against Russia, and was highly decorated.

Returning to Gothenburg in 1941 and following the decline of Th. Ahrenberg Shipping Co., Ahrenberg moved to Stockholm to further his career. He first worked inventorying barrels for Nynäs Petroleum, then moved to a more senior position at the Trade and Industry Commission, before finally commencing an executive managerial role at the Gas and Coke Economic Federation (GOKEF).

=== Collecting beginnings ===
On business trips throughout Europe for GOKEF beginning in the late 1940s, Ahrenberg discovered his passion for modern art and began collecting, with an initial focus on graphic prints including those of Picasso. In time he amassed one of the most important and qualitative private European collections of twentieth-century Western art.

From the early 1950s Agnes Widlund (1910–2005), founder and director of Gallery Samlaren at Birger Jarlsgatan 1 in Stockholm, began advising Ahrenberg on his collection. Under Widlund's guidance the collection expanded to include works by Matisse, Chagall, Le Corbusier, Georges Braque and Georges Rouault. Widlund arranged visits by Ahrenberg to artists in their studios including Picasso, Matisse, Chagall and Le Corbusier, beginning Ahrenberg's lifelong passion for meeting the artists whose work he collected and purchasing from them directly.

=== Relationship with Swedish art establishment ===
Ahrenberg became a central figure in Swedish and European art circles, and held positions including secretary of the Tessin Society and was a board member of art associations including Friends of Nationalmuseum, Friends of Moderna Museet, and Aspect. He dedicated himself to improving conditions for art students and young artists, culminating in his controversial speech “The Poverty of Art in the Welfare State” made at Aspect's public meeting at Stockholm's Academy of Fine Arts on 3 September 1959. In it he called for more state support for artists and art institutions, and criticized then director of Stockholm's Nationalmuseum Carl Nordenfalk (1907–92) for his apprehensive approach to funding. Ahrenberg thus conflicted with Sweden's conservative art institutions, particularly in areas of finance.

=== Ahrenberg Museum by Le Corbusier ===
Such disputes, above all with Nordenfalk who rejected Ahrenberg's proposals of December 1959 that the collection be deposited at Nationalmuseum or another Swedish institution, led Ahrenberg to the decision to build his own exhibition space in Stockholm, known as the Palais Ahrenberg or Ahrenberg Museum. In 1961 Le Corbusier, with whom Ahrenberg was on close terms, agreed to design the museum; the plans were presented publicly in 1962. Le Corbusier took his inspiration from a design which he had made two years previously for a similar project in Tokyo and which was ultimately executed in 1964 for the Heidi Weber Museum in Zurich, also known as the “Centre Le Corbusier”. A model of the Ahrenberg Museum, based on Le Corbusier's original plans, has been housed there since 2005.

=== Loss of collection and relocation to Switzerland ===
The Ahrenberg Museum was, however, never built, as the Swedish state prosecuted Ahrenberg, controversially confiscated the collection, and sold it in an enforced series of auctions beginning in 1963. Ahrenberg and his second wife Ulla (born Ulla Frisell in 1931) and their four children subsequently settled at the house Le Rocher in Chexbres, Switzerland, above the north bank of Lake Geneva, where he began to rebuild the collection. Specifically he established an atelier at Le Rocher where he invited a series of artists of the post-war European avant-garde to live and work, often for several months at a time. Ahrenberg died on 21 June 1989 at the age of 77 in Vevey.

== The first collection ==
Ahrenberg's first collection was at the time one of the most extensive private collections of twentieth-century Western art, comprising around 1,000 works that presented a cross-section of modernism.

Ahrenberg acquired works by both famous and relatively renowned artists including Henri Matisse (1869–1954), Pablo Picasso (1881–1973), Georges Braque (1882–1963), Marc Chagall (1887–1985), Le Corbusier (1887–1965), Fernand Léger, (1881–1955), Alberto Giacometti, (1901–66), Henry Moore (1898–1986), Mark Tobey (1890–1976), among other, non-established figures. According to Ulla Ahrenberg the collection at its height featured alone hundreds of works by Picasso and nearly all of Matisse's sculptures.

Ahrenberg also passionately supported his sometimes controversial fellow Swedish artists, including Carl Kylberg, Olle Bærtling, Einar Hylander, Öyvind Fahlström, Richard Mortensen, Robert Jacobsen and Carl Fredrik Reuterswärd. Another focus was artists from Eastern Europe whose practice was then limited by restrictive state policies behind the Iron Curtain, in particular Tadeusz Kantor (1915–90). Ahrenberg's outspoken support for such artists at this time only increased the tension between himself and the conservative art establishment.

The value of the collection today has been estimated at over a billion Euros.

== The second collection ==
Ahrenberg's second collection comprised mainly works by artists who were guests at the Le Rocher atelier. These were primarily friends and included Sam Francis, Christo, Lucio Fontana, Jean Tinguely, Niki de Saint Phalle, Arman, Robert Rauschenberg, Mark Tobey, Enrico Baj, Yaacov Agam and Heinrich Richter. The character of the second collection stands in stark contrast to that of the first, which had provided an overview of modernism through Ahrenberg's choices. In art critic Folke Edward's words the new collection “showed a playful, experimental and personal character; it is a subjective and spontaneous, not shaped by a desire to present an objective or qualitative overview.” In time Ahrenberg's second collection grew to encompass around 6,000 objects, among them curiosities and experimental works such as the ceramics (including plates, bowls, piggy banks and ashtrays) and wine labels – all idiosyncratically and often whimsically decorated by artists visiting Le Rocher, including Albert Chubac, Lars Gynning, Gérard “Imof” Imhof, Julio Zapata, Roberto Crippa and Ricci Riggenbach.

After Theodor Ahrenberg's death in 1989, Ulla Ahrenberg has continued her role as custodian and archivist of the collection. Their son Staffan Ahrenberg, a Hollywood producer and entrepreneur, is also an art collector; his own collection includes contemporary American and European art, such as that of Richard Serra, Robert Longo, Wolfgang Tillmans, Cildo Meireles, Jenny Holzer, Martin Kippenberger and Adrián Villar Rojas. In October 2012 Staffan Ahrenberg relaunched the renowned French art and literature journal Cahiers d'art.

In September 2018 the first comprehensive monograph of Theodor Ahrenberg's life and collections was published in English as Living with Picasso, Matisse and Christo: Theodor Ahrenberg and His Collections by Thames & Hudson, London; and in Swedish as Ett liv med Matisse, Picasso och Christo – Theodor Ahrenberg och hans samlingar by Arvinius + Orfeus Publishing, Stockholm.

== Selected exhibitions ==
- 1954 Nationalmuseum, Stockholm, “Modern Utländsk Konst ur Svenska Privatsamlingar” (Foreign Modern Art from Swedish Private Collections)
- 1957 Nationalmuseum, Stockholm
- 1957 Skånska Konstmuseum, Lund
- 1957 Konsthallen Helsingfors, Helsinki
- 1958 Musée des Beaux-Arts, Liège
- 1959 Kunsthaus Zürich
- 1960 Göteborgs Konstförening, Konsthallen, Gothenburg
- 1961 Frederiksberg Radhus, Copenhagen
- 1967 Salle communale de Chexbres, “aspects”
- 1977 Kunstverein für die Rheinlande und Westfalen, Düsseldorf “Der Sammler Theodor Ahrenberg und das Atelier in Chexbres. 15 Jahre mit Kunst und Künstlern. 1960–1975”
- 1987 Kunsthalle Schirn Frankfurt/Main, “Le Corbusier secret. Zeichnungen und Collagen aus der Sammlung Ahrenberg” (then at Musée cantonal des beaux-arts de Lausanne; Nordjyllands Kunstmuseum, Aalborg; Lunds Konsthall, Lund; Museum of Finnish Architecture, Helsinki; Pori Art Museum, Pori; and Neue Galerie, Linz)
- 1993 Göteborgs Konstmuseet (Gothenburg), “Ahrenberg Collection” (then at Östergötlands Länsmuseum, Linköping; Museum St. Ingbert, St. Ingbert; and Musée Fondation Deutsch, Belmont-sur-Lausanne)
- 1998 Musée des Beaux-Arts de Mons, Belgium, “Hej Teto! Collection Ahrenberg”
- 1999 Palais Bénédictine (Fécamp, Région Haute-Normandie), “Collection Ahrenberg – 50 ans d’histoire de l’art”

== Selected publications ==
- Ahrenberg, Theodor, Jag har ju ändå en Picasso. Memoarer av Teto Ahrenberg, utmanaren, konstsamlaren, mecenaten, Ulla * Ahrenberg and Folke Edwards (eds.), Walhström & Widstrand, Stockholm, 1993
- Ahrenberg, Theodor and Ulla: Le Corbusier Secret. Dessins et collages de la collection Ahrenberg, Lausanne, Vevey, 1987
- aspects, 5 ans d’activités à l’atelier du Rocher Chexbres (exh. cat.), Salle communale de Chexbres, 1967
- Billeter, Erika (ed.), Dessins et collages de la collection Ahrenberg, Kunsthalle Schirn, Frankfurt/Main, 1987
- Catalogue of Forty-Nine Bronzes by Matisse. The Property of Mr. and Mrs Theodor Ahrenberg of Stockholm, Sotheby & Co., London, 1960
- Collection Ahrenberg. 50 ans d’histoire de l’art (exh. cat.), Palais Bénédictine, Fécamp, 1999
- Edwards, Folke, and Lindqvist, Gunnar, Ahrenberg Collection (exh. cat.), Göteborgs Konstmuseum, Gothenburg, and Östergötlands Länsmuseum, Linköping, 1993
- Galérie Denise René, Mes années 50, Galérie Denise René, Paris, 1988
- Hering, Karl-Heinz (ed.), Der Sammler Theodor Ahrenberg und das Atelier in Chexbres. 15 Jahre mit Kunst und Künstlern 1960–1975 (exh. cat.), Kunstverein für die Rheinlande und Westfalen, Düsseldorf, 1977
- Hering, Karl-Heinz (ed.), Heinrich Richter. Gemälde, Aquarelle, Zeichnungen 1961–1978 (exh. cat.), Kunstverein für die Rheinlande und Westfalen, Düsseldorf, 1978
- Hering, Karl-Heinz (ed.), Heinrich Richter. Illustrationen zur Blechtrommel von Günter Grass. Zeichnungen zu Les Neuf Muses (Die Mädchen von Chexbres) (exh. cat.), Kunstverein für die Rheinlande und Westfalen, Düsseldorf, 1969
- Hej Teto! Collection Ahrenberg (exh. cat.), Musée des Beaux-Arts de Mons, Belgium, 1998
- Paletten, no. 3, 1959
- Richter, Heinrich, Les Neuf Muses, Editions Forces Vives, Paris and Geneva, 1968
- Richter, Tilo: “Dabei sein in der Küche der Kunst. Theodor Ahrenberg im Porträt”, Frankfurter Allgemeine Sonntagszeitung, 17 April 2011, page 57

== Films ==
- Friberg, J. P. Morgan (dir.), In the Name of Art. A Portrait of Theodor "Teto" Ahrenberg, Collector and Patron Devoted to Artists and their Art, Göteborgs Konstmuseum, Gothenburg, and Östergötlands Länsmuseum, Linköping, 1990
- Törnvall, Clara (dir.), Konstsamlaren och katastrofen (The Art Collector and the Tragedy), SVT Play, 2017
