= Christian Zervos =

Greek-French art historian, critic, collector, writer and publisher

Christian Zervos (Greek: Χρήστος Ζερβός; Argostoli, Cefalonia, Greece, January 1, 1889 – September 12, 1970, Paris) was a Greek-French art historian, critic, collector, writer and publisher.

Born in Cefalonia and raised in Alexandria and Marseille, in 1911 Zervos moved to Paris to study philosophy. In 1916 he became the editor of the magazines L'Art d'aujourd'hui and Les arts de la maison. Zervos subsequently founded the magazine Cahiers d'art (1926–1960) in Paris, and ran an art gallery.

He was a connoisseur of modern painting in his time, and of Greek art and prehistoric art. He published several books, of which the most important are: The Art of Crete, The Art of the Cyclades, L'art de l'époque du Renne en France, and a catalogue raisonné of the work of Pablo Picasso.

M. Christian Durquet, Conservator of Patrimony at the Musée de l'Art Contemporain, ordered the establishment of a Zervos Museum at Vézelay.

Salvador Dalí once described him as the 'most mediocre person that ever existed.'

== Publications ==
- Zervos, Christian; Soldevilla Zubiburu, Fernando; Gudiol, José (1937). L'Art de la Catalogne de la Seconde Moitié du Neuvième Siècle à la Fin du Quinzième Siècle [The Art of Catalonia from the Second Half of the Ninth Century to the End of the Fifteenth Century]. Paris, France: Éditions "Cahiers d'art".
- Raoul Dufy, éditions Cahiers d'art, 1928
- Catalogue raisonné des œuvres de Pablo Picasso, éditions Cahiers d'art, Paris, 1932-1978
- Art de la Mésopotamie, éditions Cahiers d'art, 1935
- Matthias Grünewald : le retable d'Isenheim, éditions Cahiers d'art, 1936
- Art de la Catalogne, éditions Cahiers d'art, 1937
- Histoire de l'art contemporain, éditions Cahiers d'art, 1938
- Dessins de Picasso, éditions Cahiers d'art, 1949
- Fernand Léger : œuvres de 1905 à 1952, éditions Cahiers d'art, 1952
- Civilisation de la Sardaigne : néolithique au nouragique, éditions Cahiers d'art, 1954
- L'art des Cyclades, du début à la fin de l'âge du bronze, 2500-1100 avant notre ère, éditions Cahiers d'art, 1957
- Corpora, éditions Cahiers d'art, 1957
- Chauvin, éditions Cahiers d'art, 1960
- Brâncuși, éditions Cahiers d'art, 1957

== Bibliography ==
- Index général de la revue Cahiers d'art, 1926-1960, pref. Dora Vallier, Paris, Ed. Cahiers d'art, 1981.
- Chara Kolokytha, Formalism and Ideology in 20th century Art: Cahiers d'Art, magazine, gallery, publishing house (1926-1960), PhD thesis, Northumbria University, 2016.
- Chara Kolokytha, 'The Art Press and Visual Culture in Paris during the Great Depression: Cahiers d'Art, Minotaure and Verve' in: Visual Resources, An International Journal of Documentation 3, vol.29, Sept. 2013, pp. 184–215.
- Chara Kolokytha, 'Christian Zervos et Cahiers d'art, Archives de la Bibliothèque Kandinsky' in Konsthistorisk Tidskrift 4, vol. 82, 2013, pp. 339–342.
- Polina Kosmadaki (ed.),"Christian Zervos & Cahiers d’art: the archaic turn", exhibition catalogue, Benaki Museum, Athens, 2019. 327 p. with texts by P. Kosmadaki, Alexandre Farnoux, Panayotis Tournikiotis, Eleni Stavroulaki, Christian Derouet.
- Jean-Pierre De Rycke, "Christian Zervos et Tériade: deux insulaires grecs à la conquête de l'avant-garde européenne", Paris - Athènes, 1863 - 1940, Pinacothèque Nationale et Musée Alexandros Soutzos. Athènes, 2006.
- Kim Grant, "Cahiers d'Art and the Evolution of Modernist Painting", The Journal of Modern Periodical Studies, v. 1, n. 2, 2010, pp. 216–227.
- Cahiers d'art, Musée Zervos à Vézelay, sous la direction de Christian Derouet, Paris, Hazan, Perrigny, Conseil général de l'Yonne, DL 2006.
- Christopher Green, "Zervos, Picasso and Brassaï, ethnographers in the field: a critical collaboration", in Malcolm Gee (ed.) Art criticism since 1900, Manchester University Press, 1993.
- Valery Dupont, Le discours anthropologique dans l'art des années 1920-1930 en France, à travers l'exemple des Cahiers d'art, thèse, 1999, Art et Archéologie, Université de Dijon.
