= Cahiers d'art =

French artistic and literary journal

Cahiers d'Art
- Editor: Staffan Ahrenberg, Sam Keller, Hans-Ulrich Obrist
- Former editors: Christian Zervos
- Frequency: no fixed frequency
- Founder: Christian Zervos
- Founded: 1926
- Company: Editions Cahiers d'Art SARL
- Country: France
- Based in: Paris
- Language: French, English
- Website: cahiersdart.fr

Cahiers d'Art is a French artistic and literary journal founded in 1926 by Christian Zervos. Cahiers d'Art is also an eponymous publishing house which has published many monographs on artists living in France in the first half of the twentieth century. Publications include the definitive catalogue of works by Pablo Picasso, Pablo Picasso par Christian Zervos, in 33 volumes, with over 16,000 images.

Cahiers d'Art carries no advertising and is published on an irregular schedule.

== History ==
The journal, founded by art critic Christian Zervos in Paris at 14, rue du Dragon in 1926, and was published until 1960. Though publication was interrupted from 1941 to 1943, the first post-war issue was dated 1940–1944 and focused on poets and writers from the Resistance, including Vercors. Cahiers d'Art also published selections from poet Paul Éluard's Open Book I (1940) and Open Book II (1942).

After World War II, the psychoanalyst Jacques Lacan was invited by Zervos to publish two articles on logic: Logical Time and the Assertion of Anticipated Certainty (1945) and The Number Thirteen and the Logical Form of Suspicion (1946). Samuel Beckett also contributed one of his earliest texts in French, The Painting of Van de Velde or the World and the Pants.

The journal has been noted for the quality of its articles and illustrations which promoted Modern Art in France for over thirty years. Artists represented include Picasso, Matisse, Fernand Léger, Max Ernst, Raoul Dufy, Marc Chagall, Brâncuși, Van Gogh, Paul Klee, Henri Laurens, Moholy-Nagy, Jean Lurçat, Joan Miró, Calder, Victor Brauner, De Chirico, Wolfgang Paalen, Marcel Duchamp, and Man Ray.

Swedish collector Staffan Ahrenberg purchased the publication and relaunched it in October 2012.

== Since 2012 ==
- The first issue featured works by Ellsworth Kelly, Cyprien Gaillard, Sarah Morris and Adrián Villar Rojas, and the architecture of Oscar Niemeyer. As part of the re-launch of Cahiers d'Art, 14 rue du Dragon has reopened as a gallery and library, while 15 rue du Dragon now operates as an exhibition space for limited edition prints and editions by contemporary artists.
- In October 2013, Cahiers d'Art presented an exhibition of Philippe Parreno including recent drawings of the artist as well as a dozen master drawings : Francisco de Goya, Victor Hugo, Wassily Kandinsky, Ad Reinhardt, Richard Case, Liam Gillick, Matthew Barney, Koo Jeong-A and John Cage.
- In 2014 Cahiers d'Art released the newly published edition of the Pablo Picasso by Christian Zervos catalogue, known by many simply as 'the Zervos', in French and for the first time in English. This catalogue of more than 16,000 works in 33 volumes contains updates from the Picasso Administration.
- The second issue of the revue, N°1-2, 2013 features the work of Rosemarie Trockel who created especially for Cahiers d'Art a vinyl inserted in each revue that you can squeeze to make a sculpture. She also designed a plexiglass box for the limited edition. The publication also introduces the work of Peter Fischli and David Weiss, Le Corbusier, Inge Mahn, Absalon, and Riccardo Paratore, as well as texts by Hans Ulrich Obrist, Brigid Doherty, Joan Simon, Jean Louis Cohen and poems by Rolf Dieter Brinkmann. On the occasion of this release Cahiers d'Art presented an exhibition of Trockel's work. in their galleries of 14 and 15 rue du Dragon in Paris.

== Bibliography ==
- Matisse. Cahiers d'art, the pivotal 1930's - Exhibition catalogue, Coedited by Réunion des musées nationaux - Grand Palais / Musée d'Orsay, 2022
- Christian Zervos & Cahiers d'Art, the archaic turn, texts by Polina Kosmadaki, Alexandre Franoux, Panayotis Tournikiotis, Eleni Stavroulaki, Christian Derouet, Ed. Musée Benaki, 2020
- Zervos and Cahiers d'art, Archives de la Bibliothèque Kandinsky, by Christian Derouet, Ed.Centre Georges Pompidou, 2011
- Index général de la revue Cahiers d'Art, 1926-1960, pref. Dora Vallier, Paris, Ed. Cahiers d'Art, 1981.
- The Art Press and Visual Culture in Paris during the Great Depression: Cahiers d'Art, Minotaure and Verve by Chara Kolokytha in: Visual Resources, An International Journal of Documentation 3, vol.29, Sept. 2013, pp. 184–215.
- Christian Zervos et Cahiers d'art, Archives de la Bibliothèque Kandinskyby Chara Kolokythain Konsthistorisk Tidskrift 4, vol. 82, 2013, pp. 339–342.
- Christian Zervos et Tériade: deux insulaires grecs à la conquête de l'avant-garde européenne par Jean-Pierre De Rycke, Paris - Athènes, 1863 - 1940, Pinacothèque Nationale et Musée Alexandros Soutzos. Athènes, 2006.
- Cahiers d'Art and the Evolution of Modernist Painting by Kim Grant,, The Journal of Modern Periodical Studies, v. 1, n. 2, 2010, pp. 216–227.
- Cahiers d'Art, Musée Zervos à Vézelay, sous la direction de Christian Derouet, Paris, Hazan, Perrigny, Conseil général de l'Yonne, DL 2006.
- Zervos, Picasso and Brassaï, ethnographers in the field: a critical collaboration by Christopher Green, in Malcolm Gee (ed.) Art criticism since 1900, Manchester, Dist. by St. Martin's, 1993.
- Le discours anthropologique dans l'art des années 1920-1930 en France, à travers l'exemple des Cahiers d'art by Valery Dupont, thèse, 1999, Art et Archéologie, Université de Dijon.
