= Journal of Modern Periodical Studies =

- Discipline: Literature, history
- Language: English
- Edited by: Mark Morrisson, Sean Latham

Publication details
- History: 2010-present
- Publisher: Penn State University Press (United States)
- Frequency: Biannually

Standard abbreviations
- ISO 4: J. Mod. Period. Stud.

Indexing
- ISSN: 1947-6574 (print); 2152-9272 (web)
- LCCN: 2009202442
- JSTOR: 19476574
- OCLC no.: 497826301

Links
- Journal homepage; Online access at Project MUSE

Journal of Modern Periodical Studies is a peer-reviewed academic journal covering the study of modern periodicals published between 1880 and 1950 in the English-speaking world. The journal was established in 2010 and is published twice a year by Penn State University Press.
