= List of French films of 1946 =

A list of films produced in France in 1946.

== A-L ==
Title	Director	Cast	Genre	Notes
120, Gare Street	Jacques Daniel-Norman	René Dary, Jean Parédès, Albert Dinan	Crime	
The Adventure of Cabassou	Gilles Grangier	Fernandel, Micheline Francey, André Fouché	Comedy	
The Angel They Gave Me	Jean Choux	Simone Renant, Jean Chevrier, Gabrielle Dorziat	Drama	
As Long as I Live	Jacques de Baroncelli	Edwige Feuillère, Jacques Berthier, Jean Debucourt	Drama	Co-production with Italy
Back Streets of Paris	Marcel Blistène	Françoise Rosay, Paul Meurisse, Simone Signoret	Crime	
The Battle of the Rails	René Clément	Marcel Barnault, Jacques Desagneaux, Jean Clarieux	Drama, War	
Beauty and the Beast	Jean Cocteau	Jean Marais, Josette Day, Mila Parély	Drama	Prix Louis Delluc
The Captain	Robert Vernay	Pierre Renoir, Claude Génia, Jean Pâqui	Historical	
Christine Gets Married	René Le Hénaff	Monique Rolland, Jean Murat, Huguette Duflos	Comedy	
Cyrano de Bergerac	Fernand Rivers	Claude Dauphin, Pierre Bertin, Michel Nastorg	Historical	
Dawn Devils	Yves Allégret	Georges Marchal, André Valmy, Jacqueline Pierreux	War drama	
Destiny	Richard Pottier	Tino Rossi, Micheline Francey, Mila Parély	Comedy drama	
Destiny Has Fun	Emil E. Reinert	André Claveau, Dany Robin, Robert Murzeau	Comedy	
Devil and the Angel	Pierre Chenal	Madeleine Sologne, Erich von Stroheim, Yves Vincent	Drama	
The Devil's Daughter	Henri Decoin	Pierre Fresnay, Fernand Ledoux	Crime	
Distress	Robert-Paul Dagan	Jules Berry, Suzy Carrier, Gabrielle Dorziat	Drama	
Dropped from Heaven	Emil E. Reinert	Jacqueline Gauthier, Claude Dauphin, Gisèle Pascal	Comedy	
The Eternal Husband	Pierre Billon	Raimu, Aimé Clariond, Gisèle Casadesus	Drama	
The Faceless Enemy	Maurice Cammage	Louise Carletti, Frank Villard, Jean Tissier	Crime	
A Friend Will Come Tonight	Raymond Bernard	Michel Simon, Madeleine Sologne, Paul Bernard	Drama	
Le Guardian	Jean de Marguenat	Tino Rossi, Lilia Vetti, Loleh Bellon	Drama	
Gates of the Night	Marcel Carné	Pierre Brasseur, Serge Reggiani, Yves Montand, Nathalie Nattier, Saturnin Fabre	Mystery	
Goodbye Darling	Raymond Bernard	Danielle Darrieux, Louis Salou, Gabrielle Dorziat	Drama	
The Grand Hotel Affair	André Hugon	Henri Alibert, Édouard Delmont, Noël Roquevert	Comedy mystery	
Gringalet	André Berthomieu	Charles Vanel, Marguerite Deval, Suzy Carrier	Comedy	
Happy Go Lucky	Marcel L'Herbier	Danielle Darrieux, André Luguet, François Périer	Comedy	
Her Final Role	Jean Gourguet	Gaby Morlay, Jean Debucourt, Marcel Dalio	Drama	
Hoboes in Paradise	René Le Hénaff	Raimu, Fernandel	Comedy	
The Ideal Couple	Raymond Rouleau	Hélène Perdrière, Denise Grey	Comedy	
The Idiot	Georges Lampin	Edwige Feuillère, Gérard Philipe	Historical drama	
Les J3	Roger Richebé	Gisèle Pascal, Saturnin Fabre	Comedy	
Jericho	Henri Calef	Nadine Alari, Paul Demange	War	
Land Without Stars	Georges Lacombe	Jany Holt, Gérard Philipe	Romance	
The Last Penny	André Cayatte	Ginette Leclerc, Gilbert Gil	Drama	
Lessons in Conduct	Gilles Grangier	Odette Joyeux, Gilbert Gil	Comedy	
A Lover's Return	Christian-Jaque	Louis Jouvet, Gaby Morlay	Drama	
Lunegarde	Marc Allégret	Gaby Morlay, Jean Tissier	Drama	

== M-Z ==
Title	Director	Cast	Genre	Notes
Madame et son flirt	Jean de Marguenat	Gisèle Pascal, Denise Grey	Comedy	
Martin Roumagnac	Georges Lacombe	Jean Gabin, Marlene Dietrich	Crime	
Mensonges	Jean Stelli	Gaby Morlay, Jean Marchat	Drama	
Messieurs Ludovic	Jean-Paul Le Chanois	Odette Joyeux, Bernard Blier, Marcel Herrand	Comedy drama	
The Misfortunes of Sophie	Jacqueline Audry	Marguerite Moreno, Michel Auclair	Comedy drama	
Monsieur Grégoire Escapes	Jacques Daniel-Norman	Bernard Blier, Yvette Lebon, Jules Berry	Comedy	
Mr. Orchid	René Clément	Noël-Noël, Maurice Chevit	Drama	
The Murderer is Not Guilty	René Delacroix	Albert Préjean, Jacqueline Gauthier	Crime	
Night Warning	Léon Mathot	Hélène Perdrière, Roger Pigaut	War drama	
Not So Stupid	André Berthomieu	Bourvil, Suzy Carrier	Comedy	
Once is Enough	Andrée Feix	Edwige Feuillère, Fernand Gravey	Comedy	
Partie de campagne	Jean Renoir	Sylvia Bataille, Georges D'Arnoux	Romantic drama (short)	
Pastoral Symphony	Jean Delannoy	Pierre Blanchar, Michèle Morgan, Jean Desailly	Drama	
Patrie	Louis Daquin	Pierre Blanchar, Maria Mauban	Historical	
Pétrus	Marc Allegret	Fernandel, Simone Simon, Marcel Dalio	Comedy crime	
The Queen's Necklace	Marcel L'Herbier	Viviane Romance, Maurice Escande	Historical	
Raboliot	Jacques Daroy	Julien Bertheau, Blanchette Brunoy	Drama	
The Revenge of Roger	André Cayatte	Lucien Coëdel, María Casares	Historical crime	
Roger la Honte	André Cayatte	Lucien Coëdel, María Casares	Historical	
Rooster Heart	Maurice Cloche	Fernandel, Jean Témerson	Comedy	
The Sea Rose	Jacques de Baroncelli	Denise Bosc, Fernand Ledoux	Drama	
Solita de Cordoue	Willy Rozier	Alain Cuny, Blanchette Brunoy, Édouard Delmont	Drama	
Son of France	Pierre Blondy	Jean Mercanton, Jimmy Gaillard	Drama	
Song of the Clouds	André Cayatte	Tino Rossi, Jacqueline Gauthier	Comedy	
The Soup Boat	Maurice Gleize	Charles Vanel, Lucienne Laurence, Alfred Adam	Drama	
Special Mission	Maurice de Canonge	Jany Holt, Pierre Renoir	Thriller	
Star Without Light	Marcel Blistène	Édith Piaf, Marcel Herrand	Drama musical	
Strange Fate	Louis Cuny	Renée Saint-Cyr, Aimé Clariond	Drama	
Sylvie and the Ghost	Claude Autant-Lara	Odette Joyeux, François Périer, Pierre Larquey	Romantic comedy	
The Temptation of Barbizon	Jean Stelli	Simone Renant, François Périer, Pierre Larquey	Comedy	
That's Not the Way to Die	Jean Boyer	Erich von Stroheim, Anne-Marie Blanc, Denise Vernac	Crime	
The Visitor	Jean Dréville	Pierre Fresnay, Antoine Balpêtré, Jean Debucourt	Drama	
We Are Not Married	Bernard-Roland, Gianni Pons	Claude Dauphin, Loris Gizzi	Comedy	
Women's Games	Maurice Cloche	Jacques Dumesnil, Hélène Perdrière	Comedy	

== See also ==
- 1946 in France
