= Roger la Honte =

Roger la Honte may refer to:

- Roger la Honte (novel), novel by Jules Mary

Films based on the novel:

- Roger la Honte (1913 film), French silent film directed by Adrien Caillard
- Roger la Honte (1922 film), French silent film directed by Jacques de Baroncelli
- Roger la Honte (1933 film), French film directed by Gaston Roudès
- Roger la Honte (1946 film), French film adaptation directed by André Cayatte
- Trap for the Assassin, 1966 French-Italian film known in French as Roger la Honte

== See also ==
- The Revenge of Roger
