= Jacques Companeez =

Russian screenwriter (1906–1956)

- Born: 5 March 1906
- Died: 15 September 1956 (aged 50); Paris (France)
- Occupation: Screenwriter

Jacques Companeez (Russian: Яков Компанеец, Yaakov Kompanéyets, born in Nizhyn, Russian Empire 1906–1956) was a Russian Jewish émigré screenwriter in Paris.

He arrived in Paris in 1936 after studying in Berlin, and wrote 80 screenplays, one of his first being co-writing Les Bas-fonds for Jean Renoir (1936). His older daughter is the contralto Irène Companeez, who recorded with Maria Callas and was married to Italian baritone Dino Dondi. His younger daughter Nina Companeez was also a screenwriter.

== Selected screenplays ==
- A Thousand for One Night (1933)
- In the Service of the Tsar (1936)
- The Lower Depths (Les Bas-fonds), directed by Jean Renoir (1936)
- Feu!, directed by Jacques de Baroncelli (1937)
- The Alibi, directed by Pierre Chenal (1937)
- The Cheat (1937)
- Princess Tarakanova, directed by Fedor Ozep (1938)
- La Maison du Maltais, directed by Pierre Chenal (1938)
- Katia, directed by Maurice Tourneur (1938)
- Gibraltar, directed by Fedor Ozep (1938)
- I Was an Adventuress (1938)
- The Postmaster's Daughter (1938)
- Personal Column, directed by Robert Siodmak (1939)
- The Emigrant (1940)
- Serenade, directed by Jean Boyer (1940)
- A Woman in the Night (1943)
- The Inevitable Monsieur Dubois (1943)
- Florence Is Crazy (1944)
- Secret Documents (1945)
- As Long as I Live, directed by Jacques de Baroncelli (1946)
- A Friend Will Come Tonight, directed by Raymond Bernard (1946)
- Impasse, directed by Pierre Dard (1946)
- Devil and the Angel (1946), directed by Pierre Chenal (1946)
- Goodbye Darling, directed by Raymond Bernard (1946)
- Counter Investigation, directed by Jean Faurez (1947)
- Copie conforme, directed by Jean Dréville (1947)
- The Damned, directed by René Clément (1947)
- Monsieur Wens Holds the Trump Cards, directed by Emile-Georges De Meyst (1947)
- A Cop (1947)
- Gunman in the Streets, directed by Frank Tuttle (1950)
- The Man from Jamaica, directed by Maurice de Canonge (1950)
- Casque d'Or, directed by Jacques Becker (1952)
- Adorable Creatures, directed by Christian-Jaque (1952)
- Pleasures of Paris (1952)
- Full House, directed by Henri Verneuil (1952)
- Forbidden Fruit, directed by Henri Verneuil (1952)
- Jeunes Mariés, directed by Gilles Grangier (1953)
- Les Compagnes de la nuit, directed by Ralph Habib (1953)
- Tempest in the Flesh, directed by Ralph Habib (1954)
- It's the Paris Life (1954)
- Orient Express (1954)
- Queen Margot, directed by Jean Dréville (1954)
- The Lovers of Lisbon, directed by Henri Verneuil (1955)
- The Blue Danube (1955)
- Blackmail (1955)
- Scandal in Montmartre (1955)
- Stopover in Orly (1955)
- Nagana (1955)
- La Sorcière, directed by André Michel (1956)
- Women's Club, directed by Ralph Habib (1956)
- Folies-Bergère, directed by Henri Decoin (1957)
- I'll Get Back to Kandara, directed by Victor Vicas (1957)
- The Seventh Commandment (1957)
