= Gilbert Cesbron =

French writer

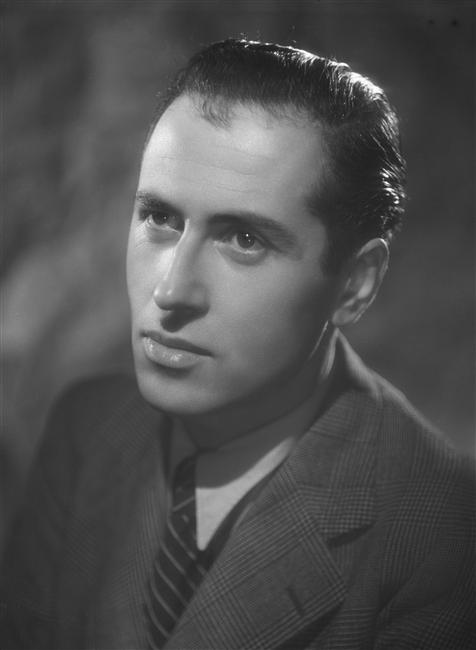
Gilbert Cesbron in 1947

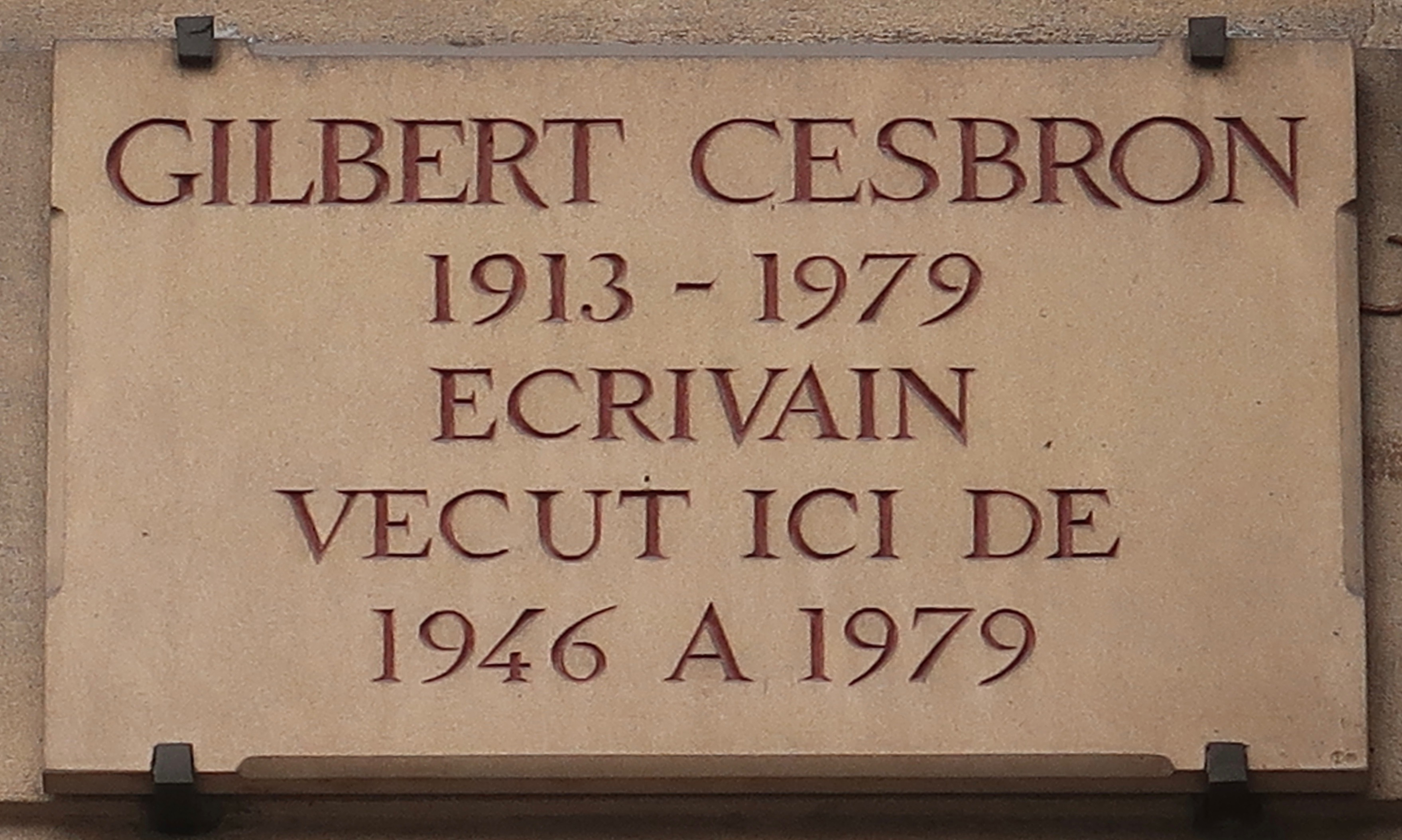
Commemorative plaque at 126 Boulevard Saint-Germain, 6th arrondissement of Paris, where Gilbert Cesbron lived from 1946 to 1979.

Gilbert Cesbron (13 January 1913, Paris – 12 August 1979, Paris) was a French novelist.

== Biography ==
Gilbert Cesbron (13 January 1913, Paris – 12 August 1979, Paris) was a French novelist. Born in Paris, Cesbron attended what is now known as Lycée Condorcet. In 1944 he published his first novel, Les innocents de Paris ("The Innocent of Paris"), in Switzerland. He first achieved wide public acclaim with the publication of Notre prison est un royaume ("Our Prison is a Kingdom") in 1948 and Il est minuit, docteur Schweitzer ("It is midnight, Doctor Schweitzer") in 1950.

In his works Cesbron tended to illustrate and describe relevant social topics such as juvenile delinquency in Chiens perdus sans collier ("Lost Dogs Without Collars"), violence in Entre chiens et loups ("Between Dogs and Wolves"), euthanasia in Il est plus tard que tu ne penses ("It is Later than You Think") and working priests in Les Saints vont en enfer ("Saints in Hell").

In 1955, Cesbron's book Chiens perdus sans collier, the story of an orphan boy and a benevolent judge, was made into a movie starring Jean Gabin and Robert Dalban.

He died on 12 August 1979 at his home at 126 Boulevard Saint-Germain in the 6th arrondissement of Paris. He is buried in Bourré, Loir-et-Cher. His widow, Dominique, died in 2003.

== Works ==
=== Novels ===
- Les Innocents de Paris, 1944.
- On croit rêver (1945).
- La Tradition Fontquernie (1947).
- Notre prison est un royaume (1948).
- La Souveraine (1949).
- Bois mort où l'oiseau chante (1950).
- Les saints vont en enfer (1952).
- Chiens perdus sans collier (1954).
- Vous verrez le ciel ouvert (1956).
- Il est plus tard que tu ne penses (1958).
- Avoir été (1960).
- Entre chiens et loups (1962).
- Une abeille contre la vitre (1964).
- C’est Mozart qu’on assassine (1966).
- Je suis mal dans ta peau (1969).
- Voici le temps des imposteurs (1972).
- Don Juan en automne (1975).
- Mais moi je vous aimais (1977).
- Compagnons de la nuit (1938, published in 1995).

=== Tales and short stories ===
- D’Outremonde (23 tales), (1949).
- Traduit du vent (1951).
- Tout dort et je veille (1959).
- La Ville couronnée d’épines (1964).
- Des enfants aux cheveux gris (1968).
- Un vivier sans eau (1979).
- Leur pesant d’écume (1980);
- Tant d’amour perdu (1981).

=== Essays ===
- Chasseur maudit (1953).
- Ce siècle appelle au secours (1955).
- Libérez Barabbas (1957).
- Une sentinelle attend l’aurore (1965).
- Lettre ouverte à une jeune fille morte (1968).
- Ce que je crois (1970).
- Des leçons d’abîme (1971).
- Mourir étonné (1976);
- Huit paroles pour l’éternité (1978).
- Passé un certain âge (1980).
- La regarder en face (1982).

=== Plays ===
- Il est minuit, docteur Schweitzer (1952)
- Briser la statue (1952), raconte la vie de Sainte Thérèse de Lisieux.
- L’Homme seul (1961).
- Phèdre à Colombes (1961).
- Dernier Acte (1961).
- Mort le premier (1970).
- Pauvre Philippe (1970)

=== Other ===
- Torrent (poèmes) (1934).
- Les Petits des Hommes (album de photos avec texte) (1954).
- Il suffit d’aimer (récit de la vie de Sainte Bernadette Soubirous (1960).
- Journal sans date (tome 1) (1963).
- Journal sans date, (tome 2). Tant qu’il fait jour (1967).
- Journal sans date, (tome 3). Un miroir en miettes (1973);
- Merci l’oiseau ! (poèmes) (1976);
- Ce qu’on appelle vivre (interviewed by the journalist Maurice Chavardès)(1977).
- Bonheur de rien (1979).
- Un désespoir allègre (1983).

== Adaptations ==
=== Films ===
- 1952 : Il est minuit, Docteur Schweitzer, director André Haguet, with Jean Debucourt, Pierre Fresnay, Jeanne Moreau, Jean Lanier.
- 1955 : Chiens perdus sans collier, director Jean Delannoy, with Jean Gabin, Robert Dalban, Jean-Jacques Delbo.
- 1960 : Il suffit d'aimer, director Robert Darène, script and dialogue Gilbert Cesbron, with Madeleine Sologne, music Maurice Thiriet.

=== Television ===
- 1959 : Ruf ohne Echo, director Rainer Wolffhardt, with Horst Tappert, Hans Christian Blech.
- 1962 : Il est minuit, Docteur Schweitzer, director Gilbert Pineau.
- 1977 : C’est Mozart qu’on assassine, director Pierre Goutas, with Cyril Brisse, Henri Garcin, Catherine Rich, Louis Seigner.
- 1979 : Avoir été, director Roland-Bernard.
