= Renée Faure =

French actress (1918–2005)

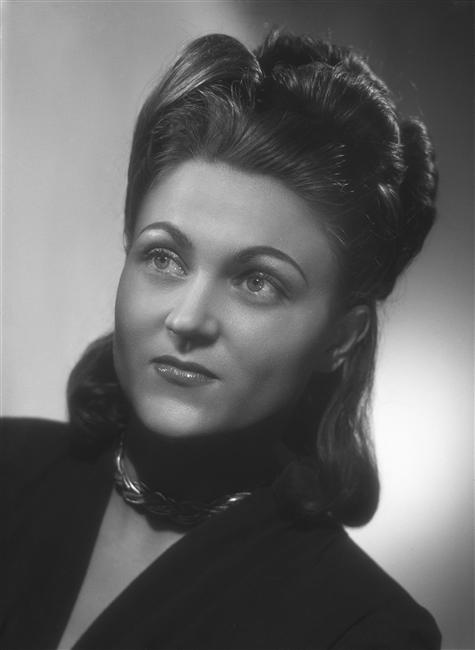
- Faure in 1948
- Born: Reneé Paule Nanine Faure; 4 November 1918; Paris, France
- Died: 2 May 2005 (aged 86); Clamart, France
- Occupation: Actress
- Years active: 1938–1998
- Spouse(s): Renaud Mary Christian-Jaque (m. 1947; div. 1953)
- Children: 1

Renée Faure (born Reneé Paule Nanine Faure; 4 November 1918 – 2 May 2005) was a French stage and film actress.

== Early life ==
Renée Faure was born Reneé Paule Nanine Faure on 4 November 1918 in Paris, France. Her father was René Faure, director of the Lariboisière Hospital in Paris.

A student of René Simon and André Brunot, Faure joined to the Comédie-Française, as a boarder on 1937, before being appointed member, on 1942. She then performed in major repertoire pieces, particularly excelling in the theater by Marivaux and Musset.

== Career ==
In 1941, she made her film debut in L'Assassinat du père Noël , the first film produced by Continental Films, in which she plays the daughter of Harry Baur.

Her following performances confirmed her qualities as an interpreter, quickly passing from angelic roles Angels of Sin (1943) to those, otherwise more ambiguous, of passionate woman such as in François Villon (1945), Torrents (1947), and Bel Ami (1955). She quickly shared the bill with the stars of the time, playing three times with Jean Gabin (The President, 1961).

Faure was a jury member during the 1953 Cannes Film Festival.

She left the Comédie-Française on 1964. Almost immediately, on 1965, the institution paid homage to Faure by raising her to the rank of honorary member, which enabled her to return to play, twenty-two years later, the role of the first prioress, in Dialogue of the Carmelites (play) by Georges Bernanos, in 1987.

The following decade saw the actress devote herself to television and the theater. Known to the general public through successful series such as Les Gens de Mogador or Maigret , the actress only appears from far and wide on the big screen, playing with her deep voice and her graceful demeanor in "The Judge and the Assassin", by Bertrand Tavernier, alongside Philippe Noiret and Michel Galabru. In 1988, Claude Miller distributed it in the role of the matriarch of "La Petite Voleuse" facing the young Charlotte Gainsbourg.

In the 1990s, Renée Faure slowed down her activity, nevertheless appearing in À la vitesse d'un cheval au galop (1992) and L'inconnu dans la maison (1992), remake of the film directed by Henri Decoin in 1941, the year of her film debut.

== Personal life ==
Faure married French actor Renaud Mary and they had one child. She later divorced him and later married director Christian-Jaque, who had directed her film debut. The couple worked together three more times in: The Bellman (1945), La Chartreuse de Parme (1948) and Adorables Créatures (1952) before divorcing in 1953.

== Death ==
Faure died on 2 May 2005 in Clamart, France, at the age of 86.

== Filmography ==
- 1941: L'Assassinat du père Noël (by Christian-Jaque) - Catherine Cornusse
- 1942: Prince Charming (by Jean Boyer) - Rosine
- 1943: Des jeunes filles dans la nuit (by René Le Hénaff) - Mademoiselle Barfleur
- 1943: Les Anges du péché (by Robert Bresson) - Anne-Marie Lamaury
- 1944: Behold Beatrice (by Jean de Marguenat) - Béatrice
- 1945: François Villon (by André Zwoboda) - Catherine de Vauselles
- 1945: The Bellman (by Christian-Jaque) - Catherine Fabret
- 1946: The Great Dawn -La Grande Aurore (by Giuseppe Maria Scotese) - Anna Gamba
- 1947: Torrents (by Serge de Poligny) - Sigrid
- 1948: La Chartreuse de Parme (by Christian-Jaque) - Clelia Conti
- 1948: The Shadow (by André Berthomieu) - Denise Fournier
- 1950: One Only Loves Once (by Jean Stelli) - Danièle de Bolestac
- 1952: Adorables Créatures (by Christian-Jaque) - Alice
- 1953: Koenigsmark (by Solange Térac) - Mélusine de Graffendried
- 1954: Rasputin (by Georges Combret) - Véra
- 1955: Bel Ami (by Louis Daquin) - Madeleine Forestier
- 1956: Blood to the Head (by Gilles Grangier) - Mademoiselle
- 1958: White Cargo (by Georges Lacombe) - Mme Ploit
- 1959: Rue des prairies (by Denys de La Patellière) - Me Surville
- 1961: Le Président (by Henri Verneuil) - Mademoiselle Milleran
- 1966: Les Sultans (by Jean Delannoy) - Odette Messager
- 1974: Madame Bovary (by Pierre Cardinal) (TV Movie) - Mme Bovary, mère
- 1976: The Judge and the Assassin (by Bertrand Tavernier) - Mme. Rousseau
- 1979: Un Neveu silencieux (by Robert Enrico) (TV Series) - Mme Verrière
- 1982: Ombre et secrets (by Philippe Delabre) (Short)
- 1985: L'Amour en douce (by Edouard Molinaro) - Tante Thérèse
- 1988: The Little Thief (by Claude Miller) - Mère Busato
- 1989: Dédé (by Jean-Louis Benoît) - the grand mother
- 1992: À la vitesse d'un cheval au galop (by Fabien Onteniente) - Odette Courcel
- 1992: L'Inconnu dans la maison (by Georges Lautner) - Fine
- 1997: La Vie intérieure (by Eddy Geradon-Luyckx)
- 1998: Homère, la dernière odyssée (by Fabio Carpi) - Eugénie
