= A Friend Will Come Tonight =

1946 film directed by Raymond Bernard

- Directed by: Raymond Bernard
- Written by: Jacques Companéez; Yvan Noé; Raymond Bernard
- Produced by: Constantin Geftman; Jacques Roitfeld; Raymond Artus
- Starring: Michel Simon; Madeleine Sologne; Paul Bernard
- Cinematography: Robert Lefebvre
- Edited by: Charlotte Guilbert
- Music by: Arthur Honegger
- Production companies: Francinex; CGC; Les Productions Jacques Roitfeld
- Distributed by: Francinex
- Release date: 10 April 1946
- Running time: 125 minutes
- Country: France
- Language: French

A Friend Will Come Tonight (French: Un ami viendra ce soir) is a 1946 French drama film directed by Raymond Bernard and starring Michel Simon, Madeleine Sologne and Paul Bernard. The film's sets were designed by the art director Robert Gys.

== Cast ==
- Michel Simon as Michel Lemaret
- Madeleine Sologne as Hélène Asselin
- Paul Bernard as Le docteur Maurice Tiller
- Louis Salou as Le commissaire Louis Martin
- Saturnin Fabre as Philippe Prunier
- Marcel André as Le docteur Lestrade
- Lily Mounet as Alexandrine Jeanne Constance Létitia, baronne de Pontignac
- Yvette Andréyor as Mademoiselle Béatrice
- Jacques Clancy as Jacques Leroy, le pianiste
- Daniel Gélin as Pierre Ribault
- Claude Lehmann as Le docteur Pigaut
- Cécilia Paroldi as Claire, la postière
- Howard Vernon as Robert Langlois, le muet
- Jane Marny as Madame Belin
- Raoul Marco as Le maire
- Pierre Sergeol as Charles Levallier
- Odette Barencey as Une serveuse de l'auberge
- Georges Brisset
- Claude Vernier as Le second officier allemand
- Gregori Chmara as L'officier allemand au monocle
- Paul Darcy
- Jo Dest as Un allemand
- Palmyre Levasseur as Une villageoise
- Fernand Liesse as Anselme
- Darling Légitimus
- Maria Mauban
- Fritz Schmiedel as Le soldat allemand faisant l'appel
- Maurice Schutz

== Production ==
Guy Lefranc was assistant director on the movie.

== Bibliography ==
- Rège, Philippe. Encyclopedia of French Film Directors, Volume 1. Scarecrow Press, 2009.
