= Folies-Bergère =

Folies-Bergère may refer to:

- Folies Bergère, a theatre in Paris
- Folies Bergère (1935 film)
- Folies-Bergère (1957 film)
- Folies-Bergère, original name of a Broadway theatre in New York City later named Fulton Theatre
