= Under the Cards =

1948 film

- Directed by: André Cayatte
- Written by: André Cayatte; Louis Chavance; Hélène Mercier; Charles Spaak
- Starring: Madeleine Sologne; Serge Reggiani; Paul Meurisse
- Cinematography: Lucienne Chevert
- Edited by: René Le Hénaff
- Production company: Flaminia-Films
- Distributed by: Gray-Films
- Release date: 22 September 1948
- Running time: 90 minutes
- Country: France
- Language: French

Under the Cards (French: Le dessous des cartes) is a 1948 French crime film directed by André Cayatte and starring Madeleine Sologne, Serge Reggiani and Paul Meurisse. The story is loosely based on the Stavisky Affair of the 1930s. A separate Italian-language version Manù il contrabbandiere was also produced.

The film's sets were designed by the art director René Moulaert.

== Cast ==
- Madeleine Sologne as Florence Géraudy
- Serge Reggiani as Manu
- Paul Meurisse as Inspecteur Nansen
- Enrico Glori as Claude Géraudy
- René Bourbon as Docteur Pierre
- Léonce Corne as Le juge
- Paul Faivre as Le maire
- André Carnège as Welford
- Gabrielle Fontan as La mère de Florence
- Paul Demange as Le speaker
- René Blancard as Le brigadier
- Édouard Delmont as L'aubergiste
- Janine Darcey as Fine

== Bibliography ==
- Crisp, C.G. The Classic French Cinema, 1930-1960. Indiana University Press, 1993.
