= The Loves of Colette =

1948 film

- Directed by: Jean Faurez
- Written by: Henri Jeanson; René Wheeler
- Produced by: André Halley des Fontaines; Robert Lavallée; Raoul Ploquin
- Starring: François Périer; Colette Richard; Louis Salou
- Cinematography: Louis Page
- Edited by: Suzanne de Troeye
- Music by: Georges Van Parys
- Production companies: Les Films Raoul Ploquin; Union Générale Cinématographique
- Distributed by: L'Alliance Générale de Distribution Cinématographique
- Release date: 14 April 1948
- Running time: 96 minutes
- Country: France
- Language: French

The Loves of Colette (French: La Vie en rose) is a 1948 French drama film directed by Jean Faurez and starring François Périer, Colette Richard and Louis Salou. The film's sets were designed by the art director René Moulaert. The French title shares its name with the song La Vie en rose by Edith Piaf.

== Synopsis ==
Francois, a teacher at a provincial college is in love with Colette, the principal's daughter. However, he has a rival for her affections.

== Cast ==
- François Périer as François Lecoc
- Colette Richard as Colette
- Louis Salou as Robert Turlot
- Simone Valère as Simone
- François Patrice as Della Rocca
- Serge Emrich as Plancoët
- Jacques Mercier as Poupaud
- Marina de Berg as La bonne
- Emile Chopitel as L'aubergiste
- Pierre Moncorbier as Un professeur
- Eugène Yvernès as Un professeur
- Jean Berton as Un professeur
- Sylvain as Le garçon d'honneur
- Jacques Ory as Un élève
- Robert Le Fort as Le porteur
- Jacqueline Beyrot as La mariée
- Claire Olivier as Madame Palisse
- Gustave Gallet as Monsieur Palisse

== Bibliography ==
- Bessy, Maurice & Chirat, Raymond. Histoire du cinéma français: encyclopédie des films, 1940–1950. Pygmalion, 1986
- Burch, Noël & Sellier, Geneviève. The Battle of the Sexes in French Cinema, 1930–1956. Duke University Press, 2013.
- Rège, Philippe. Encyclopedia of French Film Directors, Volume 1. Scarecrow Press, 2009.
