= Katia (film) =

1938 film directed by Maurice Tourneur

- Directed by: Maurice Tourneur
- Written by: Jean-Jacques Bernard; Jacques Companéez
- Produced by: Louis d'Hee
- Starring: Danielle Darrieux
- Cinematography: Robert Lefebvre
- Edited by: Roger Mercanton
- Music by: Wal Berg
- Production company: Metropa Films
- Distributed by: Cando-Film (1949) (Austria); Arthur Mayer & Joseph Burstyn (US)
- Release dates: 7 November 1938 (Paris); 22 December 1939 (US)
- Running time: 89 minutes
- Country: France
- Language: French

Katia is a 1938 French historical drama film starring Danielle Darrieux. The movie was directed by Maurice Tourneur, based on novel Princesse Mathe Bibesco by Marthe Bibesco under the pseudonym Lucile Decaux. It tells the love affair of Russian princess and Czar Alexander II.

It was remade in 1959 with the same title, which starred Romy Schneider.

== Cast ==
- Danielle Darrieux as Katia Dolgoroukov
- John Loder as Le tsar Alexandre II
- Marie-Hélène Dasté as La Tsarine
- Aimé Clariond as Le Comte Schouwaloff
- Marcel Carpentier as Le général Potapoff
- Raymond Aimos as Anatole - l'ouvrier parisien
- Georges Prieur as Le chambellan
- Thérèse Dorny as La baronne
- Marcelle Praince as La grande-duchesse
- Jacques Erwin as Troubetzkoï
- André Carnège as Le grand-duc
- Pierre Labry as Le sergent de police
- Georges Flateau as L'empereur Napoléon III
- Génia Vaury as L'impératrice Eugénie
- Jacqueline Dhomont as Une élève du pensionnat
- Anthony Gildès as Un dignitaire
- Paul Marthès as L'ambassadeur turc
- Robert Seller as Un consommateur
- André Varennes as Ivanoff
- Paul Demange as Un consommateur
- André Numès Fils as Un consommateur
- Georges Douking as L'espion
- Paul Escoffier as Le médecin
- Eddy Debray as Louis - le terroriste
- Marthe Mellot as Une surveillante du pensionnat
- Ginette d'Yd as Une dame d'honneur
- Ariane Pathé as Une élève du pensionnat
- Marie-Claire as Une élève du pensionnat
- Germaine Michel as Sidonie
- Marcel Simon as Le prince Dolgorouky
- Charlotte Lysès as La directrice du pensionnat
- Jeanne Provost as Mademoiselle Trépeau
