= Tempest in the Flesh =

- Theatrical release poster
- Directed by: Ralph Habib
- Written by: Jean-Claude Aurel; Jacques Companeez; Jacques Natanson (dialogue); Paul Andréota (adaptation)
- Produced by: Hugo Benedek; Jacques Gauthier
- Starring: Françoise Arnoul; Raymond Pellegrin; Philippe Lemaire; Jean-Claude Pascal
- Cinematography: Roger Hubert
- Music by: Norbert Glanzberg
- Production companies: EGC; Del Duca Films; PEC
- Distributed by: Les Films Corona
- Release date: 5 February 1954
- Running time: 95 minutes
- Country: France
- Language: French

La Rage au corps (US title: Tempest in the Flesh, UK title: Fire in the Blood) is a 1954 French drama film directed by Ralph Habib, based on story by Jean-Claude Aurel and Jacques Companéez. The film tells the story of a nymphomaniac, who would be saved only by really falling in love. It was filmed on location at the Pyrenees Mountains, Hautes-Pyrénées, France.

== Main characters ==
- Françoise Arnoul as Clara
- Raymond Pellegrin as Antonio "Tonio" Borelli
- Philippe Lemaire as Andre
- Jean-Claude Pascal as Gino
