= The Wolf of the Malveneurs =

1943 film

- Directed by: Guillaume Radot
- Written by: Jean Féline; Francis Vincent-Bréchignac
- Produced by: André Mallet; Guillaume Radot
- Starring: Madeleine Sologne; Pierre Renoir; Gabrielle Dorziat
- Cinematography: Pierre Montazel
- Edited by: Émilienne Nelissen
- Music by: Maurice Thiriet; Marceau Van Hoorebecke
- Production company: Union Technique Cinematographique
- Distributed by: La Société des Films Sirius
- Release date: 10 March 1943
- Running time: 99 minutes
- Country: France
- Language: French

The Wolf of the Malveneurs (French: Le loup des Malveneur) is a 1943 French mystery horror film directed by Guillaume Radot and starring Madeleine Sologne, Pierre Renoir and Gabrielle Dorziat. It was shot at the Cité Elgé studios in Paris with location shooting at the Château d'Anjony in Tournemire. The film's sets were designed by the art director Marcel Magniez. It is Gothic in style with use of chiaroscuro lighting. It was part of a group of films produced in German-occupied France that used fantasy or historical costume settings to subtly express dissent.

== Synopsis ==
The Malveneur family live at the same gloomy, isolated castle in the countryside they have held for centuries. The current owner Reginald de Malveneur strongly believes in an ancient curse that turned one of his ancestors into a werewolf. As he has only a daughter rather than a son he will be the last of the line, unless his obsessive scientific experiments in his laboratory bear fruit. A young governess arrives from Paris to educate Malveneur's daughter. When both Malveneur, his gamekeeper and his wife disappear or die within weeks of each other, the governess join forces with a young painter to investigate the mystery.

== Cast ==
- Madeleine Sologne as Monique Valory
- Pierre Renoir as Reginald de Malveneur
- Gabrielle Dorziat as Magda
- Michel Marsay as Philippe
- Marie Olinska as Estelle Malveneur
- Marcelle Géniat as Marianne
- Louis Salou as Dr. Andrieu
- Yves Furet as Firmin
- Jo Dervo as Dr. Giraud
- Henri Charrett as Le Garde-Chasse
- Bijou as Geneviève

== Bibliography ==
- Bertin-Maghit, Jean Pierre. Le cinéma français sous Vichy: les films français de 1940 à 1944. Revue du Cinéma Albatros, 1980.
- Deighan, Samm. The Legacy of World War II in European Arthouse Cinema. McFarland, 2021.
- Hutchings, Peter. The A to Z of Horror Cinema. Scarecrow Press, 2009.
