= A Cop (1947 film) =

1947 film

- Directed by: Maurice de Canonge
- Written by: Jacques Companéez; Michel Duran
- Produced by: Lucien Masson
- Starring: Lucien Coëdel; Suzy Carrier; Raymond Pellegrin
- Cinematography: Georges Million
- Edited by: Monique Kirsanoff
- Music by: Louiguy
- Production company: La Société des Films Sirius
- Distributed by: La Société des Films Sirius
- Release date: 3 December 1947
- Running time: 94 minutes
- Country: France
- Language: French

A Cop (French: Un flic) is a 1947 French crime film directed by Maurice de Canonge and starring Lucien Coëdel, Suzy Carrier and Raymond Pellegrin. It was shot at the Photosonor Studios in Courbevoie on the outskirts of Paris. The film's sets were designed by the art director Robert Dumesnil.

== Cast ==
- Lucien Coëdel as L'inspecteur Renaud - de la P.J.
- Suzy Carrier as Josette
- Raymond Pellegrin as Georges Monnier
- Michèle Martin as Mme Renaud
- Jean-Jacques Delbo as Zattore
- Geymond Vital as Daniel
- Maurice Salabert as Un inspecteur
- André Wasley as Marcel
- Robert Noël as Ernest Baudoin
- Albert Michel as Albert
- Henri Cogan as Un homme de Zattore
- Jacques Gencel as Pierrot
- Gaby Bruyère as Ginette
- Thomy Bourdelle as Un inspecteur
- Louis Florencie as Sacq
- Albert Dinan as Bouthillon
- Léo Lapara as Un inspecteur

== Bibliography ==
- Phillips, Alastair. Rififi: French Film Guide. Bloomsbury Publishing, 2009.
- Rège, Philippe. Encyclopedia of French Film Directors, Volume 1. Scarecrow Press, 2009.
