= Sideral Cruises =

1942 film

- Directed by: André Zwobada
- Based on: Pierre Guerlais; Pierre Bost
- Produced by: Pierre Guerlais
- Starring: Madeleine Sologne; Jean Marchat; Julien Carette
- Cinematography: Jean Isnard
- Edited by: Raymond Lamy
- Music by: Georges Van Parys
- Production company: Industrie Cinématographique
- Distributed by: L'Alliance Cinématographique Moderne
- Release date: 29 April 1942
- Running time: 95 minutes
- Country: France
- Language: French

Sideral Cruises (French: Croisières sidérales) is a 1942 French science fiction adventure film directed by André Zwobada and starring Madeleine Sologne, Jean Marchat and Julien Carette. It was shot at the Epinay Studios of Eclair outside Paris. The film's sets were designed by the art director Henri Mahé.

== Cast ==
- Madeleine Sologne as Françoise Monier
- Jean Marchat as Robert Monier
- Julien Carette as Lucien Marchand
- Robert Arnoux as Le banquier Antoine
- Simone Allain as Béatrice
- Auguste Bovério as Le directeur
- Violette Briet as Marie
- Jean Dasté as Pépin
- Luce Ferrald as Gaby
- Richard Francoeur as Charles
- Paul Frankeur as Le premier bonimenteur
- Tony Jacquot as Le jeune marié
- Georges Jamin as Gustave
- Guita Karen as La vénusienne
- Serge Laroche as Philippe
- Hubert de Malet as Le vénusien
- Marcel Maupi as Le policier
- Jean Morel as Le commandant
- Philippe Olive as Le deuxième bonimenteur
- Paul Ollivier as L'oncle
- Suzanne Dantès as Camille
- Suzanne Dehelly as Georgette Marchand
- Bourvil as Un scientifique
- Alfred Adam as Le décorateur
- Erno Crisa as L'homme sur le manège
- Jacques Dufilho as Un bûcheron
- René Lacourt as Un bûcheron

== Bibliography ==
- Leahy, Sarah & Vanderschelden, Isabelle. Screenwriters in French cinema. Manchester University Press, 2021.
- Leteux, Christine. Continental Films: French Cinema under German Control. University of Wisconsin Press, 2022.
- Rège, Philippe. Encyclopedia of French Film Directors, Volume 1. Scarecrow Press, 2009.
- Siclier, Jacques. La France de Pétain et son cinéma. H. Veyrier, 1981.
