= Pierre Montazel =

French cinematographer and screenwriter

Pierre Montazel (5 March 1911 – 8 September 1975) was a French cinematographer and screenwriter.

== Selected filmography ==
- My Aunt the Dictator (1939)
- Vidocq (1939)
- Sing Anyway (1940)
- The Pavilion Burns (1941)
- The Wolf of the Malveneurs (1943)
- Majestic Hotel Cellars (1945)
- Devil and the Angel (1946)
- Six Hours to Lose (1947)
- Counter Investigation (1947)
- Antoine and Antoinette (1947)
- Cruise for the Unknown One (1948)
- I Like Only You (1949)
- Not Any Weekend for Our Love (1950)
- Paris Still Sings (1951)
- Judgement of God (1952)
- Touchez pas au grisbi (1954)
- Royal Affairs in Versailles (1954)
- Gas-Oil (1955)
- The Little Rebels (1955)
- I'll Get Back to Kandara (1956)
- Charming Boys (1957)
- Folies-Bergère (1957)
- Anyone Can Kill Me (1957)
- Burning Fuse (1957)
- The Cat (1958)
- Guinguette (1959)
- Du rififi chez les femmes (1959)
- The Cat Shows Her Claws (1960)
- The Troops on Vacation (1970)
