= Blackmail (1955 film) =

1955 film

- Directed by: Guy Lefranc
- Written by: Paul Andréota; Jacques Companéez; Jacques Marcerou
- Produced by: Hugo Benedek; Jean-Jacques Vital; Robert Woog
- Starring: Raymond Pellegrin; Magali Noël; Leo Genn
- Cinematography: Marcel Grignon
- Edited by: Monique Kirsanoff
- Music by: Norbert Glanzberg
- Production companies: Metzger et Woog; Simoja
- Distributed by: Les Films Corona
- Release date: 19 October 1955
- Running time: 98 minutes
- Country: France
- Language: French

Blackmail (French: Chantage) is a 1955 French crime film directed by Guy Lefranc and starring Raymond Pellegrin, Magali Noël and Leo Genn. It was shot at the Billancourt Studios in Paris and on location around the city including in Saint-Germain-en-Laye. The film's sets were designed by the art director Lucien Aguettand. It is also known by the alternative title The Lowest Crime.

== Cast ==
- Raymond Pellegrin as Jean-Louis Labouret
- Magali Noël as Denise Brisse
- Leo Genn as Lionel Kendall
- Georges Chamarat as Edouard Brisse
- Noël Roquevert as Boussardel
- Michel Etcheverry as Le commissaire Bretrannet
- Madeleine Barbulée as L'infirmière
- Henri Nassiet as Maître Rougier - l'avocat d'Edouard Brisse
- Nadine Tallier as Janine - la photographe
- Denise Provence as Gisèle
- André Weber as Gilbert
- Paul Faivre as Le patron du café
- Jean Hébey as Un inspecteur
- Jacqueline Marbaux as Solange
- Florence Blot as Madame Mortier
- Bernard Musson as L'hôtelier
- Gérard Barray as Le gigolo moustachu photographié par Janine
- Olivier Darrieux as Un gigolo
- Marcel Bozzuffi as Un accusé dans le box
- Serge Bento as Un accusé dans le box
- Geneviève Morel as La concierge
- Jacques Besnard as Le jeune homme
- Geymond Vital as L'avocat de la partie civile
- Jean Degrave as Un inspecteur
- Lucien Guervil as Un témoin
- Michel Nastorg as Le musicien
- Maurice Chevit as Un complice

== Bibliography ==
- Bessy, Maurice & Chirat, Raymond. Histoire du cinéma français: 1951-1955. Pygmalion, 1989.
- Rège, Philippe. Encyclopedia of French Film Directors, Volume 1. Scarecrow Press, 2009.
