= Monsieur Wens Holds the Trump Cards =

1947 film

- Directed by: Emile-Georges De Meyst
- Written by: Jacques Companéez; Norbert Carbonnaux
- Based on: Monsieur Wens Holds the Trump Cards by Stanislas-André Steeman
- Produced by: Georges Kritchevsky
- Starring: Louis Salou; Marie Déa; Claudine Dupuis
- Cinematography: Maurice Delattre
- Edited by: Jef Bruyninckx
- Music by: Robert Pottier
- Production company: Belnapro
- Distributed by: DisCina
- Release date: 14 May 1947
- Running time: 95 minutes
- Countries: Belgium; France
- Language: French

Monsieur Wens Holds the Trump Cards (French: Les atouts de Monsieur Wens) is a 1947 French-Belgian mystery crime film directed by Emile-Georges De Meyst and starring Louis Salou, Marie Déa and Claudine Dupuis. It is based on the 1932 novel of the same title by Belgian author Stanislas-André Steeman featuring the fictional detective Monsieur Wens. The film's sets were designed by the art director René Salme.

== Synopsis ==
In Antwerp a prominent diamond merchant and a candidate for the city council is accused in the press of being responsible for the mysterious disappearance of his brother in the Congo some time before. In order to clear his name, his wife Isabelle requests Inspector Wens to launch an investigation.

== Cast ==
- Louis Salou as Frédéric-Sébastien Dolo
- Marie Déa as Isabelle Dolo
- Claudine Dupuis as Jeanette
- Marcel Josz as Le juge
- Georges Jamin as Jeff
- Jos Gevers as Flup
- René Herdé as Bouchardon
- Omer Ducarme as Hans
- Denise Volny as Suzanne
- Viviane Chantel as Lily
- Werner Degan as Wenceslas Vorobeitchik 'Wens'

== Bibliography ==
- Mosley, Philip. Split Screen: Belgian Cinema and Cultural Identity. SUNY Press, 2001.
- Rège, Philippe. Encyclopedia of French Film Directors, Volume 1. Scarecrow Press, 2009.
