= Marcel Josz =

Belgian actor (1899–1984)

- Born: 9 May 1899; Molenbeek, Belgium
- Died: 23 September 1984 (aged 85); Brussels, Belgium
- Occupation: Actress
- Years active: 1945–1975 (film & TV)

Marcel Josz (9 May 1899–23 September 1984) was a Belgian stage and film actor. He played supporting roles in postwar French cinema.

== Selected filmography ==
- Monsieur Wens Holds the Trump Cards (1947)
- Are You Sure? (1947)
- Monsieur Leguignon, Signalman (1952)
- Alone in the World (1952)
- The Happiest of Men (1952)
- Midnight Witness (1953)
- Le Guérisseur (1953)
- Endless Horizons (1953)
- L'homme de Mykonos (1966)
- Home Sweet Home (1973)

== Bibliography ==
- Bessy, Maurice & Chirat, Raymond. Histoire du cinéma français: 1951-1955. Pygmalion, 1989.
- Lilar, Suzanne. The Belgian Theater Since 1890. Belgian Government Information Center, 1962.
