= Jacqueline Duc =

French actress

- Born: 12 April 1922; Paris, France
- Died: 30 November 2012 (aged 90); Suresnes, Paris, France
- Occupation: Actress
- Years active: 1946-

Jacqueline Duc (12 April 1922 – 30 November 2012) was a French stage, television and film actress.

== Selected filmography ==
- Patrie (1946)
- The White Night (1948)
- Casimir (1950)
- Three Women (1952)
- Bel Ami (1955)
- Promise at Dawn (1970)
- The Party (1980)

== Bibliography ==
- Hayward, Susan. French Costume Drama of the 1950s: Fashioning Politics in Film. Intellect Books, 2010.
