= Maurice Chambreuil =

French actor

Maurice Chambreuil, born Jean-Camille Bourguignon (14 July 1883 in Paris - 4 November 1963 in Paris) was a French stage actor. He was actress Anémone's grand-father.

== Comédie-Française ==
Entrance in 1925
Named 395th sociétaire in 1937
Leaves in 1954

== Filmography ==
- 1911: La Fin de Don Juan by Victorin Jasset - Le commandeur
- 1921: Le Rêve by Jacques de Baroncelli - Hubert
- 1922: Molière, sa vie, son œuvre by Jacques de Féraudy - himself
- 1946: L'Idiot by Georges Lampin - General Ivan Fedorovitch Epantchine
