= Full House (film) =

1952 film by Henri Verneuil

- Theatrical release poster
- French: Brelan d'as
- Directed by: Henri Verneuil
- Written by: Jacques Companéez; André Tabet
- Based on: Le Témoignage d'un enfant de choeur by Georges Simenon L'Alibi de monsieur Wens by Stanislas-André Steeman Je suis un tendre by Peter Cheyney
- Produced by: Jules Calamy; Raymond Froment
- Starring: Michel Simon; Raymond Rouleau; John Van Dreelen
- Cinematography: André Germain
- Edited by: Gabriel Rongier
- Music by: Hans May
- Production companies: Productions Calamy; Terra Films
- Distributed by: Pathé Consortium Cinéma
- Release date: 12 September 1952
- Running time: 118 minutes
- Country: France
- Language: French

Full House (French: Brelan d'as, lit. 'Three Aces') is a 1952 French crime mystery anthology film directed by Henri Verneuil and starring Michel Simon, Raymond Rouleau, John Van Dreelen, Arlette Merry and Nathalie Nattier. It consists of three segments, each featuring a popular detective character: Jules Maigret, Monsieur Wens and Lemmy Caution. It was shot at the Photosonor Studios in Paris and on location in and around Hamburg. The film's sets were designed by the art director René Moulaert.

== Cast ==
=== Le témoignage d'un enfant de choeur ===
- Michel Simon as Le commissaire Jules Maigret
- Claire Olivier as Madame Maigret
- Marguerite Garcya as La mère de Justin
- Alexandre Rignault as L'inspecteur Janvier
- Jérôme Goulven as Simon Lesueur - le brocanteur
- Christian Fourcade as Justin
- Louis Blanche as Le juge
- Henri Marchand as Le prêtre

=== L'alibi de monsieur Wens ===
- Raymond Rouleau as L'inspecteur Wenceslas Vorobeïtchik dit Wens
- Arlette Merry as Florence Garnier
- Jacqueline Porel as Denise
- René Génin as Le concierge
- André Dalibert as Le commissaire Malaise
- Maurice Teynac as Heldinge

=== Je suis un tendre ===
- John Van Dreelen as Lemmy Caution
- Nathalie Nattier as Michèle Leroy
- Inge Landgut as Gisella Hauptmann
- Pierre Sergeol as Leblond
- Reinhard Kolldehoff as Hartner
- Georges Tabet as Hubert
