= The Little Rebels =

1955 film

- Directed by: Jean Delannoy
- Written by: Jean Aurenche; François Boyer; Pierre Bost; Jean Delannoy
- Based on: Chiens perdus sans collier by Gilbert Cesbron
- Produced by: Joseph Bercholz; Henry Deutschmeister; Edouard Gide
- Starring: Jean Gabin; Anne Doat; Dora Doll
- Cinematography: Pierre Montazel
- Edited by: Borys Lewin
- Music by: Paul Misraki
- Production companies: Franco London Films; Les Films Gibé; Continental Produzione
- Distributed by: Cocinor
- Release date: 10 September 1955
- Running time: 93 minutes
- Countries: France; Italy
- Language: French

The Little Rebels (French: Chiens perdus sans collier, Italian: Cani perduti senza collare) is a 1955 French-Italian drama film directed by Jean Delannoy and starring Jean Gabin, Anne Doat and Dora Doll. It premiered at the 1955 Venice Film Festival before going on general release. It was one of the most popular films at the French box office that year, drawing over four million spectators. The film was based on the 1954 novel by Gilbert Cesbron. It was shot at the Boulogne Studios in Paris and on location around and near the city including Conflans and Provins. The film's sets were designed by the art director René Renoux.

== Synopsis ==
Judge Julien Lamy heads a tribunal sentencing juvenile delinquents. Despite his gruff exterior he takes a great interest in the young offenders who pass before him and the attempts to rehabilitate their lives.

== Cast ==
- Jean Gabin as Le juge Julien Lamy
- Anne Doat as Sylvette Villain
- Dora Doll as Madame Lecarnoy
- Robert Dalban as Joseph, le funambule
- Jean-Jacques Delbo as Un joueur de belote
- Jane Marken as La déléguée
- Claire Olivier as Madame Noël, la secrétaire du juge Lamy
- Renée Passeur as La grand-mère de Francis
- Raphaël Patorni as Le substitut
- Jean d'Yd as Le grand-père de Francis
- Serge Lecointe as Francis Lanoux
- Jacques Moulières as Gérard Lecarnoy
- Jimmy Urbain as Alain Robert
- Georges Aminel as L'avocat
- Josette Arno as La jeune prostituée
- Louis Bugette as Un inspecteur
- Véronique Deschamps as L'assistante sociale
- Gérard Fallec as Un gosse
- Jean Hébey as La Cravate
- Guy Henry as Un inspecteur
- Albert Michel as L'agriculteur voisin demandant l'échelle
- Germaine Michel as La postière
- Gabriele Tinti as Marcel, le surveillant

== Bibliography ==
- Faulkner, Sally (ed.) Middlebrow Cinema. Routledge, 2016.
- Harriss, Joseph. Jean Gabin: The Actor Who Was France. McFarland, 2018.
