= Gates of the Night =

- Theatrical release poster
- Directed by: Marcel Carné
- Written by: Jacques Prévert (dialogue)
- Screenplay by: Jacques Prévert (scenario)
- Based on: Jacques Prévert (ballet "Le rendez-vous")
- Produced by: Pierre Laurent
- Starring: Pierre Brasseur; Serge Reggiani; Yves Montand; Nathalie Nattier; Saturnin Fabre
- Cinematography: Philippe Agostini
- Edited by: Jean Feyte
- Music by: Joseph Kosma
- Color process: Black and white
- Production company: Société Nouvelle Pathé Cinéma
- Distributed by: Pathé Consortium Cinéma
- Release date: 3 December 1946
- Running time: 111 minutes
- Country: France
- Language: French

Gates of the Night (French: Les Portes de la nuit, pronounced [le pɔʁt də la nɥi]) is a 1946 French mystery film directed by Marcel Carné and starring Pierre Brasseur, Serge Reggiani, Yves Montand, Nathalie Nattier and Saturnin Fabre. The script was written by Carné's long-time collaborator Jacques Prévert. The film made its debut in the United States four years after its official release in France. It introduced the much-recorded popular song "Autumn Leaves" (French: Les feuilles mortes).

== Plot ==
In the winter of 1945, immediately after the liberation, Jean Diego (Montand), a member of the French underground during World War II, meets Raymond, one of his comrades in arms who was believed to have succumbed in battle. On the night of that meeting, Jean encounters a homeless man named "Destiny" (Jean Vilar), whose predictions about him finding the woman of his life will not be too far from reality. Jean soon starts a liaison with Malou (Nathalie Nattier), a young woman who is married to a rich man. The next hours of his and Malou's lives are underscored by extreme, dramatic events; however, as the clochard (homeless person) predicted, they find their way out of the struggle and are able to move on, leaving behind wartime and its dangers. Malou is shot and killed by her husband.

== Cast ==
- Pierre Brasseur as Georges
- Serge Reggiani as Guy Sénéchal
- Yves Montand as Jean Diego
- Nathalie Nattier as Malou
- Saturnin Fabre as Monsieur Sénéchal
- Raymond Bussières as Raymond Lécuyer
- Jean Vilar as Le clochard / La fortune
- Sylvia Bataille as Claire Lécuyer
- Jane Marken as Mme Germaine (as Jeanne Marken)
- Dany Robin as Étiennette
- Gabrielle Fontan as La vieille
- Christian Simon as Cricri Lécuyer
- Jean Maxime as L'amoureux d'Étiennette
- Fabien Loris as Le chanteur des rues
- Rene Blancard as Le voisin de palier
- Mady Berry as Madame Quinquina
- Julien Carette as Monsieur Quinquina (as Carette)

== Reception ==
Les Portes de la nuit was released in the United States four years after it was first shown in France, where this psychological urban drama, especially due to its depiction of post-war Paris and close-to-dejected characters did not break the box office. It has been said that this is not Yves Montand's best performance, probably because this was only his second film. Overall, Les Portes de la nuit has narrative weaknesses regarding the plot; however, its settings are considered to be fascinating. Unlike the more celebrated and popular La Bataille du rail released that same year, which depicts France as united in noble resistance to German occupation, Les Portes de la nuit is noteworthy for its honest acknowledgement of French collaboration with the enemy, as embodied by Serge Reggiani's character Guy.

== See also ==
- List of French films of 1946
