= The Pavilion Burns =

1941 film

- Directed by: Jacques de Baroncelli
- Written by: Solange Térac; Steve Passeur
- Based on: The Pavilion Burns by Steve Passeur
- Produced by: Denise Piazza; Roland Tual
- Starring: Pierre Renoir; Jean Marais
- Cinematography: Pierre Montazel
- Music by: Tony Aubin
- Production company: Synops Film
- Distributed by: Les Films Minerva
- Release date: 17 December 1941
- Running time: 90 minutes
- Country: France
- Language: French

The Pavilion Burns (French: Le Pavillon brûle) is a 1941 French comedy drama directed by Jacques de Baroncelli, written by Solange Térac, and starring Pierre Renoir and Jean Marais. It was based on the 1935 play of the same title by Steve Passeur. It was shot at the Cité Elgé studios in Paris. The film's sets were designed by the art director Serge Piménoff.

== Plot ==
Ramsay, an engineer, works in a copper mine in a French colony. He is confronted by a variety of huge technical and human problems.

== Cast ==
- Pierre Renoir as Jourdinsse
- Jean Marais as Daniel
- Bernard Blier as Benezy
- Michèle Alfa as Odette
- Marcel Herrand as Audignane
- Jean Marchat as Risay, engineer
- Marcel Pérès
- Lucien Coëdel
- Maurice Teynac
- Jean Carmet

== Bibliography ==
- Goble, Alan. The Complete Index to Literary Sources in Film. Walter de Gruyter, 1999.
