= Jacques Berthier (actor) =

French actor (1916–2008)

- Born: 10 February 1916; Paris, France
- Died: 6 April 2008 (aged 92); Neuilly-sur-Seine, France
- Occupation: Actor
- Years active: 1942-1996 (film & TV)
- Spouses: Suzanne Besnier (1939-?) (3 children); Lily Baron (1947-2008) (her death)

Jacques Berthier (10 February 1916 – 6 April 2008) was a French actor. He also produced and directed two films.

== Filmography ==
| Year | Title | Role | Notes |
|---|---|---|---|
| 1925 | Jack | Le Roudic | |
| 1934 | Le Voyage de monsieur Perrichon | Majorin | |
| 1934 | The Uncle from Peking | Le chef de gare | |
| 1942 | Le Destin fabuleux de Désirée Clary | Un conseiller | |
| 1944 | Behold Beatrice | Jacques Richelière | |
| 1946 | As Long as I Live | Bernard Fleuret | |
| 1946 | Goodbye Darling | Bruno Betillac | |
| 1946 | Le Bateau à soupe | Donatien Mahu - le second | |
| 1947 | The Sharks of Gibraltar | Le lieutenant David Brooks | |
| 1948 | Stolen Affections | Serge Loref | |
| 1950 | One Only Loves Once | Jean Monnier | |
| 1951 | Maria of the End of the World | Thierry | |
| 1951 | Les mémoires de la vache Yoland | | |
| 1951 | Shadow and Light | Jacques Barroy | |
| 1951 | Les Deux Monsieur de Madame | Georges Flavien | |
| 1953 | The Master of Ballantrae | Capt. Arnaud | |
| 1954 | Royal Affairs in Versailles | Maximilen de Robespierre | Uncredited |
| 1954 | Rasputin | Le prince Félix Youssoupoff / Youry | |
| 1954 | The Beautiful Otero | Jean Chastaing | |
| 1955 | Tom Toms of Mayumba | Clemens Van Waerten | |
| 1955 | A Missionary | Père Duval | |
| 1956 | Law of the Streets | | |
| 1956 | Les Insoumises | Gilbert Depreux | |
| 1957 | Charming Boys | André Noblet | |
| 1959 | Witness in the City | Pierre Verdier | |
| 1959 | Wild Cats on the Beach | Morand | |
| 1959 | Nathalie, Secret Agent | Jean Darbon | |
| 1961 | Who Are You, Mr. Sorge? | Serge de Branowski | |
| 1961 | The Three Musketeers | Buckingham | |
| 1962 | Lemmy pour les dames | Doctor Nollet | |
| 1962 | 79 A.D. | Tercius | |
| 1962 | The Old Testament | Apollonio | |
| 1964 | 3 Avengers | | French version, Voice |
| 1965 | Colorado Charlie | Sheriff 'Wild Bill' Danders | |
| 1966 | Uno sceriffo tutto d'oro | Jeff Randall | |
| 1967 | Tiffany Memorandum | Colonel Callaghan | |
| 1968 | Mayerling | Prince Salvator | |
| 1969 | Eagles Over London | Colonel Smith | |
| 1975 | The White, the Yellow, and the Black | Kelly Butler | |
| 1976 | Game of Seduction | M. Leroy | |
| 1976 | Frou-frou del tabarin | Duca Filippo di Fasano / Visconte d'Artois - Giorgio's father | |
| 1978 | Brigade mondaine | Paul-Henri Vaugoubert de Saint-Loup | |

== Bibliography ==
- Goble, Alan. The Complete Index to Literary Sources in Film. Walter de Gruyter, 1999.
