= Not Any Weekend for Our Love =

1950 film

Pas de week-end pour notre amour
- Directed by: Pierre Montazel
- Written by: Pierre Montazel
- Produced by: Les Films Gloria
- Starring: Luis Mariano; Jules Berry
- Music by: Roger Lucchesi
- Distributed by: U.F.P.C.
- Release date: 23 January 1950 (France)
- Running time: 96 minutes
- Country: France
- Language: French

Not Any Weekend for Our Love (French: Pas de week-end pour notre amour), is a French film from 1950, directed by Pierre Montazel, written by Pierre Montazel, and starring by Luis Mariano. The film was also features Louis de Funès.

== Cast ==
- Luis Mariano: Franck Reno, the baron's son, singer
- Jules Berry: Baron Richard de Valirman
- Louis de Funès: Constantin, the Baron de Valirman's servant
- Maria Mauban: Margaret Duval, journalist
- Denise Grey: Gabrielle, the wife of Alvarez, Franck's mother
- Bernard Lajarrige: Christian, Franck's brother
- Jean Ozenne: Bertrand Touquet, Laurie's father
- Jean Carmet: the pianist
