= Goodbye Darling =

1946 film directed by Raymond Bernard

- Directed by: Raymond Bernard
- Written by: Jacques Companéez; Alex Joffé; Marc-Gilbert Sauvajon; Raymond Bernard
- Produced by: Adolphe Osso; Jacques Roitfeld
- Starring: Danielle Darrieux; Louis Salou; Gabrielle Dorziat
- Cinematography: Robert Lefebvre
- Edited by: Charlotte Guilbert
- Music by: Wal Berg
- Production companies: Films Vendôme; Les Productions Jacques Roitfeld
- Distributed by: Les Films Osso
- Release date: 26 April 1946
- Running time: 115 minutes
- Country: France
- Language: French

Goodbye Darling (French: Adieu chérie) is a 1946 French drama film directed by Raymond Bernard and starring Danielle Darrieux, Louis Salou and Gabrielle Dorziat. The film's sets were designed by the art director Robert Gys.

== Cast ==
- Danielle Darrieux as Chérie
- Louis Salou as Maxime
- Gabrielle Dorziat as Constance
- Jacques Berthier as Bruno Betillac
- Germaine Stainval
- Rolande Forest
- Palmyre Levasseur
- Robert Seller
- Pierre Sergeol
- Edouard Hemme
- Jacques Janvier
- Pierre Larquey as Édouard
- Jean-Jacques Delbo as Ricardo
- Alice Tissot as Mademoiselle Chomelette
- Charles Aznavour as Le duettiste
- Robert de France
- Marguerite de Morlaye
- René Fluet
- Jean Gabert
- Marie Guilhène
- Johnny Marchand
- Marcel Roche

== Production ==
Guy Lefranc was assistant director on the movie.

== Bibliography ==
- Rège, Philippe. Encyclopedia of French Film Directors, Volume 1. Scarecrow Press, 2009.
