= Ayres d'Aguiar =

Portuguese film producer

- Born: 27 May 1896; Ponta Delgada, Açores, Portugal
- Died: 19 December 2000 (aged 104); Ponta Delgada, Açores, Portugal
- Occupations: Producer, Director
- Years active: 1933-1956 (film)

Ayres d'Aguiar (1896-2000) was a Portuguese film producer active in the Cinema of France. He also directed the 1940 comedy film Narcisse. He focused particularly on comedy films, a number of which starred Fernandel.

== Selected filmography ==
- The Scandal (1934)
- Ferdinand the Roisterer (1935)
- Jim la houlette (1935)
- Forty Little Mothers (1936)
- The Cheat (1937)
- Ignace (1937)
- The Kings of Sport (1937)
- Barnabé (1938)
- Narcisse (1940)
- Roger la Honte (1946)
- The Revenge of Roger (1946)
- Forbidden Fruit (1952)
- Children of Love (1953)

== Bibliography ==
- Guillaume-Grimaud, Geneviève. Le cinéma du Front populaire. Lherminier, 1986.
- Rège, Philippe. Encyclopedia of French Film Directors, Volume 1. Scarecrow Press, 2009.
