= Jules Mary =

French writer

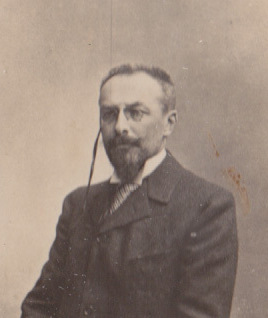
- Born: 20 March 1851; Launois-sur-Vence, Ardennes, France
- Died: 27 July 1922 (aged 71); Paris, France
- Occupation: Writer

Jules Mary (March 20, 1851 – July 27, 1922) was a French novelist. His melodramas were traditionally popular subjects for adaptation by filmmakers, and his best-known work Roger la Honte has been made into films five times.

== Biography ==
He was born in 1851 in the Ardennes. His father, Pierre Mary, was a hosier and his mother, Anne Marie Julie Lacatte, had no occupation. He went to school in his village, then to the minor seminary in Charleville. It was there that he met Arthur Rimbaud, with whom he formed a close.

== Selected works ==
- Roger la Honte (1886)
- La Pocharde (1898)

== Filmography ==
- Roger la Honte, directed by Adrien Caillard (1913, short film, based on the novel Roger la Honte)
- The Man of Shame, directed by Harry Myers (1915, based on the novel Roger la Honte)
- Blessée au coeur (1917, based on the novel Blessée au coeur)
- Les Feuilles tombent, directed by Georges Monca (1917, based on the novel Les Feuilles tombent)
- La Pocharde, directed by Henri Étiévant (1921, based on the novel La Pocharde)
- Víctima del odio, directed by José Buchs (Spain, 1921, based on the novel Roger la Honte)
- La Fille sauvage, directed by Henri Étiévant (1922, based on the novel La Fille sauvage)
- Roger la Honte, directed by Jacques de Baroncelli (1922, based on the novel Roger la Honte)
- The House of Mystery, directed by Alexandre Volkoff (1923, based on the novel La Maison du mystère)
- La Goutte de sang, directed by Jean Epstein and Maurice Mariaud (1924, based on the novel La Goutte de sang)
- Roger la Honte, directed by Gaston Roudès (1933, based on the novel Roger la Honte)
- The House of Mystery, directed by Gaston Roudès (1933, based on the novel La Maison du mystère)
- The Drunkard, directed by Jean-Louis Bouquet and Jean Kemm (1937, based on the novel La Pocharde)
- Roger la Honte, directed by André Cayatte (1946, based on the novel Roger la Honte)
- The Revenge of Roger, directed by André Cayatte (1946, based on the novel Roger la Honte)
- The Drunkard, directed by Georges Combret (1953, based on the novel La Pocharde)
- Trap for the Assassin, directed by Riccardo Freda (1966, based on the novel Roger la Honte)

== Bibliography ==
- Goble, Alan. The Complete Index to Literary Sources in Film. Walter de Gruyter, 1999.
