= The Charterhouse of Parma (film) =

- Directed by: Christian-Jaque
- Written by: Pierre Jarry; Christian-Jaque
- Based on: The Charterhouse of Parma by Stendhal
- Produced by: Franco Magli; Fred Orain; André Paulvé
- Starring: Renée Faure; Gérard Philipe
- Cinematography: Anchise Brizzi; Romolo Garroni; Nicolas Hayer; G. R. Aldo
- Edited by: Jacques Desagneaux; Giulia Fontana
- Music by: Renzo Rossellini
- Production companies: Les Films André Paulvé; Scalera Film; Excelsa Film
- Distributed by: DisCina; San Paolo Films
- Release dates: 21 February 1948 (Italy); 21 May 1948 (France)
- Running time: 166 minutes
- Countries: France; Italy
- Languages: French; Italian
- Box office: 6,151,922 admissions (France) ₤166 million (Italy)

The Charterhouse of Parma (French: La Chartreuse de Parme; Italian: La Certosa di Parma) is a 1948 French-Italian historical drama film directed by Christian-Jaque and starring Renée Faure, Gérard Philipe and Maria Casarès. It is based on the 1839 novel of the same name by Stendhal. The film's sets were created by the art directors Jean d'Eaubonne and Ottavio Scotti and the costumes were designed by Georges Annenkov. The film was made at the Cinecittà Studios in Rome while location shooting took place in Italy around Milan and Lake Como.

It entered the competition at the 1948 Locarno International Film Festival, being awarded for best cinematography. It was the most popular French film at the French box office in 1948. In Italy it earned around 166 million lira on its release.

== Cast ==
- Renée Faure as Clélia Conti
- Gérard Philipe as Fabrice del Dongo
- Maria Casarès as Duchess Gina de San Severina
- Louis Salou as Prince Ernest IV
- Louis Seigner as Grillo
- Tullio Carminati as Count Mosca
- Lucien Coëdel as Rassi
- Enrico Glori as Gilletti
- Aldo Silvani as General Conti
- Tina Lattanzi as Maria Luisa di Borbone-Parma
- Attilio Dottesio as Ferrante Palla
- Claudio Gora as Crescenzi
- Nerio Bernardi as Fausta's Husband

== Bibliography ==
- Chiti, Roberto & Poppi, Roberto. Dizionario del cinema italiano: Dal 1945 al 1959. Gremese Editore, 1991.
- Moliterno, Gino. The A to Z of Italian Cinema. Scarecrow Press, 2009.
