= Soldiers without Uniforms =

1944 film by E.G. de Meyst

Soldiers without Uniforms is a 1944 Belgian film directed by E.G. de Meyst.

It recorded admissions in France of 1,509,337.
