= Monique Kirsanoff =

French film editor

- Born: Berthe Noëlla Bessette; 25 December 1913; Sussac, Haute-Vienne, France
- Died: 20 September 2008 (aged 94); Boscamnant, Charente-Maritime, France
- Occupation: Film editor
- Years active: 1938–1980
- Spouse: Dimitri Kirsanoff

Berthe Noëlla Bessette (25 December 1913 – 20 September 2008), known as Monique Kirsanoff, was a French film editor active from the 1930s through the 1980s. She was married to Estonia-born director Dimitri Kirsanoff.

== Selected filmography ==
- The Blood Rose (1970)
- All Mad About Him (1967)
- Tender Scoundrel (1966)
- Crime on a Summer Morning (1965)
- Backfire (1964)
- The Stowaway (1958)
- Blackmail (1955)
- The Hotshot (1955)
- The Count of Monte Cristo (1954)
- She and Me (1952)
- The Respectful Prostitute (1952)
- Monsieur Leguignon, Signalman (1952)
- The Red Needle (1951)
- Young Love (1951)
- Les anciens de Saint-Loup (1950)
- Miquette (1950)
- Return to Life (1949)
- Clochemerle (1948)
- Fantômas (1947)
- A Cop (1947)
- Devil and the Angel (1946)
- Special Mission (1946)
- The Last Metro (1945)
- Blondine (1945)
