= The Dark Angels (film) =

1937 film

- Belgian poster
- Directed by: Willy Rozier
- Written by: Willy Rozier
- Based on: Les anges noirs 1936 novel by François Mauriac
- Produced by: Willy Rozier
- Starring: Suzy Prim; Paul Bernard; Henri Rollan
- Cinematography: Marc Bujard
- Music by: Jean Yatove
- Production company: Burdiga Film
- Distributed by: Cobeldi Films
- Release date: 28 October 1937
- Running time: 95 minutes
- Country: France
- Language: French

The Dark Angels (French: Les anges noirs) is a 1937 French crime drama film directed by Willy Rozier and starring Suzy Prim, Paul Bernard and Henri Rollan. It was adapted from the 1936 novel of the same title by François Mauriac.

== Cast ==
- Suzy Prim as Catherine
- Paul Bernard as L'abbé Forcas
- Henri Rollan as Gabriel Cardère
- Fernand Charpin as Symphorien Desbat
- Germaine Dermoz as Mathilde Desbat
- Pauline Carton as La servante
- Florelle as Aline
- Dina Balder as Tota
- André Fouché as Andrès

== Bibliography ==
- Bessy, Maurice & Chirat, Raymond. Histoire du cinéma français: 1935-1939. Pygmalion, 1986.
- Crisp, Colin. Genre, Myth and Convention in the French Cinema, 1929-1939. Indiana University Press, 2002.
- Goble, Alan. The Complete Index to Literary Sources in Film. Walter de Gruyter, 1999.
- Rège, Philippe. Encyclopedia of French Film Directors, Volume 1. Scarecrow Press, 2009.
