= Counter Investigation (1947 film) =

1947 film

- Directed by: Jean Faurez
- Written by: Jacques Companéez; Christiane Imbert; André Tabet
- Produced by: Claude Heymann
- Starring: Lucien Coëdel; Louis Salou; Jany Holt
- Cinematography: Charles Bauer; Jules Kruger; Pierre Montazel
- Edited by: Geneviève Bretoneiche
- Music by: Michel Emer; Vincent Scotto; Jean Wiener
- Production company: Élysées Ciné Productions
- Distributed by: Filmsonor
- Release date: 21 March 1947
- Running time: 95 minutes
- Country: France
- Language: French

Counter Investigation (French: Contre-enquête) is a 1947 French crime drama film directed by Jean Faurez and starring Lucien Coëdel, Louis Salou and Jany Holt. It was shot at the Studio François 1 in Paris. The film's sets were designed by the art directors Roger Briaucourt and René Moulaert.

== Synopsis ==
A man wrongly accused of murdering his wife escapes from prison just before his execution and goes on the run. He begs the retired gangster Monsieur Charles to launch his own investigation into the crime to uncover the real culprit. He embarks on this mission with the help of his wife Ginette and two former associates.

== Cast ==
- Lucien Coëdel as Monsieur Charles
- Louis Salou as Ludovic Bresson dit Paragraphe
- Jany Holt as Ginette
- Maurice Teynac as Serge de Souquières
- Abel Jacquin as Alain Marchal
- Paul Frankeur as Teddy Coffre-Fort
- Pierre-Louis as Ouverture-Eclair
- Lise Topart as Michèle Marchal
- Marguerite Pierry as Tante Brigitte
- Gisèle Préville as Odette Marchal
- Marcel André as Le juge d'instruction Nicolas Fournier
- Renée Dennsy as La bonne

== Bibliography ==
- Martin, Yves. Le cinéma français, 1946-1966: un jeune homme au fil des vagues. Editions Méréal, 1998.
