= All Mad About Him =

1967 film

- Directed by: Norbert Carbonnaux
- Written by: Michel Audiard; Norbert Carbonnaux; François Fabert; Maurice Fabre; Didier Goulard
- Produced by: Paul-Edmond Decharme
- Starring: Robert Hirsch; Sophie Desmarets; Maria Latour
- Cinematography: Edmond Séchan
- Edited by: Monique Kirsanoff
- Music by: Serge Gainsbourg; Georges Garvarentz
- Production companies: Daiano Film; Sud-Pacifique Films
- Distributed by: Prodis
- Release date: 24 May 1967
- Running time: 100 minutes
- Countries: France; Italy
- Language: French

All Mad About Him (French: Toutes folles de lui) is a 1967 French-Italian comedy film directed by Norbert Carbonnaux and starring Robert Hirsch, Sophie Desmarets and Maria Latour.

The film's sets were designed by the art directors Georges Wakhévitch. It was shot in Eastmancolor. Future star Edwige Fenech made her screen debut in the film.

== Cast ==
- Robert Hirsch as Mathieu Gossin
- Sophie Desmarets as Hélène Maccard
- Maria Latour as Lily
- Jacqueline Coué as Mélina
- Julien Guiomar as Antoine Bascou
- Jean-Pierre Marielle as Le Révérend-Père Fouquet
- Hélène Dieudonné as La marquise
- Georges Chamarat as Maître Liotard
- Yvette Lebon as Nine
- Colette Mareuil as Marlène
- Jean-Jacques Delbo as L'attaché
- Marisa Merlini as Allegra
- Sylvie Bréal as Marisa
- Judith Magre as La voyante
- Amarande as La teinturière
- Danièle Domenge as La barmaid
- Maria Siraco as La comptable
- Edwige Fenech as Gina
- José Plaza as Le ténor
- Claude Lombardo as Lino
- Amler as Le barman romain
- Josiane Pabien as L'employée du pressing
- Arthur Mauge as Le prince arabe
- Jacqueline Richier as Une italienne
- Michèle Menu as Une italienne

== Bibliography ==
- Peter Cowie & Derek Elley. World Filmography: 1967. Fairleigh Dickinson University Press, 1977.
