= The Man Who Returns from Afar =

1950 film directed by Joan Castanyer

- Directed by: Jean Castanier
- Written by: Gaston Leroux (novel); Louis Chavance; Paul Guth
- Produced by: Pierre Gérin
- Starring: Annabella; Paul Bernard; María Casares
- Cinematography: Georges Million
- Edited by: Myriam Borsoutsky
- Music by: Yves Baudrier
- Production company: Les Productions Cinématographiques
- Release date: 7 April 1950
- Running time: 90 minutes
- Country: France
- Language: French

The Man Who Returns from Afar (French: L'homme qui revient de loin) is a 1950 French thriller film directed by Jean Castanier and starring Annabella, Paul Bernard and María Casares. It is based on the 1916 novel of the same title by Gaston Leroux.

The film's sets were designed by Maurice Colasson.

== Cast ==
- Annabella as Fanny de la Bossière
- Paul Bernard as Jacques de la Bossière
- María Casares as Marthe Saint-Firmin
- Daniel Lecourtois as Le docteur Moutier
- Jacques Servières as André Munda de la Bossière
- Édouard Delmont as Prosper
- France Ellys as Mademoiselle Hélier
- Henri Crémieux as Le notaire Saint-Firmin
- Marius David
- Pierre Duncan
- Claude Garbe
- Michel Seldow
- Solange Sicard

== Bibliography ==
- Goble, Alan. The Complete Index to Literary Sources in Film. Walter de Gruyter, 1999.
