= A Change in the Wind (1949 film) =

1949 film

- Directed by: Jean Faurez
- Written by: Jean Faurez; René Moulaert; Pierre Rocher
- Produced by: Robert Chabert; Fred Orain; Marcel Roux
- Starring: Roger Pigaut; Sophie Desmarets; Louis Seigner
- Cinematography: Jacques Mercanton
- Edited by: Charles Bretoneiche
- Music by: Georges Van Parys
- Production company: Cady Films
- Distributed by: Francinex
- Release date: 2 January 1949
- Running time: 99 minutes
- Country: France
- Language: French

A Change in the Wind (French: Vire-vent) is a 1949 French comedy film directed by Jean Faurez and starring Roger Pigaut, Sophie Desmarets and Louis Seigner. The film's sets were designed by the art director René Moulaert.

== Synopsis ==
The Donadieu Family live in Provence in a carefree manner until one of their daughters Claire falls in love with Paul, a mountain dweller.

== Cast ==
- Roger Pigaut as Paul Chapus
- Sophie Desmarets as Claire Donadieu
- Louis Seigner as Monsieur Bourride
- Fernand René as Le père Donadieu
- Guy Decomble as Justin
- Mady Berry as La mère Donadieu
- Paulette Élambert as La troisième fille
- Marie Daëms as Julie
- Jacques Passy as Timoléon
- Pierrette Caillol
- Marina de Berg
- Claire Gérard
- Jean-François Martial
- Marcel Mérovée
- Henri Poupon

== Bibliography ==
- Bessy, Maurice & Chirat, Raymond. Histoire du cinéma français: encyclopédie des films, 1940–1950. Pygmalion, 1986
- Hubert-Lacombe, Patricia. Le cinéma français dans la guerre froide: 1946-1956. L'Harmattan, 1996.
- Rège, Philippe. Encyclopedia of French Film Directors, Volume 1. Scarecrow Press, 2009.
