= Bel Ami (1955 film) =

- East German poster
- Directed by: Louis Daquin
- Written by: Guy de Maupassant (novel); Louis Daquin; Vladimir Pozner; Roger Vailland
- Produced by: André Cultet; Oskar Glück
- Starring: Anne Vernon; Renée Faure; Jean Danet
- Cinematography: Nicolas Hayer; Viktor Meihsl
- Edited by: Leontine Klicka
- Music by: Hanns Eisler
- Production companies: Projektograph Film; Kleber Film; Les Films Malhesherbes
- Distributed by: Les Films Marceau (France); Progress Film (East Germany)
- Release date: 19 April 1955
- Running time: 100 minutes
- Countries: Austria; France; East Germany
- Language: German

Bel Ami is a 1955 historical drama film directed by Louis Daquin and starring Anne Vernon, Renée Faure and Jean Danet. It was a co-production of Austria, France and East Germany. The film was shot in the Soviet-controlled Rosenhügel Studios in Vienna.

It is an adaptation of the 1885 novel Bel Ami by Guy de Maupassant.

== Cast ==
French Version

- Jean Danet as Georges Duroy, called "Bel Ami"
- Anne Vernon as Clothilde de Marelle
- Renée Faure as Madeleine Forestier
- René Lefèvre as Le banquier Walter
- Christl Mardayn as Virginie Walter
- Maria Emo as Suzanne Walter
- Jacqueline Duc as Rachel
- Jean-Roger Caussimon as Charles Forestier
- Lukas Ammann as Le ministre Laroche-Mathieu
- Egon von Jordan as Le reporter Saint-Potin

German Version

- Johannes Heesters as Georges Duroy, called "Bel Ami"
- Gretl Schörg as Clothilde de Marelle
- Marianne Schönauer as Madeleine Forestier
- René Lefèvre as Le banquier Walter
- Christl Mardayn as Virginie Walter
- Maria Emo as Suzanne Walter
- Jacqueline Duc as Rachel
- Jean-Roger Caussimon as Charles Forestier
- Lukas Ammann as Le ministre Laroche-Mathieu
- Egon von Jordan as Le reporter Saint-Potin

== Bibliography ==
- Williams, Alan. Film and Nationalism. Rutgers University Press, 2002.
