= Night Shift (1944 film) =

1944 film

- Directed by: Jean Faurez
- Written by: Belisario L. Randone; Guglielmo Usellini; Nino Frank
- Produced by: Julien Rivière
- Starring: Gaby Morlay; Jacques Dumesnil; Vivi Gioi
- Cinematography: René Gaveau
- Edited by: Maurice Bonin; Madeleine Bonin
- Music by: Roger Desormière
- Production companies: Francinex; Consorzio EIA
- Distributed by: Francinex
- Release date: 19 April 1944
- Running time: 99 minutes
- Countries: France; Italy
- Language: French

Night Shift (French: Service de Nuit, Italian: Turno di notte) is a 1944 French-Italian comedy film directed by Jean Faurez and starring Gaby Morlay, Jacques Dumesnil and Vivi Gioi. The film's sets were designed by the art director René Moulaert.

== Synopsis ==
A night telephone operator in a Savoy village possesses knowledge of local affairs and manages information locally without public disclosure.

== Cast ==
- Gaby Morlay as Suzanne
- Jacques Dumesnil as Pierre Jansen
- Vivi Gioi as Hélène Jansen
- Jaqueline Bouvier as Marcelle
- Yves Deniaud as Victor
- Gabrielle Fontan as Maria
- Marcelle Hainia as Madame Sandoz
- Jean Daurand as René Favier
- Albert Duvaleix as Le brigadier
- Georges Pally as Monsieur Sandoz
- Robert Dhéry as Arthur, le chanteur
- Paul Frankeur as Un réparateur de ligne
- Henri Charrett as Le chef de gare
- Raymone as Joséphine, la bonne des Sandoz
- Mona Dol as Mathilde, la sage-femme
- Rolande Gardet as Odette, la fiancée d'Arthur
- Lucien Gallas as Paul Rémy
- Louis Seigner as Le docteur Renaud
- Julien Carette as Auguste Masson
- Pierre Collet as Un réparateur de ligne
- Simone Signoret as Une danseuse à la taverne

== Bibliography ==
- Burch, Noël & Sellier, Geneviève. The Battle of the Sexes in French Cinema, 1930–1956. Duke University Press, 2013.
- Hayward, Susan. Simone Signoret: The Star as Cultural Sign. Continuum, 2004.
