= María Casares =

French actress (1922 – 1996)

María Casarès
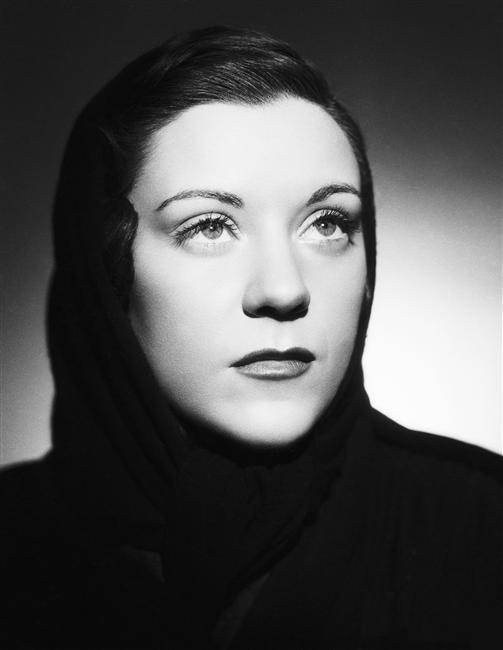
- María Casarès, photographed by Studio Harcourt in 1944
- Born: María Victoria Casares y Pérez; 21 November 1922; A Coruña, Galicia, Spain
- Died: 22 November 1996 (aged 74); Alloue, Poitou-Charentes, France
- Education: Paris Conservatoire
- Occupation: Actress
- Spouse: André Schlesser (m. 1978; died 1985)
- Father: Santiago Casares Quiroga

María Victoria Casares y Pérez (21 November 1922 – 22 November 1996) was a Spanish-born French actress and one of the most distinguished stars of the French stage and cinema. She was credited in France as Maria Casarès.

== Early life ==
Casares was born María Victoria Casares y Pérez in A Coruña, Galicia, the daughter of Santiago Casares Quiroga, a minister in Manuel Azaña's government and Prime Minister of Spain, and of Gloria Pérez. She was a volunteer in Madrid hospitals already at age fourteen. Her father was a member of the Republican government so at the outbreak of the Spanish Civil War (1936), the family was forced to flee Spain. Her father went to London, but she and her mother sought refuge in Paris.

There, María attended the Victor Duruy school, where she learned French and was befriended by a teacher and his Spanish wife, who inspired her to go into the theatre. After graduation, she took voice classes with René Simon. She enrolled in the Paris Conservatoire, where she won First Prize for tragedy and Second Prize for comedy.

== Career ==
In July 1942, she auditioned for Marcel Herrand who engaged her for his Théâtre des Mathurins. There, over the course of the next three years, she appeared in several plays including, Deirdre of the Sorrows by J. M. Synge, The Master Builder by Ibsen, Le Malentendu (The Misunderstanding) by Albert Camus (with whom she would later have a passionate affair), and an important premiere, Fédérico, after Prosper Mérimée, with Gérard Philipe.

=== Film ===
Casares began to appear in films. Her first film role was in Marcel Carné's Les Enfants du paradis (1945), one of the great classics of French cinema. She also made Les Dames du Bois de Boulogne (1945) for Robert Bresson, La Chartreuse de Parme (The Charterhouse of Parma) (1948) for Christian-Jaque, co-starring Gérard Philipe. For Cocteau, she played Death in his Orphée (1950) with Jean Marais and François Périer and in his Testament d'Orphée (Testament of Orpheus) (1960).

In 1989, she was nominated for the César Award for Best Supporting Actress in La Lectrice.

=== Stage success ===
From 1952 onward, although she continued to appear in occasional films, she devoted herself mainly to the stage. She joined the Festival d'Avignon, the Comédie-Française and the Théâtre National Populaire under the leadership of Jean Vilar. Before her, no one actor or actress of foreign origin had ever played at Comédie-Française. She toured extensively throughout the world, appearing in the great classics of French theatre, including, in 1958, Corneille's Le Cid, Victor Hugo's Marie Tudor and Marivaux's Le Triomphe de l'Amour (The Triumph of Love) on Broadway.

== Personal life and death ==
Casares published her autobiography, Résidente privilégiée (Privileged Resident) in 1980, in which she described her 16-year affair with Albert Camus. Camus never divorced his wife, but their extensive correspondence, first published in France in late 2017, lasted from 1944, with a five-year break to 1949, when they again had a chance meeting and rekindled their passion, until the end of Camus's life. She starred in a number of Camus's plays and often threatened to end their stormy affair over his refusal to leave Francine Faure.

Casares took French nationality in 1975 and three years later married André Schlesser, an actor known professionally as Dade, who had been her longtime companion and theatrical co-star.

The actress died of colon cancer at her country house, Château de La Vergne, in the village of Alloue in Poitou-Charentes, on the day after her 74th birthday. She bequeathed the property to the village. Today, the Domaine de la Vergne is a residence for artists and a setting for performances.

== Filmography ==
=== Films ===
- Les Enfants du paradis (1945) Nathalie
- Les Dames du Bois de Boulogne (1945) Hélène
- Roger la Honte (1946) Julia de Noirville
- The Revenge of Roger (1946) Julia de Terrenoire
- Love Around the House (1947) Thérèse
- The Seventh Door (1947)
- Bagarres (1948) Carmelle
- The Charterhouse of Parma (1948) La duchesse Gina de San Severina
- The Man Who Returns from Afar (1950)
- Guernica (1950) (voice)
- Orphée (1950) The Princess
- Shadow and Light (1951) Caroline Bessier
- Le Jardins du Seigneur (1954) (voice)
- Testament of Orpheus (1960) The Princess
- Hieronymus Bosch (1963) (voice)
- Flavia, la monaca musulmana (1974) Sister Agatha
- Blanche et Marie (1985) Louise
- Blood and Sand (1987) Dolores
- The Reader (1988) General's Widow
- Monte bajo (1989)
- Les Chevaliers de la table ronde (1990) Viviane
- Someone Else's America (1995) Alonso's Mother

=== TV ===
- Énigmes de l'histoire (1956)
- Macbeth (1959) Lady Macbeth
- Yerma (1963) Yerma
- La Reine verte (1964)
- L'Île des chèvres (1975) Agata
- Britannicus (1977) Agrippine
- Irène et sa folie (1980) Le docteur Burns
- Peer Gynt (1981) Ase
- Les Bonnes (1985) Madame
- Les Nuits révolutionnaires (1989) La Murène

== Sources ==
- Résidente privilégiée, Fayard, 1980, ISBN 2-213-00779-9
- El periodismo es un cuento by Manuel Rivas (chapter: "La mujer rebelde"), Alfaguara, 1997, ISBN 9788420479071
- Maria Casarès: L'étrangère by Javier Figuero & Marie-Hélène Carbonel, Fayard, 2005, ISBN 9782213624013
- La extranjera by Javier Figuero, CreateSpace Independent Publishing Platform, February 2017, ISBN 9781542994071
- Tu me vertiges. L'amour interdit de Maria Casarès et Albert Camus by Florence M.-Forsythe, Le Passeur Éditeur, March 2017, ISBN 9782368905203
- Albert Camus, Maria Casarès. Correspondance inédite (1944–1959). Avant-propos de Catherine Camus. Gallimard, November 2017, ISBN 9782072746161
