= Solange Térac =

French screenwriter and film director (1907–1993)

- Born: 13 February 1907; Paris, France
- Died: 14 September 1993 (aged 86); Paris, France
- Other name: Solange Hélène Tissot
- Occupations: Writer, Director
- Years active: 1929 - 1965 (film)

Solange Térac (13 February 1907 – 14 September 1993) was a French screenwriter and film director. Primarily a writer, she directed three films including Koenigsmark (1953).

== Selected filmography ==
=== Director ===
- La vagabonde (1932)
- Mon amant l'assasin (1932)
- Koenigsmark (1953)

=== Screenwriter ===
- The Pavilion Burns (1941)
- Lucrèce (1943)
- As Long as I Live (1946)
- Once is Enough (1946)
- The Mysterious Monsieur Sylvain (1947)
- Convicted (1948)
- Fantomas Against Fantomas (1949)
- Eve and the Serpent (1949)
- The Nude Woman (1949)
- Face to the Wind (1950)
- Shadow and Light (1951)
- Leguignon the Healer (1954)
- Let's Be Daring, Madame (1957)
- The River of Three Junks (1957)
- Passeport diplomatique agent K 8 (1965)

== Bibliography ==
- H R. Kedward & Nancy Wood. The Liberation of France: Image and Event. Bloomsbury Academic, 1995.
