= Law of the Streets =

- Directed by: Ralph Habib
- Written by: Jean Ferry; Ralph Habib
- Produced by: Transcontinental Films (France)
- Starring: Raymond Pellegrin; Louis de Funès
- Cinematography: Pierre Petit
- Music by: Emile Stern
- Distributed by: Columbia
- Release date: 25 April 1956 (France)
- Running time: 110 minutes
- Country: France
- Language: French
- Box office: 1 560 744 admissions (France)

Law of the Streets (French: La Loi des rues) is a French drama film from 1956 directed by Ralph Habib, written by Jean Ferry and starring Raymond Pellegrin and Louis de Funès.

== Cast ==
- Raymond Pellegrin : 'Jo le Grec", a procurer
- Silvana Pampanini : Wanda, a prostitute
- Jean-Louis Trintignant : Yves Tréguier, called: "Le Breton", young orphan
- Jean Gaven : André Remoulin dit : "Dédé la Glace", the friend of Yves
- Lino Ventura : Mario
- Josette Arno : Zette, Yves' lover
- Fernand Ledoux : Le père Blain, bistro keeper
- Jean-Marc Tennberg : Marcel
- Mary Marquet : Mme Blain
- Roland Lesaffre : Le Grêlé
- Marius Laurey Le Rat
- Robert Dalban : trucker
- Louis de Funès : "Paulo les chiens"
