= Ralph Habib =

French film director of Lebanese origin

Ralph Habib (Paris, 29 June 1912 – Paris, 27 June 1969) was a French film director of Lebanese origin. He started his film career with Pathé. He later worked as assistant director notably Jean Dréville and Jean-Paul Le Chanois before directing his own films.

== Filmography ==
- 1951 : Rue des Saussaies
- 1952 : The Forest of Farewell
- 1953 : Les Compagnes de la nuit
- 1954 : La Rage au corps (English title Tempest in the Flesh)
- 1954 : The Bed
- 1954 : Crainquebille
- 1955 : Men in White
- 1956 : La Loi des rues (English title Law of the Streets)
- 1956 : Women's Club
- 1957 : Escapade
- 1959 : The Black Chapel based on the novel Die schwarze Kapelle by Olaf Herfeldt
  - French title - R.P.Z. appelle Berlin
  - German title - Geheimaktion schwarze Kapelle
  - Italian title - I sicari di Hitler
- 1960 : The Nabob Affair
- 1966 : The Lonely Man Attacks
- 1967 : Hotel Clausewitz

Joint film with Lee Robinson

- 1958 : The Stowaway (English version) / Le Passager clandestin (French version)

Joint film with Gérard Sire

- 1967-1968 : Un taxi dans les nuages
