= René Moulaert =

Belgian art director

- Born: 7 November 1901; Brussels, Belgium
- Died: 16 January 1965 (aged 63); Ablon-sur-Seine, Val-de-Marne, France
- Occupation: Art director
- Years active: 1932–1965 (film)

René Moulaert (1901–1965) was a Belgian art director who worked on designing stage and film sets.

== Selected filmography ==
- The Marriage of Mademoiselle Beulemans (1932)
- Strange Inheritance (1943)
- Night Shift (1944)
- Girl with Grey Eyes (1945)
- Patrie (1946)
- Sybille's Night (1947)
- Something to Sing About (1947)
- Counter Investigation (1947)
- The Loves of Colette (1948)
- The Lovers Of Verona (1949)
- The Sinners (1949)
- A Change in the Wind (1949)
- Thirst of Men (1950)
- Véronique (1950)
- Julie de Carneilhan (1950)
- The Night Is My Kingdom (1951)
- My Seal and Them (1951)
- Village Feud (1951)
- My Friend Oscar (1951)
- Great Man (1951)
- The Happiest of Men (1952)
- Full House (1952)
- Wolves Hunt at Night (1952)
- Stain in the Snow (1954)
- Zoé (1954)
- The Heroes Are Tired (1955)
- It Happened in Aden (1956)
- Sergeant X (1960)
- Women Are Like That (1960)
- The Sahara Is Burning (1961)
- Your Turn, Darling (1963)
- Shadow of Evil (1964)
- Marvelous Angelique (1965)

== Bibliography ==
- Marianne Thys. Belgian Cinema. Cinematheque Royale du Belgique, 1999.
