= Gabrielle Dorziat =

French actress (1880–1979)

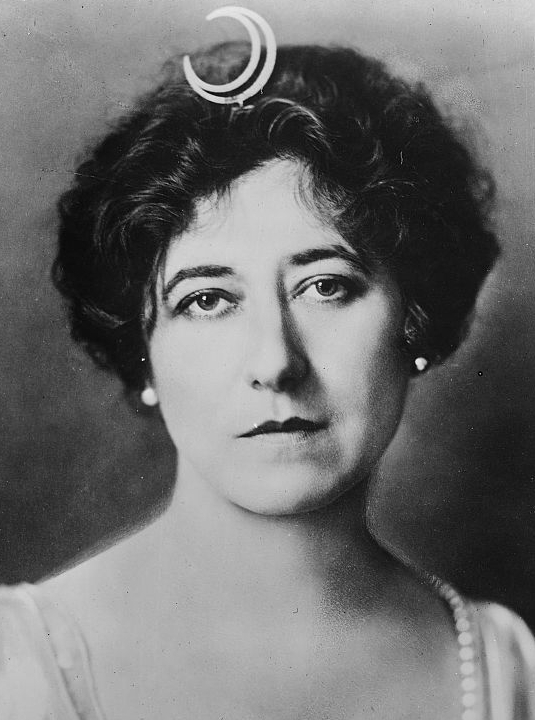
- Born: Gabrielle Sigrist Moppert; 25 January 1880; Épernay, France
- Died: 30 November 1979 (aged 99); Biarritz, France
- Years active: 1898–1971
- Spouse: Count Michel de Zogheb (1925–1964)

Gabrielle Dorziat (25 January 1880 – 30 November 1979) was a French stage and film actress. Dorziat was a fashion trend setter in Paris and helped popularize the designs of Coco Chanel. The Théâtre Gabrielle-Dorziat in Épernay, France is named for her.

== Biography ==
She was born in 1880. Dorziat made her stage début in 1898 at the Royal Park Theatre in Brussels. She moved to Paris and appeared in Alfred Capus' La Bourse ou la vie (1900), but it was her performance as Thérèse Herbault in Chaîne anglaise (1906) that brought her to public attention. She became known for her off-stage life as well, becoming romantically involved with actors Lucien Guitry and Louis Jouvet. She had close friendships with Jean Cocteau, Jean Giraudoux, Coco Chanel, Paul Bourget and Henri Bernstein. During World War I Dorziat left France to tour the United States where she raised money for war refugees. After the war she toured Canada, South America and the rest of Europe.

In 1921 Dorziat appeared in her first film L'Infante à la rose. She went on to play in over sixty films including Mayerling, Les Parents terribles and Manon. In 1925, she married Count Michel de Zogheb, a friend of King Fuad I of Egypt and who came from a wealthy Alexandrian family of Syrian Damascene descent. She published her memoirs Côté cour, côté jardin in 1968.

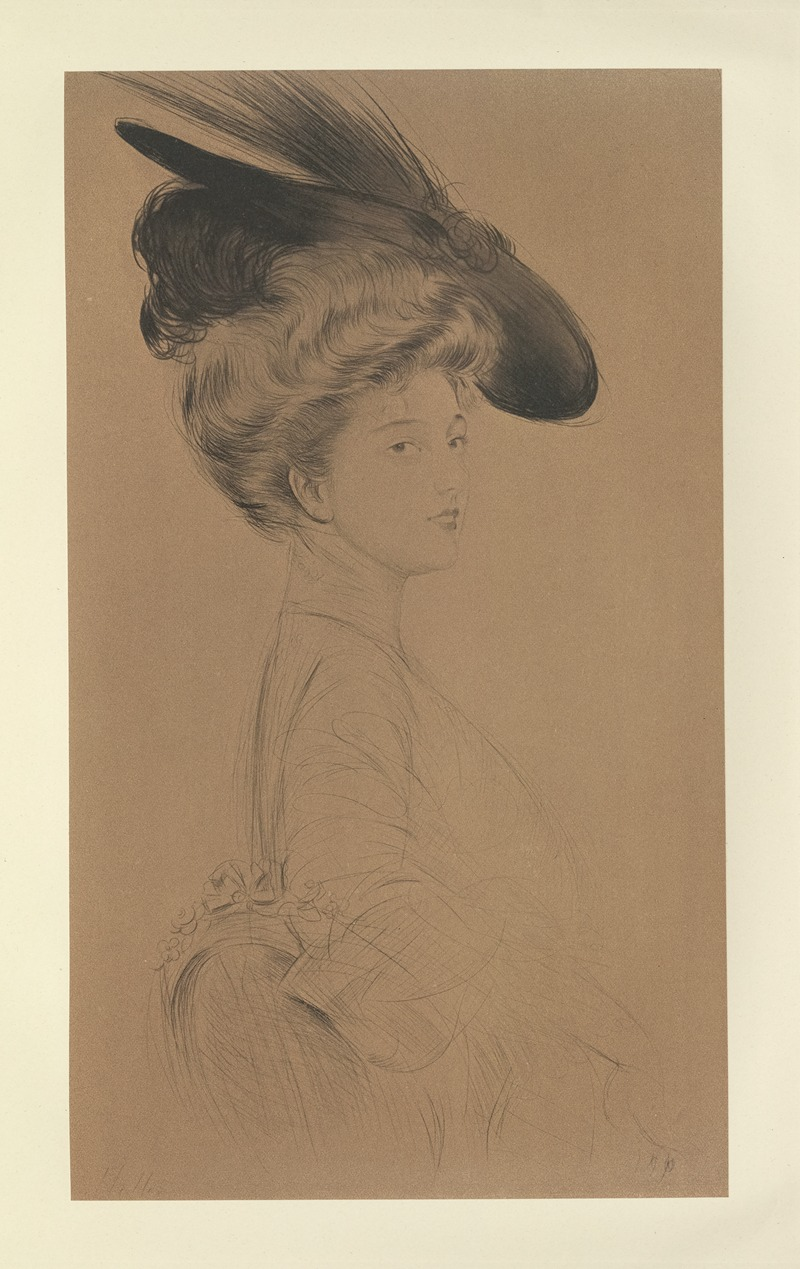
Sketch of Gabrielle Dorziat by artist Paul César Helleu

She died in 1979.

== Partial filmography ==
- L'Infante à la rose (1923) - Olive de Romanin
- Mayerling (1936) - L'impératrice Élisabeth
- Samson (1936) - La Marquise d'Andeline
- Forty Little Mothers (1936) - Mme Granval, La directrice
- Southern Mail (1937) - La mère
- L'amour veille (1937) - Madame de Juvigny
- Woman of Malacca (1937) - Lady Patricia Brandmore
- The Lie of Nina Petrovna (1937) - Baroness Engern
- Êtes-vous jalouse? (1938) - Gabrielle Brunois
- Mollenard (1938) - Mme. Mollenard
- Monsieur Breloque Has Disappeared (1938) - La baronne Granger
- Le drame de Shanghaï (1938) - La directrice du collège
- Mother Love (1938) - Adrienne
- A Foolish Maiden (1938) - La mère de Gisèle
- Behind the Facade (1939) - Madame Bernier
- The End of the Day (1939) - Madame Chabert
- The Man Who Seeks the Truth (1940) - Adrienne
- False Alarm (1940) - Madame Ancelot
- Sarajevo (1940) - L'archiduchesse Marie-Thérèse (et)
- Premier rendez-vous (1941) - La directrice de l'orphelinat
- The Newspaper Falls at Five O'Clock (1942) - Mademoiselle Lebeau
- Soyez les bienvenus (1942) - Madame Boisleroi
- L'appel du bled (1942) - Madame Darbois
- Patricia (1942) - Mademoiselle Pressac - Tante Laurie
- The Wolf of the Malveneurs (1943) - Magda
- Strange Inheritance (1943) - Gérardine Éloi
- The Phantom Baron (1943) - La comtesse de Saint-Helie
- Échec au roy (1945) - Madame de Maintenon
- Paris Frills (1945) - Solange
- The Angel They Gave Me (1946) - La comtesse de Cébrat
- Goodbye Darling (1946) - Constance
- Désarroi (1947) - Madame Meillan
- Mirror (1947) - Madame Puc
- Monsieur Vincent (1947) - La présidente Groussault
- Ruy Blas (1948) - La duchesse d'Albuquerque
- Une grande fille toute simple (1948) - Tante Edmée
- Les Parents terribles (1948) - Tante Léo
- Manon (1949) - Mme Agnès
- Tomorrow Is Too Late (1950) - La direttrice
- Ballerina (1950) - Aunt
- Born of Unknown Father (1950) - Mme. Mussot
- La Vérité sur Bébé Donge (1952) - Madame D'Ortemont
- So Little Time (1952) - Madame de Malvines
- Judgement of God (1952) - La margrave Josépha
- Son of the Hunchback (1952) - Contessa Lagardere
- Little Boy Lost (1953) - Mother Superior
- Traviata '53 (1953) - Signora Zoe
- Act of Love (1953, aka Un acte d'amour) - Adèle Lacaud
- Madame du Barry (1954) - La Gourdan
- Le fil à la patte (1954) - La baronne Du Verger - la mère de Viviane
- The Two Orphans (1954) - La Frochard
- Nagana (1955) - Mme Larguillière
- Pity for the Vamps (1956) - Éléonore Davis
- Mitsou (1956) - La baronne
- Les Espions (1957) - Madame Andrée - l'infirmière
- Resurrection (1958) - Kitajewa
- Polikuschka (1958) - Herrin
- Drôles de phénomènes (1959) - Madame Marcevault
- Magnificent Sinner (1959) - La directrice de l'institute Smolny
- Climats (1962) - Mme Cheverny, la mère d'Isabelle
- Un singe en hiver (1962) - Victoria
- Gigot (1962) - Madame Brigitte
- Germinal (1963) - La grand-mère de Catherine
- Monsieur (1964) - La belle-mère
- Cyrano and d'Artagnan (1964) - Françoise de Mauvières
- Thomas the Impostor (1965) - La cartomancienne
- Un mari à prix fixe (1965) - Mme Reinhoff, mère

== Theatre ==
- Chaîne anglaise by Camille Oudinot and Abel Hermant, Théâtre du Vaudeville (1906)
- Les Jacobines by Abel Hermant, Théâtre du Vaudeville (1907)
- Chérubin by Francis de Croisset, Théâtre Fémina (1908)
- La Sonate à Kreutzer by Fernand Nozière and Alfred Savoir (1910)
- Bel Ami (1912)
- Les Éclaireuses by Maurice Donnay, Comédie Marigny (1913)
- L'Épervier by Francis de Croisset, Théâtre de l'Ambigu (1914)
- Un homme en habit by André Picard and Yves Mirande, Théâtre des Variétés (1920)
- Comédienne by Jacques Bousquet, Paul Armont, Théâtre des Nouveautés (1921)
- Trois et une by Denys Amiel, Théâtre Saint-Georges (1932)
- Espoir by Henry Bernstein, Théâtre du Gymnase, with Claude Dauphin, Victor Francen and Renée Devillers, (1934)
- La vie est si courte by Léopold Marchand, Théâtre Pigalle (1936)
- Électre by Jean Giraudoux, Théâtre de l'Athénée (1937)
- Les Parents terribles by Jean Cocteau, Théâtre des Ambassadeurs (1938)
- La Machine à écrire by Jean Cocteau (1941)
- Le Dîner de famille by Jean Bernard-Luc, Théâtre de la Michodière (1944)
