= Nathalie Nattier =

French actress (1925–2010)

- Born: 19 May 1925; Paris, France
- Died: 19 June 2010 (aged 85); Lagny-sur-Marne, France
- Other name: Nathalie Belaieff
- Occupation: Actress
- Years active: 1943–2003 (film)

Nathalie Nattier (French pronunciation: [natali natje]; 1925–2010) was a French film actress.

== Selected filmography ==
- Gates of the Night (1946)
- Patrie (1946)
- Strange Fate (1946)
- Special Mission (1946)
- The Idiot (1946)
- Last Chance Castle (1947)
- The Barton Mystery (1949)
- Oriental Port (1950)
- Street Without a King (1950)
- Shot at Dawn (1950)
- Moumou (1951)
- Piédalu in Paris (1951)
- Full House (1952)
- Monsieur Taxi (1952)
- The Cucuroux Family (1953)
- Joséphine, ange gardien (2002) / 1 Episode
- Love Me If You Dare (2003)

== Bibliography ==
- Goble, Alan. The Complete Index to Literary Sources in Film. Walter de Gruyter, 1999.
