= The Revenge of Roger =

1946 film

- Directed by: André Cayatte
- Written by: Charles Spaak; André Cayatte
- Based on: Roger la Honte by Jules Mary
- Produced by: Ayres d'Aguiar
- Starring: Lucien Coëdel; María Casares; Paul Bernard
- Cinematography: Robert Lavallée
- Edited by: Germaine Fouquet
- Music by: René Sylviano
- Production company: Gray-Film
- Distributed by: Gray-Film
- Release date: 23 October 1946
- Country: France
- Language: French

The Revenge of Roger (French: La revanche de Roger la Honte) is a 1946 French historical crime film directed by André Cayatte and starring Lucien Coëdel, María Casares and Paul Bernard. The film is based on a novel by Jules Mary. It was a sequel to the film Roger la Honte also directed by Cayatte which had been shot in 1945 but was released in 1946. The film's sets were designed by the art director Jacques Colombier.

== Main cast ==
- Lucien Coëdel as William Farnell / Roger Laroque
- María Casares as Julia de Terrenoire
- Paul Bernard as Luversan
- Paulette Dubost as Victoire
- Louis Salou as Le commissaire Lacroix
- Rellys as Tristot
- André Gabriello as Pivolot
- Jean Tissier as Le baron de Cé
- Jean Desailly as Raymond de Noirville
- Simone Valère as Suzanne Laroque

== Bibliography ==
- Goble, Alan. The Complete Index to Literary Sources in Film. Walter de Gruyter, 1999.
