= E.G. de Meyst =

Belgian film director and screenwriter

Émile-Georges De Meyst (1902–1989) was a Belgian film director and screenwriter.

== Selected filmography ==
- Soldiers without Uniforms (1944)
- Monsieur Wens Holds the Trump Cards (1947)
