= Folies-Bergère (1957 film) =

1957 film

- Directed by: Henri Decoin
- Written by: Jacques Companéez; Henri Decoin; Georges Tabet; André Tabet
- Produced by: Lucien Masson; Jacques Roitfeld
- Starring: Eddie Constantine; Zizi Jeanmaire; Nadia Gray
- Cinematography: Pierre Montazel
- Edited by: Claude Durand
- Music by: Philippe-Gérard
- Production companies: La Société des Films Sirius; Les Productions Jacques Roitfeld
- Distributed by: La Société des Films Sirius
- Release date: 9 January 1957
- Running time: 102 minutes
- Country: France
- Language: French

Folies-Bergère is a 1957 French musical comedy film directed by Henri Decoin and starring Eddie Constantine, Zizi Jeanmaire and Nadia Gray. It was shot in Technicolor with location shooting at the Folies-Bergère. The film's sets were designed by the art director Jacques Colombier.

== Synopsis ==
An American soldier on leave in Paris heads to the Folies-Bergère as a lover of music hall. He meets and falls in love with the dancer Claudie and marries her. After leaving the army and attempting a career as a performer, he finds he is overshadowed by his wife's success and quarrels with her. He becomes attracted to a rising star Suzy and flirts with her to make his wife jealous.

== Cast ==
- Eddie Constantine as Bob Wellington
- Zizi Jeanmaire as Claudie
- Nadia Gray as Suzy Morgan
- Yves Robert as Jeff
- Jacques Morel as Roland
- Édith Georges as Rita
- Nadine Tallier as Sonia
- Serge Perrault as Max
- Robert Pizani as Clairval
- Jacques Tarride as Adjoint du maire
- Jeff Davis as Harry
- Paul Barge as Concierge de l'hotel
- Jacques Castelot as Philippe Loiselet
- Pierre Mondy as Roger

== Bibliography ==
- Rège, Philippe. Encyclopedia of French Film Directors, Volume 1. Scarecrow Press, 2009.
