= As Long as I Live (1946 film) =

1946 film

- Directed by: Jacques de Baroncelli
- Written by: Pierre Brive; Jacques Companéez; Alex Joffé; Marc-Gilbert Sauvajon; Solange Térac
- Produced by: Carlo Bugiani; Lucien Masson; Alexandre Mnouchkine
- Starring: Edwige Feuillère; Jacques Berthier; Jean Debucourt
- Cinematography: Christian Matras
- Edited by: Paula Neurisse
- Music by: Wal Berg
- Production company: Les Films Ariane
- Distributed by: Pathé
- Release date: 21 January 1946
- Running time: 80 minutes
- Countries: France; Italy
- Language: French

As Long as I Live (French: Tant que je vivrai) is a 1946 French-Italian drama film directed by Jacques de Baroncelli and starring Edwige Feuillère, Jacques Berthier and Jean Debucourt. The film's sets were designed by the art director Guy de Gastyne.

== Synopsis ==
A wild-living woman on the run from the police falls in love with a consumptive pavement artist.

== Main cast ==
- Edwige Feuillère as Ariane
- Jacques Berthier as Bernard Fleuret
- Jean Debucourt as Jean Marail
- Marguerite Deval as La marquise
- Germaine Kerjean as Madame Levallois
- Georges Lannes as Miguel Brennan
- Margo Lion as L'infirmière
- Germaine Michel as Aubergiste
- Maurice Nasil as Jacquelin
- Freddy Alberti as Band Leader
- Pierre Juvenet as Le docteur Monnier

== Bibliography ==
- Dayna Oscherwitz & MaryEllen Higgins. The A to Z of French Cinema. Scarecrow Press, 2009.
