= Jean-Jacques Delbo =

French actor (1909–1996)

- Born: 10 January 1909; Paris, France
- Died: 20 May 1996 (aged 87); Nice, France
- Occupation: Actor
- Years active: 1936-1990

Jean-Jacques Delbo (10 January 1909 – 20 May 1996) was a French actor. He appeared in more than sixty films from 1936 to 1990.

== Filmography ==
Year	Title	Role	Notes
1943	The Exile's Song	Le complice de Riedgo	
1943	The Stairs Without End	Albert	
1943	The Man Who Sold His Soul	Armand	
1943	Feu Nicolas	Villier	
1945	Mademoiselle X		
1945	The Last Metro		
1945	Majestic Hotel Cellars	Enrico Fualdès	
1946	Goodbye Darling	Ricardo	
1946	Une femme coupée en morceaux		
1946	That's Not the Way to Die	Piere Vanier	
1946	Devil and the Angel	Lenoir	
1947	Six Hours to Lose	Claude	
1947	Copie conforme	Oscar	
1947	A Cop	Zattore	
1947	Secret Cargo	Carlos Mendoza	
1948	Fort de la solitude	François	
1948	Judicial Error	Stefano	
1948	Memories Are Not for Sale	Max	
1950	The Ferret	Ludovic	
1950	The King of the Bla Bla Bla	Loustot	
1951	The Two Girls	Pierre Manin	
1953	Minuit... Quai de Bercy	Martin, le masseur	
1953	Their Last Night	Antoine Pérez	
1954	Royal Affairs in Versailles	Monsieur de la Motte	
1954	La soupe à la grimace	Godby	
1955	Napoléon	Le général Becker	Uncredited
1955	The Babes Make the Law	Le truand qui bat Nathalie	
1955	Pas de coup dur pour Johnny	Jérôme	
1955	L'impossible Monsieur Pipelet	Monsieur Francis	
1955	The Little Rebels	Un joueur de belote	
1956	If Paris Were Told to Us	Monsieur de la Personne	
1956	Cela s'appelle l'aurore	Gorzone	
1957	Mademoiselle and Her Gang	O'Connor	
1958	Le souffle du désir	Freddy	
1958	Filles de nuit		
1958	The Day the Sky Exploded	Sergei Boetnikov	
1958	En bordée	Max	
1959	The Big Chief	M. Jumelin	
1959	Menschen im Hotel	1. Portier	
1960	The Thousand Eyes of Dr. Mabuse	Cornelius' Butler	
1960	Brandenburg Division	Secret Service Man	
1961	Bernadette of Lourdes	Le commissaire Jacomet	
1961	The Count of Monte Cristo		
1961	Riviera Story		
1961	Erik the Conqueror	Olaf	
1962	La Fayette	L'exempt	
1963	Any Number Can Win	Le chorégraphe	Uncredited
1963	L'attico		
1963	Chair de poule	Joubert	
1963	La bande à Bobo		
1967	All Mad About Him	L'attaché	
1967	The Blonde from Peking	Monsieur Olsen	
1968	The Biggest Bundle of Them All	Train Engineer	Uncredited
1971	Perched on a Tree	Le yachtman	
1971	Without Apparent Motive	Le supérieur / Commissioner	
1975	The Common Man	Le médecin-légiste	
1980	Lulu	Doctor Goll	
1990	Wings of Fame		(final film role)
