= The Idiot (1946 film) =

1946 film

- Directed by: Georges Lampin
- Written by: Georges Raevsky; Charles Spaak
- Based on: The Idiot by Fyodor Dostoevsky
- Produced by: Sacha Gordine
- Starring: Edwige Feuillère; Lucien Coëdel; Jean Debucourt
- Cinematography: Christian Matras
- Edited by: Léonide Azar
- Music by: V. de Butzow; Maurice Thiriet
- Production companies: Films Sacha Gordine; La Magie Films
- Distributed by: Les Films Osso
- Release date: 7 June 1946
- Running time: 101 minutes
- Country: France
- Language: French
- Box office: 1,079,256 admissions (France)

The Idiot (French: L'idiot) is a 1946 French drama film directed by Georges Lampin and starring Edwige Feuillère, Lucien Coëdel and Jean Debucourt. It is an adaptation of Fyodor Dostoevsky's novel The Idiot. The film's sets were designed by Léon Barsacq, credited as the art director. It was shot at the Epinay and Neuilly Studios in Paris.

== Cast ==
- Edwige Feuillère as Nastasia Filipovna
- Lucien Coëdel as Rogogine
- Jean Debucourt as Totsky
- Sylvie as Madame Ivolguine
- Gérard Philipe as Le prince Mychkine
- Nathalie Nattier as Aglaé Epantchine
- Jane Marken as Naria
- Maurice Chambreuil as Le général Epantchine
- Michel André as Gania Ivolguine
- Elisabeth Hardy as Sophie Ivolguine
- Roland Armontel as Louliane Timofeievitch Lebediev l'ivrogne
- Mathilde Casadesus as Adélaïde Epantchine
- Janine Viénot as Alexandra Epantchine
- Tramel as Ivolguine
- Marguerite Moreno as La générale Elisabeth Prokofievna Epantchine
- Danielle Godet
- Rodolphe Marcilly
- Maurice Régamey
- Victor Tcherniavsky
- Charles Vissières
- Georges Zagrebelsky

== Bibliography ==
- Dayna Oscherwitz & MaryEllen Higgins. The A to Z of French Cinema. Scarecrow Press, 2009.
