= Wal-Berg =

French composer and conductor

Voldemar Rosenberg, better known by his stage name Wal-Berg (born October 13, 1910, Istanbul - July 12, 1994, Suresnes) was a French composer and conductor.

Rosenberg studied piano at the Berlin Conservatory and then attended the Paris Conservatory, where he studied harmony, composition, and conducting under Samuel Rousseau, Noel Gallon, Henri Rabaud, Philippe Gaubert, and Pierre Monteux.

From 1932 to 1936, he orchestrated for Polydor Records recordings, and composed songs performed by Marlene Dietrich (Moi je m'ennuie, Assez, Embrasse-moi). In the 1930s he was involved with the recordings of stars of the era such as Jean Sablon, Josephine Baker, Charles Trenet, Leo Marjane, and Damia. He also wrote film music, e.g. for the film Katia (with Danielle Darrieux).

After the fall of France in 1940, during World War II, Wal-Berg left France, for Monte Carlo, where he conducted symphonic jazz concerts, whose programs included George Gershwin and Cole Porter alongside Maurice Ravel and Claude Debussy. He also worked with ORTF on a series of radio broadcasts, in which he conducted orchestras backing soloists such as Yehudi Menuhin and Andres Segovia.

In the 1950s, he toured widely in Europe as a conductor with Victoria de Los Angeles and Segovia, and worked in France with Janine Micheau, Mathé Altéry, Roger Bourdin, Stéphane Grappelli, and at the Opéra de Lille with Mado Robin and Christian Ferras.

He composed more than 300 pieces for symphony orchestra and scored about forty films.

== Filmography ==
- Katia (1938)
- The Innocent (1938)
- The Rebel (1938)
- The World Will Tremble (1939)
- False Alarm (1940)
- As Long as I Live (1946)
- Destiny Has Fun (1947)
- After the Storm (1948)
- Guilty? (1951)
