= Roger la Honte (1933 film) =

1933 film

- Directed by: Gaston Roudès
- Written by: André Cayatte
- Based on: Roger la Honte by Jules Mary
- Starring: Constant Rémy; Germaine Rouer; France Dhélia
- Cinematography: Jacques Montéran
- Edited by: Marthe Poncin
- Production company: Compagnie Cinematographique Continentale
- Distributed by: Compagnie Cinematographique Continentale
- Release date: 10 March 1933
- Running time: 95 minutes
- Country: France
- Language: French

Roger la Honte is a 1933 French historical drama film directed by Gaston Roudès and starring Constant Rémy, Germaine Rouer and France Dhélia. It is an adaptation of the 1886 novel of the same name by Jules Mary. The film's sets were designed by the art director Claude Bouxin.

== Cast ==
- Constant Rémy as Roger Laroque
- Germaine Rouer as Henriette Laroque
- France Dhélia as Julia de Noirville
- Marcelle Monthil as Victoire
- Olympe Bradna as Suzanne Laroque
- Samson Fainsilber as Lucien de Noirville
- Paul Escoffier as Le juge d'instruction
- Édouard Delmont as L'inspecteur
- Marcel Maupi as L'inspecteur
- Raymond Narlay as Le président des assises
- Georges Mauloy as Le commissaire aux délégations
- Henri Bosc as Luversan
- Jean Arbuleau

== Bibliography ==
- Goble, Alan. The Complete Index to Literary Sources in Film. Walter de Gruyter, 1999.
