= Jean Faurez =

French film director

- Born: 9 February 1905; Courbevoie, Hauts-de-Seine, France
- Died: 24 October 1980 (aged 75); Paris, France
- Occupations: Director, writer, producer
- Years active: 1936-1969 (film)

Jean Faurez (1905–1980) was a French film director, screenwriter and producer. During the late 1930s he worked as an assistant director.

== Selected filmography ==
- Opéra-musette (1942)
- Love Around the Clock (1943)
- Night Shift (1944)
- Girl with Grey Eyes (1945)
- Counter Investigation (1947)
- Les vagabonds du rêve (1949)
- The Loves of Colette (1948)
- A Change in the Wind (1949)
- Quai du Point-du-Jour (1960)
- La parole est au témoin (1963)

== Bibliography ==
- DeMaio, Patricia A. Garden of Dreams: The Life of Simone Signoret. Univ. Press of Mississippi, 2014.
- Rège, Philippe . Encyclopedia of French Film Directors, Volume 1. Scarecrow Press, 2009.
- Turk, Edward Baron . Child of Paradise: Marcel Carné and the Golden Age of French Cinema. Harvard University Press, 1989.
