= Roger la Honte (1922 film) =

1922 film

- Directed by: Jacques de Baroncelli
- Written by: Jacques de Baroncelli
- Based on: Roger la Honte by Jules Mary
- Starring: Rita Jolivet; Gabriel Signoret; Maggy Théry
- Cinematography: Alphonse Gibory
- Production company: Le Film d'Art
- Distributed by: Etablissements Louis Aubert
- Release date: 1922
- Country: France
- Languages: Silent; French intertitles

Roger la Honte is a 1922 French silent historical film directed by Jacques de Baroncelli and starring Rita Jolivet, Gabriel Signoret and Maggy Théry. It is an adaption of the novel of the same title by Jules Mary.

== Cast ==
- Rita Jolivet as Julia de Noirville
- Gabriel Signoret as Roger Laroque
- Maggy Théry as Suzanne Laroque
- Eric Barclay as Roger de Noirville
- Sylvie (actress) as Henriette Laroque
- Régine Dumien as Suzanne, enfant
- Roger Monteaux as L. de Noirville
- Roger Pineau as Roger de Noirville, enfant
- André Marnay as Luversan
- Paul Jorge as Le caissier
- Thomy Bourdelle
- Henri Chomette
- Mangin
- Noémi Seize

== Bibliography ==
- Goble, Alan. The Complete Index to Literary Sources in Film. Walter de Gruyter, 1999.
