= Devil and the Angel =

1946 film

- Directed by: Pierre Chenal
- Written by: Jacques Companéez; Louis Ducreux; Ernst Neubach
- Starring: Madeleine Sologne; Erich von Stroheim; Louis Salou
- Cinematography: Pierre Montazel
- Edited by: Monique Kirsanoff
- Music by: Paul Misraki
- Production company: France Cinéma Productions
- Distributed by: Transunivers Films
- Release date: 30 October 1946
- Running time: 107 minutes
- Country: France
- Language: French

Devil and the Angel (French: La foire aux chimères) is a 1946 French drama film directed by Pierre Chenal and starring Madeleine Sologne, Erich von Stroheim and Louis Salou. It was shot at the Billancourt Studios in Paris. The film's sets were designed by the art director Jean d'Eaubonne.

== Cast ==
- Madeleine Sologne as Jeanne
- Erich von Stroheim as Frank Davis
- Louis Salou as Furet
- Yves Vincent as Robert
- Claudine Dupuis as Clara
- Jean-Jacques Delbo as Lenoir
- Margo Lion as Marie-Louise - la gouvernante de Frank
- Pierre Labry as Gardel - un inspecteur
- Georges Vitray as Le directeur de la banque
- Marcel Mérovée as Doudou
- Gustave Gallet as Le secrétaire de Frank Davis
- Annette Poivre as La remplaçante
- Eugène Frouhins as Le domestique
- Dora Doll as La secrétaire de Lenoir
- Howard Vernon as Un homme de main de Furet
- Line Renaud as La chanteuse de cabaret

== Bibliography ==
- Arthur Lennig. Stroheim. University Press of Kentucky, 2003.
