= Trap for the Assassin =

1966 film

- Directed by: Riccardo Freda
- Screenplay by: Jean-Louis Bory
- Based on: Roger-la-Honte by Jules Mary
- Produced by: Robert de Nesle; Alvaro Mancori
- Starring: Georges Géret; Irene Papas; Jean-Pierre Marielle; Jean Topart
- Cinematography: Jean Tournier
- Edited by: Michèle Boëhm; Riccardo Freda
- Music by: Antoine Duhamel; Georges et Jean-Luc
- Production companies: Comptoir Français du Film Production; Mancori
- Distributed by: Regionale (Italy)
- Release date: 15 June 1966
- Running time: 105 minutes
- Countries: France; Italy
- Language: French

Trap for the Assassin (French: Roger la Honte) is a 1966 crime film directed by Riccardo Freda and starring Georges Géret, Irene Papas and Jean-Pierre Marielle. It is an adaptation of the 1886 novel Roger la Honte by Jules Mary.

== Cast ==
- Georges Géret as Roger Laroque
- Irene Papas as Julia de Noirville
- Jean-Pierre Marielle as Lucien de Noirville
- Jean Topart as Luversan
- Sabine Sun as Victoire
- Gabriele Tinti as Raymond de Noirville
- Germaine Delbat as La mère Brun - la servante de Larouette
- Marcel Cuvelier as Le médecin légiste

== Production ==
Trap for the Assassin was based on Roger la Honte, one of the most popular feuilletons by Jules Mary. The script for the film was adapted by Jean-Louis Bory, who was an admirer of Freda's work, having met him in 1962 in Paris. Bory claimed that he wrote the adaptation and dialogue exclusive to function with Freda's direction.

According to Freda and his assistant director Yves Boisset, Trapped for the Assassin was a project Freda really cared about. Shooting for the film took four weeks and used three cameras at once.

== Release ==
Trap for the Assassin was released in France on 17 May 1966. It was distributed theatrically in Italy by Regional as Trappola per l'assassino on 21 October 1966. Italian film historian Roberto Curti stated that the film had poor distribution and was hardly noticed by critics or audiences. It has been given an English title Trap for the Assassin despite that the film does not appear to have been released overseas.

== Reception ==
In France, Image et son's reviewer praised Freda's direction in the film "We would like that all...knew as much as Freda how to handle a camera (see the trail sequence) and its spectacular potential. That's what makes this cheap little film such a beautiful illusion and a definite pleasure" Gilles Jacob praised the film, but noted that "let's face it, we would not go see [the film], were it signed by Cayatte or Maurice Cloche."

== See also ==
- List of French films of 1966
- List of Italian films of 1966
