= Roger la Honte (1913 film) =

- Directed by: Adrien Caillard
- Based on: Roger la Honte by Jules Mary
- Starring: Georges Dorival; Paul Capellani; Henri Collen
- Production company: Pathé Frères
- Distributed by: Pathé Frères
- Release date: 1913
- Country: France
- Languages: Silent; French intertitles

Roger la Honte or A Man's Shadow is a 1913 French silent historical drama film directed by Adrien Caillard and starring Georges Dorival, Paul Capellani and Henri Collen. It is an adaption of the novel of the same title by Jules Mary, which has been filmed a further four times since.

== Cast ==
- Georges Dorival
- Paul Capellani
- Henri Collen
- Maria Fromet

== Bibliography ==
- Goble, Alan. The Complete Index to Literary Sources in Film. Walter de Gruyter, 1999.
