= Lucien Coëdel =

French actor (1899–1947)

- Born: 30 August 1899; Paris, France
- Died: 28 September 1947 (aged 48); Blaisy-Haut, Côte-d'Or, France
- Occupation: Actor
- Years active: 1935 - 1947 (film)

Lucien Coëdel (1899–1947) was a French film actor. He appeared in the title role in the historical film Roger la Honte and its sequel The Revenge of Roger. Coëdel made his screen debut in an uncredited role in Abel Gance's Lucrezia Borgia (1935), and gradually appeared in larger roles over the following years. His career really took off in the mid-1940s with several starring roles, but was cut short by his early death at the age of forty eight.

== Filmography ==
| Year | Title | Role | Notes |
|---|---|---|---|
| 1935 | Lucrezia Borgia | | Uncredited |
| 1936 | Nitchevo | Le radio | |
| 1937 | Le coupable | Un soldat | Uncredited |
| 1937 | The Messenger | L'agent | Uncredited |
| 1938 | Mollenard | Le bosco | Uncredited |
| 1939 | Nord-Atlantique | Pomme d'Amour | |
| 1939 | La Loi du Nord | Le portier au bal de charité | Uncredited |
| 1941 | Courrier d'Asie | Le mécano | |
| 1941 | Who Killed Santa Claus? | Desfosses | Uncredited |
| 1941 | Stormy Waters | Un marin du 'Cyclope' | Uncredited |
| 1941 | Portrait of Innocence | Le père de Jeannot | |
| 1941 | The Pavilion Burns | | |
| 1942 | Caprices | Le traître | |
| 1942 | Opéra-musette | Léon | |
| 1942 | La Symphonie fantastique | Le typographe | Uncredited |
| 1942 | Les inconnus dans la maison | Jo, le patron du "Boxing Bar" | |
| 1942 | The Newspaper Falls at Five O'Clock | Le capitaine Le Goard | Uncredited |
| 1943 | The Mysteries of Paris | Le Chourineur | |
| 1943 | Voyage Without Hope | Philippe Dejanin | |
| 1944 | Carmen | Garcia | |
| 1945 | Manon, a 326 | Rabouin | |
| 1945 | Resistance | Hans | |
| 1945 | The Bellman | Jean-Baptiste - le campanier | |
| 1946 | Roger la Honte | Roger Laroque | |
| 1946 | The Idiot | Rogogine | |
| 1946 | The Revenge of Roger | William Farnell alias Roger Laroque | |
| 1947 | Counter Investigation | Monsieur Charles | |
| 1947 | Une belle garce | Rabbas | |
| 1947 | A Cop | L'inspecteur Renaud - de la P.J. | |
| 1948 | The Charterhouse of Parma | Rassi, le chef de la police | |
| 1948 | La carcasse et le tord-cou | Louis dit 'La Carcasse' | (final film role) |

== Bibliography ==
- Goble, Alan. The Complete Index to Literary Sources in Film. Walter de Gruyter, 1999.
