= Paul Bernard (actor) =

French actor

- Born: 21 December 1898; Villeneuve-sur-Lot, Lot-et-Garonne, France
- Died: 4 May 1958 (aged 59); Paris, France
- Occupation: Actor
- Years active: 1922 - 1955 (film)

Paul Bernard (21 December 1898 – 4 May 1958) was a French actor. He appeared in thirty-five films, including A Friend Will Come Tonight (1946).

== Selected filmography ==
- The Mysteries of Paris (1922)
- Beauty of the Night (1934)
- Pension Mimosas (1935)
- The Phantom Gondola (1936)
- Bach the Detective (1936)
- Maria of the Night (1936)
- The Dark Angels (1937)
- Summer Light (1943)
- Voyage Without Hope (1943)
- Les Dames du Bois de Boulogne (1945)
- Girl with Grey Eyes (1945)
- Roger la Honte (1946)
- The Revenge of Roger (1946)
- A Friend Will Come Tonight (1946)
- Panic (Panique) (1947)
- The Damned (1947)
- Dark Sunday (1948)
- White Paws (1949)
- The Hell of Lost Pilots (1949)
- The Man Who Returns from Afar (1950)
- Prelude to Glory (1950)
- Mystery in Shanghai (1950)
- Darling Caroline (1951)
- The Most Beautiful Girl in the World (1951)

== Bibliography ==
- Ulrike Siehlohr. Heroines Without Heroes: Reconstructing Female and National Identities in European Cinema, 1945-1951. A&C Black, 2000.
