= Roger la Honte (novel) =

1886 novel

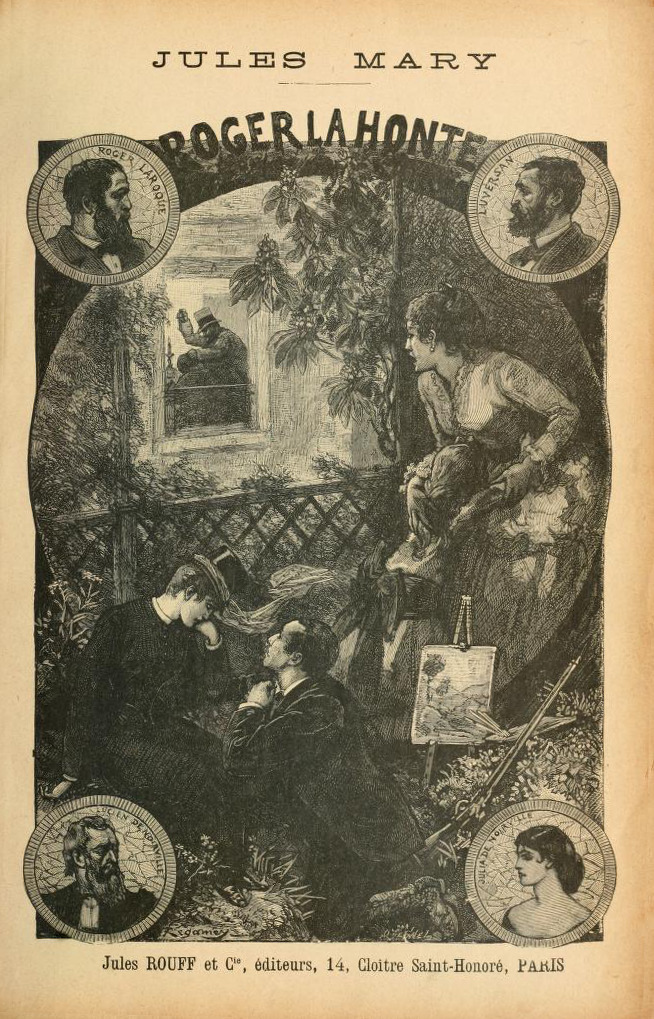
- Author: Jules Mary
- Language: French
- Genre: Melodrama
- Publication date: 1886
- Publication place: France
- Media type: Print

Roger la Honte is an 1886 novel by the French writer Jules Mary. Its melodramatic plot takes place around the time of the Franco-Prussian War. It is his best known work. In 1887-1889 he published a sequel The Revenge of Roger la Honte which was released in two parts.

Robert Williams Buchanan produced a play derived from the work in 1888, retitled "Jean the Disgraced" and premiered at the Elephant and Castle Theater.

== Adaptations ==
The novel has been turned into films on five occasions.

- Roger la Honte (1913 film), a French silent film directed by Adrien Caillard
- Roger la Honte (1922 film), a French silent film directed by Jacques de Baroncelli
- Roger la Honte (1933 film), a French film directed by Gaston Roudès
- Roger la Honte (1946 film), a French film adaptation directed by André Cayatte
- Trap for the Assassin, a 1966 French-Italian film directed by Riccardo Freda

== Bibliography ==
- Goble, Alan. The Complete Index to Literary Sources in Film. Walter de Gruyter, 1999.
