= Roger la Honte (1946 film) =

1946 film

- Directed by: André Cayatte
- Written by: André Cayatte
- Based on: Roger la Honte by Jules Mary
- Produced by: Ayres d'Aguiar
- Starring: Lucien Coëdel; María Casares; Paul Bernard
- Cinematography: Armand Thirard
- Edited by: Germaine Fouquet
- Music by: René Sylviano
- Production company: Gray-Film
- Distributed by: Gray-Film
- Release date: 13 March 1946
- Running time: 100 minutes
- Country: France
- Language: French

Roger la Honte is a 1946 French historical drama film directed by André Cayatte and starring Lucien Coëdel, María Casares and Paul Bernard. The film is an adaptation of the novel of the same name by Jules Mary. It was followed by a sequel The Revenge of Roger featuring many of the original cast and released the same year.

The film's sets were designed by the art director René Renoux.

== Cast ==
- Lucien Coëdel as Roger Laroque
- María Casares as Julia de Noirville
- Paul Bernard as Luversan
- Renée Devillers as Mme Laroque
- Rellys as Tristot
- Jean Tissier as Le baron de Cé
- Louis Salou as Le commissaire Lacroix
- André Gabriello as Pivolot
- Josée Conrad as La petite Suzanne
- Jean Debucourt as Monsieur de Noirville
- Paulette Dubost as Victoire
- Léon Walther as Le président du tribunal
- Léonce Corne
- Paul Demange
- Bernard Hubrenne
- Philippe Lemaire
- Charles Lemontier
- Marcel Pérès
- Madeleine Suffel

== Bibliography ==
- Goble, Alan. The Complete Index to Literary Sources in Film. Walter de Gruyter, 1999.
