= Louis Salou =

French actor

Louis Vincent Goulven Salou
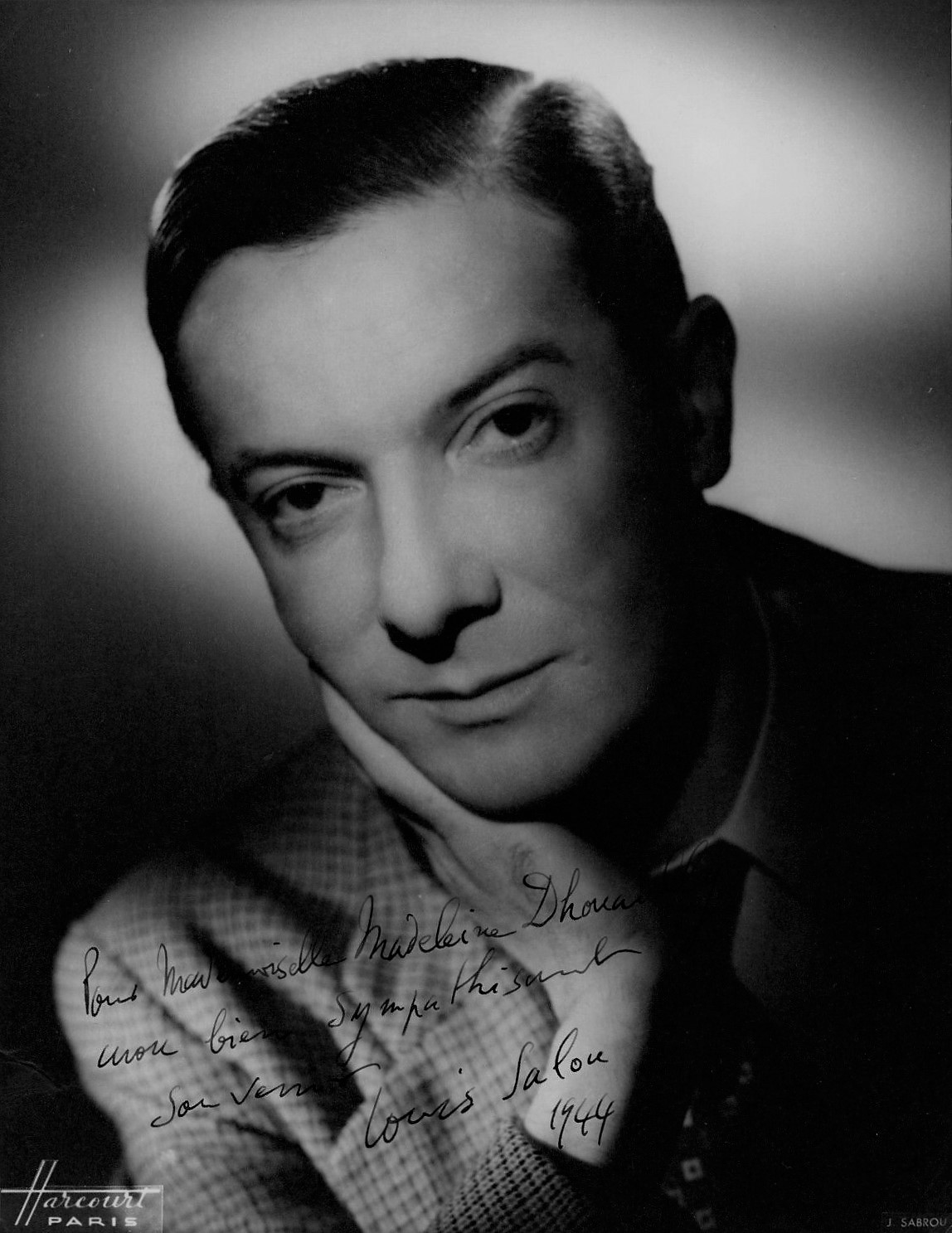
- Born: April 23, 1902; Oissel, France
- Died: October 12, 1948 (aged 46); Fontenay-aux-Roses, Paris, France
- Occupations: Stage and film actor

Louis Vincent Goulven Salou (23 April 1902 – 12 October 1948) was a French stage and film actor.

Louis was born in Oissel and died in Fontenay-aux-Roses, Paris.

== Selected filmography ==
- White Nights in Saint Petersburg (1938)
- First Ball (1941)
- Eight Men in a Castle (1942)
- The Newspaper Falls at Five O'Clock (1942)
- The Benefactor (1942)
- Bolero (1942)
- No Love Allowed (1942)
- Love Letters (1942)
- Voyage Without Hope (1943)
- The Wolf of the Malveneurs (1943)
- Mademoiselle Béatrice (1943)
- Traveling Light (1944)
- Father Serge (1945)
- Farandole (1945)
- Boule de suif (1945)
- Children of Paradise (1945)
- Devil and the Angel (1946)
- Roger la Honte (1946)
- The Revenge of Roger (1946)
- Sylvie and the Ghost (1946)
- Goodbye Darling (1946)
- Monsieur Wens Holds the Trump Cards (1947)
- Counter Investigation (1947)
- The Sharks of Gibraltar (1947)
- The Loves of Colette (1948)
- Eternal Conflict (1948)
- The Charterhouse of Parma (1948)
- Fabiola (1949)
- The Lovers of Verona (1949)
