= Madeleine Sologne =

French actress

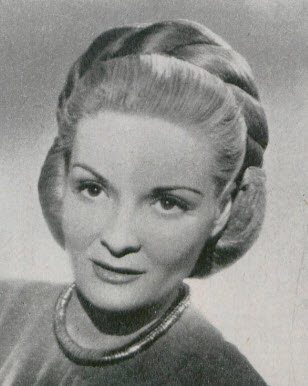
- Madeleine Sologne in 1948
- Born: 26 October 1912; La Ferté-Imbault, Loir-et-Cher, France
- Died: 31 March 1995 (aged 82); Vierzon, Cher, France
- Occupation: Actress
- Years active: 1936–1975 (film & TV)

Madeleine Sologne (12 October 1912 – 31 March 1995) was a French film actress.

Sologne was born Madeleine Simone Vouillon in La Ferté-Imbault, Loir-et-Cher. She was married to the art director Jean Douarinou. According to the art historian Michael Peppiatt, she had an affair with Marlene Dietrich.

== Selected filmography ==
- Adrienne Lecouvreur (1938)
- The Girls of the Rhône (1938)
- Raphaël le tatoué (1939)
- The World Will Tremble (1939)
- The Blue Danube (1940)
- Fever (1942)
- Sideral Cruises (1942)
- The Eternal Return (1943)
- Vautrin (1943)
- The Wolf of the Malveneurs (1943)
- Mademoiselle X (1945)
- Devil and the Angel (1946)
- Under the Cards (1948)
- Bernadette of Lourdes (1960)
- Le Temps des loups (1970) as Robert's mother

== Bibliography ==
- Crisp, C.G. The classic French cinema, 1930-1960. Indiana University Press, 1993
- Durgnat, Raymond. Jean Renoir. University of California Press, 1974.
