= The White Squadron =

The White Squadron may refer to:

- Lo squadrone bianco (The White Squadron), a 1936 Italian film based on the novel
- The White Squadron (1949 film) (L'escadron blanc), a French adventure film based on the novel
- L'Escadron blanc (The White Squadron), a 1931 novel by Joseph Peyré

== See also ==
- White Squadron (disambiguation)
