= Blanchette Brunoy =

French actress (1915–2005)

- Born: Blanche Bilhaud; 5 October 1915; Paris, Ile-de-France
- Died: 4 April 2005 (aged 89); Manosque, Alpes-de-Haute-Provence, Provence-Alpes-Côte d'Azur, France
- Years active: 1936–1998
- Spouse(s): Robert Hommet (?–1958); Maurice Maillot (1961–1968)

Blanchette Brunoy (5 October 1915 – 4 April 2005) was a French actress. She was born Blanche Bilhaud in Paris as the daughter of a physician, and died in Manosque, Alpes-de-Haute-Provence of old age.

== Career ==
Blanchette Brunoy appeared in over 90 film and television productions between 1936 and 1998. She is possibly best-remembered for her roles in such films as Jean Renoir's La Bête Humaine (1938) and Marcel Carné's La Marie du port (1950).

== Private life ==
She was the goddaughter of writer Georges Duhamel. As a young girl she studied acting at the Conservatoire de Paris. Blanchette Brunoy was married twice to both actors Robert Hommet (?–1958) and Maurice Maillot (1961–1968) until their deaths.

== Selected filmography ==
Year	Title	Role	Director
1936	Counsel for Romance	uncredited	Jean Boyer
1938	La Bête humaine	Flore	Jean Renoir
1939	Latin Quarter	Michèle	Pierre Colombier
1939	Love Cavalcade	Léonie de Maupré	Raymond Bernard
1939	The Duraton Family	Lisette Martin	Christian Stengel
1941	The Chain Breaker	Marie-Jo	Jacques Daniel-Norman
1942	Last Adventure	Jeanne Aubrin	Robert Péguy
1942	Private Life	Sylvie	Walter Kapps
1944	Traveling Light	Valentine	Jean Anouilh
1946	Solita de Cordoue	Marie	Willy Rozier
1947	Clockface Café	Louise Couturier	Henri Decoin
1947	The Crowned Fish Tavern	Maria	René Chanas
1947	The Other	Vera de Santis	Carlo Ludovico Bragaglia
1948	The Murdered Model	Laure	Pierre de Hérain
1948	Memories Are Not for Sale	Jeanne	Robert Hennion
1949	Vient de paraître	Jacqueline Fournier	Jacques Houssin
1950	La Marie du port	Odile Le Flem	Marcel Carné
1954	Tourments	Anne-Marie Duffot	Jacques Daniel-Norman
1963	Les Veinards	Madame Beaurepaire	Jack Pinoteau
1964	Anatomy of a Marriage: My Days with Françoise	Suzanne Aubry	André Cayatte
1964	Anatomy of a Marriage: My Days with Jean-Marc	Suzanne Aubry	André Cayatte
1964	Henri-Georges Clouzot's Inferno	Clotilde	Henri-Georges Clouzot
1982	Toutes griffes dehors	Francine	Michel Boisrond
1998	Comme elle respire	Madeleine	Pierre Salvadori
