= Pierrette Caillol =

French actress (1898–1991)

- Born: Pierrette Emmanuelle Caillol; 17 July 1898; Marseille, Bouches-du-Rhône, France
- Died: 8 June 1991 (aged 92); Nice, Alpes-Maritimes, France
- Occupation: Actress
- Years active: 1922 - 1961 (film)

Pierrette Caillol (1898–1991) was a French stage and film actress. She was married to the writer-director Yvan Noé.

== Filmography ==
Year	Title	Role	Notes
1922	The Mysteries of Paris	Rigolette	
1923	Monsieur Lebidois propriétaire	Madame Lafeuillette	
1924	Soirée mondaine	Annette	
1931	Le chanteur de Seville	Lola	
1931	The Man in Evening Clothes		
1933	Âme de clown	Suzette	
1934	Les hommes de la côte		
1936	Mademoiselle Mozart	Loulou	
1937	My Aunts and I	Monette	
1938	Thérèse Martin		
1939	Le château des quatre obèses	Ginette	
1939	L'étrange nuit de Noël	Violette	
1941	Those of the Sky	La romancière	
1942	The Murderer is Afraid at Night	Emilienne	
1942	Men Without Fear	Le précurseur	
1942	Six Little Girls in White	Charlotte Charan	
1943	Love Around the Clock	Hora	Uncredited
1948	Une mort sans importance	Mme Duvernay	
1948	Bagarres	Mme Leroux	
1949	A Change in the Wind		
1950	Dominique	Germaine Fougerolles	
1953	Les vacances finissent demain	Clémence	
1953	Napoleon Road	La femme dudocteur	
1957	Et par ici la sortie		
1957	Pas de grisbi pour Ricardo		
1961	Jugez-les bien		(final film role)

== Bibliography ==
- Goble, Alan. The Complete Index to Literary Sources in Film. Walter de Gruyter, 1999.
