= Paul Delmet =

French composer (1862–1904)

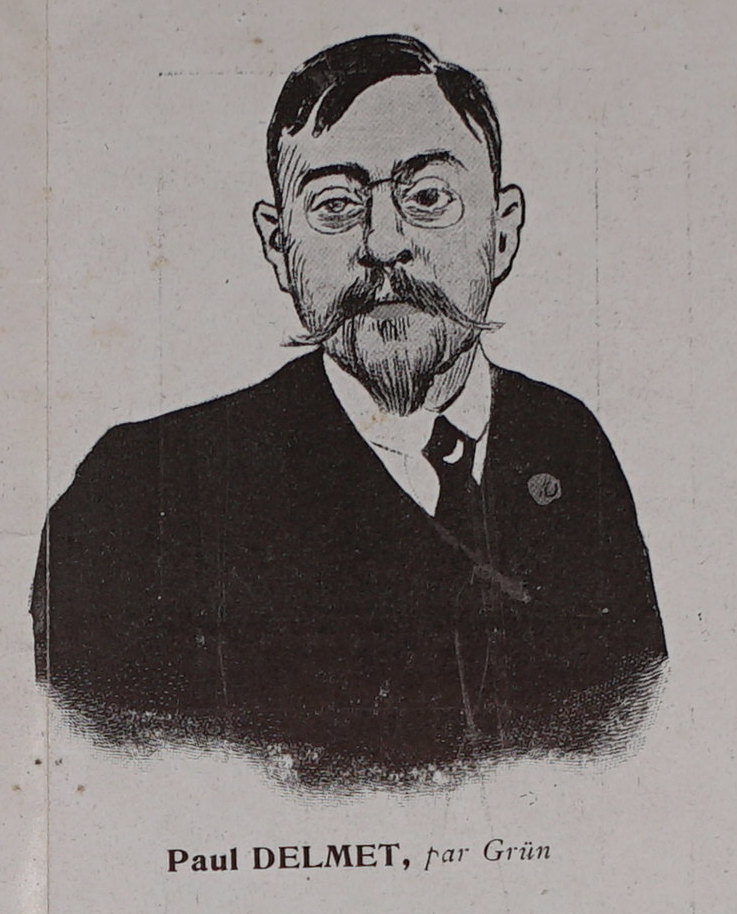
Paul Delmet

Paul Delmet (Paris 17 June 1862 – 28 October 1904 Paris) was a French composer.

== Biography ==
Delmet was portrayed by Tino Rossi in the 1950 film Sending of Flowers.

Delmet married and had five children. He died in October 1904.
