= Marcel Millet =

French novelist, poet, actor, and activist

Marcel Millet (30 May 1886, Cannes – 20 January 1970, Juvisy-sur-Orge) was a French novelist, poet and actor, who was also a libertarian activist.

In May 1922 he attended the International Congress of Progressive Artists and signed the "Founding Proclamation of the Union of Progressive International Artists".

== Acting career ==
He appeared in the 1941 film Vénus aveugle directed by Abel Gance. and the 1942 film Men Without Fear (French: Les hommes sans peur), directed by Yvan Noé.
