= René Lefèvre (actor) =

French actor

- Born: René Paul Louis Lefèvre; 6 March 1898; Nice, France
- Died: 23 May 1991 (aged 93); Poissy, France
- Occupation: Actor
- Years active: 1920s–1970s

René Lefèvre (French pronunciation: [ʁəne ləfɛvʁ]; born René Paul Louis Lefèvre; 6 March 1898 – 23 May 1991) was a French actor and writer. Throughout his career, he worked with several notable directors, like Jean Renoir, Jean-Pierre Melville, Jules Dassin, and René Clair.

== Career ==
Lefèvre made his debut in the 1920s when he acted in numerous films in small roles. His first film of note was Le Million, directed by René Clair in 1931. He later had the fortune of starring in the title role in The Crime of Monsieur Lange, directed by Jean Renoir.

Lefèvre was a left-wing actor and a major figure in the French Resistance during the German Occupation of France. He later became friends with Jean Vigo and recommended him as the director of films financed by a left-wing businessman.

He continued appearing in films until the late 70s, landing a small role in Jean-Pierre Melville's Le Doulos in 1962. He died in 1991 in Poissy.

== Partial filmography ==
- 1925: Knock (de René Hervil) - Jean - le voiturier
- 1927: The Marriage of Mademoiselle Beulemans (de Julien Duvivier) - Seraphím Meulemeester
- 1927: Fleur d'amour (de Marcel Vandal)
- 1927: Le sous-marin de cristal (de Marcel Vandal) - Comte des Hurlettes
- 1928: The Maelstrom of Paris (de Julien Duvivier) - Favergé
- 1928: Nile Water (de Marcel Vandal) - Arthur de Sorgepoix
- 1928: Not So Stupid (de André Berthomieu)
- 1929: Un soir au cocktail's bar (de Roger Lion) - Bar clerk
- 1929: The Ladies in the Green Hats (de André Berthomieu) - Ulysse Hiacinther
- 1929: Rapacité (de Albert Sauvage) (Short)
- 1929: Rapacité (de André Berthomieu) - Edmond Chabert
- 1930: Le Ruisseau (de René Hervil) - Un client
- 1930: The Road to Paradise (de Wilhelm Thiele et Max de Vaucorbeil) - Jean
- 1930: Les Deux mondes (de Ewald-Abdré Dupont)
- 1931: Mon ami Victor (de André Berthomieu) - Victor de Fleury
- 1931: The Million (de René Clair) - Michel Bouflette
- 1931: Jean de la Lune (de Jean Choux) - Jean de la Lune
- 1931: Moon Over Morocco (de Julien Duvivier - Jacques Le Guérantec
- 1931: On opère sans douleur (de Jean Tarride)
- 1932: A Dog That Pays Off (de Jean Choux) - René
- 1932: Monsieur, Madame and Bibi (de Jean Boyer et Max Neufeld) - Monsieur Paul Baumann
- 1932: Seul (de Jean Tarride) - Eugène Bricot
- 1932: Orange Blossom (de Henry Roussell) - Raymond de Méricourt
- 1932: His Best Client (de Pierre Colombier) - Gaston
- 1932: Buridan's Donkey (de Alexandre Ryder) - Georges
- 1933: Paprika (de Jean de Limur) - Paul Charvin
- 1933: La Paix chez soi (de André Hugon) (Short) - Triel
- 1934: The Ideal Woman (de André Berthomieu) - Grégoire Vachette
- 1934: Les Deux canards (de Erich Schmidt) - Gélidon
- 1934: L'Amour en cage (de Karel Lamač et Jean de Limur) - Charles
- 1935: The Scandalous Couple (de Georges Lacombe) - Jean
- 1935: Vogue, mon coeur (de Jacques Daroy) - Jim Ashbury
- 1936: Le pigeon (de Albert Riera) (Short)
- 1936: Ca n'a pas d'importance de Gaston Didier - court métrage
- 1936: The Crime of Monsieur Lange (de Jean Renoir) - Amédée Lange
- 1936: Le coup de trois (de Jean de Limur) - Monsieur Popolka
- 1936: Feu la mère de madame (de Germain Fried) (Short)
- 1937: Trois... six... neuf (de Raymond Rouleau) - Pierre
- 1937: Le gagnant (de Yves Allégret) (Short)
- 1937: Mes tantes et moi (de Yvan Noé) - Eloi
- 1937: Le Choc en retour (de Georges Monca et Maurice Kéroul) - Max de Bellecour
- 1937: Gueule d'amour (de Jean Grémillon) - René
- 1938: Nights of Princes (de Vladimir Strizhevsky) - Wassili Wronsky
- 1938: La Piste du sud (de Pierre Billon) - L'instituteur Saillant
- 1938: Sommes-nous défendus (de Jean Loubignac) - Le journaliste
- 1939: Place de la Concorde (de Karel Lamač) - Ripotot
- 1939: Feux de joie (de Jacques Houssin) - Roland
- 1939: Petite Peste (de Jean de Limur) - Jacques Chantelouve
- 1940: Musicians of the Sky (de Georges Lacombe) - Victor Barthélémy
- 1941: Parade en sept nuits (de Marc Allégret) - Uniquement dialoguiste
- 1942: Opéra-Musette (de René Lefèvre et Claude Renoir) - Lampluche
- 1942: The Woman I Loved Most (de Robert Vernay) - Georges, le fils de l'industriel
- 1943: À la belle frégate (de Albert Valentin) - Jean
- 1943: Arlette and Love de Robert Vernay) - Le notaire
- 1945: Box of Dreams (de Yves Allégret) - Marc
- 1945: Son dernier rôle (de Jean Gourguet)
- 1947: Le Bataillon du ciel (de Alexander Esway) - Baptiste - Film tourné en deux époques
- 1948: La carcasse et le tord-cou (de René Chanas) - Uniquement dialoguiste
- 1949: Daybreak (de Louis Daquin) - Dubard
- 1949: The White Squadron (de René Chanas) - L'adjudant Devars
- 1950: Un sourire dans la tempête (de René Chanas) - Uniquement dialoguiste
- 1951: Under the Sky of Paris (de Julien Duvivier) - Uniquement dialoguiste
- 1952: Alone in the World (de René Chanas) - François Hermenault
- 1952: Trois femmes (de André Michel) - M. Cachelin (segment "L'Héritage")
- 1953: Storms (de Guido Brignone) - Amédée Didier (uncredited)
- 1955: La Lumière d'en face (de Georges Lacombe) - Walter
- 1955: Bel Ami (de Louis Daquin) - Le banquier Walter
- 1957: La Garçonne (de Jacqueline Audry) - Professeur Vignabos
- 1957: Celui qui doit mourir (de Jules Dassin) - Yannakos
- 1958: It's All Adam's Fault (de Jacqueline Audry) - Norbert de Cazaubon
- 1958:Sois belle et tais-toi (de Marc Allégret) - Monsieur Raphael
- 1958: La liberté surveillée (de Henri Aisner et Vladimír Vlcek) - Benoît
- 1958: Le Gorille vous salue bien (de Bernard Borderie) - Commissaire Blavet
- 1959: Twelve Hours By the Clock (de Geza Radvanyi)
- 1959: Rue des prairies (de Denys de La Patellière) - Uniquement d'après son roman
- 1959: Le secret du Chevalier d'Éon (de Jacqueline Audry) - Le comte Antoine d'Éon
- 1962: Comme un poisson dans l'eau (de André Michel) - M. Dumesnil
- 1963: Le Doulos (de Jean-Pierre Melville) - Gilbert Varnove
- 1963: Une blonde comme ça (de Jean Jabely) - Doc
- 1963: La Foire aux cancres (de Louis Daquin) - L'inspecteur
- 1964: Un gosse de la butte (de Maurice Delbez) - Monsieur Bosquet
- 1966: Angelique and the King (de Bernard Borderie) - Colbert
- 1967: Un homme de trop (de Constantin Costa Gavras) - Colonel Guers
- 1976: Le Corps de mon ennemi (de Henri Verneuil) - Pierre Leclercq
- 1977: Un oursin dans la poche (de Pascal Thomas) - Pierre Leclercq
