= Michèle Martin (actress) =

French actress

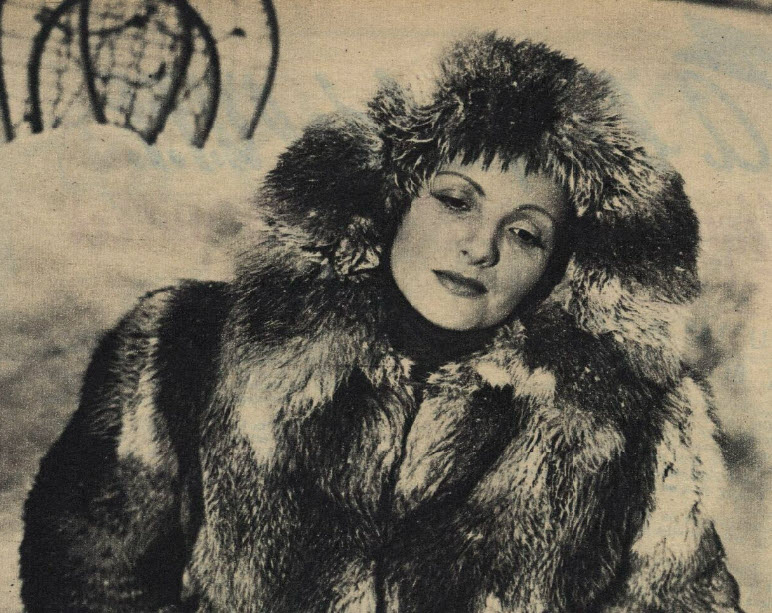
- Born: 29 November 1919; Clermont-Ferrand, Puy-de-Dôme, France
- Died: 15 January 2016 (aged 96); Vénissieux, Rhône, France
- Occupation: Actress
- Years active: 1944–1956 (film)

Michèle Martin (1919–2016) was a French film actress. She starred in several productions during the 1940s, some of them directed by René Chanas.

== Selected filmography ==
- Le bal des passants (1944)
- The Last Judgment (1945)
- A Cop (1947)
- The Crowned Fish Tavern (1947)
- Colonel Durand (1948)
- La carcasse et le tord-cou (1948)
- The White Squadron (1949)
- Un sourire dans la tempête (1950)

== Bibliography ==
- Goble, Alan. The Complete Index to Literary Sources in Film. Walter de Gruyter, 1999.
