= Call of the Flesh =

1930 film

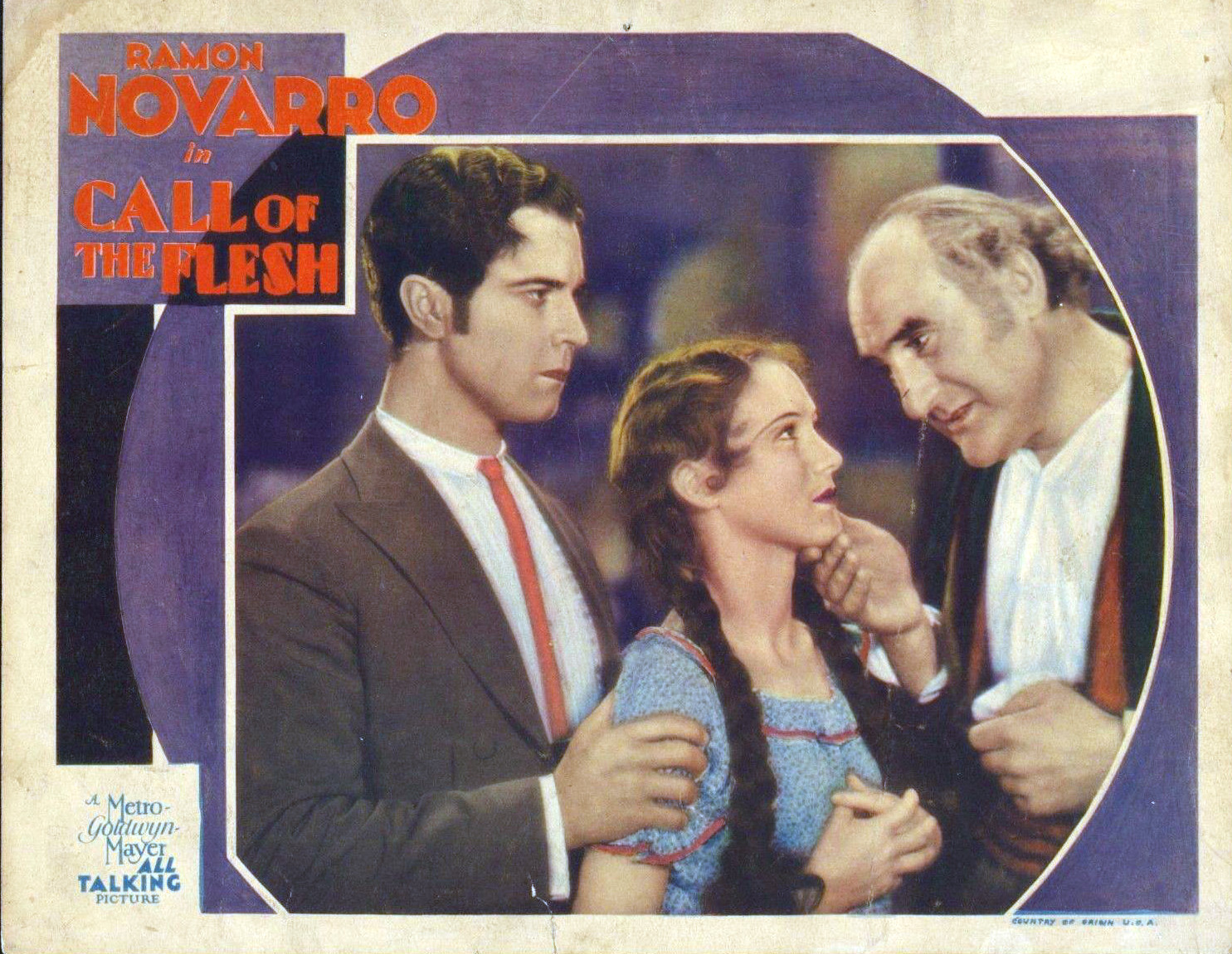
- Lobby card
- Directed by: Charles Brabin
- Written by: John Colton; Dorothy Farnum
- Starring: Ramon Novarro
- Cinematography: Merritt B. Gerstad
- Edited by: Conrad A. Nervig
- Distributed by: Metro-Goldwyn-Mayer
- Release date: August 16, 1930
- Running time: 100 minutes
- Country: United States
- Language: English
- Budget: $464,000
- Box office: $1,622,000 (worldwide rentals)

Call of the Flesh is a 1930 American Pre-Code musical film directed by Charles Brabin. The film stars Ramon Novarro, Dorothy Jordan, and Renée Adorée. It featured several songs performed by Novarro and originally included a sequence photographed in Technicolor.

== Plot ==
In Seville, Spain, a cantina is located across the street from San Agustín convent. At the convent, postulant Maria Consuelo Vargas (Dorothy Jordan) receives a visit from her brother, Captain Enrique Vargas (Russell Hopton). They have not seen each other in seven years, as he has been stationed in Africa. During the intervening time, their mother has died, which left Maria alone in the world, until she entered the convent. Enrique is thrilled that she will soon be married to God. Maria is enthralled by the music that comes from across the street – implying that she wants to explore life outside the convent – but Enrique prefers that she remain behind the safety of the convent walls, as he considers the outside world evil.

After Enrique leaves, Maria peers over the convent walls to watch Juan de Dios (Ramon Novarro) perform at the cantina. Later in the set, Juan sings and dances with his partner, Lola (Renée Adorée). After the set, Juan flirts with some female customers, which irks Lola. Juan walks Lola home, during which time he treats her badly, knowing that she is in love with him, and thus will tolerate the abuse.

At home, Juan meets with his music teacher, Esteban (Ernest Torrence). Esteban believes Juan has the potential to be a singer like he himself once was. Esteban squandered away his fame and fortune by reckless behavior – the same reckless behavior Juan now exhibits – which he is trying to steer Juan away from. If his old contacts will listen, Esteban plans to take Juan to Madrid so that he can truly become a singer under the management of one of the impresarios.

After a day outing at the market where he steals some oranges and some cloth and thus is trying to escape from the police, Juan runs into Maria in a private courtyard, she who he has never met. She has escaped from the convent and is stealing a dress from a clothes line to replace her convent garb. She leaves a token for the dress. She recognizes him. As she tells him she has no home, he, who is immediately attracted to her, takes her home with him. Maria eventually tells Juan that she has escaped from the convent to find “him”, as she has always been drawn to the magic that is his singing. Then, Lola shows up. Juan is able to make her go away without knowing that Maria is there.

Esteban believes Maria to be nothing more than a street harlot, but Juan is able to convince him that she is a child of God. Juan then tells Esteban that they will indeed go to Madrid, and bring Maria along as their housekeeper.

At the convent, Enrique is trying to find Maria. The Mother Superior (Nance O'Neil) tells him that as Maria had not yet taken her vows, she was free to leave. Maria being drawn to music may provide a clue as to her whereabouts. Then, Lola arrives – she has found a convent garment in Juan's room, the garment which Enrique and the Mother Superior recognize as Maria's. Enrique vows to travel to Madrid to kill Juan.

In Madrid, Juan, Esteban and Maria rent a three-bedroom flat that is managed by a music aficionado, La Rumbarita (Mathilde Comont). A once great singer used to reside there, which they all believe is karma. Later at the audition with impresario Mischa, Juan displays his arrogant attitude about what he sees as the greatness of his singing. Although the audition is technically sound, Mischa tells Juan that he has no soul in his singing, and that he needs to have his heart broken to achieve true greatness. As such, Mischa, will not accept him as a client. After Juan storms out in disgust, Esteban negotiates payment – all the money that he has – to Mischa to take Juan on as a client in lower level musical events, Juan not to know the financial arrangement. Mischa happily agrees, seeing this arrangement as a windfall.

Back at the flat, Juan, angry about Mischa's assessment, takes it out on Maria by berating her. However, seeing how loyal she is to him, Juan changes his tune and declares his undying love for her. They embrace. Later, he visits a priest to make arrangements for their marriage. As Juan tells Esteban and La Rumbarita of the wedding, they go off to buy items for an engagement party, but not before Esteban tells Juan that Mischa has arranged for him to sing Pagliacci that evening. Juan is excited, but believes that Mischa has just come to his senses, not knowing about Esteban and Mischa's financial arrangement.

While Juan is alone at the flat, Enrique tracks Juan down, ready to kill him. Although they initially argue about the situation with Maria, Enrique, with a little help from Lola, is able to convince Juan to send Maria back to the convent, as his act of love is stealing her away from her vow to God, and that she would always be seen as harlot if they were to get married, thus sending her to eternal damnation. Knowing that Maria will not go willingly, Juan convinces Maria that he no longer loves her as he has reconciled with Lola. A tearful Maria, now believing the outside world is evil as Enrique once said, leaves with her brother back to Seville and San Agustín.

Despite Juan's broken heart, Esteban is able to convince Juan to proceed with the performance of Pagliacci by telling him the truth about his and Mischa's financial arrangement. Juan's performance ends up being a triumph, with Juan emotionally spent after it. Mischa remarks that this Juan and the Juan at the audition are two totally different people. Mischa now wants to sign a legitimate contract with Juan. Regardless, Juan does not recover emotionally. As Esteban takes him back to Seville, Juan is bedridden, dying from a broken heart. Seeing what is happening to Juan, Lola decides to go to the convent to tell Maria the truth about their deception, which Lola now knows will lead to certain death for both Juan and Maria of broken hearts. Maria rushes to Juan's side, the two who enter into a loving embrace.

== Cast ==
- Ramon Novarro as Juan de Dios
- Dorothy Jordan as Maria Consuelo Vargas
- Ernest Torrence as Esteban
- Nance O'Neil as Mother Superior
- Renée Adorée as Lola
- Mathilde Comont as La Rumbarita
- Russell Hopton as Captain Enrique Vargas
- Sidney D'Albrook as Police Officer (uncredited)
- Julia Griffith as Dowager Empress Opera Spectator (uncredited)
- Fred Hueston as Opera Spectator (uncredited)
- Lillian Lawrence as Nun (uncredited)
- Adolph Milar as Police Officer (uncredited)
- Leo White as Impresario's Assistant (uncredited)
- Frank Yaconelli as Fruit Vendor (uncredited)

== Production ==
Filming of Call of the Flesh began on January 27, 1930, under the working title The Singer of Seville, and lasted through March. It was shot at Metro-Goldwyn-Mayer Studios in Culver City. Before the premiere, the title was changed to Call of the Flesh because the original title made it sound too much like a musical. Ramon Novarro apparently hated the new title.

This film marked Novarro's fourth film appearance with Renée Adorée, and his third with Dorothy Jordan. Charles Brabin had been the original director on Novarro's Ben-Hur before Brabin had been fired from that project; however, the firing had taken place before Novarro's hiring, and the two had thus not worked together on that film. Novarro would later claim that he, not Brabin, actually directed most of Call of the Flesh.

Novarro insisted that Renée Adorée be cast in the film opposite him despite the fact that she was extremely ill with tuberculosis. The actress suffered two hemorrhages during production which almost shut the project down. In one instance, Novarro tried to convince production supervisor Hunt Stromberg to relieve Adorée of her duties and reshoot her material with another actress, offering to waive his salary, but Stromberg insisted, against doctor's orders, that it would be too expensive. After completing her last scene, Adorée had a second hemorrhage again and lost consciousness; she was rushed to a sanitarium in La Crescenta, California. Although Adorée survived two more years, her health effectively ended her chances at a continued career. Call of the Flesh was her last film.

== Release and reception ==
Call of the Flesh was released on August 16, 1930. It received mixed reviews. Mordaunt Hall of The New York Times wrote it was well directed but described the plot as 'somewhat lethargic.' Variety said the film was uneven overall, and the New York Morning Telegraph said the storyline was 'banal.' Despite a growing distaste for musicals among the general public, the movie was financially successful.

In some theaters, the film was accompanied by a comedy titled The Great Pants Mystery. At the Capitol Theater in New York City, the film was accompanied by a performance by Stepin Fetchit of "Bye Bye Blues" staged by Chester Hale.

Call of the Flesh has not been released on DVD or video. It has been broadcast on television, and these versions of the film do not include any footage in Technicolor, which show Novarro's performance of an aria from Pagliacci. A still survives showing Novarro dressed as Pagliacci, posed alongside actor Ernest Torrence.

== Alternate-language versions ==
As with several American films made between 1930 and 1932, Call of the Flesh was remade into two alternate foreign-language versions. The process of filming alternate-language versions was common in the American film industry in the early 1930s and continued until improved dubbing technology became available. Novarro appears in both alternate versions, reprising his role as Juan de Dios Carbajal, and directed both of them. They were filmed using a different crew and supporting cast on the same sets at MGM Studios. A German-language version, also to be directed by Novarro, was never filmed for financial reasons.

=== La Sevillana or Sevilla de mis amores ===
La Sevillana was the Spanish-language version, co-starring Conchita Montenegro as María, along with José Soriano Viosca, Rosita Ballesteros and Michael Vavitch. Novarro's mother, Leonor Pérez Gavilán de Samaniego, makes her only film appearance as Mother Superior of the convent. Ramón Guerrero, who appears in the film, translated the original screenplay, and Novarro translated the song lyrics, assisted by Herbert Stothart. The film cost $103,437 and premiered at the Teatro Califórnia Internacionale in Los Angeles on December 5, 1930. The production of La Sevillana marked Novarro's first performance in Spanish, his first language. It is credited with boosting the career of Conchita Montenegro.

=== Le chanteur de Séville ===
Le chanteur de Séville was the French-language version, adapted by Yvan Noé and Anne Mauclair, co-starring Suzy Vernon, Pierrette Caillol, Georges Mauloy, Mathilde Comont (reprising her role from Call of the Flesh), Carrie Daumery and Ramón Guerrero. It cost $96,598 and premiered on February 21, 1931, at the Théâtre de la Madeleine in Paris.

== See also ==
- List of American films of 1930
- List of early color feature films
