= Men Without Fear =

1942 film

- Directed by: Yvan Noé
- Written by: Yvan Noé
- Starring: Madeleine Sologne; Claude Dauphin; Janine Darcey
- Cinematography: Fred Langenfeld
- Edited by: Jean Sacha
- Production company: France Productions
- Distributed by: Consortium du Film
- Release date: 7 October 1942
- Running time: 105 minutes
- Country: France
- Language: French

Men Without Fear (French: Les hommes sans peur) is a 1942 French drama film directed by Yvan Noé and starring Madeleine Sologne, Claude Dauphin and Janine Darcey. It was partly shot at the Victorine Studios in Nice in the Unoccupied Zone of France. The film's sets were designed by Jean Douarinou.

== Cast ==
- Madeleine Sologne as Madeleine
- Claude Dauphin as Henri Vermont
- Janine Darcey as Denise
- Jean Murat as Le professeur Bellecour
- Pierrette Caillol as Le précurseur
- Gérard Landry as Jacques Monval
- Marthe Régnier as La malade
- Georges Alain as Pierre
- Jean d'Yd as Un médecin
- Lucien Dalmas as Le chanteur
- Jean Daurand as Joseph
- Roger Hédouin
- Georges Lannes as Gérard
- Emmi Laurence
- Jean-François Martial
- Marcel Millet
- René Noel
- Arlette Perretière
- Jean Stoll as Un danseur
- Maurice Tricard as Le père de Madeleine
- Michèle Verneuil
- Pierrette Vial

== Bibliography ==
- Rège, Philippe. Encyclopedia of French Film Directors, Volume 1. Scarecrow Press, 2009.
