= Marlene (1949 film) =

1949 film

- Directed by: Pierre de Hérain
- Written by: Norbert Carbonnaux; Jean-Paul Le Chanois
- Starring: Tino Rossi; Micheline Francey; Lily Fayol
- Cinematography: André Germain
- Edited by: Henriette Wurtzer
- Music by: Francis Lopez
- Production company: Union des Distributeurs Indépendants
- Distributed by: Compagnie Française de Distribution Cinématographique
- Release date: 2 September 1949
- Running time: 100 minutes
- Country: France
- Language: French

Marlene (French: Marlène) is a 1949 French musical crime film directed by Pierre de Hérain and starring Tino Rossi, Micheline Francey and Lily Fayol. The film's sets were designed by the art director Paul-Louis Boutié.

== Cast ==
- Tino Rossi as Manuel Ceccaldi
- Micheline Francey as Marie-Hélène
- Lily Fayol as Suzy
- Raymond Bussières as Harris
- Jacques Castelot as Breteville
- Paul Azaïs as Le barman
- José Artur as La Puce
- Michel Barbey as Michel
- Pauline Carton as La vieille dame
- Mathilde Casadesus as Betty
- Pierre Duncan
- René Lacourt as Le pépiniériste
- Francis Lopez as Le pianiste
- Jean-Pierre Lorrain
- Robert Lussac as Le commissaire
- Julien Maffre as Un Corse
- Jean Mercure as Un gangster
- Raymond Meunier
- Marcelle Monthil as La mère
- Raphaël Patorni as César Luciani
- Marcel Rouzé
- Roger Saget as Le mari trompé
- Germaine Stainval as La dame du vestiaire
- André Valmy as Laurin
- Lilia Vetti as Lola

== Bibliography ==
- Maurice Bessy & Raymond Chirat. Histoire du cinéma français: 1940-1950. Pygmalion, 1986.
