= Love Around the Clock =

1943 film

- Directed by: Yvan Noé
- Written by: Yvan Noé; L.A. Pascal
- Produced by: Jean Faurez
- Starring: Gaby Morlay; Fernandel; Charles Trenet
- Cinematography: Raymond Agnel
- Edited by: Emma Le Chanois
- Music by: Roger Dumas; André Messier
- Production company: France Productions
- Distributed by: Les Films Vog
- Release date: 10 November 1943
- Running time: 99 minutes
- Country: France
- Language: French

Love Around the Clock (French: La cavalcade des heures) is a 1943 French comedy drama film directed by Yvan Noé and starring Gaby Morlay, Fernandel and Charles Trenet.

== Cast ==
- Gaby Morlay as La mère de Pierrot
- Fernandel as Antonin
- Charles Trenet as Charles
- Meg Lemonnier as Ginette
- Jean Chevrier as Le condamné
- Jean Marchat
- Jules Ladoumègue as Massardier
- Jean Daurand as L'ouvrier
- Jeanne Fusier-Gir as La femme de Léon
- André Le Gall
- René Noel as Roger
- Pierre Juvenet as Le serveur
- Grandjon as Pierrot
- Félix Oudart as Le maître d'hôtel
- Lucien Gallas as André
- Tramel as Léon
- Fernand Charpin as Monsieur Maurice
- Julien Bertheau as Récitant (voice)
- Simone Antonetti as La marchande de cigarettes
- Pierrette Caillol as Hora
- Mona Dol as Germaine
- Michel Roux as Pierrot
- Marthe Sarbel as La mère de Monsieur Maurice
- Simone Antonetti as La marchande de cigarettes
- Pierrette Caillol as Hora
- Mona Dol as Germaine
- Michel Roux as Pierrot
- Marthe Sarbel as La mère de Monsieur Maurice

== Bibliography ==
- Singer, Barnett. The Americanization of France: Searching for Happiness After the Algerian War. Rowman & Littlefield, 2013.
