= Come Down, Someone Wants You =

1951 film

- French: Descendez, on vous demande
- Directed by: Jean Laviron
- Written by: Jean Laviron
- Based on: Come Down, Someone Wants You by Jean de Letraz
- Produced by: Emile Darbel
- Starring: Noëlle Norman; Daniel Clérice; Paulette Dubost
- Cinematography: André Germain
- Edited by: Jeannette Berton
- Music by: Daniel White
- Production company: Eole Films
- Distributed by: Filmsonor
- Release date: 17 August 1951
- Running time: 89 minutes
- Country: France
- Language: French

Come Down, Someone Wants You (French: Descendez, on vous demande) is a 1951 French comedy film directed by Jean Laviron and starring Noëlle Norman, Daniel Clérice and Paulette Dubost. It is based on the 1946 play of the same name by Jean de Letraz.

The film's sets were designed by the art director Rino Mondellini.

== Cast ==
- Noëlle Norman as Sylvette de Vignolles
- Daniel Clérice as Francis Ardelles
- Paulette Dubost as Irène
- Jean Tissier as Léonard de Vignolles
- Jacques Dynam as Gilbert
- Jean-Jacques as Charley
- Christiane Sertilange as Loulou
- Pauline Carton as Ursule, la bonne
- Grillon as Le camionneur

== Bibliography ==
- Goble, Alan. The Complete Index to Literary Sources in Film. Walter de Gruyter, 1999.
- Marie, Michel. The French New Wave: An Artistic School. John Wiley & Sons, 2008.
