= Marie Albe =

French actress and journalist (1924–2021)

- Born: Léone Marie Madeleine Renouard; 29 May 1924; Soissons, France
- Died: 5 January 2021 (aged 96); Joué-lès-Tours, France
- Occupations: Actress; journalist

Marie Albe (29 May 1924 – 5 January 2021) was a French actress and journalist. She attended the University of Provence.

== Journalism ==
Albe worked for Radio Monte Carlo from 1952 to 1960, and subsequently, Radio France and France 3 Provence-Alpes.

== Filmography ==
=== Cinema ===
- Alone in the World (1952)
- Le Curé de Ballargue (1952)
- Le Club des 400 coups (1953)
- Napoleon Road (1953)
- Le Secret de sœur Angèle (1956)
- Le Naïf aux quarante enfants (1957)
- Les Fleurs de glai (1974)
- The Horseman on the Roof (1995)
- Nos amis les flics (2004)

=== Television ===
- La Bastide blanche (1997)
- Un étrange héritage (1997)
- L'Inventaire (1998)
- Le Châtiment du Makhila (2001)
- L'Arbre et l'Oiseau (2005)
- Le Maître qui laissait les enfants rêver (2007)
- Le Sang des Atrides (2010)
