= Without Trumpet or Drum =

1950 film

- Directed by: Roger Blanc
- Written by: Charles Bretoneiche
- Produced by: Martial Berthot
- Starring: André Gabriello; Gaby Morlay; Jules Berry
- Cinematography: Lucien Joulin
- Edited by: Charles Bretoneiche
- Music by: Charles Bretoneiche; Ginou Bretoneiche
- Production company: Général Films
- Release date: 13 June 1950
- Running time: 84 minutes
- Country: France
- Language: French

Without Trumpet or Drum (French: Sans tambour ni trompette) is a 1950 French comedy film directed by Roger Blanc and starring André Gabriello, Gaby Morlay and Jules Berry.

== Cast ==
- André Gabriello as André Berbezieux de Saint-Rozay
- Jules Berry as Le cousin
- Jean Parédès as Le fou
- Gaby Morlay
- Madeleine Rousset
- Daniel Clérice
- Anouk Ferjac
- Jean Vinci
- Roger Rafal
- Jean Témerson
- Robert Le Fort
- Nicky Charriére
- Roland Armontel
- Simone Delamare
- Catherine Fath
- Jacqueline Noëlle

== Bibliography ==
- Goble, Alan. The Complete Index to Literary Sources in Film. Walter de Gruyter, 1999.
