= Richard Pottier =

Austrian-born French film director

Richard Pottier (6 June 1906, in Graz – 2 November 1994, in Le Plessis-Bouchard) was a film director in France. He was born in the Austro-Hungarian Empire as Ernst Deutsch.

== Selected filmography ==
- If I Were Boss (1934)
- A Rare Bird (1935)
- Fanfare of Love (1935)
- Guilty Melody (1936)
- 27 Rue de la Paix (1936)
- The Secrets of the Red Sea (1937)
- Lights of Paris (1938)
- The World Will Tremble (1939)
- Mademoiselle Swing (1942)
- Eight Men in a Castle (1942)
- No Love Allowed (1942)
- Picpus (1943)
- Majestic Hotel Cellars (1945)
- Song of the Clouds (1946)
- Destiny (1946)
- The Uncatchable Mr. Frederic (1946)
- Vertigo (1947)
- The White Night (1948)
- Barry (1949)
- Two Loves (1949)
- Murders (1950)
- Casimir (1950)
- Darling Caroline (1951)
- Rendezvous in Grenada (1951)
- The Case Against X (1952)
- Imperial Violets (1952)
- The Beautiful Otero (1954)
- The Rebels of Lomanach (Les révoltés de Lomanach) (1954)
- The Lebanese Mission (1956)
- The Singer from Mexico (1957)
- Serenade of Texas (1958)
- Tabarin (1958)
- David and Goliath (1960)
- Il ratto delle sabine (1961)
