= Ketty Kerviel =

French actress

- Born: Antoinette Verenghien; 2 May 1916; Périgueux
- Died: 14 November 2009 (aged 93); Levallois-Perret
- Occupation: Actress
- Spouse: Jacques Daniel-Norman

Ketty Kerviel, real name Antoinette Verenghien (2 May 1916 - 14 November 2009), was a French actress.

== Filmography ==
- 1939 : Yamilé sous les cèdres by Charles d'Espinay
- 1945 : The Great Pack by Jean de Limur
- 1947 : Les Trois Cousines by Jacques Daniel-Norman
- 1948 : Le Diamant de cent sous by Jacques Daniel-Norman
- 1948 : If It Makes You Happy by Jacques Daniel-Norman
- 1949 : The Red Angel by Jacques Daniel-Norman
- 1951 : Dakota 308 by Jacques Daniel-Norman
- 1952 : Her Last Christmas by Jacques Daniel-Norman
