= Charles Exbrayat =

French writer (1906–1989)

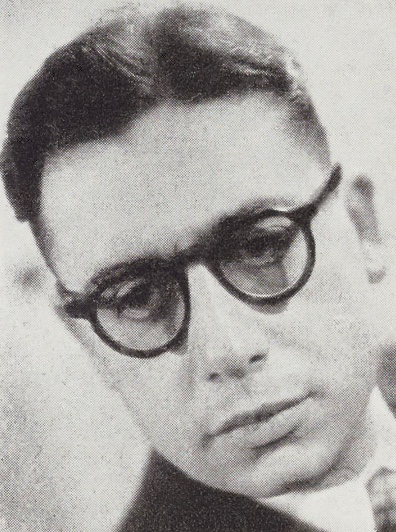
- Charles Ebrayat in 1940
- Born: Charles Exbrayat; 5 May 1906; Saint-Étienne, France
- Died: 8 March 1989 (aged 82); Saint-Étienne, France
- Occupation: detectives story writer
- Writing career
- Language: French
- Genre: humorous thrillers

Charles Exbrayat (5 May 1906 – 8 March 1989) was a French fiction writer. He published over 100 novels and short stories, most of them humorous thrillers. They were very popular and a considerable number were turned into films.

While living in Nice with his parents, he was studying to becoming a medical doctor, but then found his true calling as a writer.

His debut novel was Aller sans Retour (single fare, no return), written while in Geneva, before going to Paris. He was one of the most famous French authors of the illustrious "le Masque" collection. He wrote a number of novels set in Scotland (Imogene series) and in Italy. His other interests included gourmet food and fine wines.

== Honors and awards ==
Knight of the Order of Legion of Honour (1974)

== Bibliography ==
=== Imogène Collection ===
- Ne vous fâchez pas, Imogène!, Le Masque (1959)
- Imogène est de retour, Le Masque (1960)
- Encore vous, Imogène?, Le Masque (1962)
- Imogène, vous êtes impossible!, Le Masque (1963)
- Notre Imogène, Le Masque (1969)
- Les Fiançailles d'Imogène, Le Masque (1971)
- Imogène et la veuve blanche, Le Masque (1975)

=== Tarchinini Collection ===
- Chewing-gum et spaghetti, Le Masque (1960)
- Le Plus Beau des bersagliers, Le Masque (1962)
- Chianti et Coca-Cola, Le Masque (1966)
- Le Quintette de Bergame, Le Masque (1967)
- Ces sacrées Florentines, Le Masque (1969)
- La Belle Véronaise, Le Masque (1972)
- Des amours compliquées, Le Masque (1976)
- Mets tes pantoufles, Roméo, Le Masque (1983)

=== Other books ===
- Elle avait trop de mémoire, Le Masque (1957)
- La nuit de Santa Cruz, Le Masque (1957)
- Vous souvenez-vous de Paco?, Le Masque (1958)
- Ce mort que nul n'aimait, Le Masque (1958)
- L'inspecteur mourra seul, Le Masque (1959)
- Cet imbécile de Ludovic, Le Masque (1960)
- Amour et sparadrap, Le Masque (1960)
- Aimez-vous la pizza?, Le Masque (1960)
- Avanti, la mùsica!, Le Masque (1961)
- Des demoiselles imprudentes, Le Masque (1961)
- Les Blondes et Papa, Le Masque (1961)
- Méfie-toi, Gône!, Le Masque (1961)
- Le Quadrille de Bologne, Le Masque (1961)
- Dors tranquille, Katherine, Le Masque (1962)
- Une ravissante idiote, Espionnage 2^{e} série (1962)
- Le temps se gâte à Zakopane, Espionnage 2^{e} série (1962)
- Espion, où es-tu? M'entends-tu?, Espionnage 2^{e} série (1962)
- Olé !... Torero!, Le Masque (1963)
- Les Filles de Folignazzaro, Le Masque (1963)
- Quel gâchis, inspecteur!, Le Masque (1963)
- Les Douceurs provinciales, Le Masque (1963)
- Et qu'ça saute !, Le Masque (1963)
- On se reverra, petite!, Le Masque (1964)
- La Honte de la famille, Le Masque (1964)
- Les Messieurs de Delft, Le Masque (1964)
- Barthélemy et sa colère, Le Masque (1964)
- Vous manquez de tenue, Archibald!, Le Masque (1965)
- Le colonel est retourné chez lui, Le Masque (1965)
- Une petite morte de rien du tout, Le Masque (1965)
- Joyeux Noël, Tony, Service secret (1964)
- Mandolines et barbouzes, Service secret (1965)
- Les Dames du Creusot, Le Masque (1966)
- Plaies et bosses, Le Masque (1966)
- Le Voyage inutile, Le Masque (1966)
- Une brune aux yeux bleus, Le Masque (1966)
- Le Dernier des salauds, Le Masque (1967)
- Mortimer !... Comment osez-vous?, Le Masque (1967)
- La route est longue, Jessica, Éditions Rombaldi, coll. Romans - La Redoute (1968)
- «Au Trois Cassoulets», Le Masque (1971)
- C'est pas dieu possible Le Livre de Paris, Paris (1974)
- Le clan Morembert Livre de poche (1975)
- Pour ses beaux yeux Livre de poche (1975)
- Un matin, elle s'en alla, Edition Librairie générale française, coll. Le Livre de poche, Paris (1976)
- Ton amour et ma jeunesse Librairie des Champs-Elysées (1977)
- Chant funebre pour un gitan Le Masque (1978)
- Jules Matrat, Edition Librairie générale française, coll. Le Livre de poche, Paris (1979)
- Pour Belinda Librairie des Champs-Elysées (1979)
- Le château des amours mortes, Le Masque (1608), Paris (1980)
- La Lumière du matin, Le Livre de poche, Paris (1982)
- " Pouquoi tuer le pépé", le club des masques, Paris (1982)
- Le Château vert, Éditions J'ai lu, coll. J'ai lu, Paris (1987)
- Ceux de la forêt, Éditions J'ai lu, coll. J'ai lu, Paris (1988)
- Tu n'aurais pas, Margueritte Librairie des Champs-Elysées (1988)
- Félicité de la croix-rousse Librairie des Champs-Elysées (1989)
- Mademoiselle Évelyne, suivi de Les Amoureux du Ribatejo, Bayard, coll. Bonne soirée (1997)
- La Désirade
- Les soleils de l'automne

== Selected filmography ==
- The Midnight Sun (1943)
- The Island of Love (1944)
- Danger of Death (1947)
- The Woman I Murdered (1948)
- Five Red Tulips (1949)
- The Nude Woman (1949)
- Sending of Flowers (1950)
- One Only Loves Once (1950)
- Maria of the End of the World (1951)
- The Lovers of Marianne (1953)
- ‘’ Short and Sweet (Les Grands Moyens’’ (1976)

== Recognition ==
To honor writers who specialized in detective stories, the city of Saint-Étienne created a special prize to be attributed during their book festival and called it the Charles Exbrayat Prize.
