= Jericho (1946 film) =

1946 film

- Directed by: Henri Calef
- Written by: Claude Heymann; Charles Spaak
- Produced by: Sacha Gordine
- Cinematography: Claude Renoir
- Edited by: Madeleine Bagiau
- Production company: Films Sacha Gordine
- Release date: 13 March 1946
- Running time: 139 minutes
- Country: France
- Language: French

Jericho is a 1946 French war film directed by Henri Calef based on Operation Jericho. It was shot at the Epinay Studios of Eclair in Paris.

== Synopsis ==
During the Second World War the Royal Air Force and the French Resistance take part in a joint operation known as "Jericho" to free fifty civilians being held as hostages by the occupying German Army in Amiens.

== Cast ==
- Nadine Alari as Alice Noblet
- Roland Armontel as Muscat
- Jean Brochard as Michaud
- André Carnège as L'aumônier allemand
- Jacques Charon as Le comte Jacques de Saint-Leu
- Paul Demange as André Morget
- Yves Deniaud as Robert Detaille
- Paul Faivre
- Guy Favières as Le maire
- Gabrielle Fontan as Madame Michaud
- René Génin as Camille Duroc
- Albert Glado
- Jacques Henley
- Maxime Joal
- Pierre Larquey as Béquille
- Albert Michel as Le correspondent qui vient de Hollande
- Henri Nassiet as Le commandant Munchhausen
- Reggie Nalder
- Line Noro as Rosa Duroc
- Palau as Dietrich
- Fred Pasquali
- Raphaël Patorni as Batignolles
- Georges Paulais
- Raymond Pellegrin as Pierre, le fils du pharmacien
- Raymond Raynal
- Michel Salina
- Santa Relli as Simone Michaud
- Louis Seigner as Le docteur Noblet
- Robert Seller as Lucien Sampet
- Pierre Sergeol as L'acteur
- François Viguier
- Jean d'Yd as Un conseiller
- Pierre Brasseur as Jean-César Morin
- Alfred Baillou
- Jo Dest as Un policier allemand
- Rudy Lenoir as Petit rôle
- Julienne Paroli as La cliente à la pharmacie
- Howard Vernon as Un officier allemande

== Bibliography ==
- Rège, Philippe. Encyclopedia of French Film Directors, Volume 1. Scarecrow Press, 2009.
