= Tourments =

- Directed by: Jacques Daniel-Norman
- Written by: Jacques Daniel-Norman; Pierre Maudru
- Produced by: Vasco Films
- Starring: Paul Azaïs; Louis de Funès
- Cinematography: Roger Fellous
- Edited by: Nicole Marko
- Music by: Paul Misraki
- Distributed by: Mondial Films
- Release date: 23 April 1954 (France)
- Running time: 115 minutes
- Country: France
- Language: French

Tourments English: Agonies, is a French drama film from 1954, directed by Jacques Daniel-Norman, written by Jacques Daniel-Norman, starring Paul Azaïs and Louis de Funès.

== Plot ==
Jean-Jacques and Anne-Marie have adopted little Jean-Claude. The small family lives happily until the child's real mother decides she wants the boy back. She assigns a ruthless private detective to kidnap Jean-Claude.

== Cast ==
- Paul Azaïs : father Bizule, security guard of a construction site
- Louis de Funès : Eddy Gorlier, private detective
- Tino Rossi : Jean-Jacques Duflot, called: Tony Caylor, a once famous singer
- Blanchette Brunoy : Anne-Marie Duflot, wife of Jean-Jacques
- Jacqueline Porel : Simone Rebeira, Jean-Claude's real mother
- Charles Deschamps : Monsieur de Vandière, Anne-Marie's father
- Claudy Chapeland : Jean-Claude Duflot, the little boy
- Raymond Cordy : Jo Braitone
- Andrée Servilange : Madame of Prinjelles, head of the orphanage
- Renée Corciade : Madame Prestat
- Jean Berton : Victor, the majordomo
- Jackie Sardou
