= André Germain =

French cinematographer (1903–1988)

- Born: 17 May 1903; Montvicq, Allier, France
- Died: 30 December 1988 (aged 85); Paris, France
- Occupation: Cinematographer
- Years active: 1936–1969 (film)

André Germain (1903–1988) was a French cinematographer active from the mid-1930s to the late 1960s.

== Selected filmography ==
- Rail Pirates (1938)
- Beating Heart (1940)
- Love Cavalcade (1940)
- Beating Heart (1940)
- Son of France (1946)
- Destiny (1946)
- Vertigo (1947)
- If It Makes You Happy (1948)
- Two Loves (1949)
- Marlene (1949)
- The Man on the Eiffel Tower (1949)
- Casimir (1950)
- Murders (1950)
- The Patron (1950)
- Dakota 308 (1951)
- Come Down, Someone Wants You (1951)
- Rendezvous in Grenada (1951)
- Good Enough to Eat (1951)
- Village Feud (1951)
- Full House (1952)
- In the Land of the Sun (1952)
- Carnival (1953)
- After You Duchess (1954)
- The Price of Love (1955)
- The Babes in the Secret Service (1956)
- The Seventh Commandment (1957)
- Send a Woman When the Devil Fails (1957)
- On Foot, on Horse, and on Wheels (1957)
- The Suspects (1957)
- Let's Be Daring, Madame (1957)
- The Bureaucrats (1959)
- Daniella by Night (1961)
- Mission to Venice (1964)

== Bibliography ==
- Klossner, Michael. The Europe of 1500-1815 on Film and Television: A Worldwide Filmography of Over 2550 Works, 1895 Through 2000. McFarland & Company, 2002.
- Raimondo-Souto, H. Mario. Motion Picture Photography: A History, 1891-1960. McFarland, 2006.
