= The Last Judgment (1945 film) =

1945 film

- Directed by: René Chanas
- Written by: René Chanas; Henri Jeanson
- Produced by: Raymond Dervaux; Charles Méré
- Starring: Raymond Bussières; Jean Davy; Jean Desailly
- Cinematography: Nikolai Toporkoff
- Edited by: Claude Nicole
- Music by: Jean Martinon
- Production company: Minerva
- Release date: 8 December 1945
- Running time: 105 minutes
- Country: France
- Language: French

The Last Judgment (French: Le jugement dernier) is a 1945 French drama film by René Chanas starring Raymond Bussières, Jean Davy and Jean Desailly. It is set during the Second World War in a German-occupied country in Central Europe.

It recorded admissions in France of 1,468,085.

== Main cast ==
- Raymond Bussières as Kroum
- Jean Davy as Stefan
- Jean Desailly as Kvril
- Michèle Martin as Milia
- Louis Seigner as Bora
- Jean Brochard as Svoboda
- Paul Oettly as Professeur Yakotcha
- Robert Dalban as le policier civil
- Michel Vitold as Vassili
- Sandra Milovanoff as Madame Svoboda
- René Bourbon as le patron de la taverne
- Georges Baconnet
- Roger Blin
- Jean-Roger Caussimon
- Erno Crisa

== Bibliography ==
- Hayward, Susan. French National Cinema. Routledge, 2004.
