= Crime at the Concert Mayol =

1954 film

- Belgian poster
- Directed by: Pierre Méré
- Written by: Jacques Chabannes; Lucien Rimels
- Produced by: Bernard-Roland; Georges Sénamaud
- Starring: Claude Godard; Jean-Pierre Kérien; Daniel Clérice
- Cinematography: Pierre Dolley
- Edited by: Jacques Mavel
- Music by: Marcel Landowski
- Production companies: Les Films Lutétia; Union Européenne Cinématographie
- Distributed by: Sofradis
- Release date: 19 July 1954
- Running time: 97 minutes
- Countries: France; Italy
- Language: French

Crime at the Concert Mayol (French: Crime au Concert Mayol) is a 1954 French-Italian crime drama film directed by Pierre Méré and starring Claude Godard, Jean-Pierre Kérien and Daniel Clérice. It is set at the Concert Mayol in Paris, a cabaret that became known for its striptease shows after the Second World War. The film intercuts between musical numbers in the venue and the investigations of the detectives offstage.

== Synopsis ==
At a Parisian music hall venue Mado, the star performer, narrowly survives an attempt to murder her. The investigating police are called in again soon afterwards when the body of another woman is discovered shot dead in Mado's dressing room.

== Cast ==
- Claude Godard as Mado
- Jean-Pierre Kérien as Inspecteur Million
- Daniel Clérice as Max
- Robert Berri as Fred
- Jean Tissier as M Grumeau
- Jean Daurand as Bill
- Ariane Lancell as La danseuse
- Paul Demange as Nestor
- Fernand Gilbert as L'imprésario
- Charles Roy as Le commissaire
- Christian Lude as Le médecin
- Gina Manès as La concierge
- Célia Cortez as Lydia
- Paul Ensia as Le directeur
- Simone Berthier as L'infirmière
- Jean Blancheur as Un inspecteur
- Sylvain Levignac as Un truand
- Julien Maffre as Le machiniste
- Franck Maurice as Un inspecteur
- Marcel Portier as L'adjoint de Million
- Georges Sauval as Le voisin

== Bibliography ==
- Powrie, Phil & Cadalanu, Marie . The French Film Musical. Bloomsbury Publishing, 2020.
- Rège, Philippe. Encyclopedia of French Film Directors, Volume 1. Scarecrow Press, 2009.
