= The Island of Love =

1944 film

- Directed by: Maurice Cam
- Written by: Saint-Sorny (novel); Stéphane Pizella; Charles Exbrayat
- Produced by: Jean-Pierre Frogerais
- Starring: Tino Rossi; Édouard Delmont; Josseline Gaël; Jacques Louvigny
- Cinematography: André Thomas
- Edited by: Jeannette Berton
- Music by: Louis Gasté; Roger Lucchesi; Henri Tomasi
- Production company: Cyrnos Film
- Distributed by: Les Films Vog
- Release date: 24 May 1944
- Running time: 85 minutes
- Country: France
- Language: French
- Box office: 3,142,290 admissions (France)

The Island of Love (French: L'île d'amour) is a 1944 French drama film directed by Maurice Cam and starring Tino Rossi, Édouard Delmont and Josseline Gaël.

== Synopsis ==
A Corsican fisherman becomes ensnared by a sophisticated woman and follows her to Paris.

== Cast ==
- Tino Rossi as Orsani dit Bicchi
- Édouard Delmont as Christiani
- Josseline Gaël as Xénia
- Jacques Louvigny as Alilaire
- Charles Blavette as Le contrebandier
- Lilia Vetti as Marie-Jeanne
- Jacques Castelot as L'ami de Xénia
- Fernand Charpin as Le maire
- Michel Vitold as André Bozzi
- Louis Florencie
- Sylvie as La voyante
- Raphaël Patorni as Simon Bozzi
- Raymond Rognoni
- André Carnège as Le juge d'instruction
- Fernand Flament
- Rudy Caumont
- Jean Didier
- Fabia Gringor
- Camille Guérini
- Jean Morel
- Michel Salina

== Reception ==
It was one of the most popular movies in France in 1945 with admissions of 3,142,290.

== Bibliography ==
- Rège, Philippe. Encyclopedia of French Film Directors, Volume 1. Scarecrow Press, 2009.
