= Dominique (1950 film) =

- Directed by: Yvan Noé
- Written by: Yvan Noé (play and screenplay)
- Produced by: Yvan Noé
- Starring: Michel Barbey; Pierrette Caillol; Roger Monteaux
- Cinematography: Fred Langenfeld
- Edited by: Robert Isnardon
- Music by: Wal Berg
- Production company: Paris-Nice Productions
- Distributed by: Cinéfi
- Release date: 21 April 1950
- Running time: 88 minutes
- Country: France
- Language: French

Dominique is a 1950 French comedy film directed by Yvan Noé and starring Michel Barbey, Pierrette Caillol and Roger Monteaux. It was adapted by Noé from one of his own plays.

== Cast ==
- Michel Barbey as Dominique Fougerolles
- Claire Muriel as Simone Lambert
- Roger Monteaux as Eugène Fougerolles
- Pierrette Caillol as Germaine Fougerolles
- Jean Témerson
- Robert Moor as Oncle Charles
- Henry Houry as Docteur Pinel
- Marguerite Ducouret as Madame Rabaud
- Lucien Callamand
- Gustave Hamilton as Grandfather
- Emma Lyonel as Tante Jeanne
- Yvette Maurech as Maria
- Sophie Mallet
- George Khoury

== Bibliography ==
- Goble, Alan. The Complete Index to Literary Sources in Film. Walter de Gruyter, 1999.
