= Destiny (1946 film) =

1946 film

- Directed by: Richard Pottier
- Written by: Jean-Pierre Feydeau
- Produced by: Édouard Harispuru
- Starring: Tino Rossi; Micheline Francey; Mila Parély
- Cinematography: André Germain
- Edited by: Jean Pouzet
- Music by: Raymond Legrand
- Production company: Compagnie Commerciale Française Cinématographique
- Distributed by: Compagnie Commerciale Française Cinématographique
- Release date: 18 December 1946
- Running time: 88 minutes
- Country: France
- Language: French

Destiny (French: Destins) is a 1946 French musical comedy drama film directed by Richard Pottier and starring Tino Rossi, Micheline Francey and Mila Parély. The film's sets were designed by the art director Robert Hubert.

== Synopsis ==
André Cartier is a successful singer and is married with a young son. His twin Fred has not been so fortunate in life, and his resentment is encouraged by his wife Clara. Just released from prison, she convinces him to kidnap his nephew and hold him for a ransom.

== Cast ==
- Tino Rossi as André Cartier / Fred Cartier
- Micheline Francey as Jacqueline Cartier
- Mila Parély as Clara Cartier
- Marcelle Géniat as Mme Moretti
- Armand Bernard as Lobligeois
- Paul Demange as Le détective
- Saint-Granier as Saint-Granier
- Gabrielle Fontan as La faiseuse de réussites
- Paul Azaïs
- Philippe Hersent
- Paul Ollivier

== Bibliography ==
- Bessy, Maurice & Chirat, Raymond. Histoire du cinéma français: encyclopédie des films, 1940–1950. Pygmalion, 1986
- Rège, Philippe. Encyclopedia of French Film Directors, Volume 1. Scarecrow Press, 2009.
