= Danger of Death =

1947 film

- Directed by: Gilles Grangier
- Written by: Charles Exbrayat; René Wheeler
- Produced by: Paul Devriès; Ferdinand Liffran; Adrien Remaugé
- Starring: Fernand Ledoux; Georges Lannes; Micheline Francey
- Cinematography: Raymond Clunie
- Edited by: Andrée Danis
- Music by: Raymond Gallois-Montbrun
- Production companies: Les Prisonniers Associés; Pathé
- Distributed by: Pathé
- Release date: 17 December 1947
- Running time: 90 minutes
- Country: France
- Language: French

Danger of Death (French: Danger de mort) is a 1947 French thriller film directed by Gilles Grangier and starring Fernand Ledoux, Georges Lannes and Micheline Francey. It was shot at the Joinville Studios in Paris and on location around Sens. The film's sets were designed by the art director Roger Simon.

== Synopsis ==
Distracted the night after his wife give births, a pharmacist in provincial France accidentally puts a dose of cyanide in a batch of medicine he is making up. Realising what he has done he goes out to prevent the five customers from taking the lethal concoction.

== Cast ==
- Fernand Ledoux as Le pharmacien Adrien Loiseau
- Georges Lannes as Ceccaldi
- Micheline Francey as Flora
- Colette Richard as La jeune mariée
- Christine Hayrel as L'écuyère
- Mona Dol as Une commère
- Maurice Schutz as Le beau-père de Loiseau
- Jacky Pasquero as Ceccaldi fils
- Jean-Marc Lambert as Le jeune marié
- René Blancard as Philippe Chauvieux
- Charles Lavialle as Le receveur
- François Joux as Alfred Bouchard
- Jacques Emmanuel as Le mari de Flora
- Michel Rob as Jean-Baptiste Chauvieux
- Yvonne Yma as La marchande de journaux

== Bibliography ==
- Kermabon, Jacques. Pathé: premier empire du cinéma. Centre Georges Pompidou, 1994.
- Rège, Philippe. Encyclopedia of French Film Directors, Volume 1. Scarecrow Press, 2009.
