= Six Little Girls in White =

1942 film

- Directed by: Yvan Noé
- Written by: Yvan Noé
- Produced by: Yvan Noé
- Starring: Jean Murat; Janine Darcey; Henri Guisol
- Cinematography: Fred Langenfeld
- Edited by: Pierre Meurisse
- Music by: Roger Lucchesi
- Production company: France Productions
- Distributed by: Védis
- Release date: 21 November 1942
- Running time: 95 minutes
- Country: France
- Language: French

Six Little Girls in White (French: Six petites filles en blanc) is a 1942 French comedy film directed by Yvan Noé and starring Jean Murat, Janine Darcey and Henri Guisol. The film's sets were designed by the art director Jean Douarinou.

== Cast ==
- Jean Murat as Serge Charan
- Janine Darcey as Simone
- Henri Guisol as Arsène
- Pierrette Caillol as Charlotte Charan
- Lysiane Rey as Denise
- Gisèle Alcée as Paulette
- Pierrette Vial as Nelly
- Georges Alain as Alain
- René Noel as Le laitier
- Monette Michel as Claudette
- France Degand as Jacqueline
- Gaston Gabaroche as Le jardinier
- Mady Berry as Pauline
- Ann Kryser as La danseuse
- Wall Kryser as Le danseur
- Reda Caire as Le chanteur

== Bibliography ==
- Rège, Philippe. Encyclopedia of French Film Directors, Volume 1. Scarecrow Press, 2009.
