= The Law of Spring =

1942 film

- Directed by: Jacques Daniel-Norman
- Written by: Jacques Daniel-Norman; Alfred Machard
- Based on: The Law of Spring by Lucien Nepoty
- Produced by: Camille Trachimel
- Starring: Huguette Duflos; Pierre Renoir; Alice Field
- Cinematography: Christian Matras
- Edited by: Mireille Bessette
- Music by: Vincent Scotto
- Production company: Les Films Camille Trachimel
- Distributed by: Consortium du Film
- Release date: 20 May 1942
- Running time: 100 minutes
- Country: France
- Language: French

The Law of Spring (French: La loi du printemps) is a 1942 French comedy film directed by Jacques Daniel-Norman and starring Huguette Duflos, Pierre Renoir and Alice Field. It is based on the 1912 play of the same title by Lucien Nepoty. The film's sets were designed by the art director Roland Quignon.

== Synopsis ==
When widower Frédéric Villaret marries the widowed Jeanne, their respective children come to live in the same house. They discover that they dislike their half-siblings, and a series of family quarrels ensue.

== Cast ==
- Huguette Duflos as Jeanne Villaret
- Pierre Renoir as Frédéric Villaret
- Alice Field as Hélène Harlay
- Maï Bill as Fanine Villaret
- Marguerite Deval as Tante Léonie
- Yves Furet as Georges Burdan
- René Génin as Firmin
- Philippe Richard as Louis
- Monique Dubois as Jeannette
- Jean-Jacques as Le petit garçon d'Hélène
- Colette Laurent as Antoinette
- Marguerite Ducouret as Mélanie
- Gilbert Gil as Hubert Villaret
- Georges Rollin as Richard Burdan
- Julien Maffre as Canard
- Violette France as Mlle Richepaille
- Louis Blanche as Le président
- Suzanne Yorelle as Mme Gatinais
- Paulette Paule as Mme Courtin-Lamothe
- Jacques Derives as Un invité
- Louis Seigner as Le docteur
- Madame Rolande as Baronne de Marcheville
- Hélène Briand as Mme Morillon
- Michèle Calvi as Lucienne Desfargeot
- Hélène Petit as Mme Desfargeot
- Loulou Reyne as Mme Beauvision
- Denise Noël as Amélie

== Bibliography ==
- Bessy, Maurice & Chirat, Raymond. Histoire du cinéma français: encyclopédie des films, 1940–1950. Pygmalion, 1986
- Goble, Alan. The Complete Index to Literary Sources in Film. Walter de Gruyter, 1999.
- Rège, Philippe. Encyclopedia of French Film Directors, Volume 1. Scarecrow Press, 2009.
