= The Eleven O'Clock Woman =

1948 film

- Directed by: Jean Devaivre
- Written by: Jean-Paul Le Chanois
- Based on: The Eleven O'Clock Woman by Pierre Apestéguy
- Produced by: Jean Devaivre; Robert Sussfeld
- Starring: Paul Meurisse; Micheline Francey; Pierre Renoir
- Cinematography: René Gaveau
- Edited by: Louis Devaivre
- Music by: Joseph Kosma
- Production company: Les Films Neptune
- Distributed by: Sirius Films
- Release date: 3 March 1948
- Running time: 97 minutes
- Country: France
- Language: French

The Eleven O'Clock Woman (French: La dame d'onze heures) is a 1948 French mystery thriller film directed by Jean Devaivre and starring Paul Meurisse, Micheline Francey, Gilbert Gil and Pierre Renoir. It is based on the 1938 novel of the same title by Pierre Apestéguy. It was shot at the François 1er Studios in Paris and on location around the city. The film's sets were designed by the art director Robert Hubert.

== Synopsis ==
Stanislas, a young explorer recently back from Africa, goes to visit the Pescara family. When a murder takes place he sets out as an amateur detective to solve the crime.

== Cast ==
- Paul Meurisse as Stanislas-Octave Seminario dit 'SOS'
- Micheline Francey as Muriel Pescara
- Gilbert Gil as Charles Pescara
- Pierre Renoir as Le docteur Gérard Pescara
- Jean Tissier as Guillaume
- Jean Brochard as Le juge d'instruction
- Pierre-Louis as Paul Wantz dit Delbecq
- Junie Astor as Hélène Tassin - l'infirmière
- Jean Debucourt as Le docteur Vermeulen
- Mady Berry as Brigitte Tassin
- Pierre Palau as Le portier
- Arthur Devère as L'éclusier
- Marcel Pérès as Le cantonnier
- Jean Sinoël as Le jardinier
- Georges Bever as Baptiste - le greffier
- Madeleine Suffel as La patronne de l'hôtel
- Michel Seldow as Le prestidigitateur Pablo

== Bibliography ==
- Bessy, Maurice & Chirat, Raymond. Histoire du cinéma français: encyclopédie des films, 1940–1950. Pygmalion, 1986
- Goble, Alan. The Complete Index to Literary Sources in Film. Walter de Gruyter, 1999.
- Rège, Philippe. Encyclopedia of French Film Directors, Volume 1. Scarecrow Press, 2009.
