= Micheline Francey =

French actress (1919–1969)

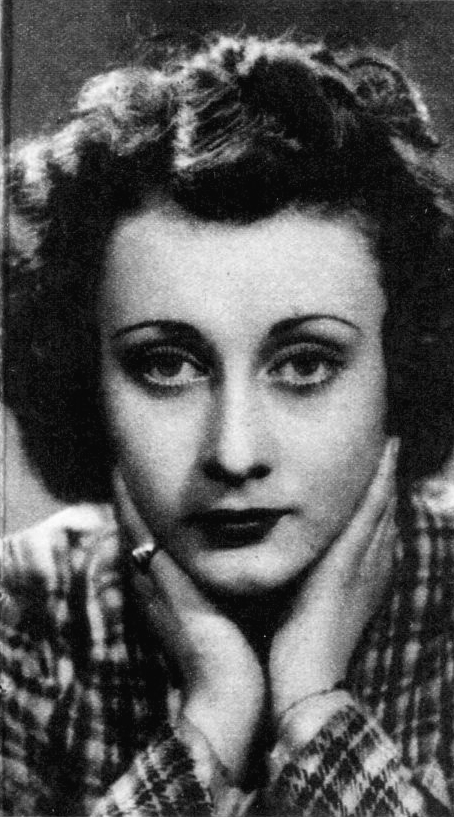
- Micheline Francey in 1938.
- Born: Micheline Henriette Françoise Gay-Bellile; 19 October 1919; Paris, France
- Died: 1 January 1969 (aged 49); Paris, France
- Occupation: Actress
- Years active: 1937–1968 (film)

Micheline Francey (19 October 1919 – 1 January 1969) was a French film actress.

== Selected filmography ==
- The Chess Player (1938)
- The President (1938)
- The Phantom Carriage (1939)
- Monsieur La Souris (1942)
- Le Corbeau (1943)
- Madly in Love (1943)
- A Cage of Nightingales (1945)
- François Villon (1945)
- Destiny (1946)
- The Adventure of Cabassou (1946)
- The Village of Wrath (1947)
- Danger of Death (1947)
- Vertigo (1947)
- The Eleven O'Clock Woman (1948)
- The Woman I Murdered (1948)
- Marlene (1949)
- Sending of Flowers (1950)
- Quay of Grenelle (1950)
- Holiday for Henrietta (1952)
- Imperial Violets (1952)
- Little Jacques (1953)
- Rasputin (1954)
- The Dance (1962)

== Bibliography ==
- Hayward, Susan. Les Diaboliques. University of Illinois Press, 2005.
