= Marinella (film) =

1936 film

- Directed by: Pierre Caron
- Written by: René Pujol
- Produced by: Jack Forrester; André Parant
- Starring: Tino Rossi; Yvette Lebon; Jeanne Fusier-Gir
- Cinematography: Willy Faktorovitch; Louis Page
- Edited by: Christian Chamborant; André Versein
- Music by: Vincent Scotto
- Production company: Forrester-Parant Productions
- Distributed by: Forrester-Parant
- Release date: 12 March 1936
- Running time: 88 minutes
- Country: France
- Language: French

Marinella is a 1936 French comedy film directed by Pierre Caron and starring Tino Rossi, Yvette Lebon and Jeanne Fusier-Gir.

The film's sets were designed by the art director Jean Douarinou.

== Cast ==
- Tino Rossi as Tino Pirelli
- Yvette Lebon as Lise
- Jeanne Fusier-Gir as Madame Irma
- Albert Duvaleix as Barton
- Pierre Juvenet as Vautrat
- Georges Flateau as Bob Grey
- Spadolini as Le danseur
- Marcya Capri as La speakerine
- Julien Carette as Trombert
- Ginette Darcy
- Cinda Glenn as Sylvia Grey
- Raymond Cordy
- Paul Demange
- Philippe Derevel
- Madeleine Gérôme
- Jany Laferrière
- Georges Marceau
- Edouard Rousseau
- Marthe Sarbel

== Bibliography ==
- Philippe Rège. Encyclopedia of French Film Directors, Volume 1. Scarecrow Press, 2009.
