= Strange Inheritance (film) =

1943 film

- Directed by: Louis Daquin
- Written by: Marcel Aymé
- Based on: Strange Inheritance by Georges Simenon
- Produced by: Robert Chabert; Marcel Roux
- Starring: Assia Noris; Jules Berry; Gabrielle Dorziat
- Cinematography: André Thomas
- Edited by: Suzanne de Troeye
- Music by: Roger Désormière; Jean Wiener
- Production companies: Francinex; Consorzio EIA
- Distributed by: Films Emka; CEIAD
- Release date: 8 April 1943
- Running time: 102 minutes
- Countries: France; Italy
- Language: French

Strange Inheritance or The Traveller on All Saints' Day (French: Le voyageur de la Toussaint, Italian: Il viaggiatore d'Ognissanti) is a 1943 French-Italian mystery film directed by Louis Daquin and starring Assia Noris, Jules Berry, Gabrielle Dorziat and Guillaume de Sax. It is an adaptation of the 1941 novel of the same title by Georges Simenon.

The film's sets were designed by the art director René Moulaert. It was made as a co-production between Occupied France and Fascist Italy.

== Synopsis ==
On a misty November day a young man makes a returns to his hometown of La Rochelle following the death of his Uncle, who has left him his entire fortune. He finds his upper-class family resent him because his parents were both music hall entertainers. He begins to investigate the circumstances of his uncle's suspicious death.

== Cast ==
- Assia Noris as Colette Mauvoisin
- Jules Berry as Plantel
- Gabrielle Dorziat as Gérardine Éloi
- Guillaume de Sax as Babin
- Jean Desailly as Gilles Mauvoisin
- Simone Valère as Alice Lepart
- Serge Reggiani as Bob Éloi
- Hubert Prélier as Le docteur Sauvaget
- Jacques Castelot as Jean Plantel
- Jean Didier as Le marin
- Martial Rèbe as Lepart
- Eugène Yvernès as Le capitaine du navire
- Mona Dol as Jaja
- Marguerite Ducouret as Madame Rinquet
- Marie-Hélène Dasté as Madame Sauvaget
- Christiane Ribes as Armandine
- Ginette Curtey as Raymonde
- Alexandre Rignault as L'inspecteur Rinquet
- Louis Seigner as Maître Hervineau
- Roger Karl as Pénoux-Rataud
- Guy Decomble as Robert
- René Blancard as Le directeur du théâtre
- Jean Daurand as Un marin
- Clary Monthal as Madame Lepart
- Albert Rémy as L'ivrogne
- Marcel Duhamel as Le juge d'instruction
- Gabrielle Fontan as La vieille aubergiste
- Léon Larive as Le patron du restaurant
- Marguerite de Morlaye as Une invitée du banquet
- Simone Signoret as Extra

== Bibliography ==
- Carter, David. The Pocket Essential Georges Simenon. Pocket Essentials, 2003.
- Chiti, Roberto & Poppi, Roberto. I film: Tutti i film italiani dal 1930 al 1944. Gremese Editore, 2005.
- Moliterno, Gino. Historical Dictionary of Italian Cinema. Scarecrow Press, 2008.
