= Those of the Sky =

1941 film

- Directed by: Yvan Noé
- Written by: Yvan Noé
- Based on: L'As by Blanche Alix
- Starring: Marie Bell; Pierre Renoir; Jean Galland
- Cinematography: Nikolai Toporkoff
- Edited by: Jean-Paul Le Chanois
- Music by: C.P. Simon
- Production company: Fana Films
- Distributed by: Gallia Cine
- Release date: 5 March 1941
- Running time: 86 minutes
- Country: France
- Language: French

Those of the Sky (French: Ceux du ciel) is a 1941 French drama film directed by Yvan Noé and starring Marie Bell, Pierre Renoir and Jean Galland. The film's sets were designed by the art director Jean Douarinou.

== Synopsis ==
The film depicts a love triangle set against the backdrop of aviation. An aircraft manufacturer presses his son-in-law to fly a new prototype leading to him being injured and forced to pull out of a competition in which a younger rival makes the running.

== Cast ==
- Marie Bell as Hélène
- Pierre Renoir as Pierron
- Jean Galland as Bourrier
- Jean Servais as Monval
- Ginette Curtey as Simone
- Lydie Vallois as Annette
- Georges Paulais as Le docteur
- Pierrette Caillol as La romancière
- Raymond Aimos as Potel
- Robert Favart as Un pilote
- Suzy Solidor as la chanteuse

== Bibliography ==
- Rège, Philippe. Encyclopedia of French Film Directors, Volume 1. Scarecrow Press, 2009.
- Siclier, Jacques. La France de Pétain et son cinéma. H. Veyrier, 1981.
