= Napoleon Road =

1953 film

- Belgian poster
- Directed by: Jean Delannoy
- Written by: Antoine Blondin; Jean Delannoy; Roland Laudenbach
- Produced by: Joseph Bercholz; Edouard Gide
- Starring: Pierre Fresnay; Henri Vilbert; Claude Laydu
- Cinematography: Léonce-Henri Burel
- Edited by: James Cuenet
- Music by: Paul Misraki
- Production company: Les Films Gibé
- Distributed by: Pathé Consortium Cinéma
- Release date: 14 October 1953
- Running time: 90 minutes
- Country: France
- Language: French

Napoleon Road (French: La route Napoléon) is a 1953 French comedy film directed by Jean Delannoy and starring Pierre Fresnay, Henri Vilbert and Claude Laydu. It was partly shot at the Billancourt Studios in Paris. The film's sets were designed by the art director Serge Piménoff.

== Synopsis ==
A chancer organises a series of package tours along a route said to have been taken by Napoleon in 1815 when in fact the Emperor never set foot there. The local inhabitants back up his story as they hope to cash in on the tourist boom.

== Cast ==
- Pierre Fresnay as Édouard Martel
- Henri Vilbert as Blaise
- Claude Laydu as Pierre Marchand
- René Génin as Le curé
- Mireille Ozy as Stella
- Raphaël Patorni as Bonvent
- Fernand Sardou as Le maire de Bourg-sur-Bléone
- Henri Arius as Le boucher
- Fransined as Le pharmacien
- Nicolas Amato as Figuières
- Maurice Bénard as Le ministre
- Pierrette Caillol as La femme dudocteur
- Lucien Callamand as Sabatier- le garde-champêtre
- Serge Davin as Cabanis - le coiffeur
- Germaine de France as Madame Martel
- Jean Landier as Emery
- Julien Maffre as Un habitant
- Denise Precheur as Une employée
- Annie Roudier as Delphine
- Hélène Tossy as La postière
- Edmond Verva as Le père du jeune Victor
- Claude Laydu as Pierre Marchand
- Jean Panisse as Raphaël
- Marie Albe as Clarisse - la journaliste
