= The Passerby (1951 film) =

1951 film

- Directed by: Henri Calef
- Written by: Henri Calef; Serge Groussard
- Produced by: Les Films Marceau
- Starring: Henri Vidal Maria Mauban Daniel Ivernel
- Cinematography: Jacques Lemare
- Edited by: Denise Baby
- Music by: Marcel Landowski
- Distributed by: Les Films Marceau
- Release date: 18 May 1951
- Running time: 102 minutes
- Country: France
- Language: French

The Passerby (French: La Passante) is a 1951 French drama film written and directed by Henri Calef and starring Henri Vidal, Maria Mauban and Daniel Ivernel. The scenario is based on Serge Groussard's novel La Femme sans passé.

== Cast ==
- Henri Vidal as François Malard, captain of the houseboat
- Maria Mauban as Madeleine Lemoine - "Mado"
- Daniel Ivernel as Jeanjean, the seaman on the houseboat
- Jane Marken as Mrs Pomont
- Noël Roquevert as Mr Pomont
- Dora Doll as Irma
- Marcelle Géniat as Mrs Iturbe
- Jean Marchat as Maître Darbel
- Annette Poivre as Jeannette
- Robert Dalban as the trafficker
- Pierre Sergeol as the policeman
- Louis de Funès as the lockmaster
- Colette Georges as Miss Pomont
- Solange Certain as Paulette

== Bibliography ==
- Vincendeau, Ginette . Stars and Stardom in French Cinema. Bloomsbury Publishing, 2000.
