= Vertigo (1947 film) =

1947 film

- Directed by: Richard Pottier
- Written by: Paul Fékété; Jacques Natanson
- Produced by: Mario Bruitte; Albert Dodrumez
- Starring: Raymond Rouleau; Micheline Francey; Jean Debucourt
- Cinematography: André Germain; Louis Née
- Edited by: Martine Velle
- Music by: Raymond Legrand
- Production company: Union des Distributeurs Indépendants
- Distributed by: Compagnie Commerciale Française Cinématographique
- Release date: 22 October 1947
- Running time: 106 minutes
- Country: France
- Language: French

Vertigo (French: Vertiges) is a 1947 French drama film directed by Richard Pottier and starring Raymond Rouleau, Micheline Francey and Jean Debucourt. The film's sets were designed by the art director Robert Hubert.

== Cast ==
- Raymond Rouleau as Dr. Jean Favier
- Micheline Francey as Françoise Favier
- Jean Debucourt as Le professeur Borand
- Jimmy Gaillard as Dr. Claude Borand
- Jean Davy as Dr. Michel Berthier
- Noëlle Norman as Odette
- Jacqueline Pierreux as Suzy
- Janine Wansar as Jacqueline, l'amie de Claude
- Thierry Francey as Le petit André
- Jacques Berlioz as Mancelles
- Yves Brainville as Un assistant
- André Brunot as Loiseau
- Gabrielle Fontan as La malade
- Marthe Mellot as La déléguée
- Raphaël Patorni as Un assistant
- Jean Toulout as Le radiologue
- Jeanne Véniat as Malvina

== Bibliography ==
- Bessy, Maurice & Chirat, Raymond. Histoire du cinéma français: encyclopédie des films, 1940–1950. Pygmalion, 1986
- Oscherwitz, Dayna & Higgins, MaryEllen . The A to Z of French Cinema. Scarecrow Press, 2009.
- Rège, Philippe. Encyclopedia of French Film Directors, Volume 1. Scarecrow Press, 2009.
