= Barry (1949 film) =

1949 film by Richard Pottier and Karl Anton

- Directed by: Richard Pottier; Karl Anton
- Written by: Karl Anton; Benno Vigny
- Produced by: Sacha Gordine
- Starring: Pierre Fresnay; Simone Valère; Marc Valbel; Pauline Carton
- Cinematography: Charles Suin
- Edited by: Madeleine Gug
- Music by: Dolf Zinnstag
- Production company: Films Sacha Gordine
- Distributed by: Jeannic Films
- Release date: 2 September 1949
- Running time: 120 minutes
- Country: France
- Language: French

Barry is a 1949 French historical drama film directed by Richard Pottier and Karl Anton and starring Pierre Fresnay, Simone Valère and Pauline Carton. The film's sets were designed by the art director Roland Quignon. It is set in the Napoleonic era.

== Cast ==
- Pierre Fresnay as Le père Théotime
- Simone Valère as Angelina Cavazza
- Marc Valbel as Jean-Marie Sondaz
- Pauline Carton as La mère Culoz
- Yves Deniaud as Le sergent Brocard, dit 'La fleur'
- Gérard Landry as Sylvain Bavoizet
- Jean Brochard as Philémon Cavazza
- François Joux as Le premier prieur
- Raphaël Patorni as Une recrue
- Julien Maffre as Un soldat fatigué
- Alexandre Mihalesco as L'aubergiste
- Jacques Dynam as Le moine Claudius
- Roland Catalano as Buffi, le guide
- Auffret
- Barry as Le chien Barry
- Jean Boissemond
- José Casa
- M. Caudron
- Evelyne Salmon as Gisèle Sondaz
- Fernand Blot as Un paysan
- Roger Bontemps as Le second prieur
- Robert Le Fort as Le Frisé
- Liliane Lesaffre as Catherine, la servante
- Albert Michel as Un moine
- Eliane Salmon as Gisèle Sondaz

== Bibliography ==
- Dayna Oscherwitz & MaryEllen Higgins. The A to Z of French Cinema. Scarecrow Press, 2009.
