= Daniel Clérice =

French actor (1912–1990)

- Born: 23 October 1912; Paris, France
- Died: 10 March 1990 (aged 77); Bordeaux, Gironde, France
- Occupation: Actor
- Years active: 1936–1957 (film)

Daniel Clérice (1912–1990) was a French film and stage actor.

== Selected filmography ==
- Culprit (1937)
- Vidocq (1939)
- Bécassine (1940)
- Miquette (1940)
- Le roi des resquilleurs (1945)
- Without Trumpet or Drum (1950)
- Come Down, Someone Wants You (1951)
- Father Brown (1954)
- Crime at the Concert Mayol (1954)
- Boulevard du crime (1955)
- Hospital de urgencia (1956)

== Bibliography ==
- Bessy, Maurice. Histoire du cinéma français: 1956-1960. Pygmalion, 1986.
