= Denise Baby =

French film editor

- Occupation: Film editor
- Years active: 1947–1971

Denise Baby was a French film editor known for her work on titles like Le colonel Durand and The Passerby. She also worked as an assistant director on 1954's The Secret of Helene Marimon.

== Selected filmography ==
As editor:

- Atout sexe (1971)
- The Wall (1967)
- Destination Rome (1963)
- In the French Style (1963) (sound effects)
- The Trial (1962)
- The Heirs (1960)
- The Motorcycle Cops (1959)
- My Darned Father (1958)
- Vive les vacances (1958)
- Les violents (1957)
- Fatal Affair (1953)
- The Passerby (1951)
- Le colonel Durand (1948)
- Six Hours to Lose (1947)

As assistant director:

- The Secret of Helene Marimon (1954)
