= White Squadron =

White Squadron or white squadron may be:

- White Squadron (Royal Navy), a former unit of the Royal Navy, flying the White Ensign
- White Squadron (US Navy), an alternative term for the "Squadron of Evolution", a transitional unit in the US Navy
- White Squadron (Romania), a former air ambulance unit of Royal Romanian Air Force
- Lo squadrone bianco (The White Squadron), a 1936 Italian film based on the novel
- The White Squadron (1949 film) (L'escadron blanc), a French adventure film based on the novel
- L'Escadron blanc (The White Squadron), a 1931 novel by Joseph Peyré
