= Solita de Cordoue =

1946 film

- Directed by: Willy Rozier
- Written by: Jean Proal
- Produced by: Willy Rozier
- Starring: Carmen Torres; Alain Cuny; Blanchette Brunoy; Édouard Delmont
- Cinematography: Raymond Agnel
- Edited by: Linette Nicolas
- Music by: Jean Yatove; José Sentis
- Production company: Sport-Films
- Distributed by: Les Films de Koster
- Release date: 24 April 1946
- Running time: 75 minutes
- Country: France
- Language: French

Solita de Cordoue is a 1946 French drama film directed by Willy Rozier and starring Carmen Torres, Alain Cuny and Blanchette Brunoy. The film's sets were designed by the art director Aimé Bazin.

== Synopsis ==
Pierre Desluc is married to Marie and lives a quiet life in the Landes but dreams of leaving the area. When he encounters a passing band of gypsies he falls in love with Solita and plans to abandon his home to journey with her.

== Cast ==
- Carmen Torres as Solita
- Alain Cuny as Pierre Desluc
- Blanchette Brunoy as Marie
- Édouard Delmont as
  Le père Dupeyroux
- Roland Bailly
- Roger Bontemps
- Robert Hommet

== Bibliography ==
- Rège, Philippe. Encyclopedia of French Film Directors, Volume 1. Scarecrow Press, 2009.
