= Her Last Christmas =

1952 film

- Directed by: Jacques Daniel-Norman
- Written by: Jacques Daniel-Norman; Guy Diamant
- Produced by: Jean Lefait
- Starring: Tino Rossi; Claude May; Louis Seigner
- Cinematography: Lucien Joulin
- Edited by: Germaine Artus
- Music by: Raymond Legrand
- Production company: Paris-Monde-Production
- Distributed by: Mondial Films
- Release date: 12 December 1952
- Running time: 93 minutes
- Country: France
- Language: French

Her Last Christmas (French: Son dernier Noël) is a 1952 French musical drama film directed by Jacques Daniel-Norman and starring Tino Rossi, Claude May and Louis Seigner. The film's sets were designed by the art director Robert Hubert.

== Synopsis ==
In order to comfort a dying child, her family and others stage a last Christmas for her even though it is not the right time of year.

== Cast ==
- Tino Rossi as Marc Damiani
- Claude May as Lucie Vilardi
- Louis Seigner as Le professeur Valensio
- Ketty Kerviel as La Mado
- Charlotte Clasis as Grand-mère Fabrèze
- Suzanne Pill as Madame Valensio
- Christine Elsen as Françoise
- Catherine Mallet as L'infirmière
- Charlotte Ecard as L'infirmière chef
- Laura Daryl as L'épicière
- Paul Demange as Le professeur de sciences
- André Bervil as Le droguiste
- Julien Maffre as Gus
- Jacques Angelvin as Le directeur de la radio
- Geno Ferny as Le curé
- Gaston Rey as Antoine Fabrèze
- Georges Tabet as L'électricien
- Les Petits Chanteurs de Saint Laurent as Themselves
- Yannick Malloire as Angèle
- Louis Lanzi as Fil Souple
- Alain Malloire as Yaourt
- Michel Malloire as Farine
- Marie-France as Zita
- Georges Poujouly as Raphaël Fabrèze
- Édouard Delmont as Le père Gallès

== Bibliography ==
- Bessy, Maurice & Chirat, Raymond. Histoire du cinéma français: 1951-1955. Pygmalion, 1989.
- Rège, Philippe. Encyclopedia of French Film Directors, Volume 1. Scarecrow Press, 2009.
