= Rino Mondellini =

Italian art director

- Born: 2 September 1908; Milan, Italy
- Died: February 1974 (aged 65); France
- Occupation: Art director
- Years active: 1949-1971 (film)

Rino Mondellini (1908-1974) was an Italian art director known for his work in the French film industry.

== Selected filmography ==
- Come Down, Someone Wants You (1951)
- The Night Is My Kingdom (1951)
- Shadow and Light (1951)
- Forbidden Fruit (1952)
- Children of Love (1953)
- Mademoiselle from Paris (1955)
- Trapeze (1956)
- The Lebanese Mission (1956)
- The Adventures of Arsène Lupin (1957)
- Lift to the Scaffold (1958)
- Tabarin (1958)
- Serenade of Texas (1958)
- Ravishing (1960)
- Le Tracassin (1961)
- Fanny (1961)
- The Champagne Murders (1967)
- Two Weeks in September (1967)
- The Young Wolves (1968)

== Bibliography ==
- Hayward, Susan. Simone Signoret: The Star as Cultural Sign. Continuum, 2004.
