= Louis Seigner =

French actor (1903–1991)

- Born: 23 June 1903; Saint-Chef, Isère, France
- Died: 20 January 1991 (aged 87); Paris, France
- Resting place: Ivry Cemetery, Ivry-sur-Seine
- Occupation: Actor
- Years active: 1933–1982
- Children: Françoise Seigner
- Relatives: Emmanuelle Seigner (granddaughter); Mathilde Seigner (granddaughter)

Louis Seigner (23 June 1903 – 20 January 1991) was a French actor.

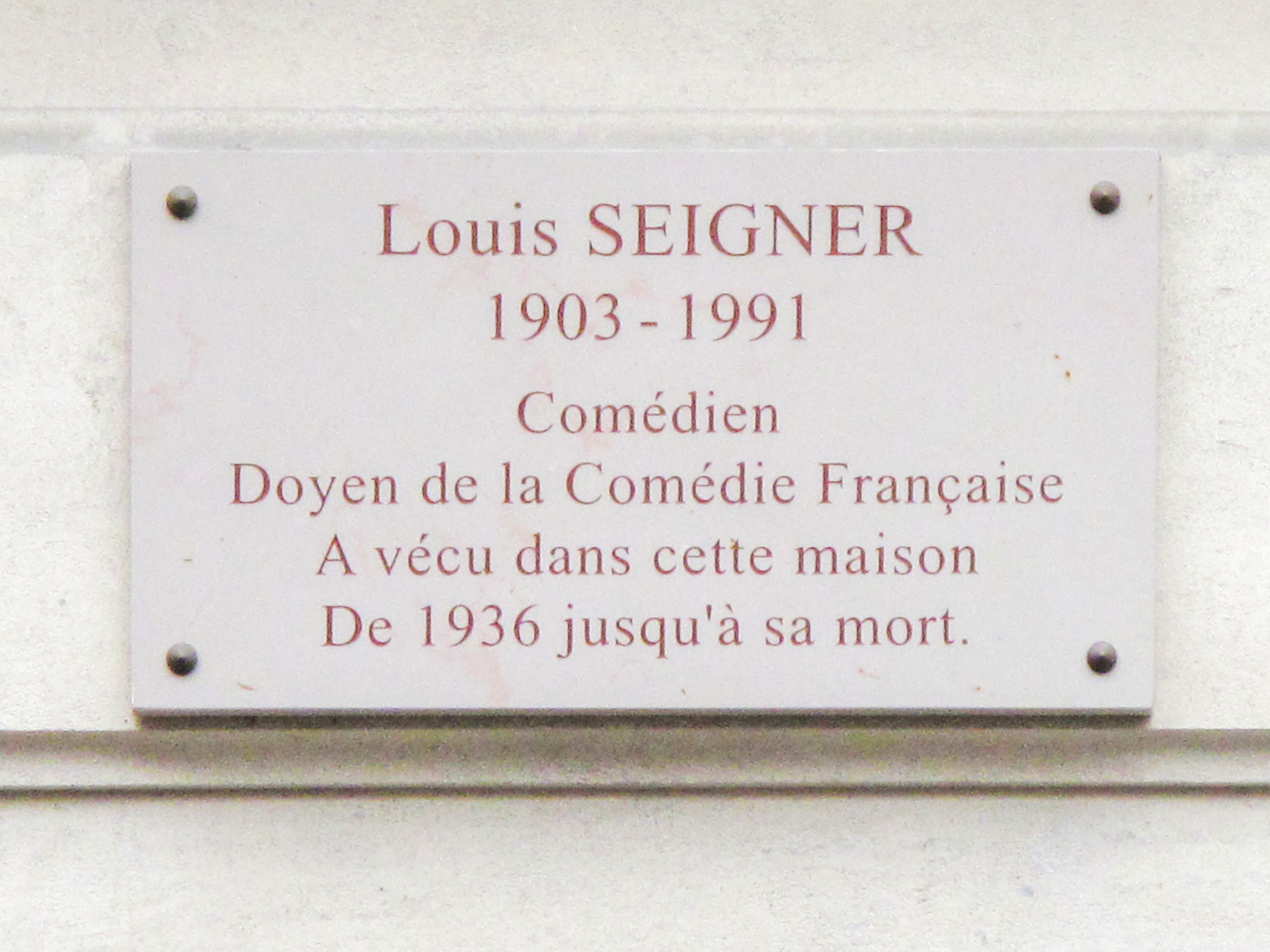
Plaque where died Louis Seigner in the fire of the building: 12 rue Pierre-et-Marie-Curie, Paris 5th arrond.

He was born in Saint-Chef, Isère, France, the son of Louise (Monin) and Joseph Seigner, and died in Paris. He was the father of actress Françoise Seigner, with Marie Cazeaux, and the grandfather of Emmanuelle Seigner, Mathilde Seigner and Marie-Amélie Seigner.

== Filmography ==
Film
Year	Title	Role	Notes
1931	Une histoire entre mille		
1933	Chotard and Company	Le capitaine de gendarmerie Edmond Ducasse	
1934	Les deux mousquetaires de Nini		
1938	Alert in the Mediterranean	Le juge d'instruction	
1939	Entente cordiale	Eckardstein - l'ambassadeur d'Allemagne	
1941	Portrait of Innocence	Le directeur de l'école	
1941	The Chain Breaker	Le ministre	
1942	La Symphonie fantastique	Habeneck	Uncredited
1942	The Law of Spring	Le docteur	
1942	Chiffon's Wedding	Philippe de Bray	
1942	No Love Allowed	Le directeur de l'hôtel	Uncredited
1943	Strange Inheritance	Maître Hervineau	
1943	It Happened at the Inn	L'instituteur	
1943	Des jeunes filles dans la nuit		Uncredited
1943	Angels of the Streets	Le directeur de la prison	
1943	Les Roquevillard	Le procureur de la République	Uncredited
1943	The Secret of Madame Clapain	Ancelin	
1943	Le Corbeau	Le docteur Bertrand	
1943	Vautrin	Le baron Frédéric de Nucingen	
1943	Lucrèce	Maître Broizin - le tuteur de François	
1944	First on the Rope	Le docteur	
1944	Night Shift	Le docteur Renaud	
1945	The Last Judgment	Bora	
1946	Jericho	Le docteur Noblet	
1946	The Eternal Husband	La juge Ernest Zakhlebinine	
1946	A Lover's Return	Edmond Gonin	
1946	Patrie	Patrie	
1947	Dreams of Love	Le comte d'Agoult	
1947	The Royalists	L'abbé Gudin	
1947	La femme en rouge	Malvet	
1947	The Bouquinquant Brothers	Le juge d'instruction	
1948	The Charterhouse of Parma	Grillo - le gardien de la Tour Farnese	
1948	La carcasse et le tord-cou	Casimir Gros	
1948	Colonel Durand	Le commandant Millet	
1948	Man to Men	Philibert Routorbe	
1949	A Change in the Wind	Monsieur Bourride	
1949	Rendezvous in July	Levase - le professeur d'art dramatique	
1949	Maya	Le paysan	
1949	Singoalla	Le prieur / Priest	(french version)
1950	La Marie du port	Jules Pincemin - le premier oncle	
1950	Miquette	L'évêque	
1950	A Certain Mister	Le commissaire Clergé	
1950	Blonde	Maître Canard	
1950	The Man from Jamaica	Le capitaine Hoggan	
1951	Maître après Dieu	Le pasteur Lewis	
1951	L'enfant des neiges	Le père de Gisèle	
1951	Dakota 308	L'inspecteur Jaillet	
1951	Clara de Montargis	Le mari de Clara	
1951	The Case of Doctor Galloy	Le docteur Clarenz	
1951	Nightclub	Constanzo / Boris Armanian	
1951	Coq en pâte	Maitre Poulard	
1951	The Most Beautiful Girl in the World	Monsieur Dumont	
1951	Le Dindon	Monsieur Pinchard	
1951	Monsieur Octave		
1952	Le Plaisir	Monsieur Tourneveau - le poissonier	(segment "La Maison Tellier")
1952	The Seven Deadly Sins	L'oncle Henri	(segment "Orgueil, L' / Pride")
1952	We Are All Murderers	L'abbé Roussard	
1952	Alone in the World	Le directeur	
1952	Judgement of God	Le bourgmestre d'Augsbourg	
1952	Adorable Creatures	Gaston Lebridel	
1952	Her Last Christmas	Le professeur Valensio	
1952	Holiday for Henrietta	Un scénaristeScript Writer	
1953	The Long Teeth	Antoine Josserand	
1953	The Lovers of Midnight	Monsieur Paul	
1953	Koenigsmark	Le professeur Cyrus Beck	
1953	Les amours finissent à l'aube	Lanzel	
1953	Minuit... Quai de Bercy	Le président Stéphane Andrieux	
1953	The Slave	Le docteur Denis	
1953	Lucrèce Borgia	Le magicien	
1953	The Most Wanted Man	Le directeur de la prison	
1954	Royal Affairs in Versailles	Lavoisier	
1954	Zoé	Monsieur Delay	
1954	Obsession	L'avocat général	
1954	The Beautiful Otero	L'imprésario Robert Martel	
1954	The Lovers of Manon Lescaut	Duca di Forchamps	
1955	The Count of Monte Cristo	Le bijoutier Joannès	
1955	La Rue des bouches peintes	Spears - l'ami d'Oxford	
1955	Montmartre Nights	Inspecteur Doirel	
1955	Les premiers outrages	M. Arnaud - le professeur	
1955	Girls of Today	Morgandi's Father	
1955	Lord Rogue	Le peintre Geoffroy	
1955	Marguerite de la nuit	L'homme de l'hôtel	
1956	Paris, Palace Hotel	Marcel Brugnon	
1957	Miss Catastrophe	Edwin Scott	
1957	The Big Bluff	Le président du conseil d'administration	
1957	Quelle sacrée soirée	Le directeur de salle	
1957	Les Espions	Valette - le morphinomane	
1957	Nathalie	Le commissaire Pipart	
1958	Vengeance	Merlín	
1958	The Possessors	Raoul Leroy	
1958	Would-Be Gentleman	Monsieur Jourdain, bourgeois	
1958	Dangerous Games	Monsieur Leroy-Gomez	
1959	Quay of Illusions	Monsieur Vincent	
1959	Les affreux	Lebreteuil, le président du tribunal	
1959	The Magistrate	Chief Prosecutor Roncuzzi	
1959	Rue des prairies	Le procureur de la République	
1959	Marriage of Figaro	Bartholo	
1959	Eyes of Love	Le chirurgien	
1959	Détournement de mineures	Inspector Max	
1960	The Cossacks	Bibikoff, old Russian General	
1960	Les frangines	Monsieur Maréchal - le directeur de l'institution	
1960	À pleines mains	Le commissaire Toussaint	
1960	School for Scoundrels	Léon Duval	
1960	Le panier à crabes	Jordan	
1960	The Truth	Le président des assises	
1961	The President	Lauzet-Duchet	
1962	Le petit garçon de l'ascenseur	Anselme	
1962	L'Eclisse	Ercoli	
1962	Carillons sans joie	Le colonel du quatrième R.C.A.	
1962	Al otro lado de la ciudad		
1962	Le massaggiatrici	Cipriano Paoloni - the President	
1964	Les amitiés particulières	Le père Lauzon / Father Lauzon	
1966	Black Sun	Gaston Rodier	
1968	Pasha	Le directeur de la police	
1972	Les Rois maudits	Spinello Tolomei	TV Mini-Series, 6 episodes
1973	Forbidden Priests	L'évêque	
1974	Creezy	Garcin	
1975	Special Section	Joseph Barthélemy - le garde des Sceaux	
1975	Bons baisers de Hong Kong	Vannier	
1976	Monsieur Klein	Le père de Robert Klein	
1981	Asphalte	Le vieux monsieur de la casse	
1982	Les Misérables	Monseigneur Myriel	(final film role)
