= The Crowned Fish Tavern =

1947 film

- Directed by: René Chanas
- Written by: René Chanas; Nino Frank; Henri Jeanson
- Produced by: René Chanas; Robert Chabert
- Starring: Michel Simon; Jules Berry; Blanchette Brunoy
- Cinematography: Nikolai Toporkoff
- Edited by: Claude Nicole
- Music by: Jean Martinon
- Production company: Les Acteurs et Techniciens Français
- Distributed by: Francinex
- Release date: 10 December 1947
- Running time: 104 minutes
- Country: France
- Language: French

The Crowned Fish Tavern (French: La taverne du poisson couronné) is a 1947 French drama film directed by René Chanas and starring Michel Simon, Jules Berry and Blanchette Brunoy. It was shot at the Epinay Studios outside Paris. The film's sets were designed by the art director Pierre Marquet.

== Synopsis ==
In a port town captain Palmer returns to discovers that his daughter Maria's husband Leo has abandoned her to take up with another woman Sylvia. Palmer's attempts to confront him and fix the situation leads to the latter's murder in the Crowned Fish tavern of the title for which the wrong man is accused.

== Cast ==
- Michel Simon as Le capitaine Palmer
- Jules Berry as Fléo
- Blanchette Brunoy as Maria
- Raymond Bussières as Monseigneur
- Michèle Martin as Sylvia Corail
- Yves Vincent as Pierre Astor
- Robert Dalban as Cigare
- Léon Larive as L'armateur
- Grégoire Gromoff as Le Bosco
- Émile Riandreys as Clovis
- Henri Arius as Un cafetier
- Harry-Max as Un mécanicien du bateau

== Bibliography ==
- Loubier, Jean-Marc. Michel Simon: Ou Le roman d'un jouisseur. Ramsay, 1989.
- Rège, Philippe. Encyclopedia of French Film Directors, Volume 1. Scarecrow Press, 2009.
