= Alone in the World (film) =

1952 film by René Chanas

- Directed by: René Chanas
- Written by: René Lefèvre
- Produced by: André Paulvé
- Starring: Madeleine Robinson; René Lefèvre; Louis Seigner
- Cinematography: Nikolai Toporkoff
- Edited by: Jacques Poitrenaud
- Production companies: Acteurs et Technicians Alliance Francais; DisCina
- Distributed by: DisCina
- Release date: 11 July 1952
- Running time: 83 minutes
- Country: France
- Language: French

Alone in the World (French: Seuls au monde) is a 1952 French comedy drama film directed by René Chanas and starring Madeleine Robinson, René Lefèvre and Louis Seigner. The film's sets were designed by the art director René Moulaert.

== Synopsis ==
After receiving funds from a wealthy benefactor, François Hermenault establishes a home for underprivileged children. His work is assisted by a dedicated young woman Geneviève.

== Cast ==
- Madeleine Robinson as Geneviève
- René Lefèvre as François Hermenault
- Louis Seigner as Le directeur
- Raymond Cordy as Jules
- Raphaël Patorni as L'avocat
- Marcel Pérès as Morin
- Georgette Anys as Mme Dussaut
- Raymond Rognoni as Lassègue
- Georges Tourreil as Le président du tribunal
- Marcel Josz as Maître Borde
- Jean Ozenne as Campbell
- Marcel Delaître as Maillard
- Marie Albe
- Florence Brière
- André Chanu
- Gilbert Dourlen
- Serge Lecointe
- Robert Lussac
- Georges Paulais
- Solange Sicard as La sage-femme
- Nicolas Vogel

== Bibliography ==
- Parish, Robert. Film Actors Guide. Scarecrow Press, 1977.
