= If It Makes You Happy (film) =

1948 film

- Directed by: Jacques Daniel-Norman
- Written by: Pierre Bernard; Robert Danger; Jacques Daniel-Norman; Jean Manse; Roger Vitrac
- Produced by: Adrien Remaugé
- Starring: Fernandel; Antonin Berval; Mona Dol
- Cinematography: André Germain
- Edited by: James Cuenet
- Music by: Vincent Scotto
- Production company: Pathé Consortium Cinéma
- Distributed by: Pathé Consortium Cinéma
- Release date: 1 September 1948
- Running time: 100 minutes
- Country: France
- Language: French

If It Makes You Happy (French: Si ça peut vous faire plaisir) is a 1948 French comedy film directed by Jacques Daniel-Norman and starring Fernandel, Antonin Berval and Mona Dol. It was shot at the Marseille Studios. The film's sets were designed by the art director Robert Hubert.

== Synopsis ==
Monsieur Viala has the winning ticket to the lottery which he shares with his mistress Ginette. In order to throw his jealous wife of the scent, he pretends that his friend Martial Gonfaron is his fellow winner. However, Ginette begins to show an interest in Martial.

== Cast ==
- Fernandel as Martial Gonfaron
- Antonin Berval as Viala
- Mona Dol as Pauline Viala
- Arlette Merry as Ginette
- Ketty Kerviel as Lyska
- Julien Maffre as Le facteur
- Jackie Sardou as La fleuriste
- José Casa as Camoin
- Auguste Mouriès as Massiera
- Henri Arius as Pilule
- Marsheil as Favoli
- Fernand Sardou as Joseph Castanino

== Bibliography ==
- Bessy, Maurice & Chirat, Raymond. Histoire du cinéma français: encyclopédie des films, 1940–1950. Pygmalion, 1986
- Rège, Philippe. Encyclopedia of French Film Directors, Volume 1. Scarecrow Press, 2009.
