= Janine Darcey =

French actress (1917–1993)

- Born: 14 January 1917; Asnières-sur-Seine, France
- Died: 1 October 1993 (aged 76); Fontenay-les-Briis, France
- Occupation: Actress
- Years active: 1936-1993

Janine Darcey (14 January 1917 – 1 October 1993) was a French film actress. She appeared in 60 films between 1936 and 1993.

== Partial filmography ==
- La tendre ennemie (1936) - La cousine (uncredited)
- Forty Little Mothers (1936)
- The Assault (1936) - La bonne
- La loupiote (1937) - Une entraîneuse
- Trois artilleurs au pensionnat (1937)
- Franco de port (1937)
- Yoshiwara (1937) - Une geisha (uncredited)
- Double crime sur la ligne Maginot (1937)
- Soeurs d'armes (1937)
- Orage (1938) - La serveuse (uncredited)
- Trois artilleurs en vadrouille (1938)
- The Little Thing (1938) - Camille
- The Most Beautiful Girl in the World (1938) - Une midinette
- The Shanghai Drama (1938) - Une élève de l'institution (uncredited)
- The Curtain Rises (1938) - Isabelle
- Je chante (1938) - Denise
- Remontons les Champs-Élysées (1938) - Une biche (uncredited)
- Entente cordiale (1939) - Sylvia Clayton
- Cavalcade d'amour (1939) - Julie
- French Without Tears (1940) - Jacqueline Maingot
- Sixième étage (1940) - Edwige
- The Marvelous Night (1940) - La jeune femme
- Tobias Is an Angel (1940)
- Old Bill and Son (1941) - Françoise
- Parade en sept nuits (1941) - Armande - une amie d'Irène
- Cap au large (1942) - Rose
- Men Without Fear (1942) - Denise
- Les petits riens (1942) - Lucie
- Six Little Girls in White (1942) - Simone
- L'auberge de l'abîme (1943) - Martine
- The Lucky Star (1943) - Mireille
- Le carrefour des enfants perdus (1944) - Andrée Denolle
- Under the Cards (1948) - Fine
- The Mystery of the Yellow Room (1949) - Sylvie
- Return to Life (1949) - Mary (segment 2 : "Le retour d'Antoine")
- Les Compagnes de la nuit (1953) - 2ème assistante
- Children of Love (1953) - Une future mère
- Rififi (1955) - Louise
- Witness in the City (1959) - La propriétaire de l'hôtel
- Two Are Guilty (1963) - Chantal
- Les risques du métier (1967) - Madame Beaudoin - la femme du maire
- The Phantom of Liberty (1974) - La cliente du second médecin (uncredited)
- La Carapate (1978) - La préposée PTT
- L'adolescente (1979)
- Coup de tête (1979) - Mlle Lambert, la secrétaire
- Le Bon Plaisir (1984) - Berthe
- American Dreamer (1984) - Lady on Train
- Le temps d'un instant (1985) - Isa
- To Kill a Priest (1988)
- Moitié-moitié (1989) - Héléna
- The Favour, the Watch and the Very Big Fish (1991) - Old Lady in Park
- Une époque formidable... (1991)
- Un homme et deux femmes (1991) - La tante de Marianne
- Délit mineur (1994) - Yvonne
- Priez pour nous (1994) - Colatte
