= Noëlle Norman =

French actress (1921–1985)

Noelle Norman
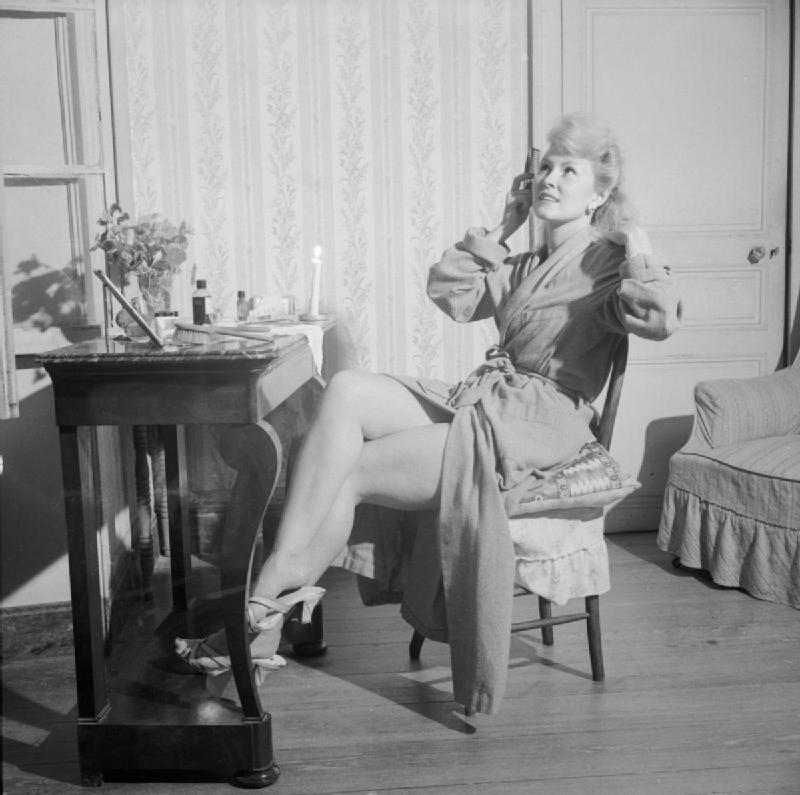
- Noelle Norman (1944)
- Born: 7 January 1921; Paris, France
- Died: 11 January 1985 (aged 64); Villeneuve-sur-Verberie, Oise; France
- Other name: Simone Denise Bruleport
- Occupation: Actress
- Years active: 1938–1959 (film)

Noëlle Norman (7 January 1921 – 11 January 1985) was a French film actress. She appeared in more than thirty films including On demande un assassin (1949).

== Selected filmography ==
- Immediate Call (1939)
- Grandfather (1939)
- It Always Ends That Way (1939)
- Sins of Youth (1941)
- Then We'll Get a Divorce (1940)
- The Blue Veil (1942)
- Mademoiselle Béatrice (1943)
- The Misfortunes of Sophie (1946)
- Vertigo (1947)
- The Adventures of Casanova (1947)
- Emile the African (1949)
- The Paris Waltz (1950)
- Come Down, Someone Wants You (1951)
- Love Is Just a Fairytale (1955)
- Eighteen Hour Stopover (1955)
- The Big Chief (1959)

== Bibliography ==
- Goble, Alan. The Complete Index to Literary Sources in Film. Walter de Gruyter, 1999.
