= Dakota 308 =

1951 film

- Directed by: Jacques Daniel-Norman
- Written by: André-Paul Antoine
- Produced by: Fred d' Orengiani
- Starring: Suzy Carrier; Jean Pâqui; Louis Seigner
- Cinematography: André Germain
- Edited by: James Cuenet
- Music by: Louiguy
- Production company: F.A.O.
- Distributed by: Ciné Sélection
- Release date: 25 April 1951
- Running time: 94 minutes
- Country: France
- Language: French

Dakota 308 is a 1951 French crime film directed by Jacques Daniel-Norman and starring Suzy Carrier, Jean Pâqui and Louis Seigner. The film's sets were designed by the art director Lucien Carré.

== Synopsis ==
The plot concerns a Dakota carrying a shipment of gold to Brazzaville.

== Cast ==
- Suzy Carrier as Clara Sanders
- Jean Pâqui as André Villeneuve
- Louis Seigner as Le commissaire Jaillot
- Roland Toutain as Le pilote
- Marcel Alba
- Paul Amiot as L'inspecteur Joly
- Michel Ardan as Le chauffeur
- Antonin Berval as Le commissaire Baron
- André Burgère as Le directeur du camp
- Robert Burnier as Charpentier
- Al Cabrol as Le timonnier
- Jacques Charon as Lord Vernon
- Jean Daurand as Le radio
- Charles Dechamps as Le directeur de la banque
- Charlotte Ecard as L'infirmière
- Jim Gérald as Van der Edern
- Ketty Kerviel as Lady Vernon
- Julien Maffre as Inspecteur Servais
- Marcel Meral as L'huissier
- Jean Nosserot as Le navigateur
- Palau as Violette

== Bibliography ==
- Philippe Rège. Encyclopedia of French Film Directors, Volume 1. Scarecrow Press, 2009.
