= Gabrielle Fontan =

French actress (1873–1959)

- Born: Gabrielle Marie Joséphine Pène-Castel; 16 April 1873; Bordeaux, France
- Died: 8 September 1959 (aged 86); Juvisy-sur-Orge, France
- Occupation: Actor
- Years active: 1927–1959

Gabrielle Fontan (16 April 1873 – 8 September 1959) was a French film actress. She appeared in more than 120 films between 1927 and 1959.

== Selected filmography ==
- Misdeal (1928)
- The Crime of Sylvestre Bonnard (1929)
- The Ladies in the Green Hats (1929)
- The Lighthouse Keepers (1929)
- My Friend Victor (1931)
- Make a Living (1931)
- Coquecigrole (1931)
- Dainah the Mulatto (1932)
- Toto (1933)
- Gold in the Street (1934)
- Partie de campagne (1936)
- Life Dances On (1937)
- The Ladies in the Green Hats (1937)
- The Little Thing (1938)
- Ramuntcho (1938)
- The Time of the Cherries (1938)
- The Fatted Calf (1939)
- First Ball (1941)
- Sins of Youth (1941)
- Twisted Mistress (1942)
- Eight Men in a Castle (1942)
- The Stairs Without End (1943)
- Mademoiselle Béatrice (1943)
- Strange Inheritance (1943)
- Love Story (1943)
- Picpus (1943)
- The Ménard Collection (1944)
- Night Shift (1944)
- Majestic Hotel Cellars (1945)
- François Villon (1945)
- Her Final Role (1946)
- Pétrus (1946)
- Messieurs Ludovic (1946)
- Sylvie and the Ghost (1946)
- Jericho (1946)
- Destiny (1946)
- The Last Penny (1946)
- Vertigo (1947)
- Night Express (1948)
- After Love (1948)
- Une si jolie petite plage (1949)
- Vertigine d'amore (1949)
- Julie de Carneilhan (1950)
- Quay of Grenelle (1950)
- Juliette, or Key of Dreams (1951)
- Two Pennies Worth of Violets (1951)
- Desperate Decision (1952)
- Flesh and the Woman (1954)
- Les hommes ne pensent qu'à ça (1954)
- Black Dossier (1955)
- Voici le temps des assassins (1956)
- Love Is at Stake (1957)
- A Certain Monsieur Jo (1958)
- First of May (1958)
- Julie the Redhead (1959)
- Maigret and the Saint-Fiacre Case (1959)
