= Colonel Durand =

1948 film

- Directed by: René Chanas
- Written by: Jean Martet (novel); René Chanas
- Starring: Paul Meurisse; Michèle Martin; Louis Seigner
- Cinematography: Roger Dormoy
- Edited by: Denise Baby; Claude Nicole
- Music by: Jean Martinon
- Production company: Acteurs et Technicians Alliance Francais
- Release date: 25 August 1948
- Running time: 110 minutes
- Country: France
- Language: French

Colonel Durand (French: Le colonel Durand) is a 1948 French historical drama film directed by René Chanas and starring Paul Meurisse, Michèle Martin and Louis Seigner.

== Cast ==
- Paul Meurisse as Le colonel d'empire Gérard Durand
- Michèle Martin as Isabelle Patrizzi
- Louis Seigner as Le commandant Millet
- Robert Favart as Bertrand de Lormoy
- Liliane Bert as Mme Hélié
- Frédérique Nadar as Renée de Ponthiers
- Rachel Devirys as Mme Nieburger
- Albert Dinan as Raffart
- Manuel Gary as Bontemps

== Bibliography ==
- Rège, Philippe. Encyclopedia of French Film Directors, Volume 1. Scarecrow Press, 2009.
