= Strange Inheritance (novel) =

1941 novel

- Author: Georges Simenon
- Language: French
- Genre: Mystery
- Publisher: Éditions Gallimard
- Publication date: 1941
- Publication place: France
- Media type: Print
- Pages: 238

Strange Inheritance or The Traveller on All Saints' Day (French: Le voyageur de la Toussaint) is a 1941 mystery novel by the Belgian writer Georges Simenon. It was translated into English by Geoffrey Sainsbury.

== Synopsis ==
On All Saints' Day Gilles Mauvoisin returns home from Norway to his hometown of La Rochelle on the western coast of France. He discovers that his uncle had died several months earlier leaving him his fortune, including a transport company and his house on condition that he allows his family to keep living there. Gilles soon finds that his family are snobbish and resentful, and appear to be hiding a secret about his uncle's death.

== Film adaptation ==
In 1943 it was made into a film Strange Inheritance directed by Louis Daquin and starring Assia Noris and Jules Berry. Henri-Georges Clouzot had earlier attempted to persuade Continental Films to acquire the rights so he could make a film launching a savage attack on French society, however they preferred to purchase the Maigret novels for a series of adaptations.

== Bibliography ==
- Drazin, Charles . The Faber Book of French Cinema. London: Faber & Faber, 2011.
- Goble, Alan. The Complete Index to Literary Sources in Film. Walter de Gruyter, 1999.
- Pendergast, Sara & Pendergast, Tom. Reference Guide to World Literature: Authors. St. James Press, 2003.
