= Jean Daurand =

French actor (1913–1989)

Jean Daurand (1913–1989) was a French actor. He starred in La Nuit Merveilleuse and Derrière la Facade.

== Selected filmography ==
- Rothchild (1933)
- Le secret d'une nuit (1934)
- Pension Mimosas (1935) - Un groom (uncredited)
- Passé à vendre (1936)
- Les grands (1936)
- Nitchevo (1936) - Un matelot
- Les petites alliées (1936) - Un marin
- The Man of the Hour (1937) - Un journaliste (uncredited)
- Double Crime in the Maginot Line (1937) - Un soldat
- Hercule (1938) - Sandwich (uncredited)
- Alert in the Mediterranean (1938) - Le matelot Calas
- Education of a Prince (1938) - Le camarade de Marianne
- Captain Benoit (1938) - Griffon
- Behind the Facade (1939) - Le télégraphiste
- Nord-Atlantique (1939) - Gus
- Latin Quarter (1939) - L'Ablette
- Brazza ou l'épopée du Congo (1940) - Le quartier-maître Hamon
- Sixième étage (1940) - Jojo - le jeune ouvrier
- The Marvelous Night (1940) - Le mari
- La vie est magnifique (1940) - Maurice
- Room 13 (1942) - Le chasseur
- Men Without Fear (1942) - Joseph
- Eight Men in a Castle (1942) - L'acrobate
- Les petits riens (1942)
- After the Storm (1943) - Paul Cerdan
- Home Port (1943) - Marius
- Picpus (1943) - Le coursier (uncredited)
- Départ à zéro (1943) - Coco
- Strange Inheritance (1943) - Un marin (uncredited)
- Love Around the Clock (1943) - L'ouvrier
- Night Shift (1944) - René Favier
- L'enfant de l'amour (1944) - Georges
- The Battle of the Rails (1946) - Cheminot
- The Misfortunes of Sophie (1946) - Antoine Blaise
- Son of France (1946) - Le maréchal des logis Gobert
- Man About Town (1947) - Alfred - un machiniste
- Les jeux sont faits (1947) - Paulo
- Les amours de Blanche Neige (1947)
- Quai des Orfèvres (1947) - L'inspecteur Picard
- The Cupboard Was Bare (1948) - Le jeune marié
- Les dieux du dimanche (1949) - Charles Lambert
- Le paradis des pilotes perdus (1949) - Andrali
- Dakota 308 (1951) - Le radio
- La vie est un jeu (1951)
- My Wife, My Cow and Me (1952)
- Allô... je t'aime (1952) - Le contremaître
- We Are All Murderers (1952) - Girard, l'homme dans la cabine téléphonique
- Beauties of the Night (1952) - Un révolutionnaire (uncredited)
- Love in the Vineyard (1952) - Le deuxième copain
- La fugue de Monsieur Perle (1952) - Le laveur de carreaux de l'hôpital psychiatrique
- The Tour of the Grand Dukes (1953) - Un dragueur au 'Balajo'
- Touchez pas au grisbi (1954) - Un consommateur chez Bouche (uncredited)
- Crime at the Concert Mayol (1954) - Bill
- Huis clos (1954) - Un soldat (uncredited)
- Black Dossier (1955) - Le titi
- People of No Importance (1956) - Un infirmier
- If All the Guys in the World (1956) - Yves
- Gervaise (1956) - Un ouvrier (uncredited)
- Escapade (1957) - L'inspecteur
- The Inspector Likes a Fight (1957) - Un gangster
- Paris Holiday (1958) - (uncredited)
- Police judiciaire (1958) - L'interpellé interdit de séjour
- A Certain Monsieur Jo (1958) - Le cafetier
- Prisons de femmes (1958)
- In Case of Adversity (1958) - Un inspecteur (uncredited)
- Time Bomb (1959) - Pepere
- Witness in the City (1959) - Bernard - un habitué du café
- Quai du Point-du-Jour (1960)
- The Sahara Is Burning (1961) - Bouthier
- Les livreurs (1961) - Bourdier
- In the Affirmative (1964) - Le patron du relais routier
- L'assassin viendra ce soir (1964) - L'adjoint de Serval
- The Curse of Belphegor (1967) - Lefèvre
