= Tino Rossi =

French singer and actor

- Rossi in 1934

Background information
- Born: Constantin Rossi; 29 April 1907; Ajaccio, Corsica, France
- Died: 26 September 1983 (aged 76) Neuilly-sur-Seine, Île-de-France, France
- Genres: Cabaret; French pop
- Occupations: Singer; actor
- Instruments: Vocals, guitar
- Years active: 1932–1982
- Labels: Columbia, Pathe Marconi

Constantin "Tino" Rossi (29 April 1907 – 26 September 1983) was a French singer and film actor.

== Biography ==
=== Early life ===
Rossi was born in Ajaccio, Corsica, and was gifted with a voice well suited for opera. He became a tenor in the French cabaret style. Later, he appeared in various films. During his career, it is reported he recorded over 2000 songs. He appeared in more than 25 films, the most notable of which was the 1954 production, Si Versailles m'était conté... directed by Sacha Guitry. His romantic ballads had especially women swooning and his art songs by Jules Massenet (1842–1912), Reynaldo Hahn (1875–1947), and other composers, sold out theaters wherever he performed.

Among his most famous hits, "Petit Papa Noël" sold over 30 million copies worldwide. Over the course of his 50-year singing career, Tino Rossi recorded over 2000 songs and sold over 200 million albums, making him one of the best-selling artists of all time.

=== Career ===
As a young man, Rossi played guitar and sang in many places in his hometown of Ajaccio, but later he went to perform in Marseille and at resort clubs along the French Riviera. In the early 1930s, he went to Paris and within a few years achieved enormous success, joining a Columbia Records roster that included the biggest stars of that time such as Lucienne Boyer, Damia, Pills et Tabet, Mireille, and Jean Sablon.

Rossi's success was greatly aided by songwriter Vincent Scotto (1876–1952), who wrote his first hits and collaborated with him for many years, composing and arranging many of Rossi's songs. Prior to World War II, Rossi was a major box office attraction in the French-speaking world, and expanded his audience in 1938 to the U.S. and Canada during a first visit there. Rossi began his film career with a role in Les Nuits Moscovites (1934); his first real success came with Marinella (1936).

During the Occupation of France by Nazi Germany, Rossi's film career reached its peak, notably with Fièvres (1942), Le Soleil a toujours raison (1943), Mon amour est près de toi (1943) and L'Île d'amour (1944). Like many celebrities, Tino Rossi was arrested on 7 October 1944 by several police officers in search of information on his close Corsican friend, Étienne Léandri, suspected of active collaborationism. Following three months' detention in the prison of Fresnes, near Paris, during which he stubbornly refused the assistance of a lawyer, he was freed from further detention by a judge, who deemed the charge levelled against him void of substance. Tino Rossi, who, in October 1943, had loaned his personal car to a resistance network to transport weapons and enable several escapes (including that of a general), accepted—an extremely rare action at the time—exceptional official apologies.

In 1946, he recorded his song Petit Papa Noël for a movie. The song remained a classic for the family and sold several million copies after being released on CD in 1992.

He is the recipient of the prestigious musical award Grand Prix du Disque.

== Personal life and honours ==
In 1948, Tino Rossi married Lilia Vetti, a young dancer he had met in 1941 thanks to revue leader Mistinguett. They had one son, musician Laurent (1948–2015), and remained married until Tino's death in 1983.

In 1982, President François Mitterrand named Rossi a Commander of the Legion of Honour for his contributions to French culture. That same year, Rossi gave his last public performance at the Casino de Paris, a show that popular demand turned into a three-month stint.

== Death and legacy ==
Rossi died of pancreatic cancer in 1983 in Neuilly-sur-Seine, France. His body was transported to Ajaccio for burial in the family grave. His wife died in 2003 at the age of 79.

Ajaccio named a street and the sailing harbour in his honour, and in Nogent-sur-Marne, there is a square named Tino Rossi Square. A garden on the banks of the Seine in Paris - the Jardin Tino Rossi - was also named in his honour.

Tino Rossi's unique status on Corsica is reflected in several (somewhat hidden) references to him in the comic book "Asterix in Corsica" (1973) by Uderzo and Goscinny.

== Filmography ==
Year	Title	Role	Notes
1934	Moscow Nights	Le chanteur napolitain	
1935	The Coquelet Affair	Jean Clairval	
1935	Justin de Marseille	Le chanteur	
1935	Adémaï in the Middle Ages	Le troubadour	
1936	Marinella	Tino Pirelli	
1936	Au son des guitares	Jeannot	
1937	The Kiss of Fire	Mario Esposito	
1938	Lights of Paris	Carlo Ferrari	
1942	Fever	Le ténor Jean Dupray	
1943	Le soleil a toujours raison	Tonio	
1943	The Exile's Song	Ramon Etcheverry	
1943	My Love is Near You	Jacques Marton	
1944	The Island of Love	Orsani dit Bicchi	
1946	Song of the Clouds	Sylvio	
1946	Le Gardian	Renaud	
1946	Destiny	André Cartier / Fred Cartier	
1947	The Unknown Singer	Julien Mortal / Paolo	
1949	Two Loves	Sylvain Vincent / Désiré Vincent	
1949	Marlene	Manuel Ceccaldi	
1949	The Pretty Miller Girl	Franz Schubert	
1950	Sending of Flowers	Paul Delmet	
1951	Paris Still Sings	Tino Rossi	
1952	In the Land of the Sun	Titin Olivieri	
1952	Her Last Christmas	Marc Damiani	
1954	Si Versailles m'était conté...	Le gondolier	
1954	Tourments	Jacques Duffot dit Tony Caylor	
1963	Jusqu'au bout du monde		
1970	L'âne de Zigliara	Himself - Lui-même	
