= Mademoiselle Mozart =

- Directed by: Yvan Noé
- Written by: Yvan Noé
- Produced by: Yvan Noé
- Starring: Danielle Darrieux
- Cinematography: Charles Bauer; Robert Lefebvre
- Music by: Walberg
- Production companies: Cinel; Films Yvan Noé
- Release dates: 1935 (France); 1937 (USA)
- Running time: 89 min
- Country: France
- Language: French

Mademoiselle Mozart (US title: Meet Miss Mozart) is a 1935 French comedy/drama genre film directed, produced and written by Yvan Noé.

== Plot ==
A man falls in love with the pretty manager of a store of music instruments, whose business works badly. He is going to re-float the store to conquer her heart.

== Main characters ==
- Danielle Darrieux as Denise, alias Mademoiselle Mozart
- Pierre Mingand as Maxime Lecourtois
- Louis Baron jr. as Alfred Pascoureau
- Pauline Carton as Annette
- Christiane Dor as Suzy
- Pierrette Caillol as Loulou
- Maximilienne as Mme Lecourtois
