= Raphaël Patorni =

French actor (1911–1986)

- Born: 15 April 1911; Paris, France
- Died: 27 November 1986 (aged 75); Neuilly-Sur-Seine, France
- Occupation: Actor
- Years active: 1943–1962 (film)

Raphaël Patorni (1911–1986) was a French film actor.

== Selected filmography ==
- The Mysteries of Paris (1943)
- The Island of Love (1944)
- Jericho (1946)
- The Secret of Florida (1947)
- Vertigo (1947)
- Colomba (1948)
- Barry (1949)
- Doctor Laennec (1949)
- The Martyr of Bougival (1949)
- The Secret of Mayerling (1949)
- The Dancer of Marrakesh (1949)
- God Needs Men (1950)
- Old Boys of Saint-Loup (1950)
- Three Sailors in a Convent (1950)
- Savage Triangle (1951)
- Tomorrow We Get Divorced (1951)
- Adorable Creatures (1952)
- Alone in the World (1952)
- Imperial Violets (1952)
- Napoleon Road (1953)
- Rasputin (1954)
- The Sheep Has Five Legs (1954)
- The Big Flag (1954)
- Rasputin (1954)
- Mademoiselle from Paris (1955)
- The Little Rebels (1955)
- The Whole Town Accuses (1956)
- Every Day Has Its Secret (1958)
- Captain Blood (1960)

== Bibliography ==
- Hayward, Susan. French Costume Drama of the 1950s: Fashioning Politics in Film. Intellect Books, 2010.
