= Jean Douarinou =

- Born: 17 June 1906; Cholon, French Indochina
- Died: 1987 (aged 80–81)
- Occupation: Art Director
- Years active: 1934 - 1967 (film)

Jean Douarinou (1906–1987) was a French art director. He was born in Indochina which was then a French colonial possession. He was the elder brother of the cinematographer Alain Douarinou.

== Selected filmography ==
- Madame Angot's Daughter (1935)
- Three Days Leave (1936)
- Marinella (1936)
- Temptation (1936)
- Life Dances On (1937)
- Men of Prey (1937)
- Cinderella (1937)
- Blanchette (1937)
- The West (1938)
- Troubled Heart (1938)
- Sing Anyway (1940)
- Those of the Sky (1941)
- Six Little Girls in White (1942)
- After the Storm (1943)
- The Stairs Without End (1943)
- A Woman in the Night (1943)
- The White Truck (1943)
- Dorothy Looks for Love (1945)
- Are You Sure? (1947)
- False Identity (1947)
- The Other Side of Paradise (1953)
- Midnight Witness (1953)

== Bibliography ==
- Hayward, Susan. French Costume Drama of the 1950s: Fashioning Politics in Film. Intellect Books, 2010.
