= Jacques Daniel-Norman =

French film director and screenwriter

- Born: Joseph Jacques Compère; 2 December 1901; Lyon
- Died: 2 December 1978 (aged 77); Paris
- Occupation(s): Film director, screenwriter
- Spouse: Ketty Kerviel

Jacques Daniel-Norman (real name Joseph Jacques Compère (2 December 1901 – 5 December 1978) was a French film director and screenwriter.

== Filmography ==
=== Director ===
- 1937 : If You Return
- 1938 : Prince of My Heart
- 1940 : Marseille My Loves
- 1941 : The Chain Breaker
- 1942 : The Law of Spring
- 1943 : Don't Shout It from the Rooftops
- 1944 : Adventure is Just Around the Corner
- 1946 : 120, Gare Street
- 1946 : Monsieur Grégoire Escapes
- 1947 : The Three Cousins
- 1948 : The Diamond of the Cent
- 1948 : If It Makes You Happy
- 1948 : The Woman I Murdered
- 1949 : The Red Angel
- 1951 : Heart-on-the-Sea
- 1951 : Dakota 308
- 1952 : Her Last Christmas
- 1954 : Tourments
- 1961 : Alerte au barrage

=== Screenwriter ===
(of his own films unless otherwise stated)

- 1935 : Un soir de bombe by Maurice Cammage
- 1936 : Une femme qui se partage by Maurice Cammage
- 1936 : Bach the Detective by René Pujol
- 1937 : The Beauty of Montparnasse by Maurice Cammage
- 1938 : Prince de mon cœur
- 1940 : Marseille mes amours
- 1942 : The Law of Spring
- 1944 : L'aventure est au coin de la rue
- 1946 : 120, Gare Street
- 1946 : Monsieur Grégoire s'évade
- 1947 : Les Trois Cousines
- 1948 : Si ça peut vous faire plaisir
- 1950 : The New Masters by Paul Nivoix
- 1949 : L'Ange rouge
- 1951 : Cœur-sur-Mer
- 1952 : Son dernier Noël
- 1954 : Tourments
