= The White Squadron (1949 film) =

1949 film

- Directed by: René Chanas
- Written by: René Chanas; René Lefèvre
- Based on: The White Squadron by Joseph Peyré
- Produced by: René Chanas
- Starring: Jean Chevrier; René Lefèvre; Michèle Martin
- Cinematography: Nikolai Toporkoff
- Edited by: Lola Barache
- Music by: Jean Wiener
- Production company: Acteurs et Techniciens Associés du Cinéma
- Distributed by: Ciné Sélection
- Release date: 1 July 1949
- Running time: 104 minutes
- Country: France
- Language: French

The White Squadron (French: L'escadron blanc) is a 1949 French adventure film directed by René Chanas and starring Jean Chevrier, René Lefèvre and Michèle Martin. It is based on the 1931 novel of the same title by Joseph Peyré, which was made into a 1936 Italian film The White Squadron. The film's sets were designed by the art director Jean-Roger Bertrand. Location shooting took place around Adrar in the Sahara Desert in French Algeria. Members of the Saharan Companies of the French Foreign Legion appeared as themselves in the film.

== Synopsis ==
A squadron of French mounted troops carry out a dangerous mission in a remote part of Algeria. When the captain is killed, his second-in-command takes over and successfully leads the remaining troops back to their base.

== Cast ==
- Jean Chevrier as Le capitaine Marsay
- René Lefèvre as L'adjudant Devars
- François Patrice as Le lieutenant Kermeur
- Michèle Martin as Madame Marsay

== Bibliography ==
- Goble, Alan. The Complete Index to Literary Sources in Film. Walter de Gruyter, 1999.
- Rège, Philippe. Encyclopedia of French Film Directors, Volume 1. Scarecrow Press, 2009.
