= René Chanas =

French film director, screenwriter and film producer

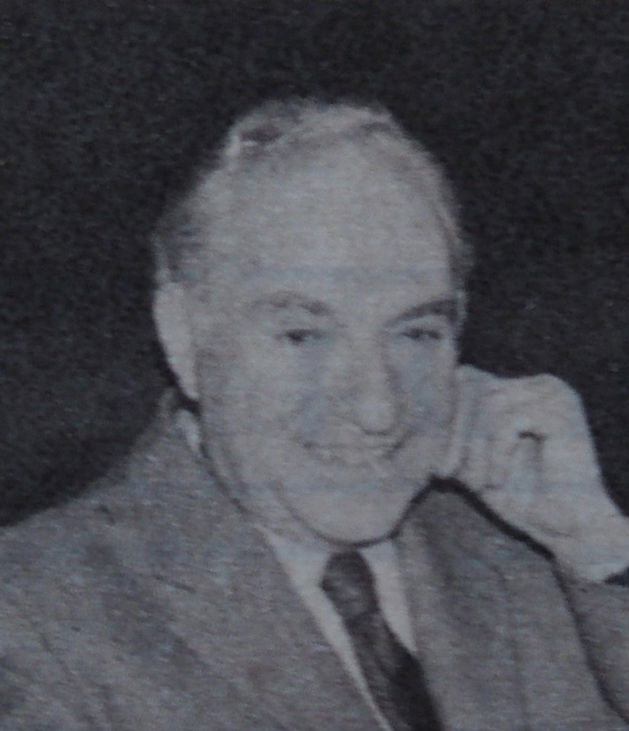
- Born: René Lindecker; 13 September 1913; Paris
- Died: 9 July 1990 (aged 76); 12th arrondissement of Paris
- Occupation(s): Film director, screenwriter, producer

René Chanas, real name René Lindecker (13 September 1913 - 9 July 1990) was a French film director, screenwriter, and film producer.

== Filmography ==
=== Director ===
- 1945: The Last Judgment
- 1947: The Crowned Fish Tavern
- 1948: La Carcasse et le Tord-cou
- 1948: Colonel Durand
- 1949: The White Squadron
- 1951: Un sourire dans la tempête (film with two versions)
- 1951 : Ein Lächeln im Sturm (film with two versions)
- 1952: Alone in the World
- 1953: Je suis un mouchard
- 1954: La Patrouille des sables

=== Screenwriter ===
- 1947: La Taverne du poisson couronné
- 1948: Le Colonel Durand
- 1951: Un sourire dans la tempête
- 1953: Je suis un mouchard
- 1954: La Patrouille des sables (film with two versions)
- 1954: Tres hombres van a morir (film with two versions)

=== Producer ===
- 1950: Un sourire dans la tempête (Line producer)
- 1951: Ein Lächeln im Sturm (producer)
