= Yvan Noé =

French playwright (1895–1963)

- Born: 18 May 1895; Nancy, Meurthe-et-Moselle, France
- Died: 7 July 1963 (aged 68); Nice, Alpes-Maritimes, France
- Occupations: Director, Writer
- Years active: 1931 - 1963 (film)

Yvan Noé (1895–1963) was a French playwright, screenwriter and film director. He was married to the actress Pierrette Caillol who sometimes performed alongside him.

== Selected filmography ==
- Gloria (1931)
- Mademoiselle Mozart (1935)
- The Blue Danube (1940)
- Those of the Sky (1941)
- Men Without Fear (1942)
- Six Little Girls in White (1942)
- A Friend Will Come Tonight (1946)
- Secret Cargo (1947)
- Dominique (1950)
- Guilty? (1951)

== Bibliography ==
- Jonathan Driskell. The French Screen Goddess: Film Stardom and the Modern Woman in 1930s France. I.B.Tauris, 2015.
