= Léonce Perret filmography (director) =

A definitive filmography for Léonce Perret would be virtually impossible given that he wrote, acted in, directed or produced more than 400 films. Of those, only roughly one third are still available today. The remaining copies are stored mostly at the Gaumont Film Library, the Cinémathèque française, the Centre national du cinéma et de l'image animée and in several other European film libraries such as the Nederlands Filmmuseum in Amsterdam.

== Director ==
| Year | Movie | Other notes |
|---|---|---|
| 1909 | Molière (shot in Berlin) | |
| 1909 | Pourquoi la guerre? (shot in Berlin) | |
| 1909 | Le bon juge (shot in Berlin) | |
| 1909 | Le berceau (shot in Berlin) | |
| 1909 | Vers l'immortalité (shot in Berlin) | |
| 1909 | Fanfan, le petit grenadier (shot in Berlin) | |
| 1909 | Noël d'artiste | |
| 1909 | Le lys d'or | |
| 1909 | Le truc de l'antiquaire | |
| 1909 | L'échafaudage | |
| 1909 | La lettre au petit Jésus | |
| 1909 | Monsieur Prud'homme fait faire sa statue | |
| 1909 | Le Portrait de Mireille | |
| 1909 | Le Mystère du château des roches noires | |
| 1909 | La Tournée des grands ducs | |
| 1910 | Monsieur Prud'homme s'émancipe | |
| 1910 | La Fille de Jephté | |
| 1910 | Le Vertige | |
| 1910 | Les Lettres | |
| 1910 | Mam'zelle Figaro | |
| 1910 | Ménages parisiens | |
| 1910 | L'Alibi | |
| 1910 | Le Bon exemple | |
| 1910 | Le Noël de grand-mère | |
| 1910 | Le Soupçon | |
| 1910 | Le Cœur n'a pas d'âge | |
| 1910 | L'Absente | |
| 1910 | Le Cousin de Cendrillon | |
| 1910 | Les Martigues | |
| 1910 | Les Deux douleurs | |
| 1910 | Les Deux hommes | |
| 1910 | L'Escapade de Bob | |
| 1910 | L'Amour guette | |
| 1910 | Le Baiser du pâtre | |
| 1910 | Les Lacs italiens | |
| 1910 | Le Rendez-vous | |
| 1910 | Le Sacrifice d'Yvonne | |
| 1910 | Lorsque l'enfant paraît | |
| 1910 | Le Bon juge | |
| 1910 | L'Ambition d'Agénor le Chauve | |
| 1910 | Bonne année | |
| 1910 | Le Bon Samaritain | |
| 1910 | Le Cheveu blanc | |
| 1910 | Le Crime du grand-père | |
| 1910 | L'Emmurée des Balkans | |
| 1910 | La Garde-barrière | |
| 1910 | Le Gardian de Camargue ou Gardian de la Camargue | |
| 1910 | Le Jeu des amoureux | |
| 1910 | Jeunesse | |
| 1910 | Mimosa | |
| 1910 | Petite mère | |
| 1910 | Le Portrait ovale | |
| 1910 | La Sacrifiée | |
| 1910 | La Visite du pasteur | |
| 1911 | La Peau de l'ours | |
| 1911 | Fidèle | |
| 1911 | L'Étendard | |
| 1911 | L'Automne du cœur | |
| 1911 | Mariage par le cinématographe ou Un mariage par le cinéma | |
| 1911 | Eugène amoureux | |
| 1911 | Titine et Totor | |
| 1911 | Dans la vie | |
| 1911 | Monsieur Prud'homme joue la comédie | |
| 1911 | L'Âme du violon | |
| 1911 | Les Béquilles | |
| 1911 | La Cure de solitude | |
| 1911 | Le Haleur | |
| 1911 | Le Moïse du moulin | |
| 1911 | Le Mauvais berger | |
| 1911 | L'Amour qui tue | |
| 1911 | Les Bords de la Meuse | |
| 1911 | Les Cascatelles du Houyoux ou Rives et cascatelles du Houyoux | |
| 1911 | Bacchus et Cupidon | |
| 1911 | La Petite Béarnaise | |
| 1911 | Le premier pas | |
| 1911 | Tu t'en iras, jeunesse | |
| 1911 | La Mine en feu ou Le Feu à la mine | |
| 1911 | L'innocent | |
| 1911 | La Lettre de Zézette | |
| 1911 | La Rose bleue | |
| 1911 | Nuit tragique | |
| 1911 | Cupidon aux manœuvres | |
| 1911 | Le Trafiquant | |
| 1911 | L'Ermite ou La Paix du vieil ermite | |
| 1911 | Comment on les prend | |
| 1911 | La Pensée de l'enfant | |
| 1911 | On ne joue pas avec le cœur | |
| 1911 | Comment on les garde | |
| 1911 | Amour et science | |
| 1911 | Le Bon jardinier | |
| 1911 | L'Oiseau blessé | |
| 1911 | Le Galant notaire | |
| 1911 | Ces bons cousins | |
| 1911 | L'Amour et l'argent | |
| 1911 | Les Deux huissiers | |
| 1911 | Le Galant commissaire | |
| 1911 | Gisèle part en pension | |
| 1911 | Papa printemps | |
| 1911 | Voyage en Saxe | |
| 1911 | Le lys brisé | |
| 1911 | Dans la vie | |
| 1911 | La Paix du foyer | |
| 1911 | Séance de spiritisme | |
| 1911 | L'Attentat | |
| 1911 | Maternité ou Cœur de mère | |
| 1911 | Gisèle, enfant terrible | |
| 1911 | Le Rival de Chérubin | |
| 1912 | Plus fort que la haine | |
| 1912 | Le Chrysanthème rouge | |
| 1912 | La Dette d'honneur | |
| 1912 | Marget et Benedict | |
| 1912 | Le Mystère des roches de Kador | |
| 1912 | Nanine, femme d'artiste | |
| 1912 | Le Mariage de minuit | |
| 1912 | Main de fer contre la bande aux gants blancs | |
| 1912 | Main de fer | |
| 1912 | L'Express matrimonial | |
| 1912 | Un nuage | |
| 1912 | Léonce fait des gaffes | |
| 1912 | Graziella la gitane | |
| 1912 | La Lumière et l'Amour | |
| 1912 | L'Espalier de la marquise | |
| 1912 | Un coq en pâte | |
| 1912 | La Rançon du bonheur | |
| 1912 | La Rochelle | |
| 1912 | Les Blouses blanches | |
| 1912 | La Fille du margrave | |
| 1912 | Le Cœur et l'Argent The Heart and the Money | |
| 1912 | Le Tourment | |
| 1912 | Cœur d'enfant | |
| 1912 | Manœuvres à bord d'un cuirassé | |
| 1912 | Manœuvres d'escadre | |
| 1912 | Le Mariage de Suzie | |
| 1912 | Le Mariage de Ketty | |
| 1912 | La Bonne hôtesse | |
| 1912 | Les Chandeliers | |
| 1912 | Une perle | |
| 1912 | Laquelle ? | |
| 1912 | La Visite du pasteur | |
| 1912 | La Lumière et l'amour | |
| 1912 | Les Lys | |
| 1912 | Le Lien | |
| 1912 | La Petite duchesse | |
| 1912 | La Conquête d'Aurélia | |
| 1912 | La Vie à bord d'un cuirassé | |
| 1912 | Le Béret | |
| 1912 | Une leçon d'amour | |
| 1913 | Léonce voyage | |
| 1913 | Léonce et la bouillotte | |
| 1913 | Léonce à la campagne | |
| 1913 | Main de fer et l'évasion du forçat de Croze | |
| 1913 | Léonce en voyage de noces | |
| 1913 | Léonce en ménage | |
| 1913 | Les Épingles | |
| 1913 | Un cœur de poupée | |
| 1913 | Léonce et les écrevisses | |
| 1913 | Léonce flirte | |
| 1913 | Léonce veut divorcer | |
| 1913 | Léonce pot-au-feu | |
| 1913 | Léonce célibataire | |
| 1913 | Léonce fait du reportage | |
| 1913 | Léonce et Toto | |
| 1913 | Léonce veut maigrir | |
| 1913 | Léonce et sa tante | |
| 1913 | Léonce et son conseil judiciaire | |
| 1913 | Léonce papillonne | |
| 1913 | Léonce et Poupette | |
| 1913 | L'Apollon des roches noires | |
| 1913 | Le Homard | |
| 1913 | L'Enfant de Paris | |
| 1913 | Les Bretelles | |
| 1913 | Léonce cinématographiste | |
| 1913 | Le Collier de Nini Pinson | |
| 1913 | Les Fiancés de l'air | |
| 1913 | La Belle-mère de Léonce | |
| 1913 | Léonce aime les morilles | |
| 1913 | Léonce au château d'If | |
| 1913 | L'Ange de la maison | |
| 1913 | Léonce a des rhumatismes | |
| 1913 | Quatre me suffiront | |
| 1913 | Au fond du gouffre | |
| 1913 | Les Audaces de cœur | |
| 1913 | Sur la voie | |
| 1913 | Par l'amour | |
| 1913 | La Force de l'argent | |
| 1913 | Le Champion du trombone | |
| 1913 | Les Dents de fer | |
| 1913 | La Dentellière | |
| 1913 | Les Fiancés de l'air | |
| 1914 | Léonce n'est pas frileux | |
| 1914 | Léonce aux bains de mer | |
| 1914 | Léonce et les poissons rouges | |
| 1914 | Léonce a le mal de mer | |
| 1914 | Léonce a le mal d'amour | |
| 1914 | Léonce aime les petits pieds | |
| 1914 | Léonce l'est-il? | |
| 1914 | Son excellence | |
| 1914 | Léonce veut se suicider | |
| 1914 | La Voix de la patrie | |
| 1914 | La Tourmente | |
| 1914 | Le Rachat du passé | |
| 1914 | Les roses de la vie | |
| 1914 | La Bretagne pittoresque | |
| 1914 | Sur la côte d'argent | |
| 1914 | L'Aventure de Monsieur Smith | |
| 1914 | Le Roman d'un mousse | |
| 1914 | Fauves et bandits | |
| 1914 | Mort au champ d'honneur | |
| 1915 | Léonce et le bain du préfet | |
| 1915 | Léonce flûtiste | |
| 1915 | L'Autre devoir | |
| 1915 | Léonce papa | |
| 1915 | Léonce jardinier | |
| 1915 | Léonce aime les Belges | |
| 1915 | L'Autre devoir | |
| 1915 | Leur kultur | |
| 1915 | L'Heure du rêve | |
| 1915 | Léonce flûtiste | |
| 1915 | Léonce papa | |
| 1915 | Léonce et le bain du préfet | |
| 1915 | Françaises, veillez ! | |
| 1915 | France et Angleterre, for ever | |
| 1915 | Léonce jardinier | |
| 1915 | Le Héros de l'Yser | |
| 1915 | Une page de gloire | |
| 1915 | Aimer, pleurer, mourir | |
| 1915 | L'Énigme de la Riviera | |
| 1915 | Tante Lolotte | |
| 1915 | Léonce aime les Belges | |
| 1916 | Léonce s'émancipe | |
| 1916 | Léonce poète | |
| 1916 | Je le suis | |
| 1916 | C'est pour les orphelines | |
| 1916 | Léonce en vacances | |
| 1916 | Printemps du cœur | |
| 1916 | L'X noir | |
| 1916 | L'Empreinte du passé | |
| 1916 | Les Deux milles blondes du père Dubreuil | |
| 1916 | Debout les morts ! | |
| 1916 | Dernier amour | |
| 1916 | Notre pauvre cœur | |
| 1916 | Léonce s'émancipe | |
| 1916 | Les Mystères de l'ombre | |
| 1916 | Les Poilus de la revanche | |
| 1916 | Le Roi de la montagne | |
| 1916 | Qui ? | |
| 1916 | Léonce poète | |
| 1916 | Je le suis | |
| 1916 | La Fiancée du diable | |
| 1916 | Un mariage de raison | |
| 1916 | Marraines de France | |
| 1916 | Le Retour du passé | |
| 1916 | Léonce en vacances | |
| 1916 | Les Bobines d'or | |
| 1916 | L'Angélus de la victoire | |
| 1916 | Les Armes de la femme | |
| 1916 | La Belle aux cheveux d'or | |
| 1917 | L'Esclave de Phidias | |
| 1917 | Devoir | |
| 1917 | L'Imprévu | |
| 1917 | La main du maître (The Silent Master, shot in the United States) | |
| 1917 | Folie d'amour (The Mad Lover, shot in the United States) | |
| 1918 | Lune de miel imprévue (The Accidental Honeymoon) | |
| 1918 | N'oublions jamais (Lest We Forget) | |
| 1918 | Princesse voilée (La Fayette, We Come) | |
| 1918 | Le million des sœurs jumelles (The Million Dollar Dollies) | |
| 1919 | L'ABC de l'amour (A.B.C. Of Love) | |
| 1919 | L'Avidité (The Twin Pawns) aka The Curse of Greed | |
| 1919 | Etoiles de gloire (The Unknown Love) | |
| 1919 | La Treizième chaise (The Thirteen Chair) | |
| 1920 | Une Salomé moderne (A Modern Salomé) | |
| 1920 | L'Empire des diamants (Empire Of Diamonds) | |
| 1920 | La flétrissure (Tarnished Reputations) | |
| 1920 | L'étreinte du passé (film de Léonce Perret) (Lifting Shadows) | |
| 1921 | The Money Maniac | |
| 1922 | L'Écuyère | |
| 1923 | Kœnigsmark | |
| 1925 | Madame Sans-Gêne | |
| 1925 | La Femme nue | |
| 1926 | Printemps d'amour | |
| 1927 | La Danseuse Orchidée | |
| 1927 | Morgane, the Enchantress | |
| 1929 | La Possession | |
| 1929 | Poliche (Der nar Seiner Lieber) | |
| 1930 | Arthur | |
| 1930 | Quand nous étions deux | |
| 1930 | Après l'amour (film de Léonce Perret) | |
| 1930 | Beauty Spot | |
| 1932 | Abduct Me | |
| 1933 | Il était une fois | |
| 1934 | Sapho | |
| 1934 | Les Précieuses ridicules | |
| 1935 | Les Deux couverts | |
