= The Lady of Lebanon =

The Lady of Lebanon may refer to:

- The Lady of Lebanon (novel), a 1924 novel by Pierre Benoit
- The Lady of Lebanon (1926 film), a French silent drama film
- The Lady of Lebanon (1934 film), a French thriller film
