= Koenigsmark (1935 film) =

1935 film directed by Maurice Tourneur

- Directed by: Maurice Tourneur
- Written by: André-Paul Antoine; René Champigny; Léonce Perret
- Based on: Koenigsmark by Pierre Benoît
- Produced by: Emile Natan; Roger Richebé; Max Schach
- Starring: Pierre Fresnay; Elissa Landi; John Lodge; Antonin Artaud
- Cinematography: Victor Arménise
- Edited by: Marguerite Renoir
- Music by: Jacques Ibert
- Production companies: Capitol Film Corporation; Les Films Roger Richebé
- Distributed by: Paris Cinéma Location (France); General Film Distributors (UK)
- Release dates: October 1935 (UK); 5 December 1935 (France)
- Running time: 96 minutes
- Countries: France; United Kingdom
- Language: English

Koenigsmark is a 1935 British-French drama film directed by Maurice Tourneur and starring Elissa Landi, John Lodge and Pierre Fresnay.

The film is based on the novel Koenigsmark by Pierre Benoît and produced in separate French and English-language versions. It was shot at the Joinville Studios in Paris, with sets designed by the art director Lucien Aguettand. The film was known in the United States as Crimson Dynasty.

== Plot ==
Aurore, a Russian-born princess living in Paris has an arranged marriage to Grand Duke Rodolphe of a small German principality, part of the wider German Empire. Although she doesn't love her husband, she is very fond of him. When he departs to take part in an intelligence operation in Africa on the orders of the Kaiser, his wife gives him a locket as a memento of her. In his absence, the Princess battles for control of the state with her brother-in-law Frederick, particularly when news arrives from Africa that Grand Duke Rodolphe has died of disease.

A young Frenchman Raoul Vignerte is hired to act as the tutor for Frederick's young son. He gradually strikes up a friendship with the widowed Princess. Vignerte is working on research into the tragic historical romance between Sophia Dorothea and Philip Christoph von Königsmarck. While investigating he discovers a secret passage in the castle and finds a skeleton hidden there, holding the locket. It becomes clear that Frederick had his brother Rodolphe murdered before he even left the castle and the story of his dying in Africa has been faked. Discovering that his plan has been uncovered, Frederick starts a fire that destroys much of the evidence.

As the outbreak of the First World War approaches, the Princess drives Raoul to safety from arrests across the border, and then returns to confront Frederick. Faced with exposure he shoots himself, at which point the Princess abdicates, not wishing to take part in the war against Russia or France.

== Cast ==
- Pierre Fresnay as Raoul Vignerte
- Elissa Landi as Princess Aurore
- John Lodge as Grand Duke Frederick
- Antonin Artaud as Cyrus Back
- Frank Vosper as Maj. Baron de Boise
- Jean-Max as Le commandant de Boose
- Allan Jeayes as Grand Duke Rodolphe
- Romilly Lunge as Lt de Hagen
- Jean Yonnel as Le grand-duc Rodolphe
- Jean Debucourt as Le lieutenant de Hagen
- Marcelle Rogez as Comtesse Mélusine
- Georges Prieur as Le prince Tumène
- André Dubosc as Le roi
- Roger Puylagarde as Monsieur de Marçais
- Clary Monthal
- Jacques Henley
- Maurice Devienne
- Léon Courtois
- André Lannes
- Cecil Humphreys as De Marçaise
- Hay Petrie as Professor
- H.G. Stoker

== See also ==
- Koenigsmark (1923)
- Koenigsmark (1953)

== Bibliography ==
- Low, Rachael. Filmmaking in 1930s Britain. George Allen & Unwin, 1985.
- Wood, Linda. British Films, 1927-1939. British Film Institute, 1986.
