= Solène Debiès =

French graphic artist and illustrator

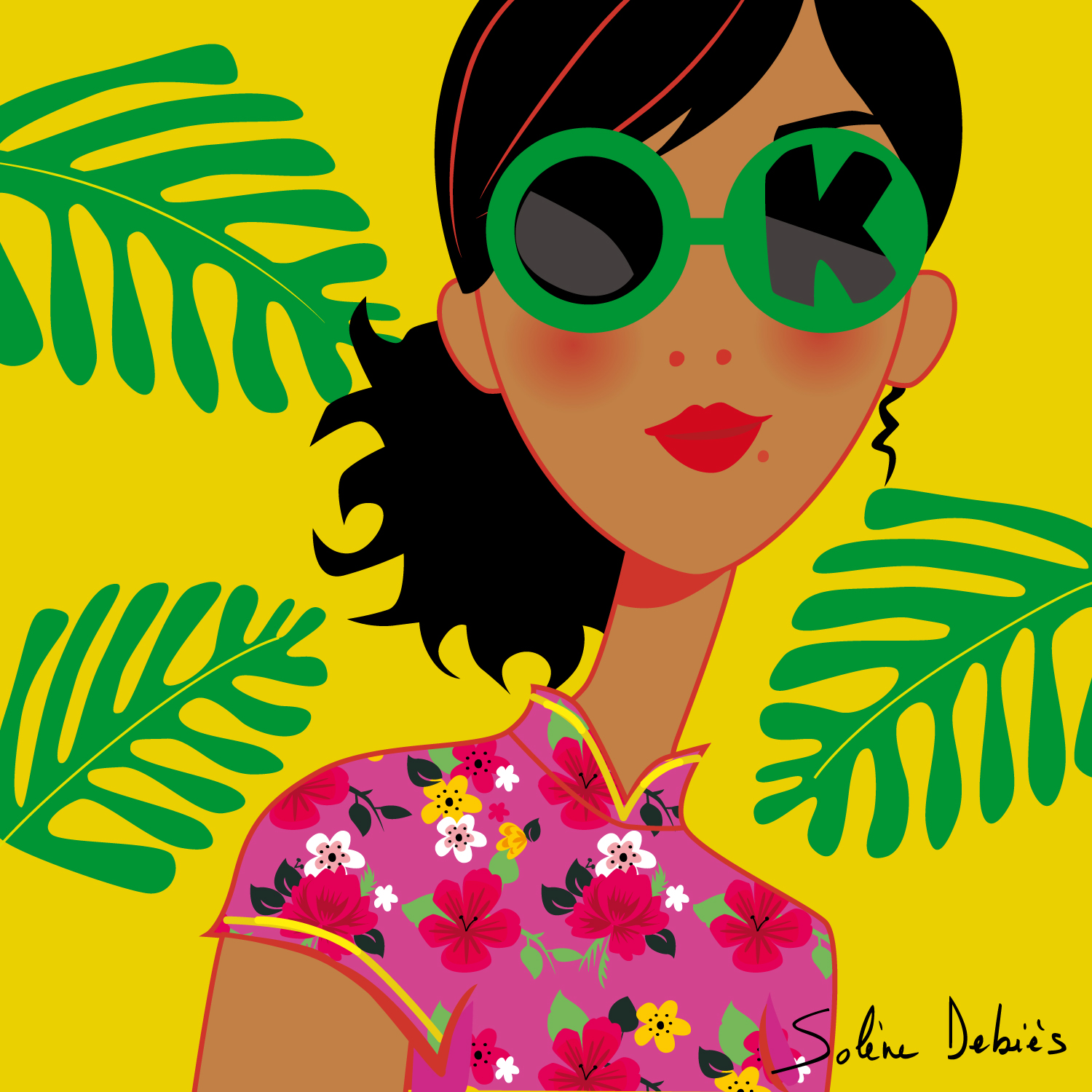
- Born: 20 July 1975 (age 51); Brest, France
- Website: https://www.solenedebies.com/en/

Solène Debiès (born 20 July 1975) is a French graphic artist and illustrator.

== Biography ==
Solène Debiès was graduated from the Pivaut school of Applied Arts and Narrative Drawing in Nantes in 1996.

After starting her professional life as a graphic designer in an advertising agency, she started illustrating in 2000, and began to work for the press, in publishing and advertising. She tends to draw characters in a graphic and colorful style.

She drew for newspapers such as Elle (India) (from 2005 to 2013), Harper's Bazaar (India), S Magazine (UK), Biba (France), Marie-Claire (France), Le Figaro (France), or Nail Pro (US).

She illustrated the book of the humorist Olivier Giraud "The (very) practical guide to the perfect Parisian" and the women from Cannes for the "sales & the city" campaigns shown in the town hall of Cannes.

In 2019, she is quoted as being one of 5 French illustrators to follow on Instagram by the magazine Bewaremag.

== Illustrations ==
=== Press ===
Elle (India), Harper's Bazaar (India), Biba, Le Figaro, Marie-Claire, Version Femina, Nail Pro (USA), Parenting (USA), S Magazine (UK), Magnifique by Cristina sur TEVA, Jeune et Jolie, Marie-France, Gala.

=== Books ===
- Comme des soeurs, Elisabeth Craft, Sarah Fain, Le Livre de Poche Jeunesse, 6 oct. 2010, (ill. Solène Debiès) ISBN 978-2-01-322893-0
- Le jour où j'ai voulu devenir populaire, Meg Cabot, Le Livre de Poche Jeunesse, 09 juin 2010, (Ill. Solène Debiès) ISBN 978-2-01-322321-8
- Les coups d'food de Farida, Farida, éditions du Chêne, 2 mai 2012, (ill. Solène Debiès) ISBN 978-2-8123-0537-5
- Mini-kit de survie de la nana bio, Marie Beuzard, Isabelle Delannoy, éditions Eyrolles, 10 janv. 2013, (ill. Solène Debiès) ISBN 978-2-212-55501-1
- Down dog Billionaire, Lucy Edge (ill. Solène Debiès), 27 juil. 2015 ISBN 978-0-9933341-0-8
- Guide (très) pratique du parfait parisien, Olivier Giraud, French arrogance prod, (ill. Solène Debiès), 24 nov. 2018 ISBN 978-2-9566023-0-9
- So Nice !, Tomes 1 à 4, Carolyn Chouinard, Laura Boisvert, éditions dominique et compagnie (ill. Solène Debiès) ISBN 978-2-89739-323-6 - ISBN 978-2-89739-546-9 - ISBN 978-2-89739-818-7
- Journal d'une princesse, Tomes 1 à 11, Meg Cabot, éditions Hachette Roman, (ill. Solène Debiès)
1. ISBN 978-2-01-397117-1
2. ISBN 978-2-01-397118-8
3. ISBN 978-2-01-397119-5
4. ISBN 978-2-01-397120-1
5. ISBN 978-2-01-397121-8
6. ISBN 978-2-01-397122-5
7. ISBN 978-2-01-397123-2
8. ISBN 978-2-01-161147-5
- Anna et son fantôme, Tomes 1 et 2, Franck Krebs, (ill. Solène Debiès) ISBN 978-2-01-204437-1
- Miss Parfaite, Frédérique Dufort, éditions Boomerang, nov. 2018, (ill. Solène Debiès) ISBN 978-2-89709-307-5
- Un karma presque parfait, Roxane Dambre, éditions Calmann-Lévy ISBN 978-2-7021-6171-5
- Un appart de rêve, Roxane Dambre, éditions Calmann-Lévy, 2 mai 2019, (ill. Solène Debiès) ISBN 978-2-7021-6541-6
