= Boissière (film) =

1937 film

- Directed by: Fernand Rivers
- Written by: Fernand Rivers; Pierre Benoit
- Based on: Boissière by Pierre Benoit
- Produced by: Fernand Rivers
- Starring: Andrée Spinelly; Pierre Renoir; Suzanne Desprès
- Cinematography: Jean Bachelet
- Edited by: Roger Mercanton
- Music by: Henri Verdun
- Production company: Les Films Fernand Rivers
- Distributed by: D.U.C.
- Release date: 27 May 1937
- Running time: 91 minutes
- Country: France
- Language: French

Boissière is a 1937 French war drama film directed by Fernand Rivers and starring Andrée Spinelly, Pierre Renoir and Suzanne Desprès. It is an adaptation of the 1935 novel of the same title by Pierre Benoit. The film's sets were designed by the art director Robert Gys.

== Cast ==
- Andrée Spinelly as Adlone Hébert
- Pierre Renoir as Le général baron von Hubner
- Suzanne Desprès as Catherine Vandehove
- Lucien Nat as Jean Le Barois
- Pauline Carton as Estelle
- Andrée Ducret as Madame Le Barois
- Augustine Prieur as Françoise Faget
- Paulette Élambert as La petite Lucile
- Ducellier as La mère Thérèse
- Marie Marcilly as Une vieille femme
- Jean Yonnel as Hector Le Barois
- Serge Grave as Le petit Jean
- Rivers Cadet as Estève
- Jean Périer as Charles Le Barois
- Paul Velsa as Vigouroux
- Ernest Ferny as Walrand
- Henri Darcet as L'imitateur de Maillol

== Bibliography ==
- Bessy, Maurice & Chirat, Raymond. Histoire du cinéma français: 1935-1939. Pygmalion, 1986.
- Crisp, Colin. Genre, Myth and Convention in the French Cinema, 1929-1939. Indiana University Press, 2002.
- Goble, Alan. The Complete Index to Literary Sources in Film. Walter de Gruyter, 1999.
- Rège, Philippe. Encyclopedia of French Film Directors, Volume 1. Scarecrow Press, 2009.
