= Léonce Perret filmography (actor) =

A definitive filmography for Léonce Perret would be virtually impossible given that he wrote, acted in, directed or produced more than 400 films. Of those more than 400 films, only roughly one third are still available today. The remaining copies are stored mostly at the Gaumont Film Library, the French Film Library, the National Cinematography Film Archives and in several other European film libraries such as the Nederlands Filmmuseum in Amsterdam.

== Actor ==
Year	Movie	Other notes
1909	Judith et Holopherne of Louis Feuillade	
1909	Le Miroir magique of Louis Feuillade	
1909	Le Voile des nymphes of Louis Feuillade	
1909	La Fiancée du batelier of Louis Feuillade	
1909	Au temps de la chouannerie of Louis Feuillade	
1909	Le Bon samaritain of Louis Feuillade	
1909	André Chenier de Étienne Arnaud	
1909	La Légende de Daphné de Louis Feuillade	
1909	Le Festin de Balthazar de Louis Feuillade	
1909	Molière	
1909	Monsieur Prud'homme fait faire sa statue	
1909	Le Portrait de Mireille	
1910	Monsieur Prud'homme s'émancipe : Monsieur Prud'homme (part played by Léonce Perret)	
1910	Jour d'échéance : Duvaldy the painter	
1910	Esther de Louis Feuillade	
1910	La Fille de Jephté	
1910	Le Vertige : Doctor Ménart	
1911	La Peau de l'ours : Henry Dorlandy	
1911	Fidèle de Léonce Perret	
1911	L'Orgie romaine (A Roman Orgy)	
1911	Le Mariage de Zanetto : Monseigneur Le Duc	
1911	Le Fils de la Sunamite	
1911	L'Étendard	
1911	L'Automne du cœur : Vanesco	
1911	Mariage par le cinématographe ou Un mariage par le cinéma : Harry Bull	
1911	Eugène amoureux	
1911	Titine et Totor : Totor, the plumber	
1911	Dans la vie	
1911	Monsieur Prud'homme joue la comédie : Monsieur Prud'homme	
1911	L'Âme du violon	
1911	André Chénier	
1911	Les Béquilles : Le directeur	
1911	La Cure de solitude : Louis de Beauchamp	
1911	Le Haleur : Le haleur	
1911	Le Moïse du moulin : Julien	
1912	Plus fort que la haine	
1912	Le Chrysanthème rouge : Un prétendant	
1912	La Dette d'honneur	
1912	Marget et Benedict	
1912	Mystère des roches de Kador : Comte Fernand de Kéranic	
1912	Nanine, femme d'artiste : Pierre Voisel	
1912	Le Mariage de minuit	
1912	Main de fer contre la bande aux gants blancs : Le baron de Croze	
1912	Main de fer : Rizzio the spy and le duc de Loze	
1912	L'Express matrimonial : Gontran	
1912	Un nuage	
1912	Léonce fait des gaffes : Léonce	
1912	Graziella la gitane : André Darnel	
1912	La Lumière et l'Amour : Roger Darbois	
1912	L'Espalier de la marquise : Le marquis Roger de Cérigny	
1912	Un coq en pâte : Baron de Barsac	
1912	La Rançon du bonheur : Lieutenant Jacques Mareuil	
1913	Léonce voyage	
1913	Léonce et la bouillotte	
1913	Léonce à la campagne	
1913	Main de fer et l'évasion du forçat de Croze : Le forçat de Croze	
1913	Léonce en voyage de noces	
1913	Léonce en ménage	
1913	Les Épingles : Léonce	
1913	Un cœur de poupée : Léonce	
1913	Léonce et les écrevisses	
1913	Léonce flirte	
1913	Léonce veut divorcer	
1913	Léonce pot-au-feu	
1913	Léonce célibataire	
1913	Léonce fait du reportage	
1913	Léonce et Toto	
1913	Léonce veut maigrir	
1913	Léonce et sa tante	
1913	Léonce et son conseil judiciaire	
1913	Léonce papillonne	
1913	Léonce et Poupette	
1913	L'Apollon des roches noires	
1913	Le Homard : Léonce	
1913	L'Enfant de Paris : Léonce	
1913	Les Bretelles : Léonce	
1913	Léonce cinématographiste	
1913	Le Collier de Nini Pinson : Ferryboat	
1913	Les Fiancés de l'air : Jacques Mareuil	
1913	La Belle-mère de Léonce	
1913	Léonce aime les morilles	
1913	Léonce au château d'If	
1913	L'Ange de la maison : Léonce	
1913	Léonce a des rhumatismes	
1914	Léonce n'est pas frileux	
1914	Léonce aux bains de mer	
1914	Léonce et les poissons rouges	
1914	Léonce a le mal de mer	
1914	Léonce a le mal d'amour	
1914	Léonce aime les petits pieds	
1914	Léonce l'est-il?	
1914	Son excellence	
1914	Léonce veut se suicider	
1914	La Voix de la patrie : Capitaine Paul d'Airvault	
1915	Léonce et le bain du préfet	
1915	Léonce flûtiste	
1915	L'Autre devoir : Léonce	
1915	Léonce papa	
1915	Léonce jardinier	
1915	Léonce aime les Belges	
1916	Léonce s'émancipe	
1916	Léonce poète	
1916	Je le suis : Léonce	
1916	C'est pour les orphelines	
1916	Léonce en vacances	
1916	Les 2000 blondes du Père Dubreuil	
1916	Dernier amour	
