= Pathé News =

British newsreel producer (1910–1970)

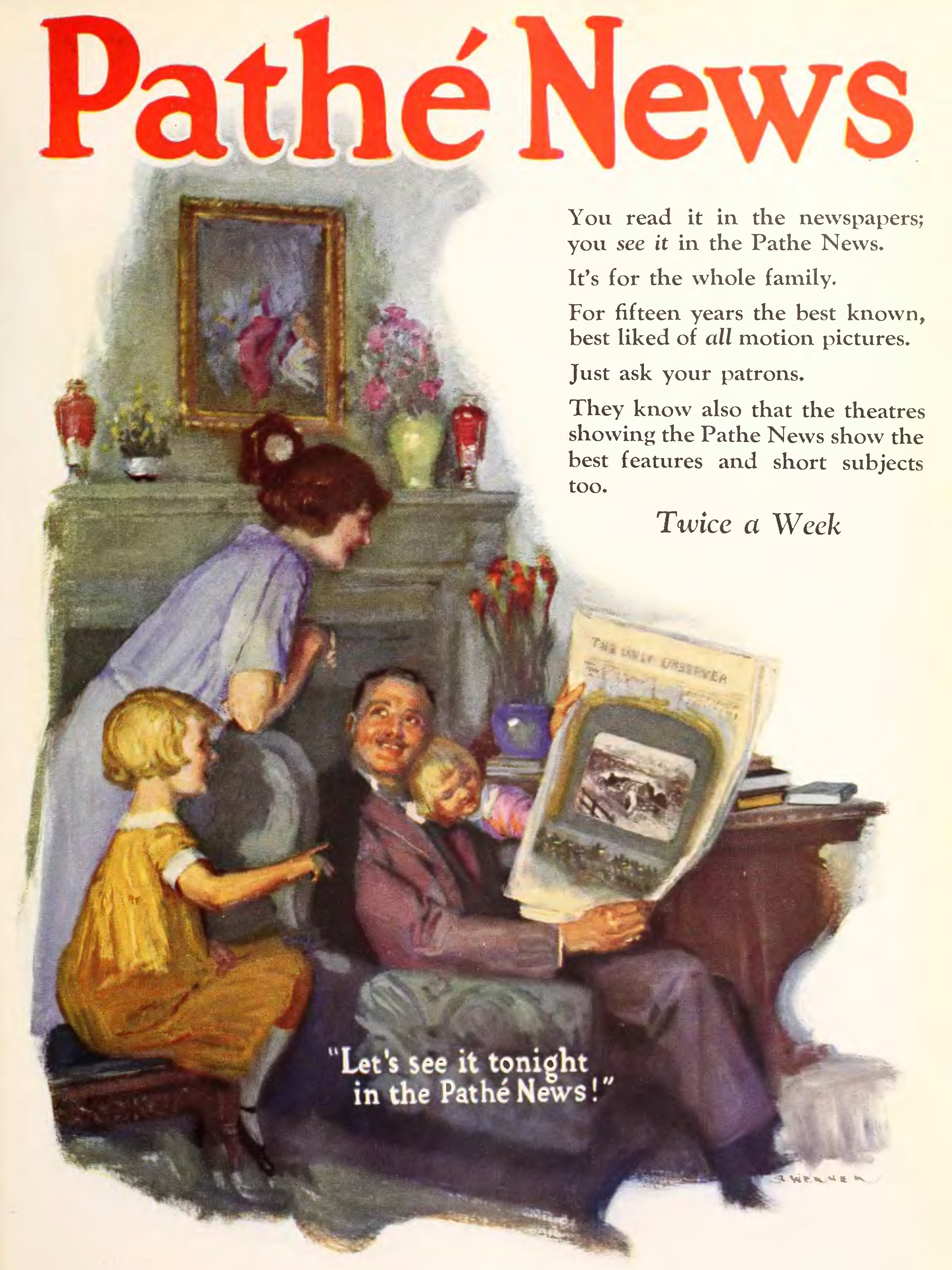
- Pathé News ad in Motion Picture News, 1926
- Industry: Newsreels and documentary production
- Founded: 1910; 116 years ago
- Founder: Charles Pathé
- Headquarters: United Kingdom
- Website: www.britishpathe.com

Pathé News (Note: /ˈpæθ.eɪ/) was a British-French producer of newsreels and documentaries from 1910 to 1970 in the United Kingdom. Its founder, Charles Pathé, was a pioneer of moving pictures in the silent era. The Pathé News archive is known today as "British Pathé". Its collection of news film and movies is fully digitised and available online.

Pathé News was a subsidiary of the French Pathé group, which today remains one of Europe's leading film industry players.

== History ==
Its roots lie in 1896 Paris, France, when Société Pathé Frères was founded by Charles Pathé and his brothers. Charles Pathé adopted the national emblem of France, the cockerel, as the trademark for his company. After the company, now called Compagnie Générale des Éstablissements Pathé Frère Phonographes & Cinématographes, invented the cinema newsreel with Pathé-Journal. French Pathé began its newsreel in 1908 and opened a newsreel office in Wardour Street, London in 1910.

The newsreels were shown in the cinema and were silent until 1928. At first, they ran for about four minutes and were issued fortnightly. During the early days, the camera shots were taken from a stationary position but the Pathé newsreels captured events such as Franz Reichelt's fatal parachute jump from the Eiffel Tower and suffragette Emily Davison's fatal injury by a racehorse at the 1913 Epsom Derby. One of their more innovative films from their silent era was "Belfast/Ulster's Great Day". The film had lots of wide shots showing crowds of people. These were lined up because the first prime minister of Northern Ireland took the podium. The film showed the prime minister speaking about the holiday where the orange order celebrates the victory of Protestant King William of Orange over Catholic King James II from the Battle of Boyne in 1960.

1931 Pathé newsreel of Mahatma Gandhi arriving in London

During the First World War, the cinema newsreels were called the Pathé Animated Gazettes, and for the first time this provided newspapers with competition. After 1918, British Pathé started producing a series of cinemazines, in which the newsreels were much longer and more comprehensive. By 1930, British Pathé was covering news, entertainment, sport, culture, and women's issues through programmes including the Pathétone Weekly, the Pathé Pictorial, the Gazette and Eve's Film Review.

In 1927, the company sold British Pathé (both the feature film and the newsreel divisions) to First National. (French Pathé News continued until 1980, and the library is now part of the Gaumont-Pathé collection.) Pathé changed hands again in 1933, when it was acquired by British International Pictures, which was later known as Associated British Picture Corporation. In 1958, it was sold again to Warner Bros. and became Warner-Pathé. Pathé eventually stopped producing the cinema newsreel in February 1970 as it could no longer compete with television. During the newsreels' run, the narrators included Bob Danvers-Walker, Dwight Weist, Dan Donaldson, André Baruch and Clem McCarthy among others.

== Digitisation ==
The library itself was sold with Associated British Picture to EMI Films and then others, including The Cannon Group (which split the feature film and newsreel divisions) and the Daily Mail and General Trust, before relaunching in its own right in 2009. The feature film division is now part of StudioCanal and is no longer connected with Pathé, the French film company and the original parent of British Pathé. In 2002, partially funded by the UK National Lottery, the entire archive was digitised. The British Pathé archive now holds over 3,500 hours of filmed history, 90,000 individual items and 12 million stills. On 7 February 2009, British Pathé launched a YouTube channel of its newsreel archive.

From March 2010, British Pathé relaunched its archive as an online entertainment site, making Pathé News a service for the public as well as the broadcasting industry. In May 2010, The Guardian was given access to the British Pathé archive, hosting topical videos on its website. In May 2012, British Pathé won the FOCAL International Award for Footage Library of the Year. In April 2014, British Pathé uploaded the entire collection of 85,000 historic films to its YouTube channel as part of a drive to make the archive more accessible to viewers all over the world. As of 2025, the British Pathé YouTube channel had 1.6 billion views and 3.54 million subscribers.

By 2020, the British Pathé archive now includes material from the Reuters historical collection. Additionally, as historically the British Pathé newsreels covered events in the island of Ireland, while it was variously part of the United Kingdom of Great Britain and Ireland, Northern Ireland, the Irish Free State, and later a Republic, that part of the archive was shared with the Irish Film Institute's Irish Film Archive, curated as The Irish Independence Film Collection. This also resulted in a more accurate cataloguing of the locations, people, and the historical context, than the UK office would have historically had.

== Television use ==
British Pathé produced a number of programmes and series as well as newsreels, such as Pathé Eve and Astra Gazette. In 2010, BBC Four reversioned the 1950s Pathé series Time To Remember, which was narrated by the actor Stanley Holloway, and broadcast it as a thematic 12-part series. BBC News continues to use extracts in its coverage of various events, such as Windrush, and World War II.

== Name changes ==
British Pathé has been known under the following names:

- C.G.P.C. (1910–1927)
- First National-Pathé (1927–1933)
- Associated British-Pathé/RKO-Pathé (1933–1958)
- Warner-Pathé (1958–1970)
- British Pathé News (1990–1995)
- British Pathé (since 1995)

== Pathé News in the United States ==
The U.S. version of Pathé News, which began in 1911 as Pathé Weekly, was no longer associated with the British version and Pathé Frères' other newsreels around the world after 1921, when Pathé Frères' American subsidiary, Pathé Exchange, was spun off as an independent business. RKO Radio Pictures acquired the twice-weekly Pathé News along with most of the rest of the Pathé Exchange assets in 1931, rebranding it RKO Pathé News. In 1947, Warner Bros. purchased the newsreel from RKO, rebranding it in turn as Warner Pathé News. Warner also produced a series of 38 theatrical short subjects and 81 issues of the News Magazine of the Screen series, which added to the Pathé film properties and were part of the company's extensive film library. Producer/editor Robert Youngson was primarily responsible for these series and won two Academy Awards for them.

In 1956, Warner Bros. discontinued the production of the theatrical newsreel and sold the Pathé News film library, the 38 theatrical short subjects, the Pathé News Magazine of the Screen, the crowing rooster trademark and the copyrights and other properties to Studio Films, Inc.—shortly thereafter named Pathé Pictures, Inc.— At this time, the new owners, Barnett Glassman, Samuel A. Costello and Joseph P. Smith acquired ownership and subsequently re-branded the name and film properties of both companies to Pathé News, Inc.

A 50% interest in the Pathé News Film Library was sold to Sherman Grinberg in 1958. The Sherman Grinberg Film Library licensed the marketing rights to the Pathé News Film Library. Pathé News, Inc retained the sole exclusive right to sell the library. The series of 38 theatrical short subjects and 81 issues of the News Magazine of the Screen series, Milestones of the Century, the Men of Destiny series, Showtime at the Apollo, as well as many other titles are marketed by Historic Films Archive, LLC.

In 2016, the children of Joseph P. Smith, acquired 100% of the stock. Today, Pathé News, Inc. is a family-owned private company.

Other U.S. newsreel series included Paramount News (1927–1957), Fox Movietone News (1928–1963), Hearst Metrotone News/News of the Day (1914–1967), Universal Newsreel (1929–1967) and The March of Time (1935–1951).

== See also ==
- Oliver G. Pike – filmmaker for British Pathé
