= Le Livre de Poche =

French book series

- Parent company: Hachette
- Founded: 1953; 73 years ago
- Country of origin: France
- Publication types: Books
- Official website: www.livredepoche.com

Le Livre de Poche (literally "The Pocket Book") is the name of a collection of publications which first appeared on 9 February 1953 under the leadership of Henri Filipacchi and published by the Librairie générale française, a subsidiary of Hachette. In terms of its influence on the mainstream book market, it shares a similar popularity in France as publishers like Penguin and Signet do in English-speaking territories.

== History ==
Admittedly, books of a similar format, fitting in a pocket, already existed. Since 1905, Editions Jules Tallandier marketed themselves under the name Livre de poche, popular novels at low cost. But the successful reception of Le Livre de Poche was due to the combination of the new idea of consumerism with the era and the popular demand for a cheap book, presented in covers recalling cinema posters, but containing quality writing.

Henri Filipacchi supposedly had the idea after seeing an American soldier tearing up a book in order to fit it into the pockets of his uniform. Filipacchi succeeded in convincing his editor friends Albin Michel, Calmann-Lévy, Grasset and Gallimard to join his project and become the "founding fathers" of Le Livre de Poche.

Thus Kœnigsmark, by Pierre Benoit, was the first title released, in 1953. Every fortnight a new title is released. It soon became a fait de société. From 8 million copies in 1957-1958, sales climbed to 28 million in 1969. This success inspired competitors: J'ai lu created by Flammarion in 1958, Presses Pocket created by the Presses de la Cité and Folio created by Gallimard in 1972 after its withdrawal from the Librairie Générale Française. But, with nearly a billion volumes distributed since its creation and more than 18 million copies sold in 2002, it remains the premier widely distributed French paperback collection.

== Some facts ==
The capital of La Librairie générale française, a limited company, is owned 80% by Hachette-Livre and, up to 20%, by les Éditions Albin Michel.

- 3,500 titles in its catalogue as of 31.12.2002
- 14,000 titles published since 1953
- 1 billion volumes distributed since its inception
- 360 new titles a year
- 1,000 reprinted titles a year
- more than 18 million copies sold in 2002
