= American Love (film) =

1931 film

- Directed by: Claude Heymann; Pál Fejös
- Written by: André Mouézy-Éon (play); Marian Spitzer (play); Robert Spitzer (play); Marc Allégret
- Produced by: Pierre Braunberger; Charles David; Roger Richebé
- Starring: Andrée Spinelly; André Luguet; Suzet Maïs
- Cinematography: Roger Hubert; Theodor Sparkuhl
- Edited by: Denise Batcheff
- Music by: Russ Goudey; Paul Misraki; Ray Ventura
- Production company: Les Établissements Braunberger-Richebé
- Distributed by: Les Établissements Braunberger-Richebé
- Release date: 26 December 1931
- Running time: 96 minutes
- Country: France
- Language: French

American Love (French: L'amour à l'américaine) is a 1931 French comedy film directed by Claude Heymann and Pál Fejös and starring Andrée Spinelly, André Luguet and Suzet Maïs. The film's sets were designed by the art director Gabriel Scognamillo.

== Plot ==
Based on a play of the same name, it portrays the romantic escapades of a young American woman in France who falls in love with a married man.

== Cast ==
- Andrée Spinelly as Maud Jennings
- André Luguet as Gilbert Latour
- Suzet Maïs as Geneviève Latour
- Pauline Carton as Pauline
- Julien Carette as Lepape
- Andrée Champeaux as Hélène, la bonne
- Véra Flory as La femme de chambre
- Isabelle Kloucowski as Ursule Lepape
- Ragson as La chanteuse
- Romain Bouquet as L'avocat
- Roger Blum as L'officier de marine
- Pierre Darteuil as Un monsieur
- Anthony Gildès as Un client
- Lucas Gridoux as Le fakir Habib Khan
- Pierre Pradier as L'entrepreneur des pombes funèbres
- Raymond Rognoni as Le beau-père
- Émile Saint-Ober as L'employé des pombes funèbres
- Pierre Larquey as Le maître d'hôtel à la barbiche
- Pierre Piérade as Un convive

== Bibliography ==
- Goble, Alan. The Complete Index to Literary Sources in Film. Walter de Gruyter, 1999.
