= Atlantida (novel) =

1919 novel by Pierre Benoit

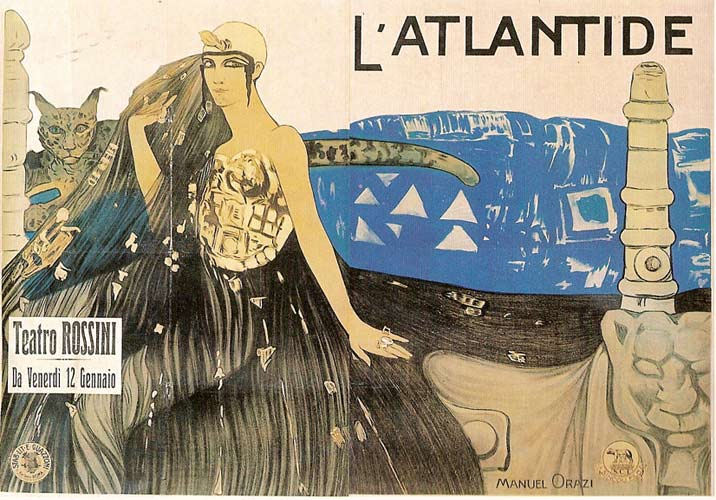
- Author: Pierre Benoit
- Original title: L'Atlantide
- Translator: Mary C. Tongue and Mary Ross
- Language: English
- Genre: Fantasy
- Publisher: Albin Michel
- Publication date: 1919
- English publication date: 1920
- Media type: Print (Hardback)
- Pages: 352

Atlantida (French: L'Atlantide) is a fantasy novel by French writer Pierre Benoit, published in February 1919. It was translated into English in 1920 as Atlantida. L'Atlantide was Benoit's second novel, following Koenigsmark, and it won the Grand Prize of the French Academy. The English translation of Atlantida was first published in the United States as a serial in Adventure magazine.

The story inspired several films.

== Plot summary ==
It is 1896 in the French Algerian Sahara. Two officers, André de Saint-Avit and Jean Morhange investigate the disappearance of their fellow officers. While doing so, they are drugged and kidnapped by a Targui warrior, the procurer for the monstrous Queen Antinea.

Antinea, descendant of the rulers of Atlantis, has a cave wall with 120 niches carved into it, one for each of her lovers. Only 53 have been filled; when all 120 have been filled, Antinea will sit atop a throne in the center of the cave and rest forever. Saint-Avit is unable to resist Antinea's charms. By her will, he murders the asexual Morhange. Ultimately, he is able to escape and get out of the desert alive.

== Inspiration ==
According to some, Benoit's character Antinea was inspired by the Berber queen Tin Hinan.

In the book Pierre Benoit also draws upon the memories of his youth. As the son of a colonel, he spent his early years in Tunisia, where his father was posted, and then attended school in Algeria,where he also fulfilled his military service. In an article in L'Écho de Paris dated 2 February 1920, Pierre Benoit explained:

From 1892 to 1907, I lived in Tunisia and in Algeria. Ever since my childhood, I had heard talk of Tuaregs, and my imagination was aroused by certain sombre stories, especially that of a mission into the African centre by two Frenchmen of whom only one returned, without anyone ever learning how his companion had perished. This is the idea which is at the basis of Atlantida, there is no other."

This statement followed an allegation by reviewer Henry Magden in October 1919 that Benoit had plagiarised Sir Henry Rider Haggard's novel She (1887); in the ensuing lawsuit for libel, Benoit stated this to be untrue as he could neither speak nor read English. Indeed, no French translation of Haggard's book had been available at the time.

== Film adaptations ==
The first film adaptation of L'Atlantide was made during 1920 (and released in 1921), directed by Jacques Feyder.

During 1932–1933, famed German film director Georg Wilhelm Pabst made three films based on the novel, one each in German, French and English, as was common in the early to mid-1930s. They were titled Die Herrin von Atlantis, L'Atlantide and The Mistress of Atlantis respectively.

An American film version of the story was released in 1949 under the title Siren of Atlantis, starring María Montez.

The Italian-made peplum film Hercules and the Conquest of Atlantis (Ercole alla conquista di Atlantide, 1961), directed by Vittorio Cottafavi, drew heavily on the plot and characters of the book, having Queen Antinea capture Hercules and his companion Androcles, and imprisoning them in her red-lined underground palace. Androcles takes the Saint-Avit role and tries to murder Hercules, who (unsurprisingly) is able to resist Antinea's wiles and eventually saves the day. The film incorporates an anti-nuclear theme and has been praised by critics as one of the better peplum ("Sword-and-sandal") films. However its alternative US title – Hercules and the Captive Women – makes clear the audience it was expected to attract. Another Italian film, the comedy Totò sceicco (1950) starring Totò, is a parody of the story (and in particular of the 1949 film Siren of Atlantis).

A European co-production, Journey Beneath the Desert also filmed in 1961 was directed by Edgar G. Ulmer who replaced an ailing Frank Borzage.

A 1972 French television film L'Atlantide was directed by Jean Kerchbron.

In 1992, another film adaptation of the novel was made, L'Atlantide, directed by Bob Swaim and starring Tchéky Karyo, Jean Rochefort, Anna Galiena, and the famous Spanish actor, Fernando Rey.

== Video game adaptation ==
In 1997, Cryo Interactive released Atlantis: The Lost Tales. The game draws heavily and intentionally from Benoit's L'Atlantide while updating the story and concepts for a contemporary audience. Queen Antinea is reimagined as Queen Rhea, the ruling monarch of Atlantis in its last days. The game was a massive hit in Europe, leading to four sequels that largely ignore Benoit's source material.

== See also ==
- List of films made in Weimar Germany
