= The Twin Pawns =

1919 film directed by Léonce Perret

- Directed by: Léonce Perret
- Written by: Léonce Perret
- Based on: The Woman in White by Wilkie Collins
- Produced by: Léonce Perret
- Starring: Mae Murray; Warner Oland
- Cinematography: Alfred Ortlieb; Harry D. Harde
- Distributed by: Pathé Exchange
- Release date: March 18, 1919
- Running time: 5 reels
- Country: United States
- Language: Silent (English intertitles)

The Twin Pawns is a 1919 American silent drama film directed by Léonce Perret and starring Mae Murray. It is yet another film taken from Wilkie Collins' novel The Woman in White. The film was released by Pathé Exchange.

== Cast ==
- Mae Murray as Daisy, Violet White
- Warner Oland as John Bent
- Jack W. Johnston as Harry White (credited as J. W. Johnston)
- Henry G. Sell as Bo Anderson
- Edythe Chapman (uncredited)

== Preservation status ==
The film

Copies of The Twin Pawns are held at BFI National Film Institute and Filmmuseum Amsterdam.

== See also ==
- Léonce Perret filmography (director)
- Léonce Perret filmography (actor)
