= Claude Heymann =

French screenwriter and film director (1907–1994)

- Born: 13 November 1907; Paris, France
- Died: 13 April 1994 (aged 86); Paris, France
- Occupations: Writer, Director
- Years active: 1928-1988 (film)

Claude Heymann (13 November 1907 – 13 April 1994) was a French screenwriter and film director.

== Selected filmography ==
- American Love (1931)
- Idylle au Caire (1933)
- Disk 413 (1936)
- The Brighton Twins (1936)
- Widow's Island (1937)
- Paris-New York (1940)
- Jericho (1946)
- Counter Investigation (1947)
- Crossroads of Passion (1948)
- Victor (1951)
- The Beautiful Image (1951)
- Farewell Paris (1952)
- Darling Anatole (1954)

== Bibliography ==
- Frey, Hugo. Louis Malle. Manchester University Press, 2004.
