= The Lebanese Mission =

1956 film by Richard Pottier

- Italian poster
- Directed by: Richard Pottier
- Written by: Maurice Aubergé
- Based on: The Lady of Lebanon by Pierre Benoit
- Produced by: Cino Del Duca; Pierre Gillet; Josette Trachsler
- Starring: Jean-Claude Pascal; Gianna Maria Canale; Jean Servais
- Cinematography: Lucien Joulin
- Edited by: Léonide Azar
- Music by: Paul Misraki
- Production companies: C.T.I. Cino del Duca; Jeannic Films
- Distributed by: Jeannic Films
- Release date: 12 September 1956
- Running time: 105 minutes
- Countries: France; Italy

The Lebanese Mission or The Lady of Lebanon (French: La Châtelaine du Liban) is a 1956 French-Italian Eastmancolor adventure thriller film directed by Richard Pottier and starring Jean-Claude Pascal, Gianna Maria Canale, Jean Servais and Luciana Paluzzi. Omar Sharif also appeared in one of his earlier film roles. It is an adaptation of the 1924 novel The Lady of Lebanon by Pierre Benoit. The film's sets were designed by the art director Rino Mondellini. Location shooting took place around Le Grau-du-Roi.

== Synopsis ==
The film starts with two scientists launching an expedition exploring for uranium out in the Arabian Desert, but they soon find themselves entangled in a web of espionage.

== Cast ==
- Jean-Claude Pascal as Jean Domèvre
- Gianna Maria Canale as Comtesse Athelstane Orloff
- Jean Servais as Maj. Charles Hobson
- Luciana Paluzzi as Michèle Hennequin
- Guido Celano as M. Hennequin
- Robert Dalban as Malek
- Jess Hahn as Le valet
- Guy Henry as Le géant
- Jean Lefebvre as La Pie
- Nana Aslanoglu as La danseuse
- Omar Sharif as Mokrir
- Juliette Gréco as Maroussia
- Germaine Delbat as La secrétaire
- Pierre Moncorbier as Le radio

== See also ==
- The Lady of Lebanon, a 1926 film based on the same novel
- The Lady of Lebanon, a 1934 film based on the same novel
