= The Environs of Aden =

1940 novel

- Author: Pierre Benoit
- Language: French
- Genre: Adventure
- Publisher: Éditions Albin Michel
- Publication date: 27 March 1940
- Publication place: France
- Media type: Print
- Pages: 316

The Environs of Aden (French: Les Environs d'Aden) is a 1940 adventure novel by the French writer Pierre Benoit.

== Film adaptation ==
In 1956 it was turned into a film It Happened in Aden starring Dany Robin and Jacques Dacqmine.

== Bibliography ==
- Goble, Alan. The Complete Index to Literary Sources in Film. Walter de Gruyter, 1999.
- Engler, Winfried. The French Novel, from Eighteen Hundred to the Present. Ungar, 1969.
