= Moscow Nights (1934 film) =

1934 film

- Directed by: Alexis Granowsky
- Written by: Henry Koster; Jacques Natanson
- Based on: Moscow Nights by Pierre Benoît
- Starring: Annabella; Harry Baur; Pierre Richard-Willm
- Cinematography: Franz Planer
- Edited by: Jacques Saint-Léonard
- Music by: Walter Jurmann; Bronislau Kaper
- Production company: GG Films
- Distributed by: SEDIF
- Release date: 21 November 1934
- Running time: 95 minutes
- Country: France
- Language: French

Moscow Nights (French: Les nuits moscovites) is a 1934 French war drama film directed by Alexis Granowsky and starring Annabella, Harry Baur and Pierre Richard-Willm. It is based on a story by Pierre Benoît. The film's sets were designed by the art director Andrej Andrejew. It marked the screen debut of the Corsican singer Tino Rossi, who went on to star in a number of films.

The following year, a separate British version, Moscow Nights, was produced by London Films and directed by Anthony Asquith. The only actor to appear in both films was Harry Baur.

== Synopsis ==
In Moscow during the First World War, the attractive Natacha Kovrine agrees to marry a wealthy grain merchant under pressure from her mother. However, while working as a nurse in a hospital she meets the wounded Captain Ignatoff and falls in love with him. When he is arrested and falsely accused of treason, it appears that the only man who might be able to save him is her fiancée.

== Cast ==
- Annabella as Natacha Kovrine
- Harry Baur as Piotr Brioukow
- Pierre Richard-Willm as Le capitaine Ignatoff
- Germaine Dermoz as Madame Kovrine
- Roger Karl as Le colonel Kovrine
- Andrée Spinelly as Anna Sabline
- Ernest Ferny as Le capitaine Polonsky
- Jean Toulout as Le chef d'état-major
- Paul Escoffier as Le général Molochof
- Paul Amiot as Le président de la cour martiale
- Tino Rossi as Le chanteur napolitain
- Mario Podesta as Le tzigane
- Daniel Mendaille as Un diplomate
- Youcca Troubetzkov as Le capitaine Alev
- Edmond Van Daële as Le mendiant
- Robert Seller as Fédor

== Bibliography ==
- Oscherwitz, Dayna & Higgins, MaryEllen. The A to Z of French Cinema. Scarecrow Press, 2009.
