= Journey Beneath the Desert =

- Directed by: Giuseppe Masini; Edgar G. Ulmer; Frank Borzage
- Screenplay by: Remigio Del Grosso; Ugo Liberatore; Andre Tabet
- Based on: L'Atlantide by Pierre Benoit
- Produced by: Luigi Nannerini
- Starring: Haya Harareet; Jean-Louis Trintignant; Georges Rivière; Rad Fulton
- Cinematography: Enzo Serafin
- Edited by: Renato Cinquini
- Music by: Carlo Rustichelli
- Release dates: 5 May 1961 (Italy); 28 June 1961 (France)
- Running time: 105 minutes
- Countries: Italy; France

Journey Beneath the Desert (Italian: Antinea, l'amante della città sepolta) is a 1961 adventure film based on the novel Atlantida by Pierre Benoit.

== Cast ==
- Jean-Louis Trintignant – Pierre
- Haya Harareet – Queen Antinea
- Georges Rivière – John
- James Westmoreland (as Rad Fulton) – Robert
- Amedeo Nazzari – Tamal
- Gian Maria Volonté – Tarath
- Giulia Rubini – Zinah
- Gabriele Tinti – Max
- Ignazio Dolce

== Production ==
Frank Borzage was slated to direct the film and began production but left due to an illness and was replaced by Edgar G. Ulmer.

== Release ==
Journey Beneath the Desert was released in Italy on 5 May 1961. It was released in France on 28 June 1961.

== Footnotes ==
=== References ===
- Kinnard, Roy; Crnkovich, Tony (2017). Italian Sword and Sandal Films, 1908–1990. McFarland. ISBN 978-1476662916.
