= The Gobi Desert (novel) =

1941 novel by Joseph Kessel

- Author: Pierre Benoit
- Language: French
- Genre: Adventure
- Publisher: Éditions Albin Michel
- Publication date: 1941
- Publication place: France
- Media type: Print
- Pages: 318

The Gobi Desert (French: Le Désert de Gobi) is a 1941 adventure novel by the French writer Pierre Benoit.

== Plot ==
Set in 1928, the plot revolves around two Russian biologists who travel to the Gobi Desert in search of a rare animal, that they are planning to protect from a fascist politician who was overthrown, who plans on sending it to the biggest animal smuggling ring in European history.

== Bibliography ==
- Pierre de Boisdeffre. Une histoire vivante de la littérature d'aujourd'hui, 1939-1960. Le Livre Contemporain, 1960.
