= L'Atlantide (1992 film) =

- French poster
- Directed by: Bob Swaim
- Based on: Atlantida by Pierre Benoit
- Produced by: Roberto Cicutto
- Cinematography: Ennio Guarnieri
- Edited by: Marie-Sophie Dubus
- Music by: Richard Horowitz
- Production company: Gaumont
- Distributed by: Gaumont Distribution
- Release date: 30 December 1992
- Running time: 110 minutes
- Countries: France; Italy
- Language: French

L'Atlantide is a 1992 French-Italian adventure film directed by Bob Swaim and starring Tchéky Karyo, Christopher Thompson and Jean Rochefort. It tells the story of a former soldier who searches for a man who has disappeared, and comes into contact with a mysterious and attractive queen from an ancient dynasty. It is based on Pierre Benoit's 1919 novel Atlantida, which had been adapted for film several times before. The film premiered in France on 30 December 1992.

== Cast ==
- Tchéky Karyo as Lieutenant Morhange
- Christopher Thompson as St. Avit
- Victoria Mahoney as Antinea
- Anna Galiena as Amira
- Jean Rochefort as Le Meige
- Günther Maria Halmer as Bielowsky
- Orso Maria Guerrini as Ben Cheikh
- Patrice-Flora Praxo as Tanit
- Michele Melega as Ferriere
- Claudia Gerini as Sophie
- Antonio Marsina as Nirval
- Fernando Rey as Père Mauritius
