= Andrée Spinelly =

French actress (1887–1966)

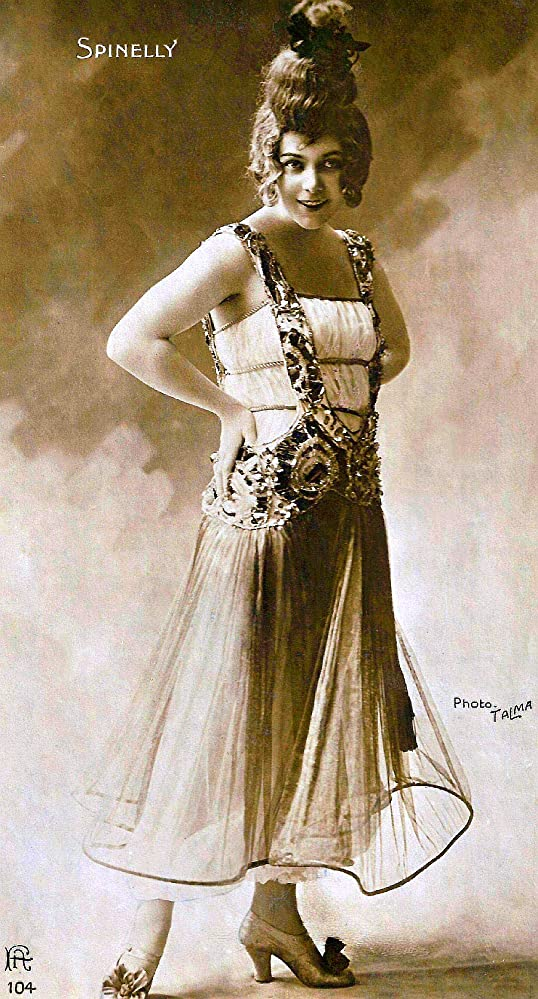
- Born: 1 May 1887; Paris, France
- Died: 25 July 1966 (aged 79); Bidart, Pyrénées-Atlantiques, France
- Occupation: Actress
- Writing career
- Years active: 1917–1949 (film)

Andrée Spinelly (1887–1966), often known simply as Spinelly, was a French stage actress. She also appeared in several films. She emerged as a major music hall star in Paris, as well as touring in London and New York.

== Selected filmography ==
- Spinelly cherche un mari (1917)
- American Love (1931)
- Idylle au Caire (1933)
- The Lady of Lebanon (1934)
- Moscow Nights (1934)
- Boissière (1937)
- Suzanne and the Robbers (1949)

== Bibliography ==
- Merrill, Jane. The Showgirl Costume: An Illustrated History. McFarland, 2018.
- Roust, Colin. Georges Auric: A Life in Music and Politics. Oxford University Press, 2020.
