= The Heart and the Money =

1912 film directed by Louis Feuillade and Léonce Perret

Full film

The Heart and the Money (French: Le Cœur et l'Argent) is a 1912 film directed by Louis Feuillade and Léonce Perret.

Early filmmaker Louis Feuillade's most well known works focus on crime serials. When Feuillade and Léonce Perret decided to work together, Perret introduced his co-director to a new style of filming. Visually, The Heart and the Money presents a different aesthetic, such as shooting on location, to the time period. The techniques the directors used, such as on-location shooting, split screens, and sense of storytelling, were employed way before their time to portray a gripping and saddening melodrama.

== About the film ==
Feuillade directed over 800 films throughout his career. However, what makes this film stand out in his collection, besides the fact that it is a melodrama, is the decision with Perret to tackle on-location shooting. Through this stylistic choice, audiences are able to compare and contrast and see characters in a different light, both figuratively and literally. For instance, Suzanne is initially seen with Raymond out on a sunny day, enjoying a casual boat ride in the river. She appears happy and free until her mother comes along to whisk her away. When Suzanne is introduced to Monsieur Vernier with a blank look upon her face, they are inside the family hotel which is an enclosed space. The choice to shoot on location holds much value to the underlying conflict of the story because it shows the dichotomy between rich and poor. Raymond appears to be a typical, average guy, but in comparison to Monsieur Vernier's lavish life of having a driver and owning a mansion, Raymond is poor. Raymond's scenes are all shot out on location in open spaces; he has little to show for what he has and what he is worth. Monsieur Vernier is surrounded by his materialistic value especially when he, Suzanne, and her mother arrive to his mansion. Unlike Raymond, he has more than his attitude and clean clothes to show his wealth.

The use of split screen was rare and new to the field of movies at the time. Its use in this film hold a great deal of weight by conveying the feelings of the characters. Audiences see Suzanne in her new mansion after marrying the wealthy Monsieur Vernier. Suzanne is admiring a vase of flowers like the flowers her true love Raymond once gave her. The shot is then followed by a split screen of her sitting with a look of sadness on her face and a shot of her and Raymond enjoying a romantic afternoon out on a boat in the river. As the film goes from her admiration of the flowers that hold a significant meaning to the split screen, audiences are able to infer that she realizes she made a mistake by marrying Monsieur Vernier. Another application of the split screen is used with Raymond as he sits out on the river in his boat with Suzanne in his arms, and he recalls special memories the two shared before she married Monsieur Vernier. Their recollection of each other is presented in a manner that each is in contact with a special memory that link the two together. This technique of the split screen was rarely used in the early twentieth century; it did not become heavily utilized until the 1960s.

The final, but not last, aspect of the film that sets it apart from other films of its time is the ending. Viewers witness Suzanne drown herself in the river after Raymond refuses to take her back into his life. In Feuillade's other films, they primarily end on a high note of either capturing the bad guy or having a couple close out the film on a happy ending. This was a bold choice of the directors to take the road less traveled and experiment with a more melodramatic approach.
