= It Happened in Aden =

- Directed by: Michel Boisrond
- Written by: Jean Aurel; Michel Boisrond; Constance Colline; Jacques Emmanuel
- Based on: The Environs of Aden by Pierre Benoît
- Produced by: Simon Barstoff
- Starring: André Luguet; Jacques Dacqmine; Dany Robin
- Cinematography: Marcel Grignon
- Edited by: Claudine Bouché
- Music by: Georges Van Parys
- Production company: S.B. Films
- Distributed by: Cocinor
- Release date: 22 August 1956
- Running time: 88 minutes
- Country: France
- Language: French

It Happened in Aden (French: C'est arrivé à Aden...) is a 1956 French historical comedy film directed by Michel Boisrond and starring André Luguet, Jacques Dacqmine and Dany Robin. It is based on the 1940 novel The Environs of Aden by Pierre Benoît.

The film's sets were designed by the art director René Moulaert.

== Synopsis ==
In the late nineteenth century, a French theatrical troupe become stranded in the British colony of Aden where the officers of the garrison woo the leading stars. One of them, Albine, attracts the interest of a local Prince there to sign a treaty with the British, leading to his kidnapping her.

== Cast ==
- André Luguet as Sir Richard Wilkinson – le gouverneur d'Aden
- Jacques Dacqmine as Le major Burton
- Dany Robin as Albine
- Robert Manuel as Zafarana
- Elina Labourdette as Simone
- Edmond Ardisson as Le patron
- Jean Bretonnière as Prince de Khamarkar
- Geneviève Brunet as Margaret
- Georges Chamarat as Le capitaine du navire
- Maurice Dorléac
- Jacques Duby as Gremilly
- Michel Etcheverry as Le pasteur Sanderman
- Jacques Ferrière as Joyce
- Madeleine Ganne
- Clément Harari as Abdullah
- Charles Lemontier
- Michael Lonsdale as Sinclair
- Odile Mallet as Elizabeth
- Jacques Morlaine
- Dominique Page as Lucette
- Laure Paillette
- Robert Pizani as Hubert Robert
- Claude Rich as Price
- Roger Saget as Clairville
- Bachir Touré as Ali
- André Versini as Lusignan

== Bibliography ==
- Hayward, Susan. French Costume Drama of the 1950s: Fashioning Politics in Film. Intellect Books, 2010.
