= Suzanne Grandais =

French actress (1893–1920)

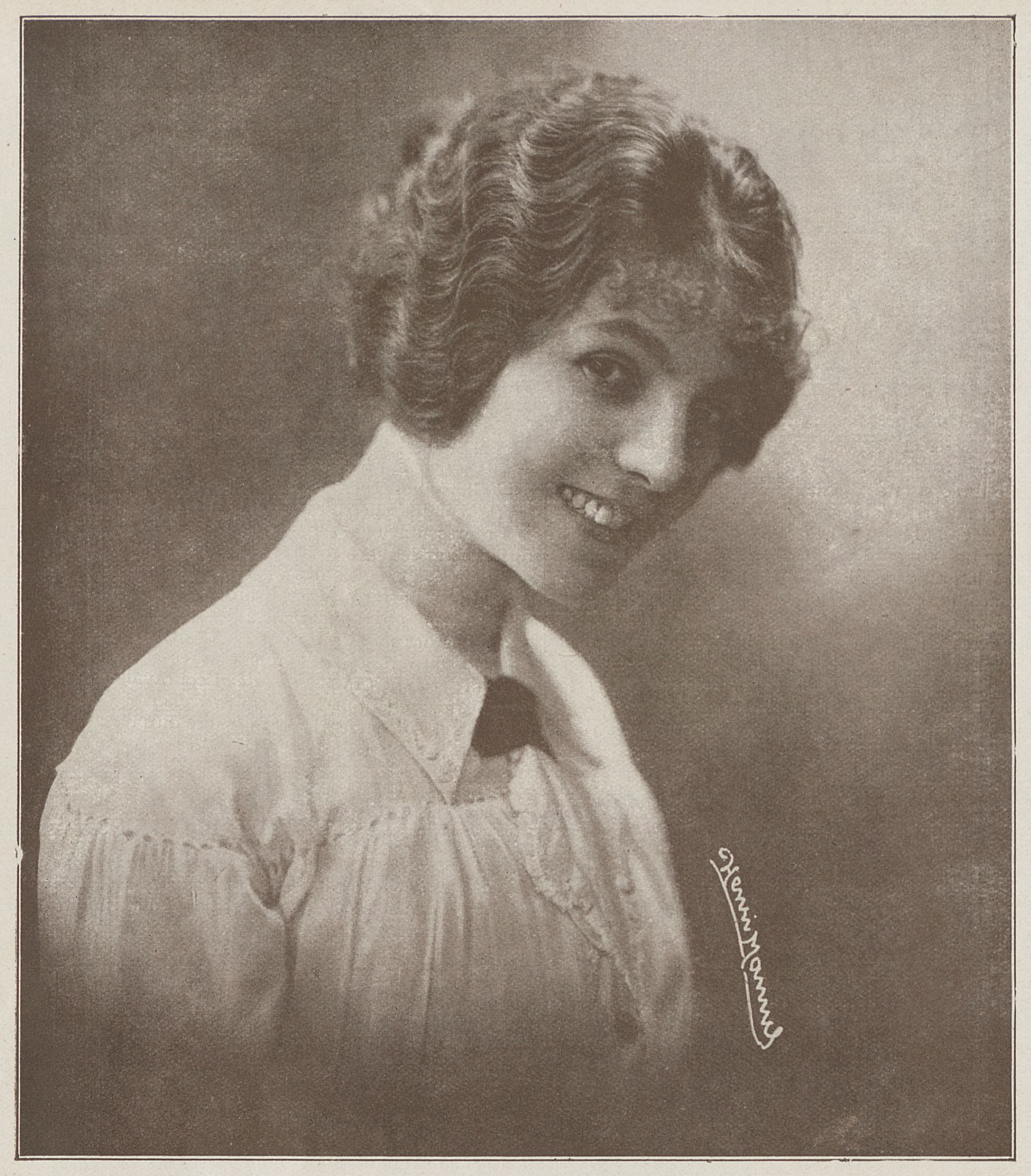
- Grandais in 1920
- Born: Suzanne Gueudret; June 14, 1893; City of Paris
- Died: August 28, 1920 (aged 27); Vaudoy-en-Brie Department de Seine-et Marne Ile-de-France, France
- Resting place: Cimetiere St. Vincent, Montmartre
- Occupation: Actress
- Years active: 1910–1920

Suzanne Grandais (June 14, 1893 – August 28, 1920) was a French film actress popular during the World War I years. She was called "The Mary Pickford of France" because of her resemblance to the American superstar Mary Pickford. She was also compared to American serial queen Pearl White. She worked often with directors Léonce Perret and Louis Feuillade. Grandais was killed in a car crash in August 1920 while shooting scenes for a serial.

== Partial filmography ==
- Olga, the Adventuress (1912) short
- The Ransom of Happiness (1912) short
- The Mystery of the Kador Cliffs (1912)
- Le Noel de Francesca (1912) short
- A Lesson in Love (1912) short
- Un nuage (1912) short
- Le pont sur l'abime (1912)
- La fin d'une revolution americaine (1912)
- Les audaces de coeur (1913) short
- Leonce en voyage de noces (1913) short
- La dentelliere (1913) short
- L'Apollon des roches noires (1913) short
- Tragic Error (1913) short
- Suzanne et les brigands (1920)
- Gosse de riche (1920)
- L'essor (1921)
