= Idylle au Caire =

1933 film

- Directed by: Reinhold Schünzel; Claude Heymann
- Written by: Jacques Bousquet; Walter Reisch
- Produced by: Raoul Ploquin
- Starring: Renate Müller; George Rigaud; Henry Roussel
- Cinematography: Carl Hoffmann
- Edited by: Eduard von Borsody
- Music by: Werner R. Heymann
- Production company: UFA
- Distributed by: L'Alliance Cinématographique Européenne
- Release date: 30 June 1933
- Running time: 80 minutes
- Countries: France; Germany
- Language: French

Idylle au Caire is a 1933 French-language comedy film directed by Claude Heymann and Reinhold Schünzel and starring Renate Müller, George Rigaud and Henry Roussel. It was an alternate language version of the film Season in Cairo made by UFA. It was shot at the Babelsberg Studios and on location in Egypt. The film's sets were designed by the art directors Robert Herlth and Walter Röhrig.

== Synopsis ==
While visiting Cairo Tobby Blackwell and Stéphy plan to set up their widowed parents as a couple. Instead they find themselves having to marry each other.

== Cast ==
- Renate Müller as Stéphy
- George Rigaud as Tobby Blackwell
- Henry Roussel as Le comte Léopold de Weidling-Weidling
- Andrée Spinelly as Mabel Blackwell
- Youcca Troubetzkov as Périclès Pietro Cochino
- Jakob Tiedtke as Ismaël Pacha
- Théo Tony as Le directeur de l'hôtel
- Robert Négrel as Le speaker
- Angelo Ferrari as Un gigolo
- Étienne Denois as Un gigolo

== Bibliography ==
- Bock, Hans-Michael; Bergfelder, Tim, eds. (2009). The Concise Cinegraph: Encyclopaedia of German Cinema. New York: Berghahn Books. ISBN 978-1-57181-655-9.
