= The Lady of Lebanon (1926 film) =

1926 film

- Directed by: Marco de Gastyne
- Based on: The Lady of Lebanon by Pierre Benoît
- Produced by: Bernard Natan
- Starring: Arlette Marchal; Iván Petrovich; Gaston Modot
- Production company: Pathé-Natan
- Distributed by: Pathé-Natan
- Release date: 29 September 1926
- Country: France
- Languages: Silent; French intertitles

The Lady of Lebanon (French: La châtelaine du Liban) is a 1926 French silent drama film directed by Marco de Gastyne and starring Arlette Marchal, Iván Petrovich and Gaston Modot. It was based on the 1924 novel of the same name by Pierre Benoît.

== Cast ==
- Arlette Marchal as Countess Orloff
- Iván Petrovich as Captain Lucien Domèvre
- Gaston Modot as Ahmed Said
- Marcel Soarez as Captain Walter
- Choura Milena as Michelle Hannequin
- Nathalie Greuze
- Henri Étiévant as Colonel Hannequin
- Georges Paulais
- Maurice Salvany
- Mitchell
- Camille Bert as Colonel Prieur
- Max Dejean

== See also ==
- The Lady of Lebanon, a 1934 film based on the same novel
- The Lebanese Mission, a 1956 film based on the same novel

== Bibliography ==
- Dayna Oscherwitz & MaryEllen Higgins. The A to Z of French Cinema. Scarecrow Press, 2009.
