= Pierre Pradier =

French pianist (born 1948)

Pierre Pradier (born 26 July 1948) is a French classical pianist.

== Biography ==
Born in La Seyne-sur-Mer, Pradier won the grand prix of the city of Marseille in Pierre Barbizet's class, in conjunction with law studies at the Faculty of Aix-en-Provence. He entered the Conservatoire de Paris where he won the 4 first prizes including one for the piano in Monique de la Bruchollerie's class. Various encounters then with Pierre Bernac, Henri Sauguet, and Vladimir Jankélévitch influenced him a lot, as well as the advice of Gyorgy Cziffra and Emil Gilels. Laureate of the International Casella Competition in Naples, and winner of the Alex de Vriès prize of the Long-Thibaud-Crespin Competition, he performed in Europe and the United States, and recorded several discs devoted to Chopin, Liszt and Rachmaninoff. He also participated in the recording of film music, notably René Allio's, and television programs including Le Grand Échiquier devoted to Gyorgy Cziffra. Pradier also accompanies singers such as Claude Dormoy and Michel Dens. In addition, Pradier has collaborated on several ballet creations by Roland Petit, such as Parisiana 25, Les amours de Franz, Soirées Debussy n°2, Ma Pavlova, Charlot danse avec nous, as guest solo pianist with Dominique Khalfouni, Zizi Jeanmaire, Maya Plisetskaya, Patrick Dupond, Mikhail Baryshnikov.

Pradier is an Academic of the Conservatoire de Marseille. Several students in his class have joined the Conservatoires nationaux supérieurs of Paris and Lyon, and the Brussels and Geneva conservatories.

== Discography (selection) ==
- Pierre Pradier joue Chopin, Syrinx, 1977.
- Liszt, De Vienne à Bayreuth, coffret 4 disques Lyrinx, 1978-79-80.
- 11 Préludes de Rachmaninoff, Studio 35, 1984.
