= The Lady of Lebanon (1934 film) =

- Directed by: Jean Epstein
- Written by: Jean Epstein; Pierre Benoit
- Based on: The Lady of Lebanon by Pierre Benoit
- Produced by: Marcel Vandal; Charles Delac
- Starring: Andrée Spinelly; Jean Murat
- Cinematography: Armand Thirard
- Edited by: Marthe Bassi
- Music by: Alexandre Tansman; Walter Winnig
- Production company: Vandal et Delac
- Distributed by: Pathé Consortium Cinéma
- Release date: 2 February 1934
- Running time: 96 minutes
- Country: France
- Language: French

The Lady of Lebanon (French: La Châtelaine du Liban) is a 1934 French thriller film directed by Jean Epstein, starring Andrée Spinelly and Jean Murat. The narrative is set in Lebanon and follows a web of espionage with clashes between the French and British secret services, with a beautiful young woman at the centre. The film is based on the 1924 novel The Lady of Lebanon by Pierre Benoit. Filming took place between July and December 1933 in Lebanon, France, Egypt, Palestine and Syria. It premiered on 2 February 1934.

The film's sets were designed by the art directors Lucien Aguettand and Claude Bouxin.

== Cast ==
- Jean Murat as captain Domèvre
- Andrée Spinelly as Athelstane, countess Orloff
- Gaby Basset as Maroussia
- Albert Decoeur as the general
- Marguerite Templey as the general's wife
- George Grossmith Jr. as colonel Hobson
- Ernest Ferny as captain Walter
- André Marnay as colonel Hennequin
- Georges Prieur as colonel Maret
- Georgé as Gardafuy
- Acho Chakatouny as Djoun
- Michèle Verly as Michelle

== See also ==
- The Lady of Lebanon, a 1926 film based on the same novel
- The Lebanese Mission, a 1956 film based on the same novel

== Bibliography ==
- Dayna Oscherwitz & MaryEllen Higgins. The A to Z of French Cinema. Scarecrow Press, 2009.
