= The Lady of Lebanon (novel) =

1924 novel

- 1954 edition
- Author: Pierre Benoit
- Language: French
- Genre: Thriller
- Publisher: Éditions Albin Michel
- Publication date: 1924
- Publication place: France
- Media type: Print
- Pages: 350

The Lady of Lebanon (French: La Châtelaine du Liban) is a 1924 thriller novel by the French writer Pierre Benoit.

== Film adaptations ==
The novel has been made into films on three occasions.

- The Lady of Lebanon, a 1926 silent film directed by Marco de Gastyne
- The Lady of Lebanon, a 1934 film directed by Jean Epstein
- The Lebanese Mission, a 1956 film directed by Richard Pottier

== Bibliography ==
- Bell, P.M.H. France and Britain, 1900-1940: Entente and Estrangement. Routledge, 2014.
- Goble, Alan. The Complete Index to Literary Sources in Film. Walter de Gruyter, 1999.
- Zeldin, Theodore. A History of French Passions 1848-1945, Volume 2. Clarendon Press, 1993.
