= Koenigsmark (1953 film) =

1953 French film by Solange Térac

- Directed by: Solange Térac
- Written by: Pierre Benoît (novel); Solange Térac
- Produced by: Jean-Pierre Frogerais
- Starring: Jean-Pierre Aumont; Silvana Pampanini; Renée Faure
- Cinematography: Pierre Petit
- Edited by: Andrée Feix
- Music by: Marius Constant
- Production companies: Productions Sigma; Excelsa Film
- Distributed by: Les Films Vog; Minerva Film
- Release date: 4 April 1953
- Running time: 90 minutes
- Countries: France; Italy
- Language: French

Koenigsmark is a 1953 French-Italian drama film directed by Solange Térac and starring Jean-Pierre Aumont, Silvana Pampanini and Renée Faure. It is an adaptation of Pierre Benoît's 1918 novel of the same title. The film's sets were designed by the art director Robert Dumesnil.

== Cast ==
- Jean-Pierre Aumont as Raoul Vignerte
- Silvana Pampanini as Aurore de Lautenberg
- Renée Faure as Mélusine de Graffendried
- Louis Seigner as Cyrus Beck
- Roldano Lupi as Frédéric de Lautenberg
- René Sauvaire as Capitaine Hagen
- Richard Flagey
- Jean-Michel Rankovitch as Un jeune prince
- Philippe Richard
- Albert Duvaleix

== Bibliography ==
- Hayward, Susan. French Costume Drama of the 1950s: Fashioning Politics in Film. Intellect Books, 2010.
