= Koenigsmark (novel) =

1918 novel by Pierre Benoît

Koenigsmark (French: Kœnigsmark) is a 1918 Ruritanian novel by Pierre Benoît. The book - Benoît's first - was a bestseller in France; an English version, released as The Secret Spring in 1920, enjoyed only limited success.

== Story ==
In October 1914, a young officer in the French army is part of a unit commanded by Lieutenant Raoul Vignerte, with the two becoming fast friends. They learn the Germans in the trenches facing them are from the fictional principality of Lautenburg-Detmold, a fact that leaves Vignerte visibly troubled; in the course of a sleepless night in a dugout, he shares with the officer an account of his experience at the archducal court of Lautenburg-Detmold just before the outbreak of the war.

In late 1913, Vignerte, nearly broke and at an impasse, is contemplating giving up his dream of an academic career and accepting a dreary provincial teaching job when he by chance runs into an old university classmate who has risen high in the civil service. The friend recommends him for a position in Lautenburg-Detmold, whose Grand Duke has asked the French ambassador to procure a tutor for his fifteen-year-old son. Dazzled by the generosity of the honorarium being offered, Vignerte dismisses the misgivings of his beloved mentor, Professor Thierry, who believes that there is something ominous about the archducal household - though he cannot give further details, except a hint that the death of the Grand Duke's first wife may not have been due to natural causes, and a warning to have nothing to do with a certain baron von Boose.

Vignerte arrives at the palace and acquaints himself with its small social circle - except for the Grand Duchess Aurora, the Russian wife of Grand Duke Friedrich (and widow of the previous Grand Duke, Friedrich's brother Rudolf, who died on an expedition to Africa shortly after marrying her.) Upon seeing Aurora for the first time at a military parade in December, Vignerte becomes infatuated with her, but at their first meeting at a grand reception that night, the Grand Duchess dismisses him after he chivalrously attempts to return a flower she has dropped.

The lovesick Vignerte attempts to bury his frustration in work, delving into the archducal library, whose rare manuscripts he had promised to investigate for Thierry, a specialist in German history. During this time, Vignerte thinks about Philip Christoph von Königsmarck, who mysteriously disappeared in 1694 .The young nobleman is thought to have been murdered while conducting an affair with Sophia Dorothea of Celle, the unhappily-married Electrix of Hanover. In a volume, Vignerte finds the handwritten itinerary of the ill-fated African expedition that took Grand Duke Rudolf's life; he sends it to the Grand Duchess, and is rewarded with an immediate audience. Aurora apologizes for her earlier rudeness - suggesting it was unavoidable, for reasons she cannot give - and invites him to her chambers, where she (and her handmaiden Melusine) dazzle Vignerte with exotic splendor. From that point onward, he becomes one of the Grand Duchess' intimate companions, while her devoted equerry Hagen seethes with jealousy at his presence. The Grand Duke visits during a lesson and commends Vignerte on his work with his heir; he is surprisingly unconcerned by the amount of time the tutor is spending with his wife, and thanks him for lifting her spirits.

Aurora later describes the history of her family and her own path to Lautenburg to Vignerte. Her family hail from Tyumen in Western Siberia and are of princely rank, tracing their descent back to a 10th-century vassal of Yaroslav of Kyiv. More recently, they have ruled a domain on the Volga not far from Astrakhan, where they have intermarried with Armenians, Kalmyks, and Persians, as well as - more recently - Western European nobility, Aurora's own mother having been a Hohenzollern princess. She describes her childhood in a palace on an island on the Volga, her love of shooting, riding, and the hunt, and - ominously - an incident in which her father brutally murdered her Italian piano teacher after he had made an advance on her. She explains that she met Grand Duke Rudolf - a quiet, awkward, sincere man - during a visit of the Kaiser to Moscow. He had immediately asked for her hand, an offer which she initially spurned, but relented to please her ambitious father and to satisfy her own bemused guilt after leading Rudolf on a hard ride during a court hunt, which resulted in his breaking his leg. In accepting his proposal, however, she had warned Rudolf that all he could expect from her was loyalty and friendship, not love; in the year after the marriage, when his secret hope that he might gain her romantic affection does not bear fruit, the Grand Duke grows melancholy and withdraws into his hobby, the study of geology. He is delighted when the Kaiser assigns him a secret mission to study potential mineral deposits in a disputed part of Cameroon, and travels there with his adjutant von Boose, dying of sunstroke mid-expedition.

Aurora inherits the throne of Lautenburg-Detmold and rules alone for six months, after which she suddenly comes under intense pressure from both her father and the Kaiser to marry Rudolph's brother Friedrich. Her father's motivation is to keep her in the line of succession for the throne of Wurtenberg (which is governed by the Salic Law, and therefore closed to women), while the Kaiser's intervention in the matter is (in Aurora's opinion) due to extortion by Friedrich; she mentions the then-recent Eulenburg affair, strongly insinuating that Friedrich is bisexual and in possession of kompromat on two of the imperial princes. Bowing to the inevitable, Aurora marries her brother-in-law in March 1912; to his polite bemusement, she orders the corridor connecting their bedrooms walled up while the wedding banquet is still in progress.

In May 1914, Vignerte discovers the long-lost deathbed confession of one of the assassins of count Königsmarck in the archducal archives. It mentions a hidden chamber in which the body was first secreted; realizing that the same master craftsman that had installed it in the royal palace of Hanover had also done work in Lautenburg, Vignerte sneaks into the armoury and find an identical hidden passage in its fireplace, accessed by the "secret spring" of the English title. Behind several gates - one of them booby-trapped - he finds a chamber in which a human body has been dissolved in quicklime, with only bone fragments remaining. Of these, the tibia bears a characteristic fracture mark; the unspoken implication is that Rudolf had never left Lautenburg for Africa, but had been murdered (at Friedrich's behest) by von Boose, who had afterward forged the Grand Duke's African correspondence.

Shaken, Vignerte informs Aurora, who - after an enormous initial shock - resolves to view the remains herself. The two are covertly making their way to the armoury near midnight when a fire suddenly erupts in the wing of the castle containing it. Vignerte runs into the burning building and discovers his bedroom has been bolted from outside, in an apparent attempt to kill him. The fire is put out, and blamed on the experiments of the young Duke's science tutor, a distinguished but eccentric professor who had operated a lab in the wing and had died in the conflagration. Aurora intimates that only one other person had known of her purpose that night; the following day, as Vignerte watches in horror, she cold-bloodedly murders Melusine in a staged hunting accident. Vignerte is himself shortly challenged to a duel by Hagen, driven mad with jealousy, but Aurora suspects something and interrupts the proceeding, chastising both participants.

Aurora reveals she has coerced von Boose to return from Africa to Lautenburg, in order to unmask the conspiracy behind her husband's death. Suddenly, events are interrupted by the outbreak of the World War; Hagen shows up to arrest Vignerte, suddenly an enemy alien, but Aurora uses her psychological hold on Hagen to extort his cooperation and personally speeds Vignerte to the French border. Vignerte begs her to cross over with him, but she refuses, swearing to exact revenge on von Boose. She kisses him on the forehead and departs, leaving a dazed, heartbroken Vignerte to return to Paris and join his reserve unit, which - with dawn breaking - concludes his narrative.

Later that morning, the French conduct a successful raid across no-man's land, and the narrator is ordered to his battalion's command post to help interrogate a captured German officer, whom he is shocked to recognize as von Boose. On his person, he finds a scrawled, unsent letter to Grand Duke Friedrich, confirming von Boose's complicity in the deaths of the former Grand Duke and the Grand Duchess (indicating that Aurora has been murdered as well.) Von Boose accuses Friedrich of attempting to use the war to rid him of the last witness to his crimes, and threatens to expose him in print unless he is immediately reassigned away from the front lines. The narrator asks that Vignerte be summoned to explain the letter to the commandant, but as the former approaches the narrator is suddenly dismayed to realize he will be the cause of his friend learning of Grand Duchess' death. However, on his way the command post, Vignerte is caught in the open during a retaliatory German artillery barrage, and dies before learning Aurora's fate.

== Adaptations ==
The novel has been adapted for the screen four times: a 1923 silent film was followed by (French-language) sound versions in 1935 and 1953, and a Franco-German TV movie in 1968.
