= Pierre Benoit (novelist) =

French writer (1886–1962)

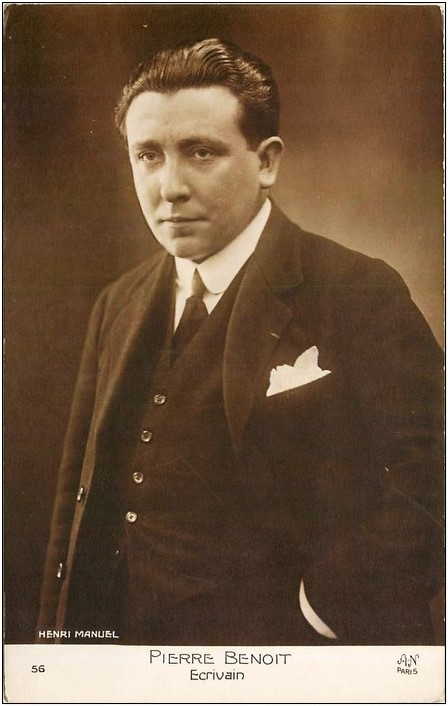
- Born: 16 July 1886; Albi, Tarn, France
- Died: 3 March 1962 (aged 75); Ciboure, Pyrénées-Atlantiques, France
- Occupations: Novelist, Screenwriter

Pierre Benoit (French pronunciation: [pjɛʁ bənwa]; 16 July 1886 – 3 March 1962) was a French novelist, screenwriter and member of the Académie française. He is perhaps best known for his second novel L'Atlantide (1919) that has been filmed several times.

== Biography ==
Pierre Benoit, born in Albi (southern France) was the son of a French soldier. Benoit spent his early years and military service in Northern Africa, before becoming a civil servant and librarian. In 1914 he published his first book of poems. He then joined the French army and after the Battle of Charleroi was hospitalised and demobilised.

His first novel, Koenigsmark, was published in 1918; L'Atlantide was published the next year and was awarded the Grand Prize of the Académie française, from which he became a member in 1931.

In 1923 Benoit was sent to Turkey as a journalist of Le Journal and later visited other nations. During this decade, many of his novels were turned into films, including La Châtelaine du Liban.

A political right-winger, Benoit was an admirer of Maurice Barrès and Charles Maurras. During the Nazi Occupation of France, Benoît joined the "Groupe Collaboration", a pro-Nazi arts group whose other members included Abel Bonnard, Georges Claude and Pierre Drieu La Rochelle. This led him to be arrested in September 1944; he was eventually released after six months, but his work remained on the "blacklist" of French Nazi collaborators for several years afterwards.

He attempted to resign from the Académie française in 1959 in protest over their refusal to accept the writer Paul Morand after his application was vetoed by General Charles DeGaulle.

Late in his life, Benoit gave a series of interviews with the French writer Paul Guimard.

He died in March 1962 in Ciboure.

== Style of novels ==
Each of Benoit's novels consist of exactly 227 pages and have the heroine's name begin with the letter "A".

== Selected bibliography ==
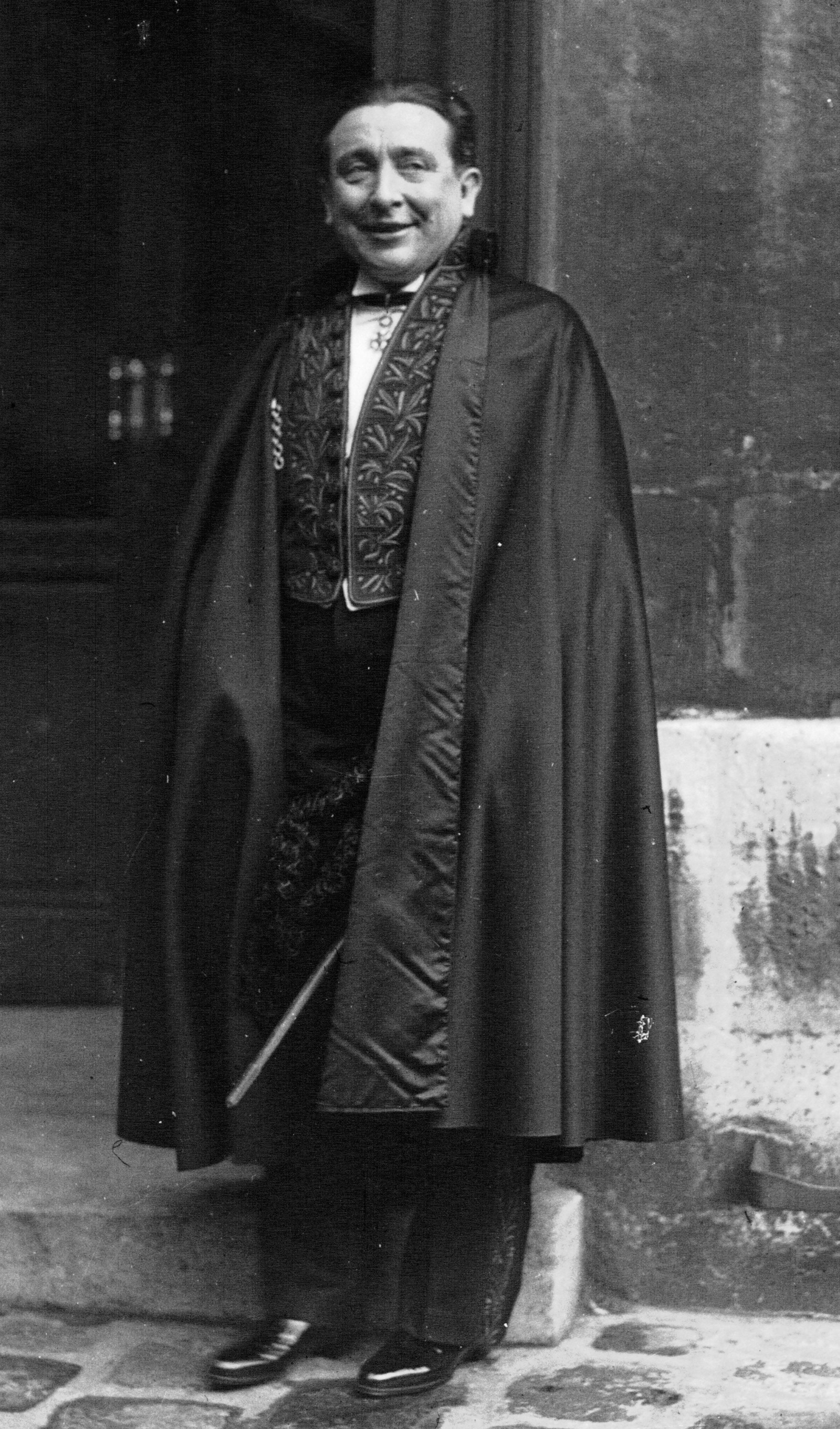
Pierre Benoit in 1932

- Koenigsmark (1918; transl. as The Secret Spring, 1920)
- L'Atlantide (1919; transl. as Atlantida, 1920)
- La Chaussée des Géants (The Giant's Causeway) (1922)
- Salt Lake (1922)
- L'Oublié (The Forgotten Man) (1922)
- Mademoiselle de La Ferté (1923)
- The Lady of Lebanon (1924)
- Le Puits de Jacob (Jacob's Well) (1925)
- Alberte (1926)
- Le Roi Lépreux (The Leper King) (2016)
- Axelle (1928)
- Le Soleil de Minuit (The Midnight Sun) (1930)
- Boissière (1935)
- La Dame de l'Ouest (1936)
- L'Homme qui était trop grand (The Man Who Was Too Tall) (1936)
- Les Compagnons d'Ulysse (1937)
- Bethsabée (1938)
- The Environs of Aden (1940)
- The Gobi Desert (1941)
- Lunegarde (Moonkeep) (1942)
- L'Oiseau des Ruines (Bird of the Ruins) (1947)
- Aïno (1948)
- Les Agriates (1950)
- La Sainte Vehme (The Holy Vehme) (1954), illustrated by Jean Dries
- Villeperdue (Lost City) (1954)
- Montsalvat (1999)

== Filmography ==
- L'Atlantide, directed by Jacques Feyder (France, 1921, based on the novel Atlantida)
- Koenigsmark, directed by Léonce Perret (France, 1923, based on the novel Koenigsmark)
- Le Puits de Jacob, directed by Edward José (France, 1925, based on the novel Le Puits de Jacob)
- La Chaussée des géants, directed by Robert Boudrioz and Jean Durand (France, 1926, based on the novel La Chaussée des géants)
- The Midnight Sun, directed by Dimitri Buchowetzki (1926, based on the novel Le Soleil de minuit)
- Le Soleil de minuit, directed by Richard Garrick and Jean Legrand (France, 1926, based on the novel Le Soleil de minuit)
- The Lady of Lebanon, directed by Marco de Gastyne (France, 1926, based on the novel La Châtelaine du Liban)
- Princesse Mandane, directed by Germaine Dulac (France, 1928, based on the novel L'Oublié)
- Surrender, directed by William K. Howard (1931, based on the novel Axelle)
- L'Atlantide, directed by G. W. Pabst (French-language version, 1932, based on the novel Atlantida)
  - Die Herrin von Atlantis, directed by G. W. Pabst (German-language version, 1932, based on the novel Atlantida)
  - The Mistress of Atlantis, directed by G. W. Pabst (English-language version, 1932, based on the novel Atlantida)
- The Lady of Lebanon, directed by Jean Epstein (France, 1934, based on the novel La Châtelaine du Liban)
- Koenigsmark, directed by Maurice Tourneur (France-UK, 1935, based on the novel Koenigsmark)
- Boissière, directed by Fernand Rivers (France, 1937, based on the novel Boissière)
- Angélica, directed by Jean Choux (France, 1939, based on the novel Les Compagnons d'Ulysse)
- Girl of the Golden West, directed by Carl Koch (Italy, 1942, based on the novel La Dame de l'Ouest)
- Le Soleil de minuit, directed by Bernard Roland (France, 1943, based on the novel Le Soleil de minuit)
- Lunegarde, directed by Marc Allégret (France, 1946, based on the novel Lunegarde)
- Dizziness, directed by Antonio Momplet (Mexico, 1946, based on the novel Alberte)
- Bethsabée, directed by Léonide Moguy (France, 1947, based on the novel Bethsabée)
- Siren of Atlantis, directed by Gregg G. Tallas (1949, based on the novel Atlantida)
- Mademoiselle de La Ferté, directed by Roger Dallier (France, 1949, based on the novel Mademoiselle de La Ferté)
- Koenigsmark, directed by Solange Térac (France, 1953, based on the novel Koenigsmark)
- It Happened in Aden, directed by Michel Boisrond (France, 1956, based on the novel The Environs of Aden)
- The Lebanese Mission, directed by Richard Pottier (France, 1956, based on the novel La Châtelaine du Liban)
- Journey Beneath the Desert, directed by Edgar G. Ulmer (Italy-France, 1961, based on the novel Atlantida)
- L'Atlantide (1972 film), directed by Jean Kerchbron (a 1972 French made-for-television film based on the novel Atlantida)
- L'Atlantide, directed by Bob Swaim (France-Italy, 1992, based on the novel Atlantida)

=== Screenwriter ===
- 1925: The Night Watch (dir. Marcel Silver)
- 1934: Moscow Nights (1934 film) (dir. Alexis Granowsky)
- 1935: Moscow Nights (dir. Anthony Asquith)
- 1936: Taras Bulba (dir. Alexis Granowsky)
- 1943: Colonel Chabert (dir. René Le Hénaff)
- 1943: Vautrin (dir. Pierre Billon)
