= Koenigsmark (1923 film) =

1923 film

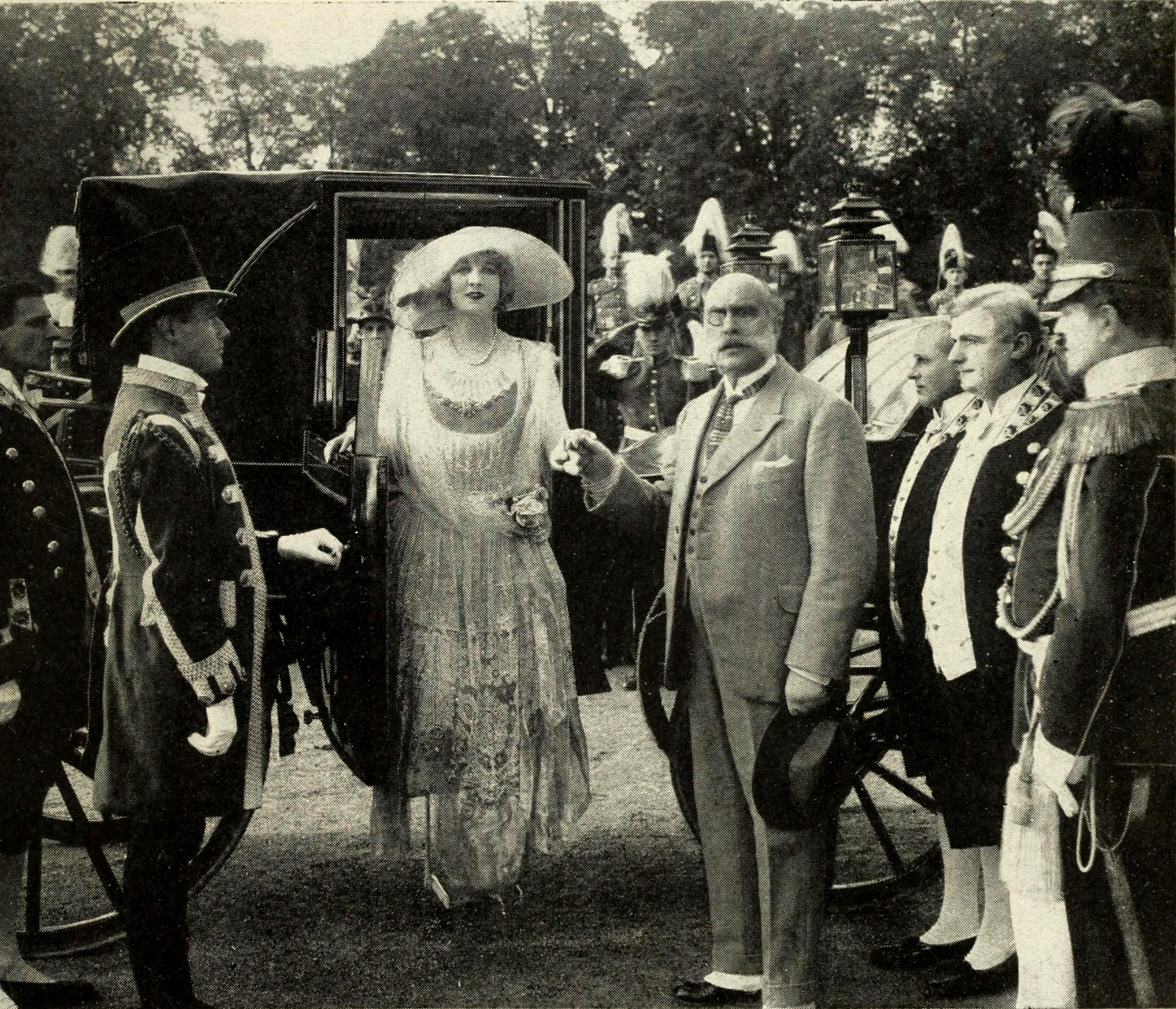
- Huguette Duflos in a scene from the film.
- Directed by: Léonce Perret
- Written by: Pierre Benoit (novel); René Champigny; Léonce Perret
- Starring: Maurice Lehmann; Huguette Duflos; Jaque Catelain
- Cinematography: Jacques Bizeul(fr); Gustave Preiss
- Music by: Jean Déré; Joseph-Étienne Szyfer
- Production company: Films Radia
- Distributed by: Pathé Consortium Cinéma
- Release date: 16 November 1923
- Running time: 180 minutes
- Country: France
- Languages: Silent; French intertitles

Koenigsmark (1923)

Koenigsmark is a 1923 French silent drama film directed by Léonce Perret and starring Maurice Lehmann, Huguette Duflos and Jaque Catelain. It is an adaptation of the 1918 novel Koenigsmark by Pierre Benoit. It was the first of several screen adaptations of the work. It is also known by the alternative title of The Secret Spring.

In 1926 it was released in the United States by Paramount Pictures.

== Cast ==
- Maurice Lehmann as Philippe de Koenigsmark
- Huguette Duflos as Grande-duchesse Aurore de Lautenbourg
- Jaque Catelain as Professeur Raoul Vignerte
- Georges Vaultier as Grand-duc Frédéric de Lautenbourg
- André Liabel as Baron de Boose
- Iván Petrovich as Lieutenant de Hagen
- Julio de Romero as Prince Tumène
- Paul Vermoyal as Cyrus Beck
- Karl Heyl as Roi Stephen II
- Jean Aymé as Monsieur de Marsais
- C. Farnet as Ribeyre
- Clara Tambour as Totoche
- Diana Kotchaki as Comtesse de Platen
- A. Debriège as Natacha
- Jean Fleury as Prince Joachim
- Robert Guilbert as De Kessel
- Laurent Morléas as Monsieur de Bernhardt
- Fernand Mailly as Monsieur de Choisly
- Philippe Rolla as Monsieur de Wendel
- Henry Houry as Grand-duc Rodolphe de Lautenbourg
- Marcya Capri as Mélusine de Graffenfried
- Pierre de Canolle as Lieutenant allemand
- Renée Sylvaire as Nini
- Suzanne Valrose as Sophie-Dorothée
- Jules de Spoly

== Bibliography ==
- Goble, Alan. The Complete Index to Literary Sources in Film. Walter de Gruyter, 1999.
