= GP Archives =

- Logo used since 2019
- Formerly: Gaumont Pathé Archives (2003–2019)
- Type: Division
- Industry: Film and television archive
- Predecessors: Cinémathèque Gaumont; Pathé Archives
- Founded: 2003; 23 years ago
- Founders: Gaumont; Pathé
- Headquarters: Neuilly-sur-Seine, France
- Key people: Sidonie Dumas (CEO)
- Parent: Gaumont; Pathé (2003–2019)
- Website: gparchives.com

GP Archives is a department of Gaumont, and one of the largest film archives in France. It is now the leading French image bank illustrating the history of the 20th and 21st centuries.

It was founded as Gaumont Pathé Archives in 2003 following the merger of the archive departments of the world's two oldest film studios, Gaumont and Pathé. It was renamed GP Archives in 2019.

== Film library ==
The archive contains nearly 12,000 hours of footage including Gaumont, Pathé and Éclair newsreels from 1908 to 1979, Sygma archives and the recently acquired Soviet archives from the Arkeion catalog, and numerous documentaries.

GP Archives also conserves and showcases silent movies from the combined catalogues of Gaumont and Pathé which contains over 2,000 titles. These include films by the founding fathers of French cinema, from Leonce Perret and Albert Capellani to Ferdinand Zecca and Louis Feuillade.

== Corporate structure ==
GP Archives was formed on November 18, 2003 as Gaumont Pathé Archives with the merger of Cinémathèque Gaumont and Pathé Archives film libraries. The company, chaired by Martine Offroy, was 57.5%-owned by Gaumont and 42.5% by Pathé. On June 29, 2019, Gaumont repurchased from Pathé all of its shares in the joint venture for €136,000. Following this transaction, Gaumont Pathé Archives was renamed GP Archives.
