= Léonce Perret =

French film actor, director and producer

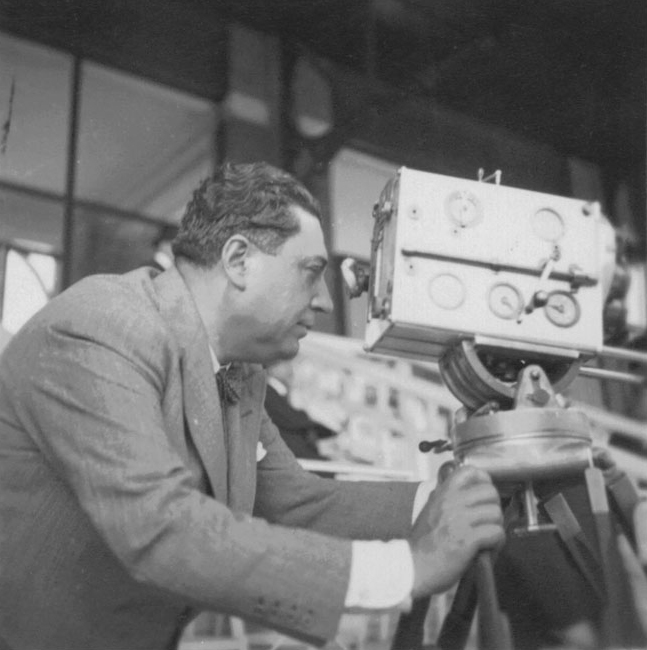
- Born: Léonce Joseph Perret; 14 March 1880; Niort, Deux-Sèvres, France
- Died: 12 August 1935 (aged 55); Paris, France
- Occupations: Actor, director, producer
- Years active: 1900–1935

Léonce Joseph Perret (14 March 1880 – 12 August 1935) was a prolific and innovative French film actor, director and producer. He also worked as a stage actor and director. Often described as avant-garde for his unorthodox directing methods, Perret introduced innovative camera, lighting and film scoring techniques to French cinema.

Perret began his career as a relatively undistinguished stage actor. He was recruited to the film industry by Gaumont. His numerous short films gained significant accolade in French cinematography. Until his emigration to the United States in 1917, he was a fixture of Gaumont. On American soil, he produced several popular films, the most notable being Lest We Forget (N'oublions jamais) in 1918.

After returning to France, he directed the successful Koenigsmark in 1923. His film Madame Sans-Gêne (1925), starring Gloria Swanson, was the first joint Franco-American film production. In addition, Perret collaborated with many of the French and American idols of his generation such as Abel Gance, Gloria Swanson, Gaby Morlay, René Cresté, Arletty, Suzanne Grandais, Mae Murray, and Huguette Duflos.

== Biography ==
=== Early life ===
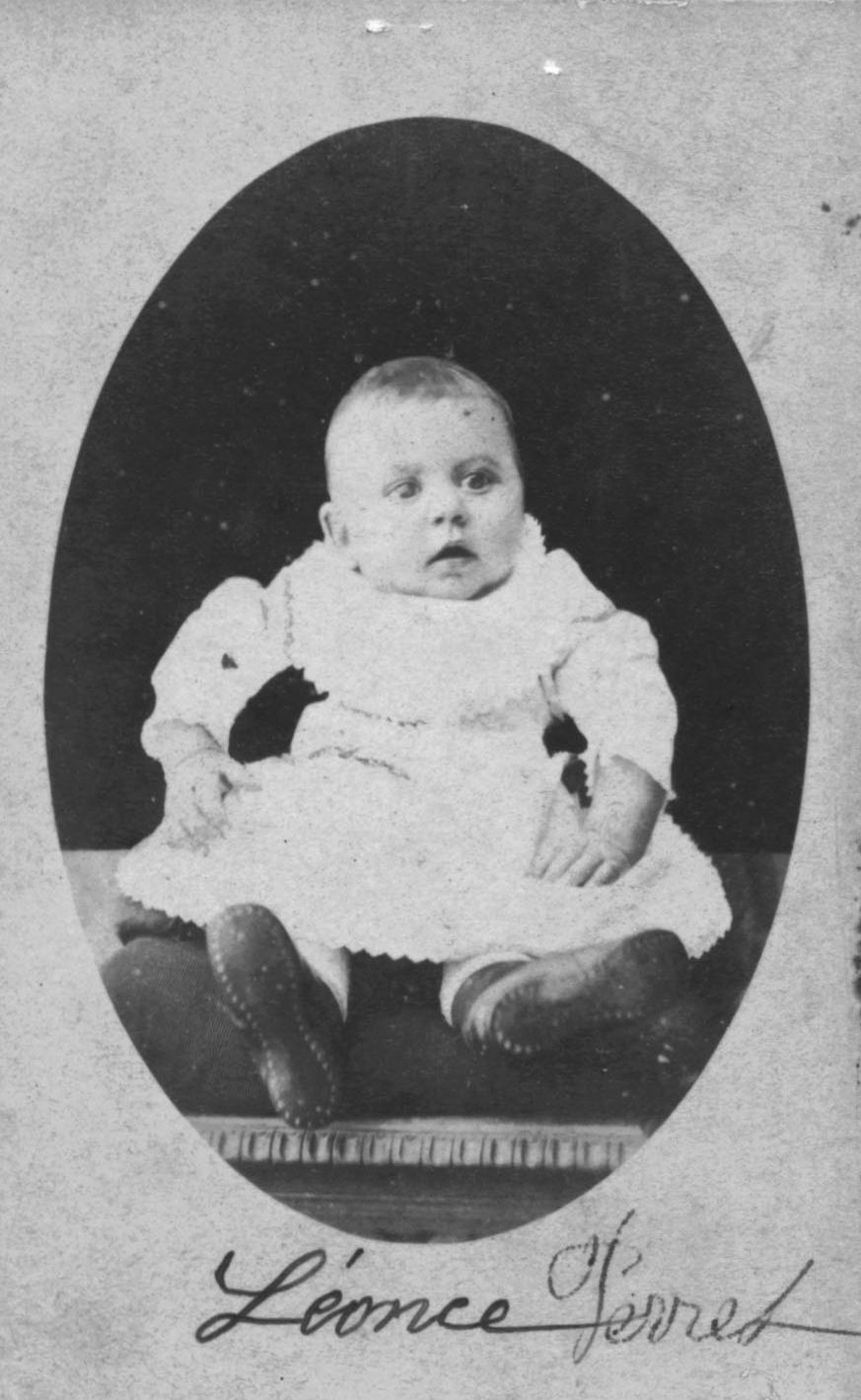
Perret as a baby

Léonce Perret was born in 1880 to Eliès Ferdinand Perret and Marie Collinet. His parents owned a woodworking shop on Yver Street in Niort, France. Léonce showed a taste for the arts from an early age, in particular for acting and poetry. During his adolescence, Léonce fell seriously ill and had to go to Paris to see medical specialists. He stayed in the capital for several months while being treated. It was during this brief stay that he began to dream of life as an artist.

After many discussions with his parents in Niort, he received their blessing to pursue this dream. He returned to Paris and rented a small room on the Boulevard Saint-Michel near the Luxembourg Garden. Here, he was able to immerse himself in his favorite books. His health complications came back, but he made a slow recovery. Later, he was granted a medical exemption from military service on 21 March 1901.

=== Introduction to theatre ===
Perret enrolled in the new music school, Schola Cantorum, located in the Montparnasse neighborhood of Paris. His talent as an excellent singer and flute player soon became apparent, thus began his very prolific artistic career. During this time, he loved to watch plays at the theatre in his free time and felt more and more drawn to the stage. He participated in small stage productions in order to learn the trade; he had to accept any offer that came his way to get paid, which often amounted to a pittance. At the same time he continued to take music and theatre classes.

In 1899, Perret got the call for a six-month tour which enabled him to travel throughout Europe and to Russia. He was finally noticed by the playwright Eugène Brieux, who tapped him in the spring of 1900 for his first important role in the play La Robe rouge (The Red Dress). Then destiny smiled on Perret in June 1900 when he got his first contract as a young headliner at the Athénée theatre, one of his longtime dreams. In 1902, he toured again in Europe visiting Italy, Switzerland, Germany, Russia, etc., acting in plays by Alexandre Dumas, fils, Alfred Capus, Marcel Prévost, and Émile Augier. He gained much theatrical experience during those years. Perret the actor began to get himself noticed by his performances, especially when he started acting at the Vaudeville theatre in the beginning of 1903, notably playing the leading role in the play Ruy Blas.

In 1905, Perret signed a new contract with the Odéon, working first under the director Abel Tarride, then André Antoine. He continued to tour in the theatres of Paris, the provinces of France, and sometimes Europe; however, he had severe financial difficulties during this period since he was rarely given the leading role.

In 1909, he was employed for several months in a Saint Petersburg theatre during another trip to Russia. On the way back to France he stopped in Berlin to act in the play Cyrano de Bergerac. It was there that Mr. Grassi, the director of Gaumont Germany, recruited him for a new occupation: filmmaking.

=== Film career ===
Perret saw working behind a camera as an extension of his theatrical work, unlike the rest of the theatre world who looked down on the cinema. In 1909, he directed his first three short films in Berlin. They included the pacifist film Pourquoi la guerre? Next, he began directing short films of 4–5 minutes from his own screenplays, such as Le Bon Juge and Fan-Fan le petit grenadier.

From Berlin, he went back to Paris and found employment at Gaumont under the artistic direction of Louis Feuillade. He started out there as an actor in a good number of films shot in the Gaumont studios at 53, rue de la Villette. He then moved up the ladder quickly at Gaumont thanks to his directing experience from Berlin. Around this time he met Valentine Petit, a singer and dancer who was working at the Folies Bergère. She became his wife several years later. Valentine acted in several of Perret's films and helped him greatly in his business dealings.

Perret and the cast at Gaumont worked with many actors including Suzy Prim, Yvette Andréyor, Suzanne Grandais, etc. Perret acted in many of the films he directed. Le Feu à la mine (1911), was one of his first films to be relatively successful. In 1913, he started the "Léonce" series which consisted of Perret himself playing dramatic, comic and even burlesque characters; he would film around forty episodes of this series. That same year he directed the dramatic comedy Le Mariage de minuit (Midnight Marriage) featuring Suzanne Grandais, an actress he had discovered at the Moulin Rouge. Suzanne subsequently became quite popular.

Even though the public still didn't know Perret by name, his face was starting to become familiar. In fact, until 1913, the names of the director and actors were not included in the credits due to the studios' near-prohibition. One day, Perret demanded that Gaumont and Louis Feuillade include the leading actors' names in the credits, a precedent that was soon followed by all the other directors of the time.

Trying new techniques, Perret progressively filmed more outdoors and, sometimes, outside of Paris. He even experimented with the police genre with the trilogy Main de fer. The same year Perret directed L'Enfant de Paris, the film that would mark the end of his financial difficulties and make his reputation as one of the best French directors of his era. L'Enfant de Paris was subsequently remade several times. Perret demonstrated with this film that French filmmaking technique rivaled that of the Americans, even the technique of the eminent American director D. W. Griffith.

Furthermore, at a showing of L'Enfant de Paris at the French Film Library in 1951, Georges Sadoul stated: "Perret made brilliant use of every editing resource at his disposal: varied camera angles, backlighting, his cameraman Specht's beautiful photography… all while working from a rather ordinary script that borrowed heavily from the Deux orphelines. Mixing Ennery's melodrama with a few jingoistic episodes, Léonce Perret was able to render a graceful and lively story by using an extraordinarily refined cinematic repertoire: backlighting, low-angle shots, close-ups, moving shots and numerous other innovations, all of which Perret implemented with flair, in stark contrast to Louis Feuillade's minimalist style and the still somewhat primitive technique of David W. Griffith at that time." Thus, Perret demonstrated that the French cinematic technique of that time transcended that of the Americans.

Like many of his peers during World War I, Perret directed several patriotic and jingoistic movies such as La voie de la Patrie. Military music was played during the film's projection, an innovative idea for that period.

Perret was second in command at Gaumont under Louis Feuillade during this very successful period of the French film industry; when French films were being shown in many foreign countries. However, in 1914, the war broke out and movie-making ground to a halt. Everyone was called up to serve in the army, including Perret, who for a time was conscripted as a nurse's aide in Niort as he was unable to fight due to his health problems. At Léon Gaumont's request he returned to filmmaking in 1915 to make several patriotic shorts like Françaises, veillez! (Frenchwomen, take care!), a short film warning women on the home front to be aware of possible traitors. Soon after, he released Debout les morts, a film based on one of Victor Hugo's novels.

Until 1916, Perret alternated between patriotic and sentimental films. Even though he was named artistic director of Gaumont in 1915 in place of Feuillade (who was fighting on the front), he began complaining about the lack of financial resources Gaumont was willing to commit to his films. Perret wanted to direct bigger budget films. His contract with Gaumont was set to expire at the end of 1916.

=== American film producer ===
Perret believed that "the cinema has won the freedom to go where it chooses throughout the world and has become a universal medium that facilitates open artistic and commercial exchanges." He arrived in the United States in February 1917, just a few weeks before the U.S. joined the Allied forces in World War I. He settled in Richmond, Virginia, a region that was at the time developing a filmmaking industry in competition with Hollywood.

A favorable contract was signed with the World Film Company, an independent production company founded by Jules Brulatour and Lewis J. Selznick. This was a sizable community of expatriate French directors in America looking to participate in the rapidly growing American film industry. His first film shot in the U.S. was The Silent Master, based on a novel by Phillips Oppenheim. A Modern Othello quickly followed, based on a short story by the French writer Ernest M. Laumann.

Shortly afterwards, he directed Lest We Forget, which showed the world the image of a heroic and wounded France. The postwar propaganda was released in 1918 and was enormously successful in France. Its release shortly preceded the signing of the armistice that ended World War I. This film and other film successes during that year supplied Perret with enough money to start his own production company: Perret Pictures, Inc., which was affiliated with the distributor Pathé Exchange.

The Twin Pawns (1919)

With this new company, he produced and directed a series of films including La 13ème chaise based on the play by Bayard Veiller and The Twin Pawns starring the Hollywood celebrity Mae Murray. His 1920 film, The Lifting Shadows, strongly criticized the newly ascended powers in Russia and revealed Perret's prejudices towards Bolshevism. His string of successful films continued until 1921 when an economic recession in the U.S. put the brakes on the burgeoning film industry.

=== International success ===
Perret decided to give up working in the United States for good at the end of summer 1921. His passion for the renewal of French cinematography was evident in this statement:

"The artistic, economic, scientific and social ambitions of the film industry are so strong that its potential is limitless. It should be one of our most important domestic industries. But to get French film back on top, a place it never should have lost, and to assure its global expansion, the domestic film industry has to have a global vision in its subject matter, artisanship and casting. Our great history and tradition can provide the inspiration for international films, a fact that is not unknown to our foreign competitors who have pulled their story lines for their latest films from French history as told by our most famous novelists and playwrights."

Having benefited from the all research and progress made in the American cinema, he planned to adapt his newly acquired knowledge to the French film industry. Back in France, he became one of the great innovators of film direction. By September, he was already directing and producing his first film back on French soil: L’Ecuyère, distributed by Pathé-Consortium-Cinéma.

Koenigsmark (1923)

Around the same time he started considering doing a film adaptation of the Pierre Benoit novel Koenigsmark. The completed film starring Huguette Duflos was released to French theatres in March 1924. Koenigsmark was tremendously successful with moviegoers and is still considered today to be one of the landmark films of the 1920s. Moreover, in 2002, the film was restored by the French Film Library under the direction of Claudine Kaufmann.

Madame Sans-Gêne (1925), released by Paramount Pictures and starring Gloria Swanson, was the first joint Franco-American film production. The retelling of the French Revolution overthrowing King Louis XVI enjoyed record box office receipts in both France and the United States. Unfortunately, Madame Sans-Gêne is now considered a lost film since no copies of the film are known to exist.

Perret was one of the benchmarks of French cinema in his era; his films were regularly greeted with critical acclaim. 1926 and 1927 saw the release of La Femme nue based on the play by Henry Bataille and Morgane la sirène based on the novel by Charles Le Goffic. A new production and distribution company entered onto the French film scene at the end of March 1927: Franco-Film. Perret was named artistic director and board member of this new company operating out of the Rex Ingram studios in Nice, France. The goal of the new production company was to make French films a worldwide success. Joining Perret at the helm of Franco-Film were: production director Edgard Costil, director Camille de Morlhon and several other pioneering directors such as Raymond Bernard, Jean Duran, Léon Mathot, etc.

The first film Perret distributed with Franco-Film, Morgane la sirène, was wildly successful in France, England and Canada, which confirmed the young company's international ambitions. Printemps d’amour, the first French color film using the new American technology Technicolor, came out that same year starring Louis Lagrange and the American actress Hope Hampton. Afterwards Perret produced his last two silent films: La Danseuse Orchidée (with the American actor Ricardo Cortez as well as Xenia Desni and Marcya Capri) and another film adaptation of a Henry Bataille play called La Possession (with the Italian actress Francesca Bertini).

Perret left an indelible mark on the cinema of the 1920s. Often called the "magician of film" by his peers, he clearly belongs in the silent film hall of fame. Henri Langlois, a pioneer in film preservation, observed that "Léonce Perret's legacies to cinema are his aesthetic discoveries and priceless refinements."

=== Beginning of talking pictures ===
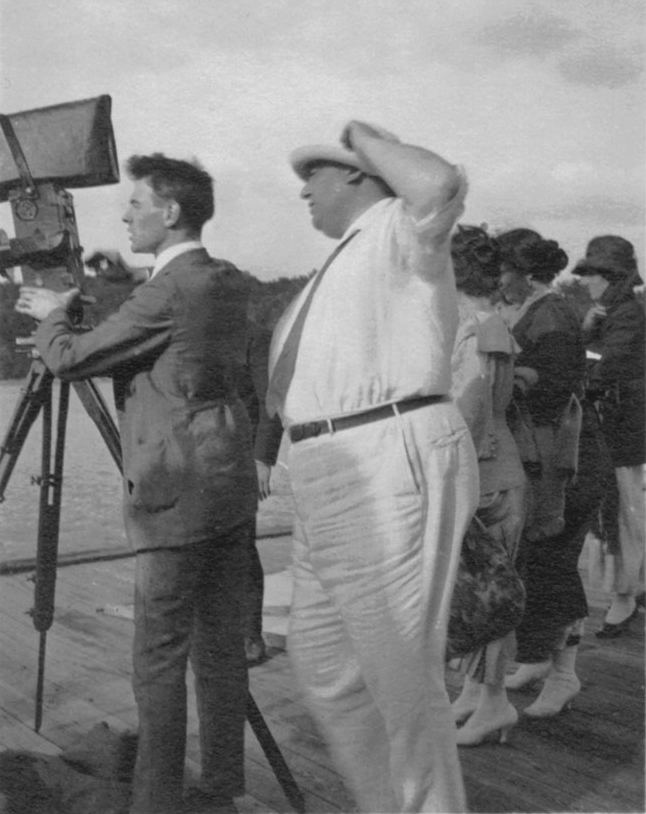
Perret on the set in 1930

Convinced that there was a future in talking films, Perret directed an adaptation of Huguette Garnier's famous novel entitled Quand nous étions deux in 1929. However, his first talking film met with only mild success compared to the other competing films of that period. In general, the Franco-Film company was having difficulty adapting to talking films. After he finished Quand nous étions deux, Perret decided to leave the Franco-Film. He didn't quit the film industry, however; his next project was a collaboration with Adolphe Osso, the founder of the production company Osso. Together they shot Perret's first live sound film Arthur. He followed that up in 1931 with a film adaptation of a play by Pierre Wolff and Henri Duvernois called Après l'amour starring Gaby Morlay, a film that was particularly successful in Belgium. Perret's next project was Grains de beauté in 1932, followed by Enlevez-moi, a film that showcased the young actress Arletty as well as the veteran actor Roger Tréville.

The next year Perret collaborated with the queen of stage and film Gaby Morlay and his former colleague André Luguet to shoot his new film Il était une fois with the company Pathé-Nathan. Based on a play by Francis de Croisset, the movie won the best French film of the year award from the weekly cinema review Pour Vous. Next Perret adapted Alphonse Daudet's novel Sapho in 1933. As he had already acted in a stage adaptation of the novel when he was doing theatre, he knew the subject well. In 1934, while working with the Comédie-Française, Perret tried an experimental type of play-documentary from Molière's body of work. Although the experiment was met with limited success, it proved to be an inspiration for other artists such as Sacha Guitry who later created similar types of experimental films.

While working on a new bilingual (French-English) talking version of Koenigsmark, Perret fell ill and had to be hospitalized at the Saint Jean de Dieu clinic in Paris. He died on 12 August 1935 and was buried in Niort.

However, Perret is surprisingly unfamiliar to the generations of movie buffs that followed him. Cinema historians give him little consideration in their published research. For example, the study of Perret did not exist until 2003, but it was not definitive. Entitled Léonce Perret, the biography was published by the French Association for Historical Film Studies in collaboration with the Bologne Film Library under the direction of Bernard Bastide and Jean A. Gili. In 2006, Daniel Taillé published a more thorough work giving homage to such a pioneering artist. This was entitled Léonce Perret, cinématographiste.

== Tributes ==
The Museum of Modern Art in New York City organized a film exhibition showcasing Perret's work. Gaumont exhibits recently restored films annually at the Museum of Modern Art. In 2003, a selected collection of Perret's best films were restored from nitrite negatives and showcased at this exhibition. The films were selected by Martine Offroy, who was the curator of Gaumont. Gaumont and the Cinémathèque française contributed in the restoration of the films, in collaboration with the Centre National de la Cinématographie and the Ministry of Culture.

== Filmography ==
A definitive filmography for Perret would be virtually impossible given that he wrote, acted in, directed or produced more than 400 films. Of those more than 400 films, only roughly one third are still available today. The remaining copies are stored mostly at the Gaumont Film Library, the French Film Library, the National Cinematography Film Archives and in several other European film libraries such as the Nederlands Filmmuseum in Amsterdam.

=== Screenwriter ===
Perret wrote the screenplays for the vast majority of his movies, with the exception of those from his early apprenticeship period (before 1913). Most of the movies from his apprenticeship period were written by Louis Feuillade, the artistic director at Gaumont at that time. Several others from that period were written by other associates at Gaumont such as Abel Gance, Étienne Arnaud and Marcel Lévesque. After gaining the Gaumont company's trust, Perret began directing his own screenplays starting around 1911.

From 1917 on, he adapted many screenplays from novels such as Folie d'Amour (1917), La treizième chaise (1919) and Koenigsmark (1923). He also collaborated with other filmmakers on some scripts such as Koenigsmark, which was co-written with René Champigny and Madame Sans-Gêne with the American Forrest Halsey.

The screenplay for La Danseuse Orchidée from 1928 is credited to Jean-Joseph Renaud. It is one of the rare postwar Perret films where he did not write the script himself.

=== Producer ===
Perret produced many of his films, starting with his period of work in the United States. In 1917, he started his own production company Perret Picture Inc. Some of the films he produced in the U.S. were La Fayette, We Come (1918) and The Unknown Love (1918) as well as The Twin Pawns (1919) and A.B.C. of Love (1919).

After his return to France, he had the opportunity to produce several movies with the Franco-Film company (Morgane la Sirène and Printemps d'Amour in 1927; La Danseuse Orchidée, Poliche and La Possession in 1928; Quand nous étions deux in 1930).
