= Gunman in the Streets =

1950 film by Frank Tuttle, Borys Lewin

- Cover of DVD release
- Directed by: Frank Tuttle (English version); Borys Lewin (French version)
- Written by: Victor Pahlen (English version); Jacques Companéez; André Tabet (French version)
- Produced by: Victor Pahlen
- Starring: Dane Clark; Simone Signoret; Fernand Gravey; Robert Duke
- Cinematography: Claude Renoir; Eugen Schüfftan
- Edited by: Steve Previn
- Music by: Joe Hajos
- Distributed by: DisCina; International Film Distributors (Canada)
- Release date: 1950
- Running time: 86 min
- Country: France
- Languages: English; French

Gunman in the Streets (Canadian title Gangster at Bay) is a French/US-produced 1950 black-and-white film noir directed by Frank Tuttle and starring Dane Clark and Simone Signoret. Unreleased for theatrical screening in the US, the film was titled Time Running Out for its US television syndication in 1963.

The low-budget B-movie was shot on location in Paris, France. A French-language version of the film (directed by Borys Lewin) was released in France under the title The Hunted.

== Plot ==
American army deserter turned criminal on the run, Eddy Roback, is being chased through the streets of Paris. The fugitive finds his old girlfriend, Denise Vernon (Signoret) and tries to get money from her in an attempt to get across the border to Belgium. The girlfriend's admirer, an American crime reporter (Duke), as well as a countrywide manhunt become obstacles Roback must get past in order to escape. While trying to raise money for him, Denise finds Roback a hiding place in the photographic studio of Max Salva, who may have turned Roback in.

== Cast ==
- Dane Clark as Eddy Roback
- Simone Signoret as Denise Vernon
- Fernand Gravey as Commissioner Dufresne (as Fernand Gravet)
- Robert Duke as Frank Clinton
- Michel André as Max Salva
