= André Tabet =

French Algerian screenwriter

- Born: 27 June 1902; Algiers, French Algeria
- Died: December 18, 1981 (aged 79); Paris, France
- Occupation: Writer
- Years active: 1946-1974 (film)

André Tabet (27 June 1902–18 December 1981) was a French Algerian screenwriter. He was the elder brother of Georges Tabet.

== Selected filmography ==
- That's Not the Way to Die (1946)
- The Unknown Singer (1947)
- Destiny Has Fun (1947)
- Counter Investigation (1947)
- One Night at the Tabarin (1947)
- Fandango (1949)
- The Heroic Monsieur Boniface (1949)
- Gunman in the Streets (1950)
- The Hunted (1950)
- Rendezvous in Grenada (1951)
- Village Feud (1951)
- In the Land of the Sun (1952)
- My Wife, My Cow and Me (1952)
- Full House (1952)
- Daughters of Destiny (1954)
- Mata Hari's Daughter (1954)
- Dangerous Turning (1954)
- Stain in the Snow (1954)
- Ali Baba and the Forty Thieves (1954)
- The Price of Love (1955)
- The Road to Paradise (1956)
- Folies-Bergère (1957)
- Women's Prison (1958)
- The Violet Seller (1958)
- Witness in the City (1959)
- The Night They Killed Rasputin (1960)
- Son of the Circus (1963)
- Les Yeux cernés (1964)
- Une ravissante idiote (1964)
- The Vampire of Düsseldorf (1965)
- La Grande Vadrouille (1966)
- The Oldest Profession (1967)
- Le Temps des loups (1970)
- La Part des lions (1971)

== Bibliography ==
- Hardy, Phil. The BFI Companion to Crime. A&C Black, 1997.ess, 1989.
- Hayward, Susan. Simone Signoret: The Star as Cultural Sign. Continuum, 2004.
