= SS Kembu Maru (1942) =

Japanese cargo ship

History

Japanese Empire
- Name: Empire Blossom (1942–43); Kembu Maru (1943)
- Owner: Japanese Government (1942–43)
- Operator: Imperial Japanese Navy
- Builder: Taikoo Dockyard & Engineering Company, Hong Kong
- Yard number: 303
- Laid down: May 1941
- Launched: 1942
- Completed: February 1943
- Out of service: 4 December 1943
- Fate: Bombed 4 December 1943 and sank, 5 December 1943

General characteristics
- Tonnage: 6,816 GRT; 9,925 DWT
- Length: 137.20 m (450 ft 2 in)
- Beam: 17.30 m (56 ft 9 in)
- Propulsion: 1 x triple expansion steam engine
- Armament: 1 x 5" gun

Kembu Maru also Kenmu Maru (Kanji:健武丸) was a 6,816 GRT cargo ship, which was built in 1941 Taikoo Dockyard and Engineering Company of Hong Kong Ltd. She was built as Empire Blossom and was ready to be launched when Hong Kong was invaded by Japan in December 1941. The ship was completed by the Japanese and put into service. On 4 December 1943, she was damaged by American bombing at Kwajalein Atoll, sinking the next day.

== Description ==
Empire Blossom was built as a 6,603 GRT cargo ship by Taikoo Dockyard and Engineering Company of Hong Kong Ltd. She was laid down in May 1941, as yard number 303. The ship was completed in February 1943. She was 137.20 m (450 ft 2 in) long, with a beam of 17.30 m (56 ft 9 in). On completion, she displaced 6,816 GRT or 9,925 DWT. She was powered by a triple-expansion steam engine.

== Career ==
The engine and boilers intended for Empire Blossom were sent to Singapore on 1 December 1941 aboard the Blue Funnel Line ship Ulysses. The ship was launched as Empire Blossom. She was completed in February 1943 and put into service by the Imperial Japanese Navy as Kembu Maru.

On 4 August 1943, Kembu Maru was damaged by USS Seadragon at 07°33′N 161°12′E. On 4 December 1943, Kembu Maru was bombed and torpedoed by aircraft from USS Lexington. She was carrying a cargo of aviation fuel in drums. The bombing caused the ship to explode, with a column of smoke 10,000 feet (3,000 m) being seen; she sank the next day. At the time of her sinking, she was in the Kwajalein Atoll (09°19′N 167°25′E).
