= First Into Nagasaki =

Book by George Weller

First Into Nagasaki: The Censored Eyewitness Dispatches on Post-Atomic Japan and Its Prisoners of War is a collection of reports by Chicago Daily News foreign correspondent George Weller. Although written in 1945, the dispatches were suppressed by Gen. Douglas MacArthur's military censors and remained unpublished for decades. The reports were eventually recovered, complied, and edited by the author's son, Anthony Weller, and published for the first time in 2006.

== Synopsis ==
The Occupation authorities declared Nagasaki (and Hiroshima) off-limits to reporters.

Weller reports that he was the first outside observer to reach Nagasaki, on September 6, 1945, four weeks following the U.S. atomic bombing of the city. He spent a total of three weeks in Nagasaki and in the nearby Allied POW camps — some of which he "opened", and revisits the series of news reports he published at the time about his experiences.

The first dispatches by non-Japanese reporters were filed by Associated Press correspondent Vern Haugland and New York Times Lawrence who visited Nagasaki September 9, 1945. Captain Joe Snyder, press officer with MacArthur headquarters, in his book Para(graph) Trooper For MacArthur: From the Horse Cavalry to the USS Missouri 1997 Chapter 16 "Nagasaki Inferno" pp199–209 describes "boarding a transport plane packed with reporters headed for Nagasaki.[for example: photographers 1. see Google image search Nagasaki Bernard Hoffman (LIFE Magazine) 2. Bettmann/CORBIS September 13, 1945 Stanley Troutman (Acme war pool) 3. Nagasaki and verso]Other officers and correspondents headed for Hiroshima about the same time, so the world would soon know more than it was prepared to digest about the horrors of the atomic bomb. ... I toured the city with the AP's Jim Hutcheson, among others. He and I had become good friends since our narrow escape on Corregidor. ... There were thousands of stories in Nagasaki and our group saw many pitiful sights of people with radiation burns who, in dreadful agony, were slowly dying. The first thing Japanese doctors asked was if American doctors had a cure for the bomb's effects on the human body. ... We received a report from GHQ that American doctors were coming to Nagasaki soon...." Snyder acknowledges what he calls Wilfrid Burchett's "ingenuity" in successfully reporting from Hiroshima. Snyder does not mention George Weller or any dispatches of George Weller's from Nagasaki. Joe Snyder [1983; owner and editor of the North Missourian] and Walter Cronkite [1964; CBS] are both recipients of the Missouri School of Journalism Honor Medal.

From the first days of the Occupation reporters were cleared to cover freeing and rescue operations on behalf of these prisoners. Weller comments: "What the command wanted covered was the prison camps of northern Japan. The dam was to be opened to one last orgy of home town stories, more mindless and more alike than the slow molasses drippings of four years of sloppy, apolitical, dear-mom war....I did not feel that the right way to end this war was to...chew more fodder about what-beasts-the-Japs-are and Jimmy-looks-skinnier-today."

The U.S. military in Tokyo censored approximately 55,000 words of his dispatches, along with more than 100 photographs.

However, Weller does not refer to governmental censorship of any photographs of his related to Nagasaki.

On January 7, 2009 the Telegraph published Nagasaki photographs dated September 5, 1945: "After we asked readers for stories and photographs relating to Britain at War, we received these fascinating photographs of Nagasaki and Hiroshima from Cecil A. Creber, who took them less than a month [Nagasaki = September 5, 1945] after the atom bombs were dropped on both cities [August 6 and 9 1945]." The Linlithgow Gazette November 28, 2008 "Amazing atomic aftermath pics set for key war archives" features a photo of Creber captioned "Life through a lens: Cecil with his faithful Ensign box camera."

On February 13, 2010 Mainichi published "New color footage of Nagasaki A-bomb devastation shows need for greater research resources" plus a 01/05/2010 Photo Special [film circa September 11, 1945 found at the United States National Archives in Washington D.C. by Professor Burke-Gaffney].

Weller writes these correspondents "looked like yacht passengers who have stopped to buy basketry on an island." He writes that Colonel McCrary "offered to take carbons of my stories and file them when airborne." The reporters under McCrary's leadership were not subject to censorship, making their dispatches especially valuable. Weller writes: "I refused." "How could I close up my atomic laboratory, with the work only half finished?"...and concludes with the explanation that his refusal is because he wanted to write "something free, big and formal....something ample, leisurely and magnificent." [First into Nagasaki page 19-20]

Haugland of The Associated Press states: "We offered Weller a ride back to Tokyo with us,...."[see Haugland infra p. 20] Weller describes a feeling of "hopelessness" about his dispatches because the Kempeitai to whom he claims to have entrusted the stories had "returned to Nagasaki, but they had no message for me."[First into Nagasaki page 21] Weller, although working as a reporter for a daily publication, chose to refuse an offered opportunity either to timely send his Nagasaki dispatches uncensored from the aircraft or alternatively to confront the Occupation censorship directly by filing in Tokyo, despite writing: "I wanted to be prepared to defend every line. If the stories were blocked as reprisal against me, I intended to take the case to MacArthur himself."[First into Nagasaki page 18]

Weller traveled to Nagasaki from Kanoya airbase with Sergeant Gilbert Harrison. Harrison's career later included: Chairman of the American Veterans Committee; editor and publisher of The New Republic magazine; author of several books. In Harrison's memoir [Parts of a Past iUniverse June 2009 pages 81–2] he describes carrying George Weller's Nagasaki reporting from an airstrip outside Nagasaki to the Chicago Daily News in Tokyo:

'You'll be the errand boy,' he[Weller] informed me[Harrison]. The plane we'd met was going on to Tokyo.... ...I picked up my belongings and Weller's copy. He wrote down the name and address of his Daily News associate in Tokyo...and the near-empty plane took off. A bus awaited us at Atsugi airport outside Tokyo and the plane crew and I were driven to the American-occupied Dai-Ichi Hotel....That night I slept between sheets and the following morning delivered Weller's story to the Daily News. As payment, a rowdy evening's entertainment was provided at an establishment catering to thirsty American officers and featuring compliant Japanese girls who were not of the Geisha class.

A Boston Globe article by Gerald R. Thorp of the Chicago Daily News "TOKYO, Sept. 10(CDN) 'New Brand of Jap to Him!'" indicates that Harrison was by September 10, 1945 accompanying correspondents in Tokyo.

The first dispatch presented in First into Nagasaki (see page 25 and photos on cover and back inside endpaper) is datelined Nagasaki September 6 and reads: ..."After a 24-hour trip on what seemed like dozens of trains, the writer arrived here this afternoon as the first visitor from the outside Allied world." On September 6 the Chicago Daily News printed a dispatch under Weller's byline datelined Kanoya, which begins:

The veteran 25th portable hospital, numbering many Chicagoans and downstate Illinoisans, jumped from ships today to become the first American hospital in southern Japan. Every doctor but one is a Rush Medical College graduate. Commanded by tall Maj. Frederic de Peyster] of 445 Cedar St. Winnetka, they include Capt. Hugo Baum, 55 E. Washington st., Chicago, and Capt. Edward Murphy, Dixon, Ill., who comprise a special surgical team, and Capt. Roy Swanson, Leadville, Colo.

The remainder of Weller's dispatch consists of a series of direct quotations from men of this medical corps with names, addresses, and photographs (these last are not from in Japan but are formal military portraits). Samples:

'Tell the boys on the Chicago Daily News fifth floor that the heat here is terrific,' said Corp. Carl Johnson, 4729 N. Avers av., Chicago Daily News composing room employee on leave in service....Corp. Walter Newman, Beloit, Wis., drove past with a box marked 'human blood' and said, 'I've seen it--let's go home.'

After the September 6 dispatch from Kanoya, Weller's next dispatch was printed on September 12 with an "Ōmuta, Kyushu" dateline (Omuta was a prisoner of war camp approximately 100 miles by railroad from Nagasaki and twice that from Kanoya). Headlined "New Saga of Boldness For Wermuth as Captive", it is an account of the famous "One-Man-Army" Captain Arthur W. Wermuth continuing his leadership as a POW on a Hellship carrying prisoners to Japan.

=== Photographs ===
The photograph in First into Nagasaki facing the Introduction by Anthony Weller xv is captioned "George Weller (r.) with Admiral Chester Nimitz on board the U.S.S. Missouri for the treaty signing, Tokyo Bay, September 2, 1945." This caption is incorrect since the figure on the left of the picture is not Fleet Admiral Nimitz, the signer as United States Representative of the proceedings' documents. In all still images and moving pictures of the Japanese surrender ceremony Nimitz is seen wearing Navy cap with full "scrambled eggs" denoting his five-star rank. The personage in the photograph appears to be John Knight, publisher of the Chicago Daily News, who was in attendance on the USS Missouri as a guest of the Secretary of the Navy.

With reference to this photograph supra presented in First into Nagasaki, the Battleship Missouri Memorial at Pearl Harbor: "can confirm that the individual pictured to the left in the photograph is not Fleet Admiral Nimitz." http://www.ussmissouri.org

George Weller was actually photographed with a prominent naval figure Hiram Cassidy[sic] by the Associated Press on March 25, 1943 AP Images ID 4303250106. The picture was taken just before Weller's letter to the Foreign Editor of the Chicago Daily News quoted in Weller's War pp355–6. At left is Commander Hiram Cassedy[correct spelling], then Captain of Searaven, hero of several submarine engagements in the South-west Pacific (Submarine Operations in World War II US Naval Institute Eighth Printing December 1965 pages 104,193-4,233,463). At right is George Weller wearing the British-type tropical uniform of shorts and knee socks. Cassedy (later Admiral) commanding Tigrone went on to lead a submarine group "Hiram's Hecklers" and also to hold the Pacific record for "lifeguard" duty (with 31 rescues; Ibid. pp 471–3).

The Chicago Daily News September 8, 1945 printed prominently two photographs credited 'Associated Press Wirephoto' showing one American foreign correspondent amidst an obliterated surrounding former city. These photographs feature in the background what has become the widely recognized symbol for the atom bombs dropped on Japan, the shell of a pre-war structure which has been preserved as it looked then. Now commonly referred to as "A-Bomb Dome" it is on the UNESCO World Heritage List registered as "Hiroshima Peace Memorial." The CDN 1945 captions read:

1. "An Allied war correspondent looks over the twisted steel and masonry in what was the city of Hiroshima before it was struck by an atomic bomb."
2. "No show tonight. An Allied war correspondent stands in a sea of rubble, looking at the remains of what once was a Hiroshima movie theatre." [Nagasaki photographs (Associated Press: Stanley Troutman; creation date September 13, 1945) in database AP Images (available through libraries).]

Photographs of Nagasaki had already been printed September 1, 1945. Caption: "Nagasaki Today - Japanese workers (foreground) carry away debris in a devastated area of atom-bombed Nagasaki. Smokestacks and a lone building stand in the background. This picture is from Domei, official Jap news agency." Transmission credit is to Associated Press Wirephoto.

Photographs published in First into Nagasaki in 2006 already had appeared in the Chicago Daily News in 1945. [emphasis added]

- Exhibit A: subject: George Weller and Logan Kay; source + locator: First into Nagasaki page 146 (example #1), book jacket front cover (example #2), jacket spine (example #3) = Chicago Daily News October 18, 1945 'Part II - Wake Ghosts' Diary: Navy's Return Raises False Hopes ships shell and leave, so 'Crusoes' give up' Caption: Memento of Terror—Logan "Scotty" Kay, Clearlake Park, Calif., one of the "ghosts" of Wake Island, who hid from the Japs for 77 days, shows George Weller (left) of the Chicago Daily News Foreign Service, a helmet bearing the names of many men who died on Wake and at a prison camp in Japan. /
- Exhibit B: subject: George Weller and James Jordan; source + locator: First into Nagasaki between pages 176 and 177 (14 of 18) = example #1: Chicago Daily News November 20, 1945 'Chapter Ten Death Cruise: Thirst Kills Yanks' Caption: 'He Could Take It—Thirty-three years in the Marines made Sgt.Maj. James J. Jordan (right) tough enough to survive the "cruise of death" to Japan. Here he is telling his story to George Weller of the Daily News Foreign Service. Asked for his home address the veteran said "the Halls of Montezuma, or, for an alternative, "the Shores of Tripoli."' [punctuation sic] example #2: Chicago Daily News April 10, 1964 Caption: 'Correspondent Weller chats with a released PW in camp near Nagasaki in 1945.'

== Newspaper prints of Weller's stories ==
On September 16, 1945, the Los Angeles Times published the front page article "By George Weller Chicago Daily News Foreign Service Nagasaki. (Delayed) U.S. Prisoner Sees A-Bomb Rip Nagasaki." Substantial portions of this article are contained in two dispatches in First into Nagasaki; the First and Fifth. Both these dispatches are part of a group of eight dispatches (pages 25–45) which are described in First into Nagasaki as never published. The article has the sub-headline "Witnesses Describe Parachutes Falling and Searing Blast" and includes Weller's interviews with Captain Farley, POWs Bridgman and King, and Dutch doctor Vink (all in Dispatch #5) and Weller's interview with the Japanese lieutenant, aide to the district's commander (Dispatch #1). The article has the following introductory paragraph: "The following story, delayed by censorship, is an eyewitness account by an American observer of the results of the atomic bomb dropped on Nagasaki and includes the stories of men on the ground who saw the bomb fall."

The Boston Evening Globe on September 15, 1945, published a page one article, "By George Weller Nagasaki", with the headline "American Saw Atom Bomb Hit Nagasaki" using content described as "unpublished" [page 24 First into Nagasaki] and at the end of the article "Continued on Page 2" is the following: "(Copyright, 1945, by the Boston Globe and Chicago Daily News.)". Text from Dispatch #6 and Dispatch #1 is used. Weller's interview with the Japanese lieutenant (Dispatch #1) is used in the Boston Evening Globe article as is Weller's interview with Captain Farley (Dispatch #5), and Weller's interview with Dr. Nakashima (Dispatch #8). Quoted statements by ex-POWs Bridgman and King (Dispatch #5) are in this article, which covers both Japanese and Allied observers' eyewitness accounts of the bomb as well as Dr. Nakashima's description of the bomb's medical symptoms. The Boston article reads: "However, about 70 percent of deaths have been from plain burns." (Dispatch #6). The New York Post on September 15, 1945, published an article by George Weller headlined "U.S. Prisoners Held at Nagasaki Describe Terrors of Atom Blast" using the same line of text as the Boston article (Dispatch #1), death statistics (Dispatch #3) and re-located position of POW camp (Dispatch #4). The New York article includes Weller's interviews with Captain Farley, Dr. Vink, Harold Bridgman, and Fred King (Dispatch #5). The article concludes with the bomb's "peculiar 'disease'" (Dispatch #8).

The Miami Herald on September 18, 1945 published an article "By George Weller Miami Herald-Chicago Daily News Wire" headlined: "American Tells of Being Atomic Bombed". In this article are quotations and statistical data from Dispatch #3 "The known dead number 20,000, Jap police tell me, and they estimate about 4,000 bodies remain to be found" along with "The wounded are estimated to be about twice the number of dead." "Walk in Nagasaki's streets today and you walk in ruins." (Dispatch #1) Also, Captain Farley's eyewitness account (Dispatch #5) is quoted. The interviews with Bridgman and King (Dispatch #5) are included as well as information from Dr. Nakashima (Dispatch #8) and the interview with the Japanese lieutenant, aide to the district commander (Dispatch #1).

George Weller's own response "In hours of walking through these areas I experienced no burns or signs of debilitation." is from Dispatch #3 (First into Nagasaki page 30) which mentions Weller's "nausea" not reported in the Miami Herald article of 1945.

The Miami Herald article incorrectly states atomic POW casualties "Forty-eight were killed instantly and four others died later." while Dispatch #5 states "Forty-eight were wounded, four instantly killed, and four, including Aalders, died." The incorrect POW casualty figures also appear in Weller's Los Angeles Times article of September 16, 1945 and his New York Post article of September 15, 1945, and his article in the Akron Beacon Journal headlined "Yank Saw Atom Bomb Wipe Out Nagasaki" and above that "It Was 'Terrific, White Flash'" September 15, 1945 (this article includes interviews supra from Dispatch#1, Dispatch#5, and Dispatch#8). The Associated Press' Vernon Haugland quotes Dr. Vink "only four of our 200 prisoners were killed"[outright when the bomb exploded; four more died subsequently] in article published widely, including in the New York Times and on September 10, 1945 in the Miami Herald. Thus papers in New York, Boston, Los Angeles, Miami, and Akron all print Weller's incorrect casualty statistics, whilst Dispatch#5 gives correct data, as does the Associated Press in 1945.

Eight Dispatches (pages 25–45) are described in First into Nagasaki as written in Nagasaki September 6–9 with Weller "sending them off to MacArthur's military censors in Tokyo, hopeful that they were being cabled onward to his editors at the Chicago Daily News and thence to a vast American readership via syndication. These dispatches have remained unpublished for sixty years; it appears that the U.S. government destroyed the originals." The fact of publication by the Los Angeles Times, Boston Evening Globe, New York Post, Miami Herald, and Akron Beacon Journal is irreconcilable to George Weller's assertion that: "...I sent 25,000 words by the hands of the obliging kempeitai, the secret police, directly to MacArthur. ... All my dispatches were suppressed. Every one of my 25,000 words was killed by MacArthur's censorship, which went on afterward, month after month."[First into Nagasaki page 313]

Censorship of correspondents reporting from Japan for newspapers outside Japan ended October 6, 1945, continuing only for the Japanese media.

In The Weller Dispatches by Anthony Weller[page 291 First into Nagasaki] is statement that "...the editors cut Weller's cynical closing phrase...." The Chicago Daily News text last line is: "That's how Jap wardens cured decadent Americans, but lost the war." The Miami Herald text last line is: "That's how Japanese wardens cured decadent Americans but lost the war--so it says here in fine print."

On September 18, 1945 the Miami Herald published article by George Weller "Japan Holds Prisoners In Secret" on Chinese prisoners on Kyushu, based on information source Lt. Edward Little (later court-martialled for crimes while a POW. This article has close to identical text with the article included in Weller's War pages 618-9 and there described as: "This dispatch was censored by MacArthur and never published."

The Los Angeles Times on September 29, 1945 printed another article "By George Weller Chicago Daily News Foreign Service Nagasaki September 28 Californians Worked to Death on Dam by Japs." Most of this article printed in the Los Angeles Times is contained in the dispatch dated September 24, 1945 published in First into Nagasaki pages 139-143.

For sixty years Weller's own carbon of these dispatches were presumed lost, until they were discovered by Weller's son, Anthony, six months after George Weller's death.

== Controversies ==
=== Title claim, who was first ===
Weller claims that he was "the first Westerner to enter either of the bombed cities after Japan surrendered" and that "No other correspondent had yet evaded the authorities to reach either Hiroshima or Nagasaki." However, other reports note people entering the city as early as August 22, and the earliest dispatch from Weller was dated September 6 (see below).

Australian journalist Wilfrid Burchett arrived in Hiroshima on September 3, 1945, and a Hiroshima dispatch from him was printed September 5, 1945 in the London Daily Express.

George Weller: "...I entered it [Nagasaki] on September 6, 1945, as the first free westerner to do so after the end of the war." [page 3] "...the writer arrived here [Nagasaki] this afternoon as the first visitor from the outside Allied world." [page 25] "...the writer--the first Allied observer to reach Nagasaki since the surrender--..." [page 43] Anthony Weller: "...no outsider had been in yet, not even from the U.S. military." [pages 245-246]

Weller [Part I First into Nagasaki in the book First into Nagasaki page 3] writes: "Whenever I see the word 'Nagasaki,' a vision arises of the city when I entered it on September 6, 1945, as the first free westerner to do so after the end of the war. No other correspondent had yet evaded the authorities to reach either Hiroshima or Nagasaki."

However, the Chicago Daily News on August 30, 1945 published under size extra large headline: "1st INSIDE STORY OF HIROSHIMA Reporter Tells How City Vanished in Atom Blast" a notable scoop by Leslie Nakashima written for United Press (and also printed in the New York Times "Newsman finds all of Hiroshima gone after atom blow.") Born in Hawaii and previously a reporter for the Honolulu Star-Bulletin and a foreign correspondent with wire agency UP in pre-war Tokyo this Nisei's dispatch includes: "...I arrived at Hiroshima at 5 A.M. Aug. 22, to find out about my mother, who lived in the outskirts of the city. Alighting from the train, I found that Hiroshima station—once one of the largest in western Japan—no longer existed. ...The sight before me as I headed for the outskirts of the city where my mother lived was unbelievable. It was unbelievable because only a fortnight before the bombing I had seen the city intact when I evacuated my wife and two daughters to central Japan. Except for one or two bombs dropped on separate occasions by B-29's, Hiroshima had not been subjected to heavy incendiary attacks. ...But I found my mother safe. She had been weeding grass in a relative's vegetable field about two miles southeast of the city when she saw the flash....A school in the suburbs near mother's home has been converted into a field hospital to care for people who suffered burns. The majority of these cases is believed hopeless. Many of the victims are unidentifiable. Even now two or three patients are dying daily at this one hospital."

And the Chicago Daily News published a dispatch by Associated Press war correspondent Vern Haugland on page one under size large headline: "U.S. Writer Views Hiroshima" Continued dispatch section headline: "First U.S. Reporter Sees Hiroshima Ruins."

Correspondents from the Headliner-Dateliner group with Lt. Col. John 'Tex' McCrary of the Strategic Air Forces visited both Hiroshima (September 4–5) and Nagasaki (September 8–9), publishing a series of thorough and informative dispatches which covered both atomic cities and included medical aspects.

=== Parachutes ===
Several of the eyewitnesses Weller interviewed described seeing a parachute, or parachutes, falling on the day of the bombing. In an account published more than twenty years after his visit to Nagasaki, Weller asserts that the bomb which destroyed Nagasaki was a "lazy-falling missile floating under a parachute.""...riding under a silk handkerchief." [First into Nagasaki page 3] Since the bomb did not descend by parachute (a fact well known twenty years later) this description is incorrect.

Parachutes were attached to instruments were dropped by support-planes during the mission to measure the effects of the blast.

=== pre-atomic raids on Nagasaki ===
In the same 1967 account Weller asserts that Nagasaki, prior to August 9, 1945 "...in the face of all logic, it had been spared so far....Streams of B-29s flowed north and south around it, but this prime target remained mysteriously untouched." Weller offers several theories connected with the supposed sparing of Nagasaki.

Contrary to George Weller's unaccountable assertion that Nagasaki before August 9, 1945 was "mysteriously untouched", Nagasaki had in fact been targeted in August 1945, August 1944, as well as the April 1945 raid which became famous as "The legend of Lieut. Gene Flewellen and his B-29, the Experiment Perilous...a 'one-plane air force.'".

On August 10, 1944, Nagasaki had been bombed by B-29s launched from China against Nagasaki's urban area. The twenty-four attacking bombers unloaded 4 tons of fragmentation bombs and 77 tons of incendiaries on the primary.

There is an element of foreshadowing in the fact that Nagasaki was the first Japanese city to be attacked and firebombed by AAF 'precision' bombers, in view of what the city was to experience almost one year later."

On April 27, 1945, Lieut. Gene Flewellen commanding the B-29 Experiment Perilous was forced by weather to abandon his original target on Kyūshū and, without accompanying aircraft, flew southward down the coast seeking a target of opportunity and bombed the Nagasaki dock area. The absence of anti-aircraft fire indicated that the Japanese were "entirely surprised. The lone B-29 wheeled and headed south. Several hours later the pilot put the huge craft down at Saipan, with ten minutes of gas left in his tanks."

On August 3, 1945 New York Times had carried the front page headline "BOMBERS FIRE GREAT NAGASAKI SHIPYARDS" and a page one story beginning "Nagasaki, one of the three major shipbuilding centers of Japan and ninth port of the empire, was left aflame yesterday, its dockyards smashed and its harbor littered with sunken ships by over 250 planes of General George C. Kenney's Far East Air Force." The article continues with a full description of the air battle over Nagasaki, and the destruction of oil tanks, ships, warehouses and railyard. The raid of August 2, 1945 included Mitchell and Liberator bombers as well as Thunderbolt and Mustang fighter planes. Weller's assertion published in 1967 is not consistent with this prominent, lengthy and detailed New York Times coverage, nor with his own assertion published in 2006 at the end of the very first dispatch datelined Nagasaki (September 6, 1945 2300 hours) that the city had had "one earlier serious raid."
