= George Weller =

American novelist, playwright, and journalist (1907–2002)

George Anthony Weller
- Born: July 13, 1907; Boston, Massachusetts, US
- Died: December 19, 2002 (aged 95); San Felice Circeo, Italy
- Occupations: Journalist; novelist; playwright
- Writing career
- Notable awards: Pulitzer Prize

George Anthony Weller (July 13, 1907 – December 19, 2002) was an American novelist, playwright, and journalist for The New York Times and Chicago Daily News. He won a 1943 Pulitzer Prize as a Daily News war correspondent.

Weller's reports from Nagasaki after its August 1945 nuclear bombing were censored by the U.S. military and not published in full until a book edited by his son in 2006.

== Life and career ==
Weller was born in Boston in 1907 and graduated from the Roxbury Latin School in 1925. He was editorial chairman of The Harvard Crimson as a college student graduated from Harvard in 1929. During his senior year there, he wrote the book and co-wrote the lyrics for the 83rd annual Hasty Pudding Club musical comedy production, Fireman, Save My Child!

He studied acting in Vienna, Austria as the only American member of Max Reinhardt's theater company. Weller was named to the Balkan reporting team of The New York Times, and during the 1930s also published two novels, numerous short stories, and freelance journalism from around Europe.

Weller was married twice, first in 1932 to artist Katherine Deupree (1906–1984) of Cincinnati, with whom he had a daughter Ann. They divorced in 1944, and in 1948 he married reporter Charlotte Ebener (1918–1990): their marriage ended with Charlotte's death.

In 1957, Weller had a second child, Anthony, by the British ballet teacher and scholar Gladys Lasky Weller (1922–1988), with whom he maintained a relationship for over thirty years.

=== World War II ===
In December 1940, soon after the beginning of World War II, Weller began working for the Chicago Daily News Foreign Service and covered the war in Europe, Africa, Asia, and the Pacific as one of the war's great correspondents, winning a 1943 Pulitzer Prize for his work.

He wrote a pamphlet "The Belgian Campaign in Ethiopia" published by the Belgian Information Center as part of its World War II dissemination of information favorable to Belgium and to Belgium's role in the Belgian Congo, a valuable colony then and for many previous decades. This pamphlet is based on 1941 interviews with Belgian officers who led an army consisting of troops who had been local black police in the Belgian Congo, then Belgium's African colony and originally the personal property of King Leopold of Belgium's royal family. The interviews described and celebrated the surrender of Italian General Gazzera and were conducted following the conclusion of the Belgian campaign, a "trek of 2,500 miles through jungle swamps and desert wastes."

Hardships, heroism and aggressive action against a numerically superior Italian force are reflected, as well as the role of the Belgian Congo Army's victory in assisting World War II Allied efforts to oppose the Axis in the colonial sphere. Based on articles first published in the Chicago Daily News, this pamphlet joined such publications as King Leopold Vindicated in the repertoire of the Belgium Information Center. Office of Strategic Services (OSS, predecessor to the Central Intelligence Agency) officers were involved with United States government and military personnel in securing the supply from the Shinkolobwe mine of most of the uranium critical to production of the atomic bombs dropped on Nagasaki and Hiroshima that brought World War II to an end. Anthony Mockler in his definitive work Haile Selassie's War: The Italian-Ethiopian Campaign, 1935–1941 states that "troops from the Belgian Congo had reached their 'theatre of operations'—the Baro Salient—in February 1941".

Weller reported from Singapore in January 1942. At 8:15 a.m. January 31 the British blew a 70-foot gap in the causeway to Johor. On February 15, 1942, British forces in Singapore surrendered to the Japanese. Giles Playfair, then of the Malaya Broadcasting Corporation, in an entry dated January 29 writes: "Outside the bank I met George Weller who told me that he was off to Java this afternoon and bade me a fond farewell." Weller's reports from Singapore would be published the next year in the book Singapore is Silent.

After the atomic bombing of Nagasaki and Japan's occupation by the United States, General Douglas MacArthur placed the city under censors and restrictions. To write about the aftermath of the Nagasaki bombing, Weller snuck away from the occupation troops and impersonated an American colonel in obtain assistance from local Japanese police. Like Wilfred Burchett, who was reporting on Hiroshima, Weller ran into the press junket of Tex McCrary, which had been tasked to generate publicity for the United States Army Air Force, including limited coverage of the atomic bombings. After spending days on the ground in Nagasaki, Weller had in 10,000 words details about the radiation poisoning, still unrecognized at the time, suffered by the survivors. He sent a copy to Tokyo for transmission to the United States. The censors in Tokyo, however, rejected the dispatches.

Weller's War includes articles which were published (wholly or in part) by the Chicago Daily News, The Boston Globe (August 31 and September 1, 1945) and The Daily Telegraph of London (September 1, 1945). Weller's reporting on Nagasaki remains one of his lasting legacies.

=== After World War II ===
Weller headed the Daily News bureau in Rome, and covered the Balkans, Middle East, and Africa. In 1946, he covered the Greek Civil War. He retired in 1975.

Weller's wife Charlotte, herself a newspaper writer, often accompanied him on assignments, including Indonesia and Saudi Arabia.

Weller died at his home in San Felice Circeo, Italy, on December 19, 2002, at the age of 95.

=== Professional honors ===
In 1942 Weller interviewed crew members who witnessed an emergency appendectomy performed on USS Seadragon (SS-194) by Wheeler Bryson Lipes and other non-doctors, partly with a tea strainer and spoons. Weller won the Pulitzer Prize for Reporting for his December 14, 1942, Chicago Daily News story "Doc" Lipes Commandeers a Submarine Officers' Wardroom".

General Douglas MacArthur honored him by conferring a special distinction: "It is a real pleasure to me to award you the Asiatic-Pacific Service Ribbon in view of your long and meritorious services in the Southwest Pacific Area with the forces of this command. You have added luster to the difficult, dangerous and arduous profession of War Correspondent." Weller was also awarded a 1954 George Polk Memorial Award and a Nieman Fellowship at Harvard.

Late in life he received Italy's Premio Internazionale di Giornalismo. He also provided the inspiration for longtime friend Seán Ó Faoláin's 1974 short story Something, Everything, Anything, Nothing.

== Legacy ==
The Notes in the book The Last Train from Hiroshima state: "As it was, Weller's notes were confiscated and classified. Later, his carbon copies were stored and replicated (in edited form) as internal military and Atomic Energy Commission documents—and in time, they became more or less gospel."

In an article published in the Chicago Daily News, Saturday August 14, 1965, Weller stated, "The original notes and the original stories are buried in a family attic in New England."

In the foreword to Weller's final book, First Into Nagasaki, published posthumously in 2006, Walter Cronkite wrote:

This is an important book—important and gripping. For the first time in print we can read the details of the nuclear bombardment of Nagasaki, Japan, as written by the first American reporter on the terrible scene ... [George Weller's] reports, so long delayed but now salvaged by his son, at last have saved our history from the military censorship that would have preferred to have time to sanitize the ghastly details ... Also delayed by MacArthur's censorship were Weller's dispatches from his visits to American prison camps [w]here he uncovered the Japanese military's savage treatment of their American prisoners ... There is so much in this volume that we never knew or have long forgotten. This volume of the last generation's history is an important reminder, a warning to inspire civilian vigilance.

== Published and unpublished works ==
=== Fiction ===
- Weller, George (1933). Not to Eat, Not for Love. New York: Smith & Haas. OCLC 2234457. A novel of undergraduate life at Harvard.
- Weller, George (1936). Clutch and Differential. New York: Random House. OCLC 1836558. A novel of linked short stories of the American panorama.
- Weller, George (1937). The Promised Land. New York: W.W. Norton. OCLC 55181699..
- Weller, George (1949). The Crack in the Column. New York: Random House. OCLC 1746333. A novel of wartime Greece.
- Weller, George (July 1940). "Strip-Tease". The Atlantic Monthly: 50–57. Burlesque show at "the old Willis".
- Weller, George (23 March 1946). "Departure, With Swords and Ashes". The Saturday Evening Post: 22–23, 134–136. Accompanying this short story is a biographical entry titled "Last Man Out". However, the information provided contains no reference to Nagasaki, nor to the prisoner of war camps in Japan although the story is based on events at Omuta (Fukuoka #17 Kyushu).

=== Non-fiction ===
- Weller, George (January 26, 1939). "The Ecstatic Hedy Lamarr". Ken: 69–71.many publicity photos of Lamarr pages 32–40.
- Weller, George (April 1940). "The Passing of the Last Playboy". Esquire.
- Weller, George (1941). The Belgian Campaign in Ethiopia: a trek of 2,500 miles through jungle swamps and desert wastes]. New York: Issued by the Belgian information center. OCLC 1452395. War reporting.
- Weller, George (1943). Singapore is Silent. New York: Harcourt, Brace. OCLC 1398217. Eyewitness account of the fall of Singapore.
- Weller, George (1944). Bases Overseas: an American trusteeship in power. New York: Harcourt, Brace. OCLC 1248297. Political history.
- Weller, George (Winter 1944). "Part One: Foreword, They Climb To Fight". Military Affairs. Luck to the Fighters. 8 (4): 259–296. doi:10.2307/1982298. JSTOR 1982298.
- Weller, George (Spring 1945). "Part Two: The Battle For Java". Military Affairs. Luck to the Fighters. 9 (1): 33–62. doi:10.2307/1982821. JSTOR 1982821.
- Weller, George (Summer 1945). "Part Three: Conclusion". Military Affairs. Luck to the Fighters. 9 (2): 124–150. doi:10.2307/1982865. JSTOR 1982865.
- Weller, George (1958). The Story of the Paratroops. illustrated by W. T. Mars. Eau Claire, Wisconsin: E. M. Hale. OCLC 1742787. For young readers.
- Weller, George (1962). The Story of Submarines. New York: Random House. OCLC 850464. For young readers; later reissued as All About Submarines.
- Weller, George. The General Forgets The Enemy: A Memoir. unpublished manuscript.
- Stenbuck, Jack (1995). Typewriter Battalion: Dramatic front-line dispatches from World War II. New York: W. Morrow. ISBN 978-0-688-14190-5. OCLC 31411136. An anthology containing Weller's "Flight from Java", a 1942 dispatch concerning his escape.
- Weller, George (1999). Oral history appendectomy performed on fourth war patrol of USS Seadragon, 1942. Naval Historical Center. Washington, D.C.: Naval Historical Center. OCLC 43564256.
- Weller, George (2006). Anthony Weller (ed.). First Into Nagasaki: The Censored Eyewitness Dispatches on Post-Atomic Japan and Its Prisoners of War. New York: Crown. ISBN 978-0-307-34201-0. OCLC 67239853.
- Weller, George (2009). Anthony Weller (ed.). Weller's War: A Legendary Foreign Correspondent's Saga of World War II on Five Continents. New York: Crown. ISBN 978-0-307-40655-2.

=== Plays ===
- Walking Time
- Farewell, Ulysses
- Second Saint of Cyprus
- Friendly Relations
- The Impossible Immortals (a comedy in three acts). This play takes place in Italy after World War II, during the years of the rivalry between Santayana and Berenson.
