= Wheeler Bryson Lipes =

American naval officer (1920–2005)

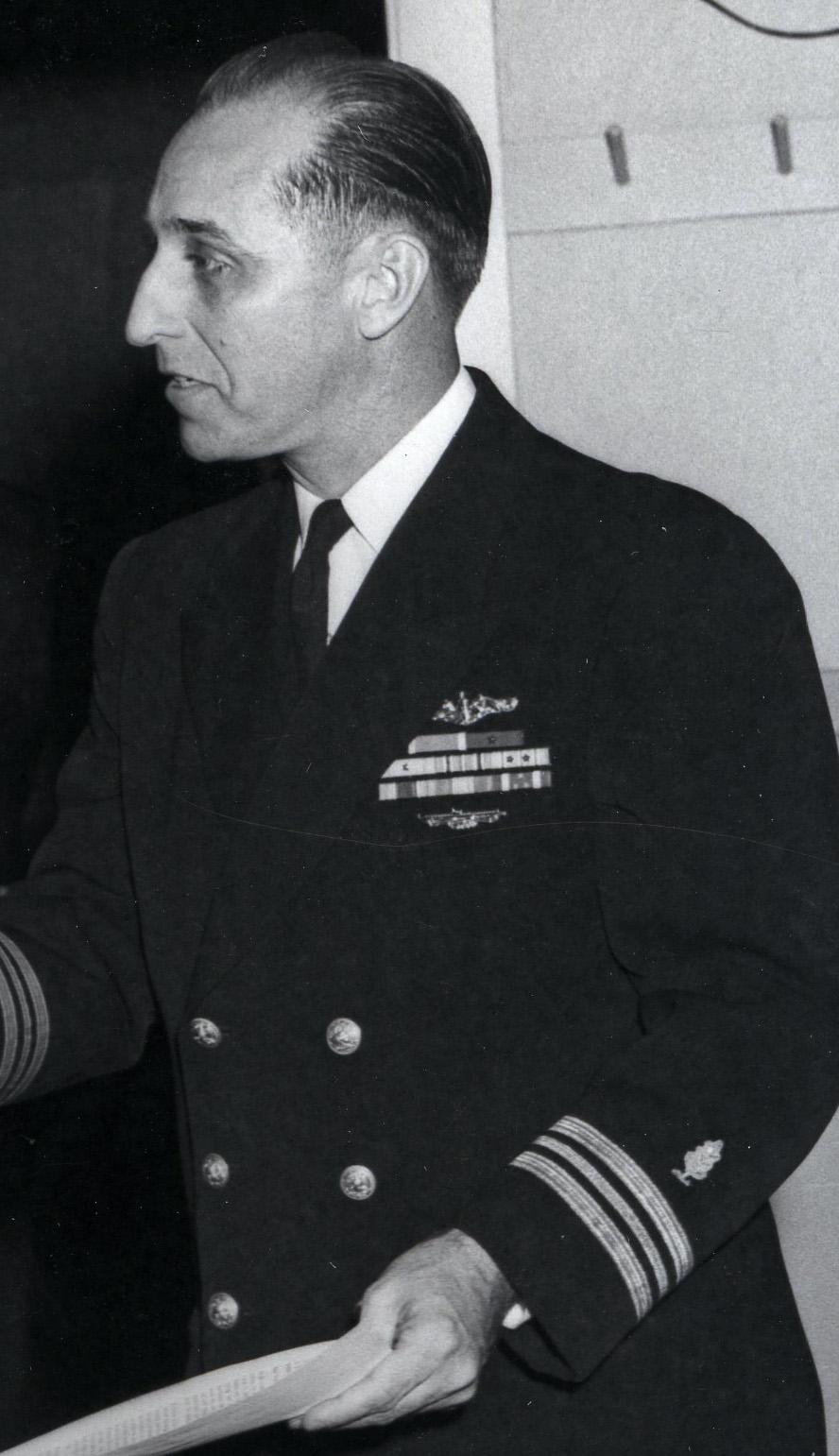
- Lipes in 1962
- Born: July 12, 1920; New Castle, Virginia, U.S.
- Died: April 17, 2005 (aged 84); New Bern, North Carolina, U.S.
- Burial place: Arlington National Cemetery
- Military career
- Allegiance: United States
- Branch: United States Navy
- Service years: 1936–1962
- Rank: Lieutenant commander
- Nicknames: Johnny, Doc
- Service number: 265-73-14
- Awards: Navy Commendation Medal; Purple Heart

Wheeler Bryson Lipes (July 12, 1920 – April 17, 2005) was an officer of the United States Navy. As a pharmacist's mate in September 1942, he performed an emergency appendectomy aboard a submarine. Although he did not have proper medical equipment or formal surgical training, the operation was a success. After the war, Lipes remained in the Navy and later received a Medical Service Corps commission in 1951. He retired as a lieutenant commander.

== Background ==
Lipes was born on July 12, 1920, in New Castle, Virginia. He enlisted in the United States Navy in 1936 and served on the USS Texas (BB-35). (Note: Navy records note an enlistment date of July 12, 1940, which may reflect the start of his medical service.) He began serving on the USS Seadragon (SS-194) on December 10, 1941.

== Emergency surgery ==
In September 1942, while aboard the Seadragon, Lipes performed the first major surgery aboard a submarine when a shipmate (Note: The patient was Darrell Dean Rector; he died in October 1944 in the sinking of the USS Tang (SS-306).) showing symptoms of acute appendicitis required an emergency operation to survive. Positioned in enemy waters and lacking standard medical equipment, Lipes performed a successful appendectomy using kitchen instruments such as spoons and tea strainers. (Note: Lipes was assisted by Norvell G. Ward.) "Doc" Lipes, as he was called, had no formal surgical training and just three years of medical experience as a hospital lab technician at the time of the surgery. The Navy medical establishment was angered by the occurrence, and there was talk of a court-martial.

=== In popular media ===
On December 14, 1942, the Chicago Daily News published an article by George Weller about the surgery. It won the 1943 Pulitzer Prize for Reporting. The events documented in the piece were incorporated into the film Destination Tokyo (1943) starring Cary Grant.

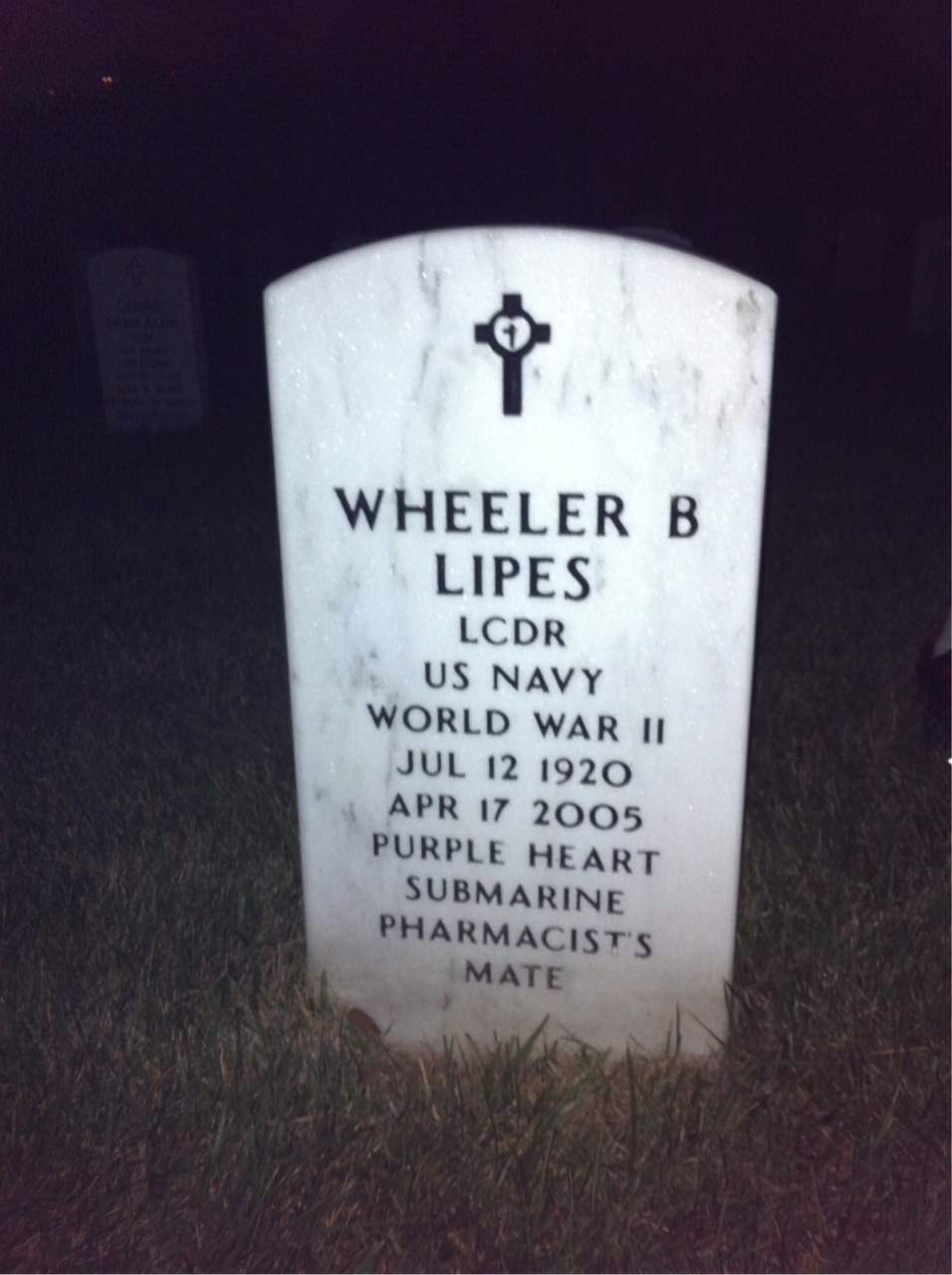
Grave at Arlington National Cemetery

Lipes' heroic surgery was the basis of an episode on Cavalcade of America, a long-running radio series featuring historical dramas. The episode, titled "Pharmacist's Mate, First Class", aired on NBC's main Red Network on May 24, 1943. Michael O'Shea starred as the sailor based on Lipes in a program written by Stuart Hawkins. Lipes made an appearance at the end of the show.

It took a lttle over fifteen years, but Lipes' story finally made it to the small screen via "Operation Seadragon," a second-season installment of the entirely submarine-focused docudrama anthology series, The Silent Service. (Note: Produced by NBC subsidiary California National Productions and focusing specifically on the U.S. Navy's submarine fleet, the series was the brainchild of Rear Admiral Thomas M. Dykers, who also introduced each episode.) Premiering in the fall of 1958, the episode featured soon-to-be famous sitcom straight man Richard Deacon as Lipes.

== Personal life ==
Lipes was married twice, first to Myrtle Peterson from 1939 until her death in 1997; he was married to his second wife, Audrey, at the time of his death.

After his military service, which lasted until 1962, Lipes worked in civilian hospitals; he retired in 1991 as president of Memorial Medical Center in Corpus Christi, Texas. He eventually received official recognition for the submarine surgery over 60 years after the event; in February 2005, he was awarded a Navy Commendation Medal at a ceremony at Camp Lejeune, North Carolina.

Lipes died in April 2005 of pancreatic cancer; he was buried at Arlington National Cemetery, section 64 site 3897.
