= The Very Thought of You (film) =

1944 film by Delmer Daves

- Directed by: Delmer Daves
- Screenplay by: Alvah Bessie; Delmer Daves
- Based on: an original story by Lionel Wiggam
- Produced by: Jerry Wald
- Starring: Dennis Morgan; Eleanor Parker; Dane Clark
- Cinematography: Bert Glennon
- Edited by: Alan Crosland Jr.
- Music by: Franz Waxman
- Distributed by: Warner Bros. Pictures
- Release date: October 20, 1944
- Running time: 99 minutes
- Country: United States
- Language: English
- Budget: $408,000
- Box office: $2,514,000

The Very Thought of You is a 1944 romantic drama film directed by Delmer Daves and starring Dennis Morgan, Eleanor Parker and Dane Clark. The screenplay focuses on a couple who knew each other when he was in college. They meet by chance, fall in love and marry while he is on a short Thanksgiving leave before starting special training. Except for the opening scene on Attu, the on-screen action stays on the homefront, showing how the years of war affect their lives and the lives of their friends, her troubled family, and others.

== Plot ==
After three years at war, two soldiers serving in the Aleutian campaign in "cold storage" on the island of Attu, Army Sergeants Dave (Dennis Morgan) and his buddy "Fixit" (Dane Clark) are sent back to the States. They spend a Thanksgiving pass in Pasadena and visit Dave's alma mater, Caltech, before being transferred elsewhere in the Pacific Theater.

They meet two young women who work in a parachute factory. Cora (Faye Emerson) quickly catches Fixit's eye, while Janet (Eleanor Parker) remembers Dave from school days. Upon realizing that Dave has no family nearby, Janet invites him home for Thanksgiving dinner.

Her family does not treat him kindly. Janet's mother does not approve of getting involved with a military man who's away all the time. One reason for that is Janet's sister Molly (Andrea King), who is married to a sailor but seeing other men behind his back. Janet's brother, classified 4-F, is rude to Dave as well. Only her father and younger sister Ellie make their dinner guest feel welcome. Ellie notices the attraction between Janet and Dave and secretly arranges a date on Thanksgiving morning between Dave and Janet.

A day at Mount Wilson runs long and causes them to be late getting Janet back home, but the couple can't bear to part, so Janet and Dave proceed to Cora's apartment and fall asleep. It is 3 a.m. when he takes her home, where Janet's mother slaps her.

Dave must report for duty in San Diego, but is in love and marries Janet, enjoying a brief honeymoon. Molly disapproves and intercepts Dave's letters to Janet. Janet decides to move out and live in Cora's apartment.

She and Dave (with Fixit's help) have a quick rendezvous in San Diego, sleeping on a beach, because all the hotels and trailer parks are full. Shortly after this, Janet learns she's pregnant, which leads to more acrimony between her and Molly.

When news comes that Dave and Fixit have been wounded in the war, everyone in Janet's family finally relents. Molly even begs husband Fred (William Prince) for forgiveness and they reconcile. It takes months more, but Dave finally returns to rejoin his wife and meet their new baby boy.

== Cast ==
- Dennis Morgan as Sergeant David Stewart
- Eleanor Parker as Janet Wheeler
- Dane Clark as Sergeant "Fixit" Gilman
- Faye Emerson as Cora Colton
- Beulah Bondi as Harriet Wheeler
- Henry Travers as Pop Wheeler
- William Prince as Fred
- Andrea King as Molly Wheeler
- John Alvin as Cal Wheeler
- Marianne O'Brien as Bernice
- Georgia Lee Settle as Ellie Wheeler
- Richard Erdman as Soda Jerk

== Reception ==
According to Warner Bros records the film earned $1,933,000 domestically and $581,000 foreign.
