= The Ravishing Idiot =

The Ravishing Idiot Une Ravissante Idiote
- Promotional poster
- Directed by: Édouard Molinaro
- Written by: (Screenplay); François Billetdoux; André Tabet (Novel); Charles Exbrayat
- Produced by: Michel Ardan
- Starring: Brigitte Bardot; Anthony Perkins
- Cinematography: Andréas Winding
- Edited by: Robert Isnardon; Monique Isnardon
- Music by: Michel Legrand
- Release date: March 13, 1964 (France)
- Running time: 105 min
- Countries: France; Italy
- Language: French
- Box office: 2,186,603 admissions (France)

The Ravishing Idiot (French: Une ravissante idiote) is a 1964 French-Italian Cold War comedy film directed by Édouard Molinaro. François Billetdoux and André Tabet wrote a screenplay based on Charles Exbrayat's 1962 novel of the same name. Brigitte Bardot and Anthony Perkins star as the protagonists in the Franco-Italian production.

The film was also released as Agent 38-24-36 in the United States.

== Plot ==
A Soviet spy (Perkins) is on an official mission to obtain sensitive information from NATO about military mobilization. The klutzy intelligence operative has to rely on the instinct of his new partner and love-interest Penelope Lightfeather (Bardot) as they traipse across the countryside, avoiding counterintelligence agents and distrustful communist operatives.

== Cast ==
- Brigitte Bardot as Penelope Lightfeather
- Anthony Perkins as Harry Compton / Nicholas Maukouline
- Grégoire Aslan as Bagda
- Jean-Marc Tennberg as Cartwright
- Hans Verner as Farington
- Jacques Monod as Surgeon

== Production ==
The film was shot in London and the French countryside. Production was affected for three days after Perkins suffered a sprained ankle while filming chase scenes through the woods with Bardot.

As he was fluent in French, this is one of several French-language roles that Perkins took on.

== Reception ==
Variety called it "uneven".

== Bibliography ==
- Blake, Matt; Deal, David (2004). The Eurospy Guide. Baltimore: Luminary Press. ISBN 1-887664-52-1.
