= Dane Clark =

American film actor (1912–1998)

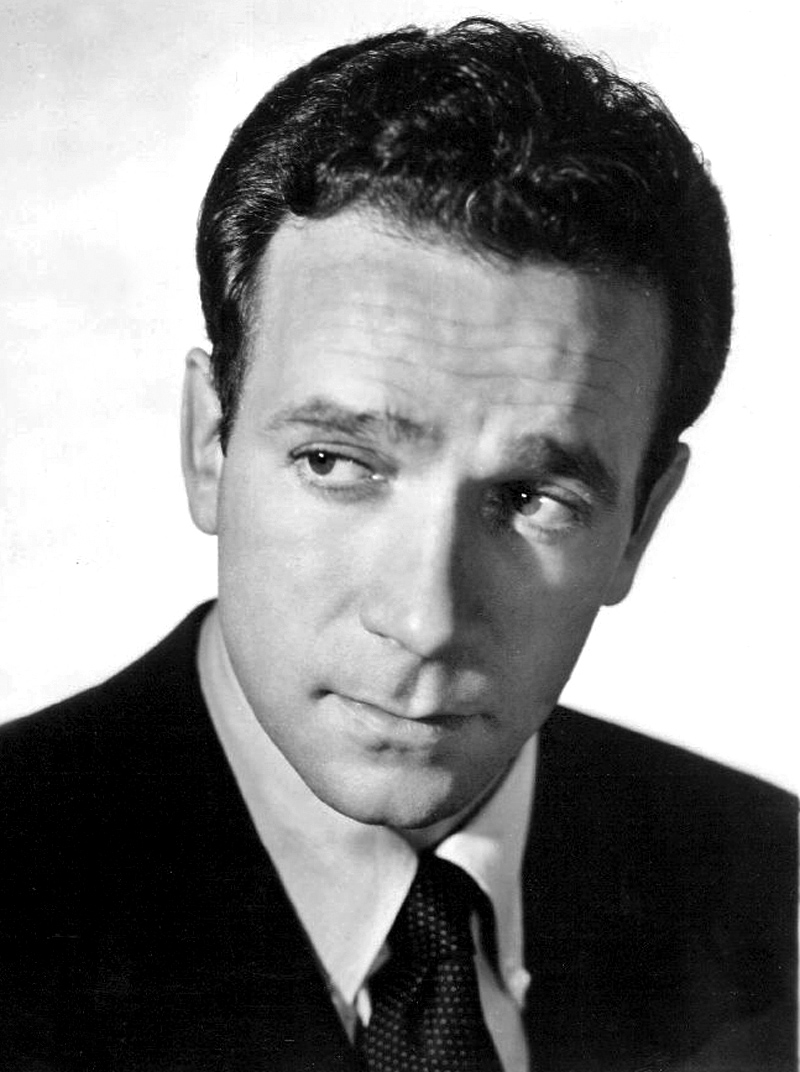
- Clark in 1963
- Born: Bernhardt Zanvilevitz; February 26, 1912; Brooklyn, New York, U.S.
- Died: September 11, 1998 (aged 86); Santa Monica, California, U.S.
- Education: Cornell University; St. John's University School of Law
- Years active: 1935–1989
- Spouses: Margot Yoder (m. 1941; died 1970) Geraldine Frank (m. 1971)

Dane Clark (born Bernhardt Zanvilevitz; February 26, 1912 – September 11, 1998) was an American character actor who was known for playing, as he labeled himself, "Joe Average."

== Early life ==
Clark was born Bernhardt Zanvilevitz (later Bernard Zanville), the son of Samuel, a sporting goods store owner, and his wife Rose. Clark's date of birth is a matter of some dispute among different sources.

He graduated from Cornell University in 1936 and earned a law degree in 1938 at St. John's University School of Law in Brooklyn, New York, which was before its current building was constructed at St. John's campus in Queens. During the Great Depression, he worked as a professional boxer, minor league baseball player, construction worker, and model.

== Acting career ==
Modeling brought him in contact with people in the arts. He gradually perceived them to be snobbish, with their talk of the "theatah" and said he "decided to give it a try ... just to show them anyone could do it."

=== Theatre ===
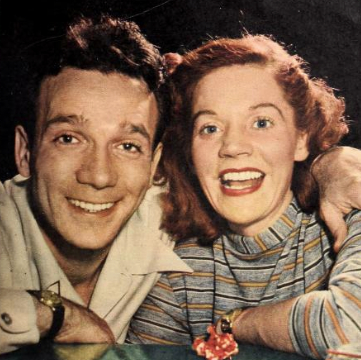
Clark with his wife Margot in 1946

Clark's early acting experience included work with the Group Theatre in New York City. He progressed from small Broadway parts to larger ones, eventually taking over the role of George from Wallace Ford in the 1937 production of Of Mice and Men. His other Broadway credits include Mike Downstairs (1968), A Thousand Clowns (1962), Fragile Fox (1954), The Number (1951), Dead End (1935), Waiting for Lefty (1935), Till the Day I Die (1935), and Panic (1935).

=== Film ===
Clark's first film was The Pride of the Yankees (1942). He had an uncredited bit in The Glass Key (1942) at Paramount.

=== Warner Bros. ===
Clark got his big break when he was signed by Warner Bros. in 1943. He worked alongside some of his era's biggest stars, often in war movies such as Action in the North Atlantic (1943), his breakthrough part, opposite Humphrey Bogart. According to Clark, Bogart gave him his stage name. Hollywood newspaper columnist Louella Parsons wrote in 1942 that Warner Bros. first changed his name to Zane Clark but then decided on Dane Clark because "Too many confused Zane Clark with Jane Clark."

He was third billed in Destination Tokyo (1943) beneath Cary Grant and John Garfield, and in The Very Thought of You (1944) with Dennis Morgan and Eleanor Parker. He had one of the leads in Hollywood Canteen (1944), playing an actual role while most Warners stars made cameo appearances as themselves. Clark had the lead in the 1944 short film I Won't Play with Janis Paige, which received the 1945 Academy Award for Best Short Subject (Two-Reel). Clark supported Morgan in God Is My Co-Pilot (1945) and Garfield in Pride of the Marines (1945).

Exhibitors voted Clark the 16th most popular star at the US box office in 1945. In that same year he had a notable part in an Army Airforce training film, Tail Gunner, which starred actors Ronald Reagan, Burgess Meredith as the main character, Tom Neal and Jonathan Hale.

=== Leading man ===
Clark supported Bette Davis and Glenn Ford in A Stolen Life (1946) and was promoted to top billing for Her Kind of Man (1946), a crime film. He followed it with That Way with Women (1947), Deep Valley (1947), and Embraceable You (1948). Republic Pictures borrowed him to play the lead for Frank Borzage in Moonrise (1948). At Warner Bros., he was in Whiplash (1948). Clark went to United Artists for Without Honor (1948), then back to Warner Bros. for Backfire (1950) and Barricade (1950). He travelled to England to make Highly Dangerous (1950) and France for Gunman in the Streets (1951). Back at Columbia he was in Never Trust a Gambler (1951). He acted in the United Artists Western Fort Defiance (1951). He returned to Britain for The Gambler and the Lady (1952), Murder by Proxy (1954) and Five Days (1955), all for Hammer Films. In the US, he was in Go Man Go (1954) with the Harlem Globetrotters and Toughest Man Alive (1955).

During the 1950s, he became one of a small group of actors (excluding the original 'founding' members brought in at the Studio's inception) awarded life membership in the Actors Studio.

=== Radio, television and later films ===
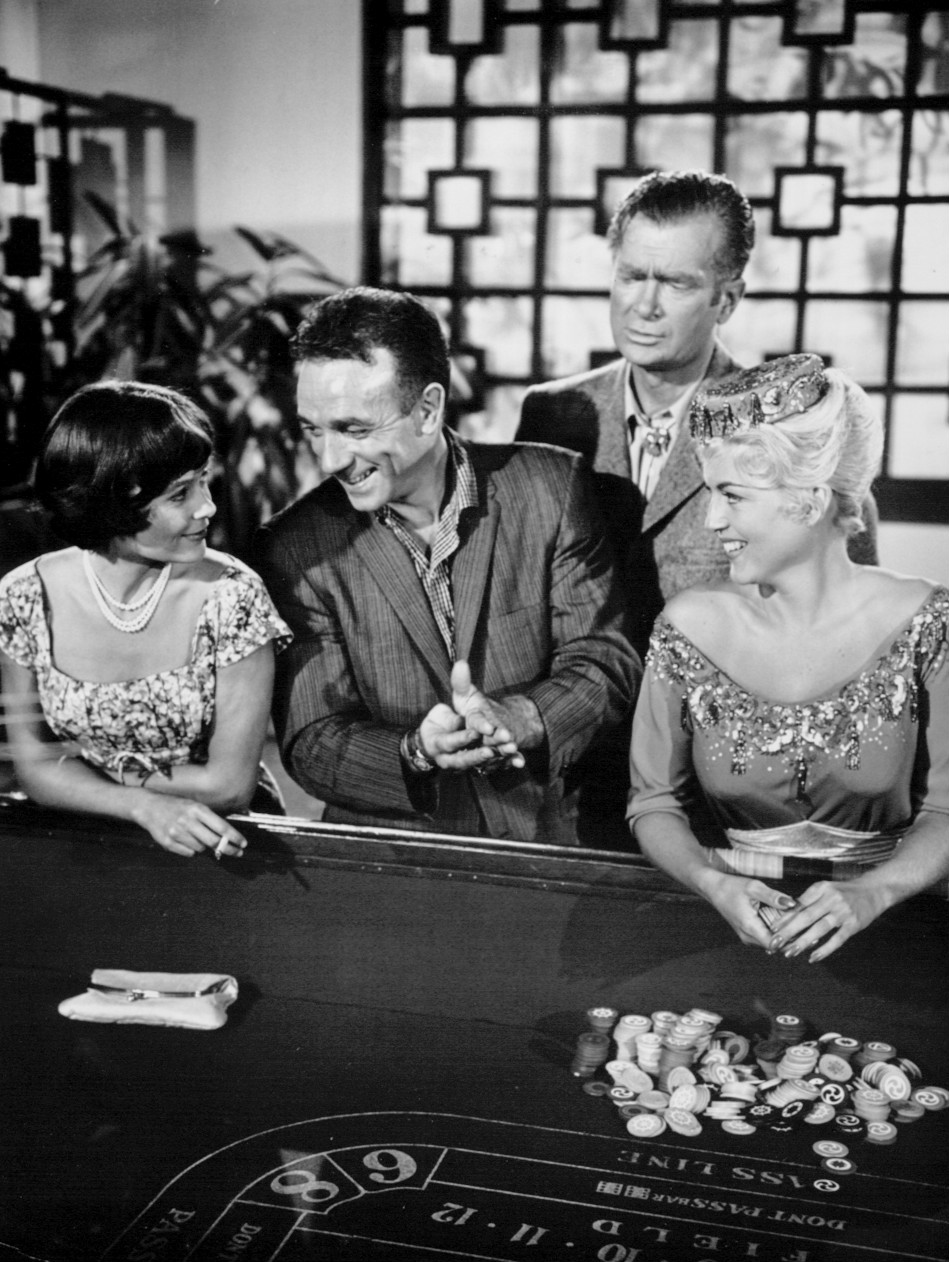
Left to right: Christine White, Dane Clark, Buddy Ebsen and Jane Burgess in "The Prime Mover", a 1961 episode of The Twilight Zone

Clark played Peter Chambers in the short-lived radio program Crime and Peter Chambers, a half-hour show which aired from April 6 to September 7, 1954.

Clark first appeared on television in the late 1940s, and after the mid-1950s worked much more in that medium than in feature films. In the 1954/1955 season, he co-starred as the character Richard Adams in the crime drama Justice.

On July 1, 1955 while starring in the play The Shrike, the lead actress Isabel Bonner, suffered a brain hemorrhage and died. The scene took place in a hospital, and when Isabel Bonner collapsed on a bed, Dane Clark, ad-libbing, put his arm around Bonner and said, "Ann, speak to me. Is something the matter? What's wrong, darling? I love you." Then, realizing something was wrong, he turned to the wings and said "Bring down the curtain." A film editor in the audience, Harold Cornsweet, later said of the ad-libbed scene: "It was so realistic that people in the audience were crying."

He returned to films for The Man Is Armed (1956) and Outlaw's Son (1957).

In 1958 he was a guest star on the television series Wagon Train in "The John Wilbut Story". Clark played John Wilbut, a man who some on the train believe to be John Wilkes Booth on the run from the assassination of Lincoln.

In 1959, he reprised Humphrey Bogart's role as Slate in Bold Venture, a short-lived television series. He also guest starred on a number of television shows, including Faye Emerson's Wonderful Town, Appointment with Adventure, CBS's Rawhide in the episode "Incident of the Night Visitor", and The Twilight Zone, in the episode "The Prime Mover".

In 1970, he guest-starred in an episode of The Silent Force and had a role in The McMasters (1970). That same year he appeared as Barton Ellis on The Men From Shiloh, rebranded name of the long running TV Western series The Virginian in the episode titled "The Mysterious Mrs. Tate." He also played Lieutenant Tragg in the short-lived revival of the Perry Mason television series in 1973, and appeared in the 1976 miniseries Once an Eagle. He also appeared seven times on the cop television show Police Story, always playing a Lieutenant but in different roles.

== Death ==
Clark died on September 11, 1998, of lung cancer at St. John's Hospital in Santa Monica, California. His remains were cremated and his ashes given to his widow.

== Complete filmography ==
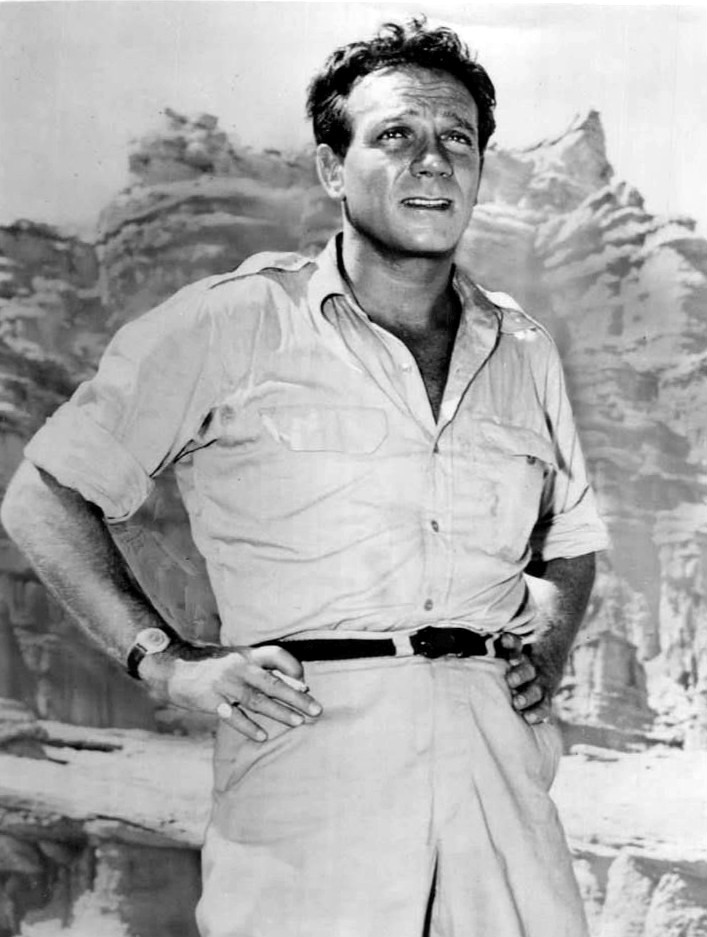
Clark in a 1956 TV episode of Wire Service

- Toils of the Law (1938 short) (as Bernard Zanville)
- Money and the Woman (1940) – (scenes deleted)
- Sunday Punch (1942) – Phil Grogan (uncredited)
- The Pride of the Yankees (1942) – Fraternity Boy (uncredited)
- Wake Island (1942) – 'Sparks' (radioman #1) (uncredited)
- The Glass Key (1942) – Henry Sloss (uncredited)
- Tennessee Johnson (1942) – Wirts (uncredited)
- The Rear Gunner (1943 short) – Benny (as Bernard Zanville)
- Action in the North Atlantic (1943) – Johnnie Pulaski
- Destination Tokyo (1943) – Tin Can
- Over the Wall (1943 short) – Benny Vigo
- The Very Thought of You (1944) – Sgt. 'Fixit' Gilman
- I Won't Play (1944 short) – Joe Fingers
- Hollywood Canteen (1944) – Sgt. Nowland
- God Is My Co-Pilot (1945) – Johnny Petach
- Pride of the Marines (1945) – Lee Diamond
- A Stolen Life (1946) – Karnock
- Her Kind of Man (1946) – Don Corwin
- That Way with Women (1947) – Greg Wilson
- Deep Valley (1947) – Barry Burnette
- Embraceable You (1948) – Eddie Novoc
- Moonrise (1948) – Danny Hawkins
- Whiplash (1948) – Michael Gordon – aka Mike Angelo
- Without Honor (1949) – Bill Bandle
- Backfire (1950) – Ben Arno / Lou Walsh
- Barricade (1950) – Bob Peters
- The Hunted (1950) – Eddy Roback
- Highly Dangerous (1950) – Bill Casey
- Gunman in the Streets (1950) – Eddy Roback
- Never Trust a Gambler (1951) – Steve Garry
- Fort Defiance (1951) – Lead actor as Johnny Tallon - Civil War Vet, Outlaw & Deadly Gunslinger
- The Gambler and the Lady (1952) – Jim Forster
- Go, Man, Go! (1954) – Abe Saperstein
- Murder by Proxy (aka Blackout) (1954) – Casey Morrow
- Five Days (aka Paid to Kill) (1954) – James Nevill
- Thunder Pass (1954) – Captain Dave Storm
- Port of Hell (1954) – Gibson 'Gibb' Pardee
- Toughest Man Alive (1955) – Lee Stevens, posing as Pete Gore
- Massacre (1956) – Capitán Ramón
- The Man Is Armed (1956) – Johnny Morrison
- Outlaw's Son (1957) – Nate Blaine
- The Closing Door (1960 TV movie)
- Dage i min fars hus (aka Days in My Father's House) (1968) – Eddie
- The McMasters (1970) – Spencer
- The Face of Fear (1971 TV movie) – Tamworth
- The Family Rico (1972 TV movie) – Boston Phil
- Say Goodbye, Maggie Cole (1972 TV movie) – Hank Cooper
- Cop on the Beat (1975 TV movie) – Lt. Baker
- Murder on Flight 502 (1975 TV movie) – Ray Garwood
- James Dean (1976 TV movie) – James Whitmore
- The Woman Inside (1981)
- Blood Song (1982) – Sheriff Gibbons
- Last Rites (1988) – Don Carlo

== Partial television credits ==
- Science Fiction Theater (1955, episode 20 "Negative Man")
- Science Fiction Theater (1955, episode 33 "Before the Beginning")
- The Twilight Zone (1961, episode "The Prime Mover") – Ace Larsen
- Dan August (1971, episode "The Meal Ticket") - Sam
- Mission: Impossible (1972, episode "Hit") – Sam Dexter
- The Rookies (1972 Season 1 Episode 2, Dead, Like a Dream)
- Ironside (1969 Goodbye to Yesterday)
- Hawaii Five-O (1975, episode "The Hostage") – Jesse
- Hawaii Five-O (1977, episode "Blood Money Is Hard to Wash") – Victor Jovanko
- Hawaii Five-O (1978, episode "The Pagoda Factor") – Sergeant Riley
- Fantasy Island (1980 TV series season 4) (1980, episode "The Love Doctor; Pleasure Palace; Possessed") - Lieutenant Blainey
- The Fall Guy (1983 Season 2 Episode 21, The Chameleon) - Al Hester
- Murder, She Wrote (1989, episode "The Grand Old Lady") - Mr. Viscard

== Radio appearances ==
Year	Program	Episode/source
1942	Suspense	Tom Cochrane in "The Singing Walls", air date September 2, 1943
1943	Suspense	Walter Bates in "Life Ends at Midnight", air date February 17, 1944
1945	Suspense	Joe Jordan in "This Will Kill You", air date August 23, 1945
1946	The Fifth Horseman	Doomsday
1951	The Big Show	Guest appearance, air date November 25, 1951
1952	Philip Morris Playhouse	The Criminal Code
1953	Broadway Playhouse	The Turning Point
