= The Hunted (1950 film) =

1950 film

- Directed by: Borys Lewin
- Written by: Jacques Companéez; André Tabet
- Produced by: Victor Pahlen
- Starring: Dane Clark; Simone Signoret; Fernand Gravey
- Cinematography: Eugen Schüfftan
- Edited by: Madeleine Bagiau
- Music by: Joe Hajos
- Production companies: Films Sacha Gordine; Films Victor Pahlen
- Distributed by: DisCina
- Release date: 15 November 1950
- Running time: 86 minutes
- Country: France
- Language: French

The Hunted (French: Le traqué) is a 1950 French crime drama film directed by Borys Lewin and starring Dane Clark, Simone Signoret and Fernand Gravey. The film's sets were designed by the art director Paul Bertrand. A separate English-language version Gunman in the Streets was also produced.

== Synopsis ==
An American gangster is on the loose, leading to a manhunt by the French police force.

== Cast ==
- Dane Clark as Eddy Roback
- Simone Signoret as Denise Vernon
- Fernand Gravey as Commissioner Dufresne
- Robert Duke as Frank Clinton
- Michel André as Max Salva
- Fernand Rauzéna as Un agent
- Pierre Gay as Mercier
- Edmond Ardisson as Mattei
- Albert Dinan as Gaston

== Bibliography ==
- Bessy, Maurice & Chirat, Raymond. Histoire du cinéma français: encyclopédie des films, 1940–1950. Pygmalion, 1986
- Prime, Rebecca. Hollywood Exiles in Europe: The Blacklist and Cold War Film Culture. Rutgers University Press, 14 Jan 2014.
