= USS Seadragon (SS-194) =

American Sargo-class submarine

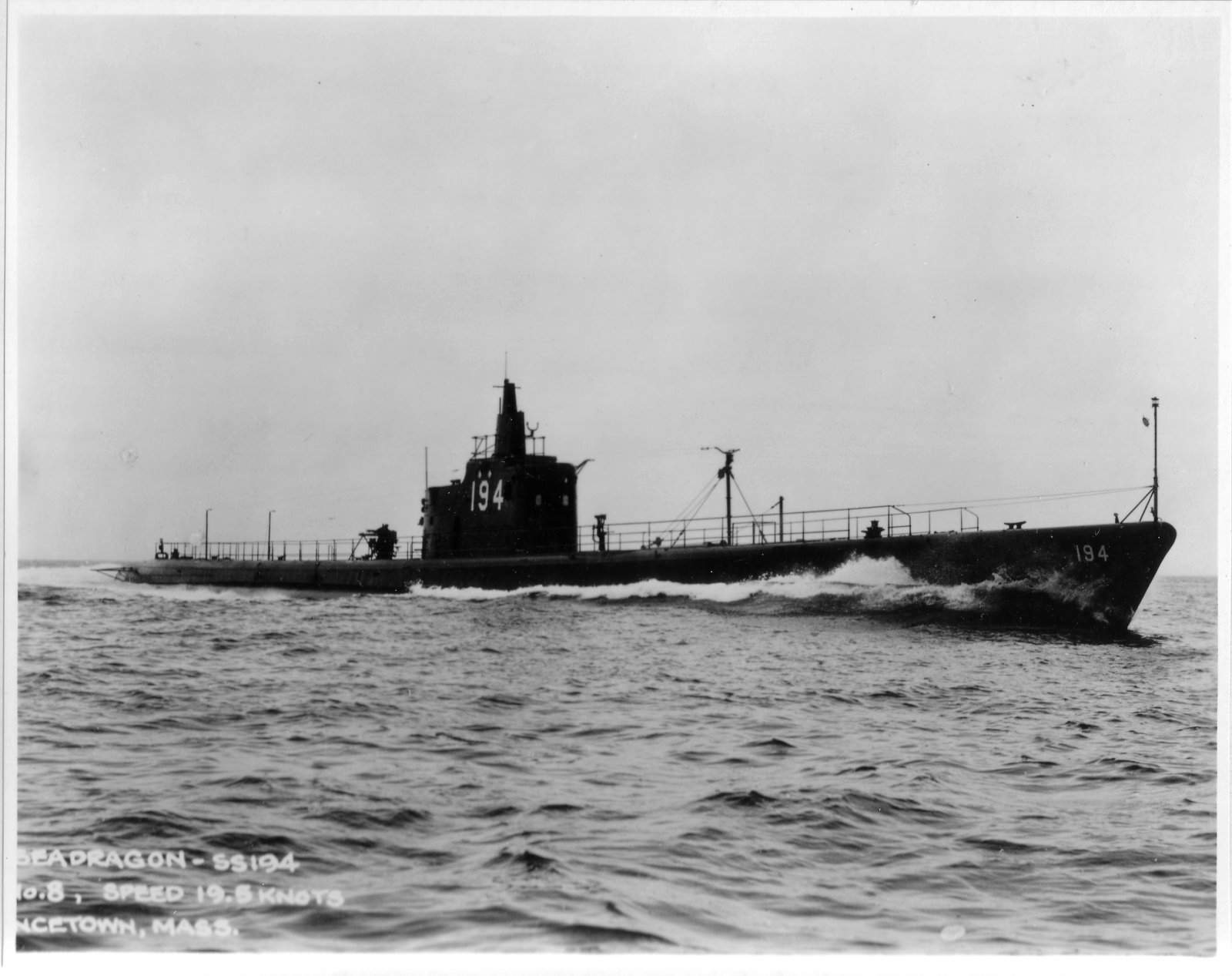
- Seadragon (SS-194) full length, bow view at Provincetown, Mass., 28 August 1939.

History

United States
- Builder: Electric Boat Company, Groton, Connecticut
- Laid down: 18 April 1938
- Launched: 21 April 1939
- Commissioned: 23 October 1939
- Decommissioned: 15 November 1945
- Recommissioned: 8 February 1946
- Decommissioned: 29 October 1946
- Stricken: 30 April 1948
- Fate: Sold for scrap, 2 July 1948

General characteristics
- Class & type: Sargo-class diesel-electric submarine
- Displacement: 1,450 long tons (1,470 t) standard, surfaced; 2,350 long tons (2,390 t) submerged
- Length: 310 ft 6 in (94.64 m)
- Beam: 26 ft 10 in (8.18 m)
- Draft: 16 ft 8 in (5.08 m)
- Propulsion: 4 × Hooven-Owens-Rentschler (H.O.R.) 9-cylinder diesel engines driving electric generators; 2 × 126-cell Sargo batteries; 4 × high-speed General Electric electric motors with reduction gears; two shafts; 5,200 shp (3.9 MW) surfaced; 2,740 shp (2.0 MW) submerged
- Speed: 20.8 knots (39 km/h) surfaced; 8.75 knots (16 km/h) submerged
- Range: 11,000 nautical miles (20,000 km) at 10 knots (19 km/h)
- Endurance: 48 hours at 2 knots (3.7 km/h) submerged
- Test depth: 250 ft (76 m)
- Complement: 5 officers, 54 enlisted
- Armament: 8 × 21 inch (533 mm) torpedo tubes; (four forward, four aft); 24 torpedoes; 1 × 3 in (76 mm) / 50 caliber deck gun; four machine guns

USS Seadragon (SS-194), a Sargo-class submarine, was the first ship of the United States Navy to be named for the leafy seadragon.

== Construction and commissioning ==
Seadragon′s keel was laid on 18 April 1938 by the Electric Boat Company at Groton, Connecticut. She was christened and launched on 21 April 1939, sponsored by Mrs. May F. Richardson, wife of Admiral James O. Richardson, Chief of the Bureau of Navigation, and commissioned on 23 October 1939.

== Operational history ==
Following a shakedown cruise off the United States East Coast and in the Caribbean Sea, Seadragon returned to New England and, on 23 May 1940, departed New London, Connecticut, for the Philippine Islands. With Commander, Submarine Division 17 (ComSubDiv 17) embarked, she arrived at Cavite on 30 November and commenced training operations as a unit of the Asiatic Fleet. A year later, she prepared for overhaul; and, by 8 December 1941 (7 December east of the International Date Line), she had started her yard period at the Cavite Navy Yard.

Two days later, on 10 December, she and sister ship Sealion, moored together, were caught in an enemy air raid against Cavite. Sealion took a direct hit which demolished her and damaged Seadragon. The force of the explosion ripped off part of the latter's bridge. Fragments and splinters punctured her ballast tanks and conning tower, killing one and wounding five. The heat of the explosion scorched her hull and blistered her black paint.

Fires and explosions raged along the wharf. A nearby torpedo shop went up and flames reached toward a lighter, loaded with torpedoes, lying alongside Seadragon. Submarine Rescue Vessel Pigeon, however, disregarded the danger and moved in to tow Seadragon into the channel; she continued into Manila Bay under her own power.

Temporary repairs were accomplished by tender Canopus and Pigeon; and, on the night of 15 December, Seadragon embarked members of the Asiatic Fleet staff. At 00:00, 16 December, she headed out of Manila Bay.

Escorted by destroyer Bulmer, Seadragon moved south, via Surigao and Makassar Straits to Soerabaja, where she disembarked her passengers; received further repairs, exclusive of a paint job; and prepared for her first war patrol.

=== First patrol, December 1941 – February 1942 ===
On 30 December, the submarine departed the Dutch naval base and set a course for the South China Sea to intercept Japanese shipping off the coast of Indochina. On 8 January, she was in the sea lanes to Cam Ranh Bay. Two days later, she sighted a destroyer, launched two torpedoes which missed, then watched as the destroyer continued on its course without attempting to attack the submarine. Seadragon remained in the area. Shortly after noon, a convoy was heard. One-half-hour later, it was sighted, and the submarine began closing the last ship in the column. Shortly after 13:00, she fired; missed; and again tried to close to firing position. Within an hour, however, the convoy was safely into Cam Ranh Bay. Seadragon retired eastward. After dark while on the surface, recharging, she sighted a destroyer and attempted to slip away undetected. The destroyer spotlighted her. Seadragon went deep and worked her way eastward through two depth charge attacks.

She spent the morning of 12 January evading Japanese patrol planes. In the afternoon, she closed a six-ship convoy; but, as she came to periscope depth for a final check, she was spotted from the air. Three salvos of bombs dropped close aboard, but Seadragon went deep and again made her way eastward—this time to investigate the cause of the plane sightings. She surfaced after 18:00. No oil or air leaks were spotted, but her black paint was coming off the entire hull. Red lead undercoating showed from the waterline to the side plating, and, "in spots", on the bow planes and propeller guards. In shallow tropical waters, her original black paint was easily spotted against a light colored background. With red showing, she stood out regardless of the color of the seabed. From then on, Seadragon ran at 140 feet (43 m) between periscope exposures except in areas known to be patrolled by air, when she went to 200 feet (61 m).

On 14 January, she patrolled in the Cape Varella area. On 15 January, she shifted southward, and, on 16 January, she stood off Hon Lon to wait for a convoy. At 11:15, after a periscope observation, she was again spotted and bombed from the air. She returned to Cape Varella where the depth of the water permitted a closer patrol to the shore line.

During the next six days, she sighted several targets but had no luck with her torpedoes. Early on 23 January, she sighted a four-ship convoy which she stalked until daylight, then attacked. At 08:06, she fired at the lead ship and scored with a hit on the port quarter. She then fired two at the ship and missed. The third and fourth ships ran off to the southeast and west respectively. The second ship moved in toward the first; then, listing to port and down by the stern accompanied it as it ran for the beach. Seadragon surfaced and went after the third ship, but the appearance of an enemy plane forced her to break off the attack.

The submarine remained off the Indochina coast for another four days, then set a course back to Luzon. On 29 January, she began patrolling along the coast from Subic Bay to Lingayen Gulf. On 1 February, she took up station off San Fernando and, early on the morning of 2 February, conducted a night submerged attack on a five-ship convoy. Tamagawa Maru (a 6,441-ton transport), the fourth ship in line, went down, depriving the Japanese occupation force of a number of the reinforcement troops and the equipment she carried.

After the sinking, Seadragon patrolled southward. On 4 February, she arrived off Luzon Point; and, that night, she moved into Manila Bay. Mooring at 22:03, she completed loading torpedoes, radio equipment, and submarine spare parts at 03:00 on 5 February. Shortly thereafter, she moved out; rested on the bottom until after dark, then surfaced to take on twenty-five passengers at Corregidor. Among them were seventeen members of the crew at CAST (cryptanalysts and traffic analysts), including the commanding officer, Lieutenant Rudolph Fabian. At 19:46, Seadragon got underway for the Netherlands East Indies.

=== Second patrol, March – April 1942 ===
She arrived at Soerabaja on 13 February. On 21 February, she left for Tjilatjap, whence she was ordered on to Australia. She reached Fremantle on 4 March and two weeks later, again headed for the Indochina coast for her second war patrol. At the end of the month, she was diverted to Cebu to take on fuel and food for Corregidor. She unloaded ten torpedoes and 250 rounds of 3-inch (76 mm) ammunition, and took on thirty tons of food. At 20:53 on 8 April, she moored alongside Pigeon, to which she transferred fuel; offloaded seven tons of food (of the thirty she had taken aboard just for the besieged defenders); took on 23 passengers (including the last seventeen members of the crew at CAST, among them "Honest John" Leitweiler and Rufus Taylor, who as a Japanese language specialist was worth his weight in gold); and, at 21:29, got underway to resume her patrol.

She remained in the waters off southwestern Luzon and recommenced her patrol off the entrance to Subic Bay. On 11 April, she sighted several targets but was able to attack only one, a patrolling destroyer. At 17:20, she launched three torpedoes. Twenty-nine seconds later the first torpedo exploded halfway to the target. The second broached and circled abeam of the target. The destroyer avoided the third. Seadragon changed course and went to 200 feet (61 m) to avoid the circular and the expected depth charging. None of the depth charges were close, but a second destroyer soon joined the first, spotted the submarine as she came up for a periscope observation, and turned on her. Seadragon again went deep, then cleared the area.

On 12 April, the submarine started south. On 20 April, she cleared Lombok Strait; and, on 26 April, she returned to Fremantle.

=== Third patrol, June – August 1942 ===
On her third patrol, 11 June to 2 August 1942, Seadragon returned to the South China Sea. Arriving in her assigned area on 27 June, she patrolled along the Singapore-Hong Kong routes to the end of the month; then shifted to the Cape Varella area. On the morning of 4 July, she launched a torpedo at the leader of a three ship formation. The torpedo missed ahead, all three ships changed course toward Seadragon with the leader proceeding down the torpedo track firing her bow gun. Depth charges were dropped indiscriminately. Ten minutes later, the three had turned toward shore. Seadragon then shifted southward to intercept enemy traffic off Hon Lon Light.

A few hours later, she sighted two freighters and fired tubes 1 and 2 at the lead ship. Her No. 1 tube did not fire, and her No. 2 torpedo missed astern. Two more torpedoes were fired at the ships, but both missed. Enemy planes arrived on the scene soon afterward and for over two hours aerial depth charges in salvos of two and three were dropped. Despite water depth of 75 fathoms (450 ft; 137 m), submarines were visible at any depth against the light colored bottom.

Seadragon survived the close bombing and continued her patrol. During the next week, she attempted to close several ships, but was unable to attain attack positions. On the night of 11 July, her losing streak ended. Just prior to midnight, she sighted smoke and opened out to the westward to overtake the target. At 01:56 on 12 July, she began her approach; and, 14 minutes later, she launched three torpedoes. Two hit, but the third missed astern. A merchantman, Hiyama Maru, began settling. By 02:19, she had been abandoned. Seadragon submerged and resumed her patrol eight miles (13 km) northeast of Cape Varella.

On the morning of 13 July, Seadragon torpedoed and sank her second victim of the patrol. Shinyo Maru was hit approximately 50 feet (15 m) abaft the beam and settled immediately. Seadragon moved out of the area and hunted along the Haina Varella routes for a few days. On 16 July, she was back off Cape Varella; and, soon after 10:30, she fired on a four-ship convoy. Five minutes later, the torpedoes exploded on the beach. The four ships turned toward Seadragon and commenced firing their guns. Seadragon fired two more torpedoes and went deep. A few minutes later, she came to periscope depth. Only three ships remained on the surface. Hakodate Maru had been sunk.

On 20 July, Seadragon departed the South China Sea and made her way south to Australia. On 4 August, she damaged the 6,816 ton Kembu Maru at 07°33′N 161°12′E.

=== Fourth patrol, August – October 1942 ===
On 26 August, she departed her Australian base for her fourth war patrol and again set a course for the coast of Indochina. On 10 September, she moved through Apo East Pass. On 11 September, her progress into the South China Sea was delayed by an emergency appendectomy performed successfully on Seaman Darrell Rector by Pharmacist's Mate Wheeler Bryson Lipes, the first such performed on a submarine. (Note: It was far from the last. So many were done on patrol, in fact, some jokingly suggested all submariners get appendectomies before departure.) This incident was the subject of a Pulitzer Prize-winning account by Chicago Daily News reporter George Weller. In 2005, retired Lt. Cmdr. Lipes was awarded the Navy Commendation Medal for saving a fellow crewman's life. It also was featured in the 1943 Cary Grant movie, Destination Tokyo.

On 12 September, Seadragon arrived on station and commenced patrolling the steamer lanes west of Macclesfield Bank. At dusk on 16 September, she headed for Cape Varella.

Not until 22 September, however, while off Cam Ranh Bay was she able to gain a firing position on a suitable target. On that morning, she launched four torpedoes at a cruiser escorted by two destroyers. No explosions were heard, but her torpedoes were seen, and the enemy ships turned on Seadragon and delivered a "well executed depth charge attack."

A week later, on the night of 29 September, the submarine tracked a five-ship convoy; and, at 0122 on 30 September conducted a surface torpedo attack which damaged one ship. She then ran eastward to attain a position ahead of the convoy but was spotlighted by an escort which had shifted stations. Seadragon went deep; the escort dropped six depth charges and then rejoined the convoy. The submarine surfaced and attempted to make up for lost time. Three hours later, she had overheated her main motor cables and was forced to give up the chase.

On the evening of 3 October, Seadragon departed the South China Sea and, five days later, commenced patrolling the approaches to Balikpapan. On 10 October, she attained a position for a stern tube shot on Shigure Maru. The merchantman disappeared 47 seconds after the first explosion. On 11 October, the submarine patrolled off Cape William and Cape Mandar. On 12 October, she was off Makassar City. On 14 October, she transited Lombok Strait; and, on 20 October, she returned to Fremantle.

=== Fifth patrol, November 1942 – January 1943 ===
Refit was started by submarine tender Holland at Fremantle and completed by tenders Griffin and Fulton at Brisbane. On 23 November, she departed the latter and headed for the Bismarck Archipelago for her fifth war patrol. On 29 November, she entered her area and commenced patrolling the Rabaul-Shortland routes. On 1 December, she closed the New Britain coast to intercept traffic to the Japanese beachhead at Buna, and, during the next ten days, conducted several unsuccessful approaches on enemy formations. On the morning of 11 December, she sighted a freighter with one escort rounding Cape St. George and launched two torpedoes at the merchantman. One hit under the main mast, damaging but not sinking the target. The escort delivered a depth charge attack then took the damaged vessel under tow for Rabaul. Enemy planes prohibited Seadragon from delivering the coup de grace.

On 21 December, Seadragon sighted an enemy submarine near Cape St. George, made her approach, and launched three torpedoes at the target. The first missed ahead. The second exploded about 18 seconds after firing. The third torpedo hit the target. Japanese submarine I-4 sank with her bow vertical and with all hands lost. The second torpedo explosion, however, had damaged Seadragon. The force of the explosion had knocked down the personnel in the forward torpedo room, and the final bow torpedo in No. 1 tube, the outer door of which was open, was forced against the tail buffer. The countermining effect forced the torpedo forward shearing off the guide stud and tripping the starting lever. The outer door could not be closed. Depth control was lost. The final bow torpedo was fired. Control was regained as the torpedo exploded on Seadragon's port quarter at an estimated 200 yards.

On 25 December, Seadragon damaged another cargo ship, and, on 26 December, departed the area for Pearl Harbor where she arrived on 7 January 1943.

From Pearl Harbor, Seadragon continued on to the West Coast, where skipper "Pete" Ferrall was detached to the Bureau of Ships. Between 16 January and 8 April, she underwent overhaul at Mare Island, receiving new batteries and radar and changing the position of her three-inch mount from aft to a forward position. In mid-April, she sailed west again; and, on 9 May, she departed Pearl Harbor for her sixth war patrol.

=== Sixth patrol, May – June 1943 ===
On 15 May, Seadragon (now under Royal L. Rutter, Class of '30) crossed the 180th meridian and moved toward Micronesia. On 19 May, she commenced patrolling in the Caroline Islands. On 20 May, she surprised and was in turn surprised by sighting a surfaced submarine on a parallel course. The other submarine submerged immediately. On 22 May, she took up station off the Truk Islands and for the next 11 days patrolled the sea lanes to the major enemy anchorage enclosed by Dublon, Fefan, and Uman islands. On 4 June, she departed Truk and moved eastward to reconnoiter Ponape, thence proceeded into the Marshall Islands to patrol the sealanes converging on Kwajalein. There, the enemy's omnipresent surface and aerial escorts inhibited hunting, but, on 13 June, Seadragon was able to damage a freighter. Four days later, she cleared the area, and, on 21 June, she arrived at Midway Island, whence she returned to Pearl Harbor for repairs to her steering gear.

=== Seventh–ninth patrols, July 1943 – February 1944 ===
From 18 July to 30 August, Seadragon conducted her seventh war patrol. Of the 44 days, 31 were spent on station near Wake and in the Marshall Islands where increased enemy air activity again hindered hunting and limited Seadragon's score to five freighters damaged. In mid-August, she reconnoitered Wotje; and, at the end of the month, she returned to Pearl Harbor.

On her eighth war patrol, 24 September to 5 November, Seadragon again returned to the Marshall Islands and spent 31 days hunting in the sea lanes to Kwajalein. Again Japanese antisubmarine measures hindered hunting; and, of the five ship contacts made, only two could be developed and only one attack was made. On 13 October, she damaged an enemy transport.

Seadragon's ninth war patrol, 14 December 1943 to 5 February 1944, took her back to the Caroline Islands where she hunted enemy shipping on the Truk-Saipan route and damaged two, possibly three, enemy cargo ships.

=== Tenth patrol, April – May 1944 ===
Refit brought the replacement of Seadragon's three-inch deck gun with a four-inch gun, and, on 1 April, she cleared Pearl Harbor for the Japanese home islands for her tenth war patrol, with James H. Ashley, Jr. (Class of '34), in command. On 5 April, she crossed the International Date Line. On 15 April, she entered Japanese waters. On 16 April, she moved past O Shima, and, that night, commenced patrolling off the Bungo Strait and Kii Channel entrances to the Inland Sea. On the morning of 23 April, she sighted four freighters, escorted by three patrol boats, moving toward Shiono Misaki. She closed the convoy; fired on the third ship, the heaviest laden; then went deep and rigged for depth charging. The patrol boats moved toward Seadragon as Daiju Maru sank and, during the next two hours, delivered a 40 depth charge attack. Later that day, the submarine conducted an unsuccessful attack on a naval auxiliary; and, on 26 April, she moved out into the Tokyo-Manila shipping lanes where she damaged a freighter on 27 April.

On 28 April, she commenced patrolling the Nagoya-Saipan route. In May, she took station off the entrance to Sugura Wan and, on 3 May, shifted to the Tokyo-Guam-Saipan-Truk sea lanes. Two days later, she hunted enemy traffic at the entrance to Sagami Wan. On 13 May, she headed for Midway Island. On 17 May, she caught an armed trawler in a surface attack; set it afire with four-inch gun salvos, then closed the target to take off the uniformed enemy crew. The surviving crew members refused to surrender, and Seadragon continued eastward. On 21 May, she crossed the 180th meridian and stopped at Midway, then got underway for Pearl Harbor, arriving on 25 May.

=== Eleventh patrol, September – November 1944 ===
Re-engined at Mare Island during the summer, Seadragon returned to Pearl Harbor on 7 September and departed on her 11th war patrol, a coordinated patrol ("wolfpack") with submarines USS Shark and USS Blackfish, on 23 September. She arrived at Saipan to top off on 3 October. On 4 October, Shark and Blackfish continued on to the wolfpack's assigned area in the northern China Sea. Seadragon, delayed by the need for repairs, did not depart until 5 October. On 9 October, she arrived off Batan Island, established contact with Shark and Blackfish, and took position in a scouting line in the pack's assigned area.

On the night of 21 October and the morning of 22 October, the group went after an enemy warship formation led by an aircraft carrier. At 06:15 on 24 October, Shark reported a contact, and Seadragon headed for the scene. At 07:30, the contact was sighted through the high periscope, but it proved too distant. At 09:20, Seadragon sighted three enemy merchantmen in a loose column with a torpedo boat destroyer and an airplane as escorts. At 10:55, she launched four torpedoes at the lead freighter.

The first torpedo broached and ran erratic, alerting the escort which started for Seadragon. Seadragon rigged for depth charging. Soon thereafter, two torpedo explosions were heard, and, at 11:01, the first of eight depth charges was dropped. At 11:54, Seadragon went to periscope depth. The escort was milling around picking up survivors four miles (6.4 km) astern. The remaining merchant ships were ahead of the submarine and making only two or three knots. As Seadragon prepared to fire again, the destroyer rejoined the formation. At 11:14, Seadragon fired four more torpedoes. Three hits were observed. The submarine's second target of the day sank in less than two minutes.

Seadragon went deep. Fifteen depth charges followed. At 13:10, the submarine returned to periscope depth. The deck of the sole remaining freighter was crowded. The freighter was smoking heavily and moving slowly. The escort circled the freighter. At 14:04, Seadragon fired. The first torpedo tore off the freighter's bow. The rest of the ship went under quickly. At 14:05, the first of 25 depth charges was dropped.

Postwar examination of Japanese records identified the sunken ships as the cargo ship, Eiko Maru, and the passenger-cargo ships Taiten Maru and Kokuryu Maru.

At 18:58, Seadragon tried unsuccessfully to raise Shark. She had been sunk after attacking the contact of her 06:15 transmission.

On 26 October, Seadragon headed toward Luzon. On 27 and 28 October, she searched for downed aviators; and, on 29 October, she was ordered to return to Midway.

=== Twelfth patrol, December 1944 – January 1945 ===
Arriving at her destination on 8 November, she commenced refit; and, on 3 December, she headed west for her 12th war patrol. The patrol took her back into Japanese waters where she hunted enemy shipping and searched for downed aviators into January 1945. On 10 January, she moved into the Bonin Islands, where she continued those two roles. On 19 January, she set a southerly course; and, on 22 January, she arrived at Guam to complete her last war patrol.

The next day, Seadragon continued on to Pearl Harbor, and, after refit, returned to California to provide training services to naval air units. In May, she was transferred back to the Atlantic Fleet and for the final months of the war, provided training services at Guantanamo Bay and Key West, Florida. In September, she moved north to New London, Connecticut, thence to Boston, Massachusetts, where she was decommissioned on 15 November 1945. Less than four months later, on 8 February 1946, she was recommissioned to assist in the inactivation and preservation of submarines, including U-boats, at Hingham, Massachusetts. On 29 October 1946, she was again decommissioned and berthed as a unit of the Atlantic Reserve Fleet where she remained until stricken from the Naval Vessel Register on 30 April 1948. Seadragon was sold for scrap in early July 1948.

== Awards ==
- Asiatic-Pacific Campaign Medal with 11 battle stars for World War II service

Seadragon was credited with sinking 10 Japanese ships with a displacement of 43,450 tons during World War II.
