= I Won't Play =

1944 film

- Directed by: Crane Wilbur
- Written by: Laurence Schwab; James Bloodworth
- Produced by: Gordon Hollingshead
- Starring: Dane Clark; Janis Paige
- Cinematography: Carl E. Guthrie
- Edited by: Harold McLernon
- Distributed by: Warner Bros.
- Release date: November 11, 1944
- Running time: 18 minutes
- Country: United States
- Language: English

I Won't Play is a 1944 American short drama film directed by Crane Wilbur. It won an Oscar at the 17th Academy Awards in 1945 for Best Short Subject (Two-Reel).

== Cast ==
- Dane Clark as Joe Fingers
- Janis Paige as Kim Karol / Sally
- Warren Douglas as Rusty aka 'Handsome'
- Robert Shayne as Chaplain aka 'Padre'
- William Haade as Chicago
- William 'Billy' Benedict as Florida (as William Benedict)
- Milton Kibbee as U.S.O. Show Emcee (uncredited)
- Knox Manning as Narrator (uncredited)
