= Outlaw's Son =

1957 film by Lesley Selander

- Theatrical release poster
- Directed by: Lesley Selander
- Screenplay by: Richard Alan Simmons
- Based on: Gambling Man by Clifton Adams
- Produced by: Howard W. Koch
- Starring: Dane Clark; Ben Cooper; Lori Nelson; Ellen Drew; Charles Watts; Cecile Rogers; Joseph Stafford
- Cinematography: William Margulies
- Edited by: John F. Schreyer
- Music by: Les Baxter
- Production companies: Schenck-Koch Productions; Bel-Air Productions
- Distributed by: United Artists
- Release date: July 1957
- Running time: 88 minutes
- Country: United States
- Language: English

Outlaw's Son is a 1957 American Western film directed by Lesley Selander and written by Richard Alan Simmons. The film stars Dane Clark, Ben Cooper, Lori Nelson, Ellen Drew, Charles Watts, Cecile Rogers and Joseph Stafford. The film was released in July 1957, by United Artists.

== Plot ==
Twelve-year-old Jeff Blaine lives in the small western town of Plainsville, where he is being reared by his aunt, Ruth Sewall, who operates a tinsmith business. Jeff's mother died when he was four months old, and his father, Nate, left shortly thereafter and became an outlaw. One day, Nate returns and tells Ruth that he has recently been involved in a gunfight. Realising that his days may be numbered, he asks to see his son again. After Jeff rejects Nate as his father, Ruth, who does not welcome Nate's visit, returns the small amount of money he has sent for Jeff's support and asks him to leave the next morning.

In town, when Nate meets old friend Marshal Elec Blessingham in the saloon, Elec chooses to ignore the fact that Nate is a wanted outlaw. The next day, unknown to Ruth, Nate ingratiates himself with Jeff by showing him how to shoot his Colt 44. Later, Ruth reluctantly agrees that Nate can stay a few more days. Soon, Jeff is calling Nate "Paw," but runs into trouble at school when another boy, Ben Jorgenson, says that Jeff's father is a murderer. Jeff tells Ben to get his father's gun and meet him later. Instead, Ben brings his father, who beats Jeff, who is wearing Nate's gun. Nate, Elec and Ruth arrive soon after and after Nate slugs Jorgenson, Ruth blames Nate for involving Jeff with guns and swears she will kill him if he returns again.

Later, when Ruth comes to town to obtain some medicine for Jeff, Nate tells her that he is leaving and intends to take Jeff with him. Soon after, two former associates of Nate, Bill Somerson and Ed Wyatt, rob the Plainsville bank and kill the manager. Ruth, the sole witness to the robbery, lies to Elec that Nate was the perpetrator in order to prevent him from taking Jeff. Nate is arrested, and when Jeff visits him in jail, Nate, believing now that his son is better off without him, lets Jeff believe that he is guilty. Outwitting a deputy, Nate escapes from jail and rides away.

Ten years pass, and Jeff is still living with Ruth and is now working as a security agent for the stagecoach line, but is embittered by the town's ostracism of him. Jeff is courting two young women, the prim Amy Wentworth and the more adventurous Lila Costain, who runs a ranch she inherited from her father. When Jeff assists Elec and a posse in foiling a stagecoach robbery, they shoot three of the robbers, including Ed Wyatt. As he dies, Wyatt recognises Jeff as Nate's son and tells him and Elec that he and Somerson committed the bank robbery, not Nate.

After Jeff confronts Ruth with the truth about the robbery, she admits that she lied to prevent Nate from taking him away because she wanted Jeff to grow up to be happy and decent. Jeff then leaves Ruth's house and decides to find Nate. Although Lila tries to dissuade Jeff and asks him to stay with her, he is obsessed with joining his father, who has continued his criminal career, in exacting revenge against the townspeople. Somerson contacts Jeff with a proposal that they and two others set up a payroll robbery based upon Jeff's knowledge of the stage line's operations.

Later, Nate visits Ruth and reveals that he never told Jeff that she had lied because he wanted the boy to stay with her. While Nate is at the house, Jeff enters with Lila, and Nate informs him that he has heard about the intended robbery and forbids him to participate. In the ensuing fistfight, Jeff beats up Nate and rides off. Nate then begs Elec to help him prevent the robbery.

When Nate and Elec thwart the holdup, Somerson and another gunman take Jeff hostage, blaming him for Nate and Elec's intervention, and flee on the stage. Nate rides after them and, as Jeff and Somerson struggle inside the coach for possession of a gun, Nate shoots the outlaw driver. Nate then jumps on board, taking over the reins of the runaway stage, but is attacked by Somerson who has knocked out Jeff. Somerson overpowers Nate and brings the stage to a halt, intending to shoot Elec and the others who are following. Nate prevents Somerson from shooting by jumping on him from the stagecoach but is in turn shot by the outlaw. Nate, using his waning strength, throws a knife into Somerson, killing him.

Later, as Nate dies in Ruth's house, Jeff tells him that he intends to change his ways, and Ruth agrees to help Jeff once more. Lila then comforts Jeff for the loss of his father.

== Cast ==
- Dane Clark as Nate Blaine
- Ben Cooper as Jeff Blaine
- Lori Nelson as Lila Costain
- Ellen Drew as Ruth Sewall
- Charles Watts as Marshal Elec Blessingham
- Cecile Rogers as Amy Wentworth
- Joseph Stafford as Jeff Blaine as a Child
- Eddie Foy III as Tod Wentworth
- John Pickard as Ed Wyatt
- Robert Knapp as Deputy Marshal Raph Striker
- Les Mitchel as Bill Somerson
- Guy Prescott as Phil Costain
- George Pembroke as Paul Wentworth
- Jeff Daley as Ridley
- Wendy Stuart as Lila Costain as a Child
- Ahna Capri as Amy Wentworth as a Child
- James Parnell as Jorgensen
- Scott Peters as Randall
- Buddy Hart as Todd Wentworth as a Child
- Ernest Dotson as Ben Jorgenson
- Ken Christy as Mac Butler
- Audley Anderson as Egstrom
- Leslie Kimmell as Kessler
