= Destination Tokyo =

1943 film directed by Delmer Daves

- Theatrical release poster
- Directed by: Delmer Daves
- Screenplay by: Delmer Daves; Albert Maltz (Note: Maltz was later brought before the House Committee on Un-American Activities on the grounds that some of the dialogue in Destination Tokyo reflected Communist sympathies.)
- Story by: Steve Fisher
- Produced by: Jerry Wald; Jack L. Warner
- Starring: Cary Grant; John Garfield
- Cinematography: Bert Glennon
- Edited by: Christian Nyby; Vladimir Barjansky
- Music by: Franz Waxman; William Lava
- Production company: Warner Bros. Pictures
- Distributed by: Warner Bros. Pictures
- Release dates: December 15, 1943 (Pittsburgh, premiere)
- Running time: 131 or 135 minutes
- Country: United States
- Language: English
- Budget: $1,516,000
- Box office: $4,544,000

Destination Tokyo is a 1943 black and white American submarine war film. The film was directed by Delmer Daves in his directorial debut, and the screenplay was written by Daves and Albert Maltz, based on an original story by former submariner Steve Fisher. The film stars Cary Grant and John Garfield and features Dane Clark, Robert Hutton, and Warner Anderson, along with John Ridgely, Alan Hale Sr. and William Prince.

Destination Tokyo has been called "the granddaddy of submarine films like Run Silent, Run Deep (1958), Das Boot (1981), and U-571 (2000)".

Produced during the height of World War II, the film was used as propaganda to boost morale back home and to entice young men to join the Submarine Service of the U.S. Navy.

== Plot ==
On Christmas Eve, the submarine USS Copperfin, under the command of Captain Cassidy, departs Mare Island Naval Shipyard on a secret mission to the Aleutian Islands where they take meteorologist Lieutenant Raymond aboard. Their orders are to proceed to Tokyo Bay to obtain vital weather intelligence for the upcoming Doolittle Raid. As they cross the Pacific the Copperfin shoots down two attacking two Japanese floatplanes. Attempting to rescue one of the downed airmen, Mike is stabbed to death. Tommy Adams kills the Japanese pilot, but blames his slow reaction for Mike's death. Tommy volunteers to defuse an unexploded bomb stuck under the deck under the direction of Captain Cassidy.

Greek-American "Tin Can" does not attend Mike's burial at sea, angering the other men until he explains that every Allied death causes him great pain. Raymond, who lived in Japan, discusses how the Japanese people were led into the war by the military faction. Nearing Tokyo Bay, Copperfin negotiates defensive minefields and anti-torpedo nets, then follows a Japanese ship. Inside the bay a three-man party, including resourceful womanizer "Wolf", goes ashore under cover of darkness to make weather observations. Tommy is diagnosed with appendicitis and "Pills", the pharmacist's mate, operates following instructions from a book, using improvised instruments and without sufficient ether. The operation is successful, and "Cookie" Wainwright begins to prepare the pumpkin pie he had promised to bake for Tommy.

Raymond broadcasts the information the shore party has collected in Japanese in an attempt to avoid detection, but the Japanese are not fooled and search the bay. Copperfin remains undetected and the men watch part of the Doolittle Raid through the periscope. After recovering Raymond and his team the submarine slips out of the bay behind an exiting ship the anti-submarine nets are opened for. Copperfin sinks a Japanese aircraft carrier and is badly damaged by its escorts. In desperation, after long barrages of depth charges, Cassidy sinks a destroyer, enabling the crew to return safely home.

== Cast ==
- Cary Grant as Captain Cassidy
- John Garfield as "Wolf"
- Alan Hale, Sr. as "Cookie" Wainwright
- John Ridgely as meteorologist Lt. Raymond
- Dane Clark as "Tin Can" (Leos Theofilos Karafias Jr)
- Warner Anderson as Executive Officer
- William Prince as "Pills"
- Robert Hutton as Tommy Adams (first credited screen role)
- Tom Tully as Mike
- Faye Emerson as Mrs. Cassidy
- Peter Whitney as Dakota
- Eleanor Parker as Mike's wife on record (voice only)
- Warren Douglas as Diving officer
- John Forsythe as "Sparks" Reynolds
- John Alvin as Sonar Operator
- Bill Kennedy as Gunnery Officer
- Ralph McColm as Ensign
- William Challee as Quartermaster
- Whit Bissell as Yoyo
- Mark Stevens as Admirals's aide
- Jack Mower as Admiral's aide
- John Whitney as Communication Officer
- George Lloyd as Chief of the Boat
- Maurice Murphy as Toscanini

== Production ==
Production on Destination Tokyo began on June 21, 1943, and continued through September 4 of that year. Members of the cast spent time at the U.S. Navy's Mare Island Naval Shipyard in Vallejo, California, to familiarize themselves with submarine procedures and operations. Technical advisors to the film included the captain of the USS Wahoo, Dudley Walker Morton, and crewmember Andy Lennox. The Wahoo was reported as missing in action after production on Destination Tokyo completed, sunk by Japanese aircraft in October 1943 while returning home from a patrol in the Sea of Japan. Commander Morton and all aboard were lost. Thanks to the efforts of the Wahoo Project Group, the wreckage was identified in 2006.

The existence of a submarine in Tokyo Bay relaying information to the Doolittle Raid is mentioned in the film Thirty Seconds Over Tokyo (1944), based on pilot Ted Lawson's memoir. There is a scene on the USS Hornet where Lawson (Van Johnson), fresh from a briefing on the latest positions of the barrage balloons over Tokyo, tells his friend Bob Gray (Robert Mitchum): "You know, the changes in those balloons threw me. Just think, a bunch of guys sweating all day in a sub down in Tokyo Bay, guys just like us, sneaking up at night to radio balloon positions..." The existence of such a submarine is not part of the participants' or historians' accounts of the raid. The Doolittle Raiders detailed description of the raid states that the barrage balloons seen on the raid were a negligible threat. There were many other possible intelligence sources for information given out at the briefings.

The model of the Copperfin used for filming was based on actual American submarines, except that, to confuse the Japanese, it was given equipment and apparatus that were used on numerous different types of subs. The film was accurate enough to be used by the Navy as a training tool for submariners.

The incident in Destination Tokyo in which the pharmacist's mate performs an appendectomy was based on an actual event which took place on the submarine USS Seadragon. The real-life appendectomy was performed by Wheeler Bryson Lipes.

Some filming of Destination Tokyo took place at Portuguese Bend on the Palos Verdes Peninsula.

For Destination Tokyo, Warner Bros. Pictures borrowed Cary Grant from Columbia Pictures in a swap which sent Humphrey Bogart to Columbia to make Sahara. Grant had turned down the role that Bogart eventually played, and Gary Cooper had turned down the role of the captain of the Copperfin that Grant played.

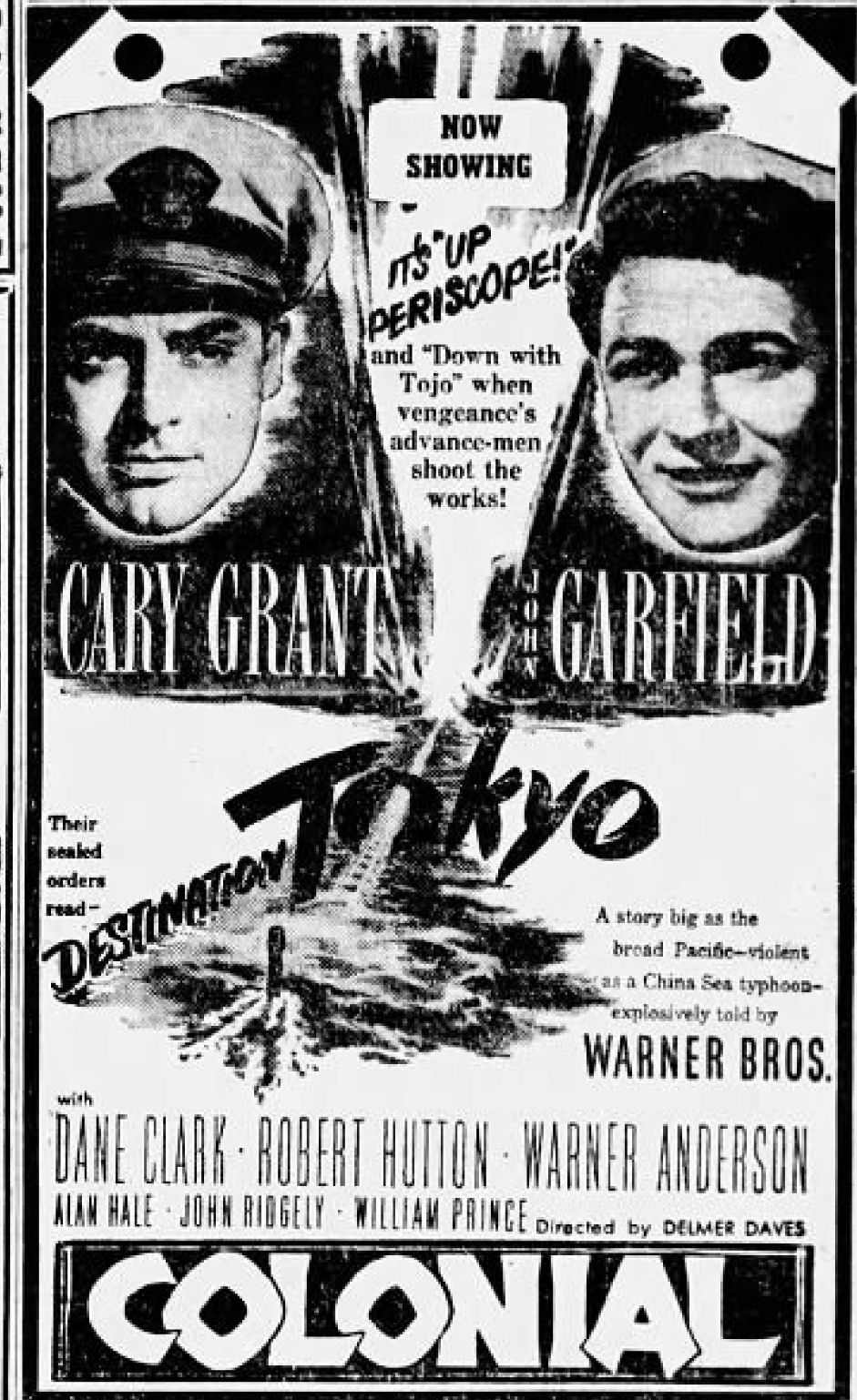
Ad for a showing of Destination Tokyo in Allentown, Pennsylvania

== Reception ==
Destination Tokyo premiered in Pittsburgh on December 15, 1943, as a benefit for crippled children. According to Warner Bros. records, it earned $3,237,000 domestically and $1,307,000 internationally.

The New York Times reviewer Bosley Crowther wrote:

It has a lot of exciting incident in it; some slick, manly performances are turned in by Cary Grant (as the commander), John Garfield, Alan Hale and Dane Clark. But an essential rule of visual drama, which is to put within a frame only so much explicit action as can be realistically accepted in a space of time, is here completely violated. The Warners have a big but too extravagant action film.

In contrast, the review in Variety magazine, was effusive in its praise:

'Destination Tokyo' runs two hours and 15 minutes, and that's a lot of film. But none of it is wasted. In its unspooling is crammed enough excitement for possibly a couple of pictures. Here is a film whose hero is the Stars and Stripes; the performers are merely symbols of that heroism. Here is a film of superbly pooled talents.

Critic and writer James Agee writing in The Nation in 1944 stated that it "combines a good deal of fairly exciting submarine warfare with at least as much human interest, which I found neither very human nor at all interesting." Leslie Halliwell gave it one of four stars: "Solid, well acted war suspenser, but overlong."

A later release of Destination Tokyo was colorized.

== Nominations ==
Screenwriter Steve Fisher received an Academy Award nomination for his original story for Destination Tokyo.

== Influence ==
Inspired by Grant's role, a 17-year-old Tony Curtis forged his mother's signature to enlist in the United States Navy in 1943. Requesting submarine duty, he instead served aboard a submarine tender, USS Proteus. Later, as a top Hollywood talent, he co-starred with Grant as submariners in the 1959 World War II comedy Operation Petticoat, with Grant commanding the fictional USS Sea Tiger.

When the crew of a World War II-submarine in the 1951 movie Operation Pacific is given the treat of watching a movie, Destination Tokyo is screened. Footage from this film was reused in the 1959 film Submarine Seahawk.

According to his autobiography, Destination Tokyo influenced Ronald Reagan in his decision to accept the lead role of a World War II submarine captain in the 1957 movie Hellcats of the Navy.

== Sources ==
- Eliot, Marc.Cary Grant: A Biography. New York: Aurum Press, 2005. ISBN 978-0-30755-497-0.
- Evans, Alun. Brassey's Guide to War Films. Dulles, Virginia: Potomac Books, 2000. ISBN 978-1-57488-263-6.
- Halliwell, Leslie. Leslie Halliwell's Film Guide. New York: Harper & Roe, 1989. ISBN 978-0-06016-322-8.
- Maltin, Leonard. Leonard Maltin's Movie Guide 2013. New York: New American Library, 2012 (originally published as TV Movies, then Leonard Maltin’s Movie & Video Guide), First edition 1969, published annually since 1988. ISBN 978-0-451-23774-3.
- Skinner, Kiron K. and Annelise and Martin Anderson. Reagan: A Life In Letters. New York: Simon and Schuster, 2004. ISBN 978-0-74321-967-9.
