= Borys Lewin =

French film editor

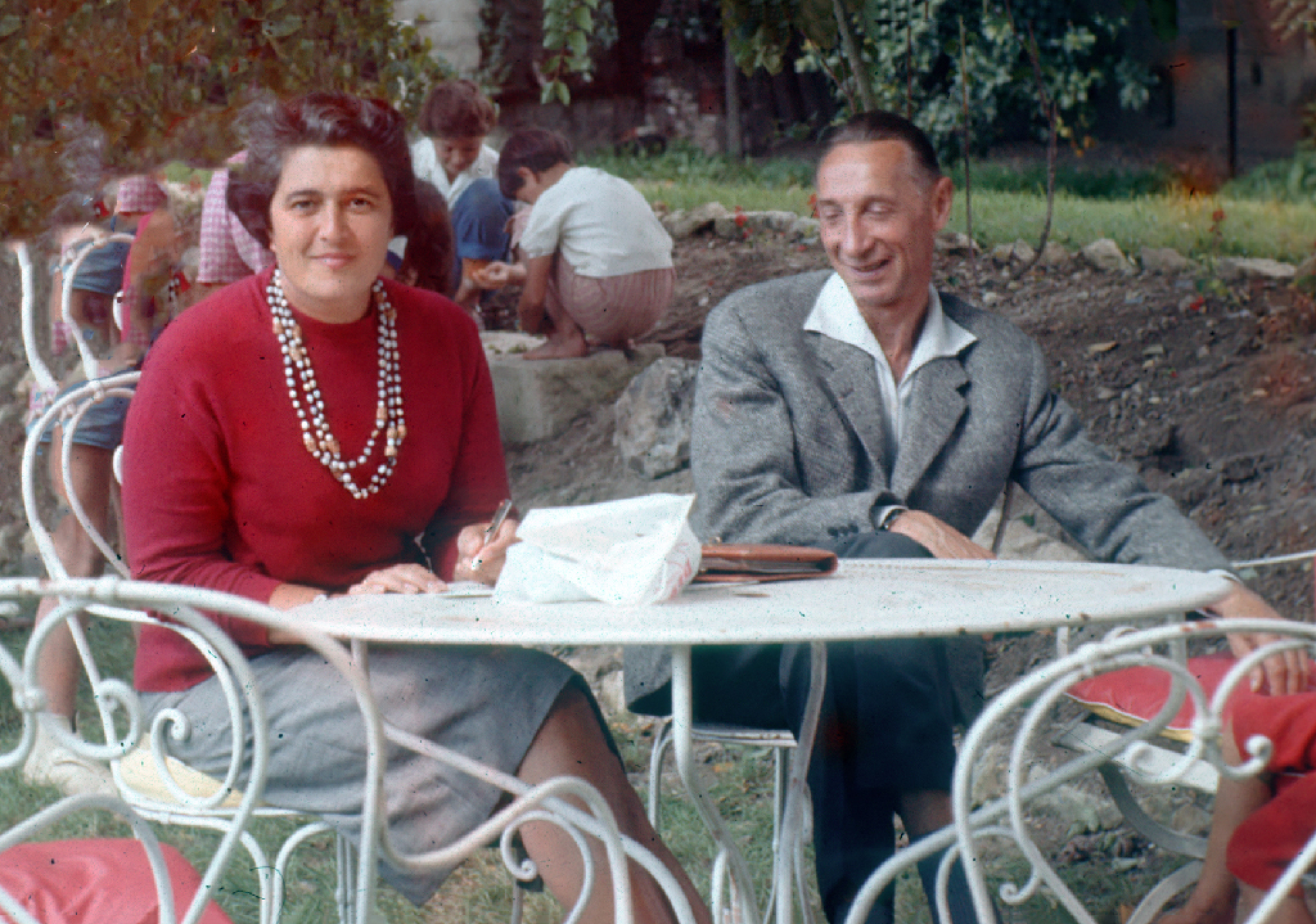
- Lewin and his wife in 1960.
- Born: 1 October 1914; Minsk, Russian Empire
- Died: 4 November 1992 (aged 78); Paris, France
- Other name: Boris Lewin
- Occupations: Editor, Director
- Years active: 1938–1978 (film)

Borys Lewin (1 October 1914 – 4 November 1992) was a Russian-born French film editor. Lewis was born in Minsk in Belarus, which was then part of the Russian Empire. He is sometimes credited as Boris Lewin. He edited around fifty films and television series and also directed one film The Hunted (1950).

== Selected filmography ==
- Conflict (1938)
- Prison sans barreaux (1938)
- Sirocco (1938)
- The Last Turning (1939)
- The World Will Tremble (1939)
- Bethsabée (1947)
- Eternal Conflict (1948)
- The Hunted (1950)
- Rue des Saussaies (1951)
- The House on the Dune (1952)
- The Earrings of Madame de... (1953)
- Hungarian Rhapsody (1954)
- Mata Hari's Daughter (1954)
- Scènes de ménage (1954)
- French Cancan (1955)
- The Little Rebels (1955)
- The Affair of the Poisons (1955)
- Elena and Her Men (1956)
- The Happy Road (1957)
- The Big Chief (1959)
- The Lions Are Loose (1961)
- Mandrin (1962)
- Sept hommes et une garce (1967)

== Bibliography ==
- DeMaio, Patricia A. Garden of Dreams: The Life of Simone Signoret. Univ. Press of Mississippi, 2014.
- Crisp, Colin. French Cinema—A Critical Filmography: Volume 2, 1940–1958. Indiana University Press, 2015.
