= List of French films of 1947 =

A list of films produced in France in 1947.

== A-L ==
Title	Director	Cast	Genre	Notes
The Adventures of Casanova	Jean Boyer	Georges Guétary, Noëlle Norman, Gisèle Préville	Historical	
Antoine and Antoinette	Jacques Becker	Roger Pigaut, Claire Mafféi, Noël Roquevert	Comedy	
Are You Sure?	Jacques Houssin	Robert Dhéry, Martine Carol, Grégoire Aslan	Comedy	
Bathsheba	Léonide Moguy	Danielle Darrieux, Georges Marchal, Jean Murat	Drama	
The Beautiful Days of King Murat	Théophile Pathé	Claude Génia, Alfred Adam, Junie Astor	Drama, historical, musical	Co-production with Italy
The Beautiful Trip	Louis Cuny	Renée Saint-Cyr, Pierre Richard-Willm, André Valmy	Drama	
The Bouquinquant Brothers	Louis Daquin	Albert Préjean, Madeleine Robinson, Roger Pigaut	Drama	
Captain Blomet	Andrée Feix	Fernand Gravey, Gaby Sylvia, Made Siamé	Comedy	
Carbon Copy	Jean Dréville	Louis Jouvet, Suzy Delair	Comedy	
Chinese Quarter	René Sti	Michèle Alfa, Sessue Hayakawa, Alfred Adam	Crime	
Clockface Café	Jean Gehret, Henri Decoin	Bernard Blier, Blanchette Brunoy, Aimé Clariond	Drama	
Coincidences	Serge Debecque	Serge Reggiani, Andrée Clément, Pierre Renoir	Drama	
A Cop	Maurice de Canonge	Lucien Coëdel, Suzy Carrier, Raymond Pellegrin	Crime	
Counter Investigation	Jean Faurez	Lucien Coëdel, Louis Salou, Jany Holt	Drama	
Criminal Brigade	Gilbert Gil	Jean Davy, Maurice Teynac, Gilbert Gil	Crime	
The Crowned Fish Tavern	René Chanas	Michel Simon, Jules Berry, Blanchette Brunoy	Drama	
The Damned	René Clément	Marcel Dalio, Henri Vidal, Florence Marly	War	
Danger of Death	Gilles Grangier	Fernand Ledoux, Georges Lannes, Micheline Francey	Thriller	
Devil in the Flesh	Claude Autant-Lara	Micheline Presle, Gérard Philipe, Denise Grey	Romantic drama	Nominated for Golden Lion, +1 win
Dreams of Love	Christian Stengel	Pierre Richard-Willm, Mila Parély, Annie Ducaux	Historical	
False Identity	André Chotin	Louise Carletti, Georges Rollin, Raymond Bussières	Crime	
Fantômas	Jean Sacha	Marcel Herrand, Simone Signoret, Alexandre Rignault	Horror	
Four Knaves	André Berthomieu	Jean Desailly, Martine Carol, Denise Grey	Comedy	
The Fugitive	Robert Bibal	René Dary, Jean Debucourt, Madeleine Robinson	Drama	
The Great Maguet	Roger Richebé	Madeleine Robinson, Jean Davy, Colette Régis	Historical drama	
The Husbands of Leontine	René Le Hénaff	Jacqueline Gauthier, Pierre Jourdan, Marguerite Pierry	Comedy	
The House Under the Sea	Henri Calef	Viviane Romance, Clément Duhour	Drama	Co-production with UK
Hyménée	Émile Couzinet	Gaby Morlay, Maurice Escande, Pierre Magnier	Drama	
Inspector Sergil	Jacques Daroy	Paul Meurisse, Liliane Bert, Dora Doll	Crime	
The Kids Are Leading the Investigation	Maurice Labro	Constant Rémy, René Génin, François Patrice	Crime	
Les jeux sont faits	Jean Delannoy	Micheline Presle, Marcello Pagliero, Marguerite Moreno	Drama	
Last Chance Castle	Jean-Paul Paulin	Nathalie Nattier, Robert Dhéry, Corinne Calvet	Comedy	
Last Refuge	Marc Maurette	Raymond Rouleau, Mila Parély, Gisèle Pascal	Drama	
Lawless Roads	Guillaume Radot	Ginette Leclerc, Jean Murat, Marguerite Moreno	Drama	
The Lost Village	Christian Stengel	Gaby Morlay, Alfred Adam, Line Noro	Crime drama	
Love Around the House	Pierre de Hérain	Pierre Brasseur, María Casares, Julien Carette	Drama	Co-production with Belgium
The Lovers of Pont Saint Jean	Henri Decoin	Michel Simon, Nadine Alari, Gaby Morlay	Comedy drama	
Loves, Delights and Organs	Andre Berthomieu	Giselle Pascal, Jean Desailly, Catherine Erard	Romantic comedy	

== M-Z ==
Title	Director	Cast	Genre	Notes
Man About Town	René Clair	Maurice Chevalier, Marcelle Derrien, Dany Robin	Comedy	
Mandrin	René Jayet	José Noguéro, Armand Bernard, Mona Goya	Adventure	
The Marriage of Ramuntcho	Max de Vaucorbeil	Gaby Sylvia, Frank Villard, Jean Hébey	Comedy	
Mirror	Raymond Lamy	Jean Gabin, Daniel Gélin, Gisèle Préville	Crime	
Monsieur de Falindor	René Le Hénaff	Jacqueline Dor, Pierre Jourdan, Gilbert Gil	Comedy	
Monsieur Vincent	Maurice Cloche	Pierre Fresnay, Aimé Clariond, Lise Delamare	Drama historical	Nominated for Golden Globe, +2 wins, +2 nom.
Monsieur Wens Holds the Trump Cards	Emile-Georges De Meyst	Louis Salou, Marie Déa, Claudine Dupuis	Mystery	Co-production with Belgium
The Mysterious Monsieur Sylvain	Jean Stelli	Frank Villard, Simone Renant, Jean Chevrier	Mystery	
Mystery Trip	Pierre Prévert	Martine Carol, Maurice Baquet, Jean Sinoël	Comedy	
Naughty Martine	Emil E. Reinert	Dany Robin, Claude Dauphin, Lucien Baroux	Comedy	
Not Guilty	Henri Decoin	Michel Simon, Jean Debucourt, Jany Holt	Crime	
Panic	Julien Duvivier	Viviane Romance, Michel Simon, Lucas Gridoux	Thriller	
One Night at the Tabarin	Karel Lamac	Jacqueline Gauthier, Robert Dhéry, Jean Parédès	Comedy	
Quai des Orfèvres	Henri-Georges Clouzot	Suzy Delair, Bernard Blier, Louis Jouvet	Crime	2 wins
Rendezvous in Paris	Gilles Grangier	Annie Ducaux, Claude Dauphin, Marguerite Moreno	Comedy	
The Royalists	Henri Calef	Jean Marais, Madeleine Robinson, Madeleine Lebeau	Historical	
Rumours	Jacques Daroy	Jacques Dumesnil, Jany Holt, Roger Karl	Drama	
The Scarlet Bazaar	Paul Mesnier	Albert Préjean, Andrée Servilanges, Jean Tissier	Drama	
Secret Cargo	Alfred Rode	Luis Mariano, Käthe von Nagy, Claudine Dupuis	Drama	
The Secret of Florida	Jacques Houssin	Albert Préjean, Henri Guisol, Lysiane Rey	Crime	
The Seventh Door	André Zwoboda	Georges Marchal, María Casares, Aimé Clariond	Drama	
The Sharks of Gibraltar	Emil E. Reinert	Annie Ducaux, Louis Salou, Yves Vincent	Thriller	
Six Hours to Lose	Alex Joffé	André Luguet, Denise Grey, Paulette Dubost	Drama	
Something to Sing About	Gilles Grangier	Luis Mariano, Arlette Merry, Noël Roquevert	Musical comedy	
Sybille's Night	Jean-Paul Paulin	Lucien Baroux, Paulette Élambert, Daniel Gélin	Comedy	
Third at Heart	Jacques de Casembroot	Georges Grey, Sophie Desmarets, Henri Guisol	Comedy	
The Three Cousins	Jacques Daniel-Norman	Rellys, Andrex, Lysiane Rey, Marie Bizet	Comedy	
The Unknown Singer	André Cayatte	Tino Rossi, Maria Mauban, Raymond Bussières	Drama	
Vertigo	Richard Pottier	Raymond Rouleau, Micheline Francey, Jean Debucourt	Drama	
The Village of Wrath	Raoul André	Louise Carletti, Paul Cambo, Micheline Francey	Drama	
The Woman in Red	Louis Cuny	Jean Debucourt, Pierre Larquey, Simone Sylvestre	Crime	
Woman of Evil	Edmond T. Gréville	Charles Vanel, Jean Chevrier, Héléna Bossis	Drama	

== Short films ==
Title	Director	Cast	Genre	Notes
L'École des facteurs	Jacques Tati	Jacques Tati	Comedy (short)	

== See also ==
- 1947 in France
