= List of French films of 1940 =

A list of films produced in France in 1940:

== A-L ==
Title	Director	Cast	Genre	Notes
Apres Mein Kampf, Mes Crimes	Alexandre Ryder	Roger Karl, Line Noro	War drama	
Beating Heart	Henri Decoin	Danielle Darrieux, Claude Dauphin, André Luguet	Comedy drama	
Bécassine	Pierre Caron	Max Dearly, Paulette Dubost, Annie France	Comedy	
The Blue Danube	Emil E. Reinert, Alfred Rode	Madeleine Sologne, José Noguéro, Marguerite Moreno	Drama	
Camp Thirteen	Jacques Constant	Alice Field, Gabriel Gabrio	Drama	
La Comédie du bonheur	Marcel L'Herbier	Michel Simon, Ramon Novarro, Jacqueline Delubac	Comedy	Co-production with Italy
Cristobal's Gold	Jean Stelli, Jacques Becker	Charles Vanel, Conchita Montenegro, Albert Préjean	Drama	
Diamant Noir	Jean Delannoy	Louise Carletti, Charles Vanel	Drama	
Facing Destiny	Henri Fescourt	Jules Berry, George Rigaud, Josseline Gaël	Spy drama	
The Emigrant	Léo Joannon	Edwige Feuillère, Jean Chevrier, Georges Lannes	Comedy	
Espoirs...(Le Champ maudit)	Willy Rozier	Constant Remy, Pierre Larquey		
False Alarm	Jacques de Baroncelli	Lucien Baroux, Micheline Presle, Josephine Baker	Comedy drama	
Faut ce qu’il faut	René Pujol	Pierre Larquey, Marguerite Pierry	Comedy drama	AKA Monsieur Bibi
Feu de paille	Jean-Benoît Lévy			
Finance Noire	Félix Gandéra			
Hangman's Noose	Léon Mathot	Jacqueline Delubac, Andre Luguet, Annie Vernay	Mystery	
Ils Etaient cinq Permissionnaires	Pierre Caron	Armand Bernard, Ginette Leclerc		
L'An quarante	Fernand Rivers	Josseline Gael, Marcelle Praince		
L’empreinte du dieu	Léonide Moguy	Pierre Blanchar, Annie Ducaux		
La Comedie du Bonheur	Marcel l'Herbier	Michel Simon, Ramon Novarro	Comedy	
Love Cavalcade	Raymond Bernard	Simone Simon, Claude Dauphin, Michel Simon	Drama	

== M-Z ==
Title	Director	Cast	Genre	Notes
The Man from Niger	Jacques de Baroncelli	Victor Francen, Harry Baur, Annie Ducaux	Drama	
The Man Who Seeks the Truth	Alexander Esway	Raimu, Yvette Lebon, Jacqueline Delubac	Comedy	
The Marvelous Night	Jean-Paul Paulin	Fernandel, Charles Vanel, Janine Darcey	Comedy	
Miquette	Jean Boyer	Lilian Harvey, Lucien Baroux, André Lefaur	Comedy	
The Mondesir Heir	Albert Valentin	Fernandel, Elvire Popesco, Jules Berry	Comedy	
Monsieur Hector	Maurice Cammage	Fernandel, Denise Grey, Raymond Rognoni	Comedy	
Musicians of the Sky	Georges Lacombe	Michèle Morgan, Michel Simon, René Lefèvre	Drama	
Narcisse	Ayres d'Aguiar	Rellys, Paul Azaïs, Monique Rolland	Comedy	
Nightclub Hostess	Albert Valentin	Michèle Morgan, Gilbert Gil, Gisèle Préville	Drama	
Night in December	Curtis Bernhardt	Pierre Blanchar, Renée Saint-Cyr, Jean Tissier	Drama	
Paradise Lost	Abel Gance	Fernand Gravey, Elvire Popesco, Micheline Presle	War drama	
Paris-New York	Yves Mirande	Gaby Morlay, Michel Simon, Claude Dauphin	Comedy	
President Haudecoeur	Jean Dréville	Harry Baur, Betty Stockfeld, Marguerite Deval	Comedy	
Radio Surprises	Marcel Aboulker	Marguerite Moreno, Armand Bernard, Grégoire Aslan	Revue	
Sarajevo	Max Ophüls	Edwige Feuillère, John Lodge, Aimé Clariond	Historical	
Serenade	Jean Boyer	Lilian Harvey, Louis Jouvet, Bernard Lancret	Historical	
Sing Anyway	Pierre Caron	Annie Vernay, Paul Cambo, Noël Roquevert	Comedy	
Soyez les Bienvenus	Jacques de Baroncelli	Gabrielle Dorziat, Simone Berriau	Comedy	
They Were Twelve Women	Georges Lacombe	Gaby Morlay, Françoise Rosay, Micheline Presle	Comedy	
Threats	Edmond T. Gréville	Mireille Balin, Ginette Leclerc, Erich von Stroheim	Drama	
Thunder Over Paris	Dominique Bernard-Deschamps	Arletty, Marcel Dalio, Erich von Stroheim	Drama	
Tobias Is an Angel	Yves Allégret	Pierre Brasseur, Janine Darcey, Pauline Carton	Comedy	
Two Women	Léonide Moguy	Pierre Blanchar, Annie Ducaux, Ginette Leclerc	Drama	
Un chapeau de paille d'Italie	Maurice Cammage	Fernandel, Fernand Charpin	Comedy	
Vingt-Quatre Heures de Perm	Maurice Cloche	Jorge Rigaud, Blanchette Brunoy		
Volpone	Maurice Tourneur	Harry Baur, Louis Jouvet	Drama	
The Well-Digger's Daughter	Marcel Pagnol	Raimu, Fernandel, Josette Day	Romantic Comedy	

== See also ==
- 1940 in France
