= List of French films of 1944 =

A list of films produced in France in 1944. Film production was at a low due to the height of the Second World War.

Title	Director	Cast	Genre	Notes
The Angel of the Night	André Berthomieu	Jean-Louis Barrault, Michèle Alfa, Henri Vidal	Romance	
Behold Beatrice	Jean de Marguenat	Fernand Ledoux, Renée Faure, Jules Berry	Drama	
Bonsoir mesdames, bonsoir messieurs	Roland Tual	Gaby Sylvia, François Périer		
Carmen	Christian-Jaque	Viviane Romance, Jean Marais, Lucien Coëdel	Drama	based on the novella
Cecile Is Dead	Maurice Tourneur	Albert Préjean, Santa Relli	Thriller	
Coup de tête (1944 film)	René Le Hénaff	Alerme, Jean Tissier		
Death No Longer Awaits	Jean Tarride	Jacqueline Gauthier, Jules Berry, Gérard Landry	Crime	
First on the Rope	Louis Daquin	André Le Gall, Maurice Baquet, Irène Corday	Drama	
Florence Is Crazy	Georges Lacombe	Annie Ducaux, André Luguet, Pierre Palau	Comedy	
The Hunchback	Jean Delannoy	Pierre Blanchar, Paul Bernard	Adventure historical	
The Island of Love	Maurice Cam	Tino Rossi, Édouard Delmont, Josseline Gaël		
L' Amour maternel chez les animaux	Jean Mineur		Nature documentary	
L'Aventure est au coin de la rue	Jacques Daniel-Norman	Raymond Rouleau, Michele Alfa	Comedy thriller	
L'Enfant de l'amour	Jean Stelli	Gaby Morlay, François Périer, Aimé Clariond		
La Malibran (1944 film)	Sacha Guitry	Geori-Boué, Mona Goya, Suzy Prim	Musical biopic	
La Rabouilleuse	Fernand Rivers	Suzy Prim, Fernand Gravey, Pierre Larquey		
Le Bal des passants	Guillaume Radot	Annie Ducaux, Jacques Dumesnil		
Le carrefour des enfants perdus	Léo Joannon	René Dary	Drama	
Life of Pleasure	Albert Valentin	Albert Préjean, Aimé Clariond, Jean Servais	Comedy drama	
Les Petites du quai aux fleurs	Marc Allégret	Odette Joyeux, André Lefaur	Romantic comedy	
MCDXXIX-MCMXLII (De Jeanne d'Arc à Philippe Pétain)	Sacha Guitry		Historical documentary	
The Ménard Collection	Bernard Roland	Foun-Sen, Robert Le Vigan, Lucien Baroux	Comedy	
Night Shift	Jean Faurez	Gaby Morlay, Louis Seigner, Jacques Dumesnil	Comedy	
Sowing the Wind	Maurice Gleize	Jacques Dumesnil, Marcelle Géniat, Lise Delamare	Drama	
Traveling Light	Jean Anouilh	Pierre Fresnay, Blanchette Brunoy, Pierre Renoir	Drama	
The White Blackbird	Jacques Houssin	Saturnin Fabre, Julien Carette, Georges Rollin	Comedy	
Twilight	Marc Allégret	Claude Dauphin, Micheline Presle, Louis Jourdan	Romance, drama	
Vautrin	Pierre Billon	Madeleine Sologne, Georges Marchal, Michel Simon	Historical	
The Woman Who Dared	Jean Grémillon	Madeleine Renaud, Charles Vanel, Jean Debucourt	Drama	

== See also ==
- 1944 in France
