= It Happened in Paris (1952 film) =

1952 film

- Directed by: Henri Lavorel; John Berry
- Written by: Ben Barzman
- Produced by: Henri Lavorel
- Starring: Henri Vidal; Evelyn Keyes; Jean Wall
- Cinematography: Jean Bourgoin
- Edited by: Marinette Cadix
- Music by: Norbert Glanzberg
- Production company: Le Monde en Images
- Distributed by: L'Alliance Générale de Distribution Cinématographique
- Release date: 26 December 1952
- Running time: 90 minutes
- Country: France
- Language: French

It Happened in Paris (French: C'est arrivé à Paris) is a 1952 French comedy film directed by Henri Lavorel and John Berry and starring Henri Vidal, Evelyn Keyes and Jean Wall.

== Cast ==
- Henri Vidal as Vladimir Krasnya
- Evelyn Keyes as Patricia Moran
- Jean Wall as Hugo
- Frédéric O'Brady as Otto
- Nicolas Amato
- Andrès
- Jean-François Calvé
- Marcel Charvey as Le maître d'hotel
- Max Dalban as Le boucher
- André Dalibert as Le fleuriste
- Paul Faivre as Le turfiste
- Pierre Gay as Le barman
- Émile Genevois as Le groom
- Camille Guérini as Le père de la petite fille
- Clément Harari
- Fred Hébert
- Kirchberger
- Robert Lombard as Marcel
- Paul Mesnier
- Bernard Musson as Le contrôleur à la gare
- Jean Ozenne as L'oncle
- Germaine Reuver as Madame Poteau
- André Roanne as Le gérant du restaurant
- Pierre Sergeol as Le garagiste
- Michel Vadet

== Bibliography ==
- Rebecca Prime. Hollywood Exiles in Europe: The Blacklist and Cold War Film Culture. Rutgers University Press, 2014.
