= Frédéric Mariotti =

French actor

- Born: 1 April 1883; Marseille, France
- Died: 22 February 1971 (aged 87); Paris, France
- Occupation: Actor
- Years active: 1910–1952

Frédéric Mariotti (1 April 1883 – 22 February 1971) was a French stage and film actor whose career spanned more than four decades through the early silent film era into the early 1950s.

== Biography ==
Frédéric Mariotti was born in Marseille and began his film career in the 1917 Georges Monca-directed La bonne hôtesse, starring Roger Vincent and Gabrielle Robinne, for Pathé Frères. In 1919, he appeared in the Louis Feuillade-directed crime drama Barrabas, which ran in twelve installments. This was followed by another film serial released the same year, La nouvelle aurore (also known as Les nouvelles aventures de Chéri-Bibi), directed by Emile-Edouard Violet, comprising sixteen episodes.

One of Frédéric Mariotti's most internationally recalled roles is perhaps that of Toni in the 1926 United States Rex Ingram directed Mare Nostrum, which starred American actress Alice Terry and Spanish actor Antonio Moreno and based on the Vicente Blasco Ibáñez penned novel of the same name. The film was long thought lost, but was rediscovered and restored. Mariotti would round out the silent film era of the 1920s in French films directed by Georges Pallu, Julien Duvivier, Henri Ménessier, and Louis Mercanton.

Mariotti transitioned to sound films with relative ease, and during the 1930s, he appeared in approximately forty-five films. During the Second World War and the German occupation of northern and western France he continued to appear onscreen in films directed by André Luguet, Jean Boyer, Jean de Limur, Édouard Delmont, and Jean Dréville; albeit largely in smaller roles and bit parts.

Following the end of the Second World War, Mariotti continued appearing onscreen; however, his roles grew smaller and were often uncredited appearances. His last film role was a small, uncredited part in the Charles-Félix Tavano-directed comedy Coq en pâte, starring Maurice Escande and Jacqueline Gauthier, filmed in 1951 and released in 1952. Following his appearance in Coq en pâte, Mariotti retired from film, having appeared in over one-hundred motion pictures.

== Death ==
Frédéric Mariotti lived in Paris after he retired from films and died there in 1971, aged 87.

== Selected filmography ==
- Mare Nostrum (1926)
- Vénus (1929)
- Sister of Mercy (French: La petite soeur des pauvres) (1929)
- Captain Craddock (French: Le capitaine Craddock) (1931)
- The Night of Decision (German: Die Nacht der Entscheidung) (1931)
- Calais-Dover (French: Calais-Douvres) (1931)
- The Rebel (French: Le rebelle) (1931)
- Baroud (1932)
- Beauty of the Night (1934)
- The Last Night (French: La dernière nuit) (1934)
- The Uncle from Peking (French: L'oncle de Pékin) (1934)
- Gaspard de Besse (1935)
- Thirteen Days of Love (1935)
- The New Men (French: Les Hommes nouveaux) (1936)
- The Call of Life (French: L'appel de la vie) (1937)
- The Man of the Hour (French: L'homme du jour) (1937)
- Men of Prey (French: Les hommes de proie) 1937)
- Lady Killer (French: Gueule d'amour) (1937)
- Ultimatum (1938)
- Alert in the Mediterranean (French: Alerte en Méditerranée) (1938)
- Orage (1938)
- A Foolish Maiden (1938)
- Immediate Call (French: Rappel immédiat) (1939)
- Cristobal's Gold (French: L'or du Cristobal) (1940)
- The Emigrant (French: L'émigrante) (1940)
- The Mondesir Heir (French: L'héritier des Mondésir) (1940)
- Bolero (1942)
- The Man Who Played with Fire (1942)
- Fever (1942)
- The Lost Woman (French: La femme perdue) (1942)
- Marie-Martine (1943)
- The Lucky Star (1943)
- The Stairs Without End (French: L'escalier sans fin) (1943)
- Voyage Without Hope (French: Voyage sans espoir) (1943)
- François Villon (1945)
- A Cage of Nightingales (French: La Cage aux rossignols) (1945)
- The Black Night (French: Le cavalier noir) (1945)
- The Great Pack (1945)
- Fantômas (1946)
- Martin Roumagnac (1946)
- The Captain (French: Le capitan) (1946)
- The Ideal Couple (French: Le couple idéal) (1946)
- The Chips are Down (French: Les jeux sont faits) (1947)
- Last Chance Castle (French: Le château de la dernière chance) (1947)
- Five Red Tulips (French: Cinq tulipes rouges) (1949)
- Manon (1949)
- Sending of Flowers (French: Envoi de fleurs) (1950)
- Justice Is Done (French: Justice est faite) (1950)
- Cartouche, King of Paris (French: Cartouche, roi de Paris) (1950)
- Blonde (French: Tête blonde) (1950)
- Murders (1950)
