= Henri Marchand =

Henri Marchand may refer to:

- Henri Marchand (sculptor) (1887–1960), French-American sculptor
- Henri Marchand (actor) (1898–1959), French actor
