= 1940 in France =

- Decades: 1920s; 1930s; 1940s; 1950s; 1960s
- See also: History of France; Timeline of French history; List of years in France

Events from the year 1940 in France.

== Incumbents ==
- Chief of State: Albert Lebrun (until 11 July), Philippe Pétain (starting 11 July)
- Vice-president of the Council of Ministers:
  - until 21 March: Édouard Daladier
  - 21 March-16 June: Paul Reynaud
  - 16 June-11 July: Philippe Pétain
  - 11 July-13 December: Pierre Laval
  - starting 13 December: Pierre-Étienne Flandin

== Events ==
- 21 March – Édouard Daladier resigns as Prime Minister. French cabinet shuffles and Daladier is replaced by Paul Reynaud.
- 10 May – Battle of France begins. German forces invade Low Countries.
- 13 May – German armies open 60-mile wide breach in Maginot Line at Sedan.
- 18 May – Marshal Philippe Pétain named vice-premier of France.
- 19 May – General Maxime Weygand replaces Maurice Gamelin as commander-in-chief of all French forces.
- 20 May – German forces, under General Erwin Rommel, reach the English Channel.
- 26 May – Dunkirk evacuation of British Expeditionary Force starts.
- 3 June – Paris is bombed by the Luftwaffe for the first time.
- 4 June – Dunkirk evacuation ends – British forces complete evacuating 300,000 troops.
- 10 June
  - French government flees to Tours.
  - Italy declares war on France and the United Kingdom.
- 12 June – 13,000 British and French troops surrender to Field Marshal Erwin Rommel at St. Valery-en-Caux.
- 13 June – Paris is declared an open city.
- 14 June
  - Paris falls under German occupation and German troops march past the Arc de Triomphe, following exactly the same route that the victorious French troops coming home from the First World War, 22 years previously.
  - French government flees to Bordeaux.
- 15 June – Verdun falls to German forces.
- 16 June – The Churchill war ministry in the United Kingdom offers a Franco-British Union (inspired by Jean Monnet) to Paul Reynaud, Prime Minister of France, in the hope of preventing France from agreeing to an armistice with Germany, but Reynaud resigns when his own cabinet refuses to accept it.
- 17 June
  - Philippe Pétain becomes Prime Minister of France and immediately asks Germany for peace terms.
  - Operation Aerial begins – Allied troops start to evacuate France, following Germany's takeover of Paris and most of the nation.
  - Luftwaffe Junkers Ju 88 bomber sinks RMS Lancastria, serving as a British troopship evacuating troops and nationals from near Saint-Nazaire, with the loss of at least 4,000 lives, immediate news of which is suppressed in the British press.
- 18 June – Appeal of 18 June: General Charles de Gaulle, de facto leader of the Free French Forces, makes his first broadcast appeal over Radio Londres from London, rallying the French Resistance, calling on all French people to continue the fight against Nazi Germany: "France has lost a battle. But France has not lost the war".
- 21 June – Armistice negotiations begin at Compiègne.
- 22 June – Armistice of 22 June 1940: The French Third Republic and Nazi Germany sign an armistice ending the Battle of France, in the Forest of Compiègne, in the same Wagons-Lits railroad car used by Marshal Ferdinand Foch to conclude the Armistice of 11 November 1918 with Germany. This divides France into a Zone occupée in the north and west, under the Military Administration in France (Nazi Germany), and a southern Zone libre, Vichy France.
- 23 June – Adolf Hitler surveys newly defeated Paris.
- 24 June – Vichy France signs armistice terms with Italy.
- 28 June – General Charles de Gaulle is officially recognized by Britain as "Leader of all Free Frenchmen, wherever they may be."
- 3 July – Attack on Mers-el-Kébir: British naval units sink or seize ships of the French fleet anchored in the Algerian ports of Mers El Kébir and Oran to prevent them from falling into German hands.
- 4 July – Vichy France breaks off diplomatic relations with Britain.
- 10 July – Vichy France begins with a constitutional law where only 80 members of the parliament vote against.
- 12 September – Lascaux: 17,000-year-old cave paintings are discovered by a group of young Frenchmen hiking through Southern France. The paintings depict animals and date to the Stone Age.
- 24 October – Pétain meets with Hitler at Montoire and shakes his hand.

== Births ==
=== January to June ===
- 9 January – Pierre Combescot, journalist and writer (died 2017)
- 14 January – Georgie Dann, singer (died 2021)
- 30 January – Françoise Delord, ornithologist and zoo-owner (died 2021)
- 6 March
  - Philippe Amaury, publishing tycoon and entrepreneur (died 2006)
  - Philippe Lacoue-Labarthe, philosopher, literary critic, and translator (died 2007)
- 18 March
  - Hugues Gall, opera manager (died 2024)
  - Arlette Laguiller, Trotskyist politician
- 25 March – Jean Ichbiah, computer scientist (died 2007)
- 13 April – J. M. G. Le Clézio, writer and professor
- 22 April – Marie-José Nat, actress (died 2019)
- 27 May – Jean-Claude Piumi, soccer player (died 1996)
- 17 June – Marcel Aubour, international soccer player
- 25 June – Maryvonne Le Dizès, violinist (died 2024)

=== July to December ===
- 23 July – Danielle Collobert, author, poet and journalist (died 1978)
- 28 August – Philippe Léotard, actor and singer (died 2001)
- 31 August – Jean-Pierre Teisseire, politician and professional football player
- 1 September – Annie Ernaux, née Duchesne, author, recipient of the Nobel Prize in Literature
- 24 September – Yves Navarre, writer (died 1994)
- 24 October – Jean-Pierre Genet, cyclist (died 2005)
- 30 December – Philippe Cousteau, oceanographer (died 1979)

== Deaths ==
- 16 January – Émile-Félix Gautier, geographer (born 1864)
- 2 February – Eugène Apert, pediatrician (born 1868)
- 14 March – Paul Lemoine, geologist (born 1878)
- 24 March – Edouard Branly, inventor and physicist (born 1844)
- 13 April – Pierre Marie, neurologist (born 1853)
- 18 May – Adolphe Guillaumat, army general (born 1864)
- 23 May – Paul Nizan, philosopher and writer (born 1905)
- 6 June – Maurice Arnoux, World War I flying ace (born 1895)
- 2 August – Jules-Louis Breton, chemist, politician and inventor (born 1872)
- 25 August – Prince Jean, Duke of Guise, great-grandson of Louis Philippe I, King of the French (born 1874)
- 4 September – Émile Régnier, World War I flying ace (born 1896)
- 27 November
  - Jean Chiappe, civil servant (born 1878)
  - Henri Guillaumet, aviator (born 1902)

== See also ==
- List of French films of 1940
