= The Fakir of the Grand Hotel =

1934 film

- Directed by: Pierre Billon
- Written by: Jean-Georges Auriol; Georges Dolley; Léopold Marchand
- Based on: Le Fakir du Grand Hôtel by Georges Dolley and Léopold Marchand
- Produced by: Joseph Daniloff; Christian Stengel
- Starring: Armand Bernard; Paulette Dubost; Annie Ducaux
- Cinematography: Léonce-Henri Burel
- Music by: Casimir Oberfeld
- Production company: Dana Film
- Release date: 5 January 1934
- Running time: 100 minutes
- Country: France
- Language: French

The Fakir of the Grand Hotel (French: Le fakir du Grand Hôtel) is a 1934 French comedy film directed by Pierre Billon and starring Armand Bernard, Paulette Dubost and Annie Ducaux. The film's sets were designed by the art director Robert-Jules Garnier.

== Synopsis ==
Professor Demonio, a fakir, impresses a wealthy young man so much that he hires him to teach him to sort out his life, including his romantic entanglements.

== Cast ==
- Armand Bernard as Le professeur Demonio
- Paulette Dubost as Estelle
- Annie Ducaux as Suzanne Méria
- Gaby Basset as Titi
- André Burgère as Alain Lecharretier
- Charles Dechamps as Le maître d'hôtel
- Robert Goupil as Lucas
- Maurice Rémy as Éric

== Bibliography ==
- Bessy, Maurice & Chirat, Raymond. Histoire du cinéma français: 1929-1934. Pygmalion, 1988.
- Crisp, Colin. Genre, Myth and Convention in the French Cinema, 1929-1939. Indiana University Press, 2002.
- Goble, Alan. The Complete Index to Literary Sources in Film. Walter de Gruyter, 1999.
- Rège, Philippe. Encyclopedia of French Film Directors, Volume 1. Scarecrow Press, 2009.
