= Henri Marchand (actor) =

French actor

- Born: 28 August 1898; Mainvilliers
- Died: 22 May 1959 (aged 60); Paris
- Resting place: Cimetière parisien de Pantin
- Occupation: Actor
- Works: Le Bossu, Operation Magali, Volga in Flames, À Nous la Liberté

Henri François Jean André Marchand (28 August 1898, Mainvilliers, Eure-et-Loir, France – 22 May 1959, 15th arrondissement of Paris) known as Henri Marchand — was a French actor of stage and screen.

== Filmography ==
- 1927 : Mathusalem ou l'éternel bourgeois (short film by Jean Painlevé)
- 1931 : À nous la liberté (Director: René Clair) ... as Émile
- 1932 : Amour amour / Pour ses beaux yeux (Director: Robert Bibal) ... as Paul Berton
- 1932 : L'enfant du miracle (Director: Maurice Diamant-Berger) ... as Georges
- 1932 : Je vous aimerai toujours (Director: Mario Camerini) ... as Pierre Duchesne
- 1934 : Volga in Flames de Victor Tourjansky ... as Ivan
- 1934 : Le Billet de mille de Marc Didier ... as the Manager
- 1934 : Le Bossu de René Sti : Passepoil
- 1934 : La Marche nuptiale de Mario Bonnard : César
- 1934 : Ces messieurs de la noce de Germain Fried (court métrage)
- 1934 : Crémaillère de Georges Root (court métrage)
- 1934 : L'École des resquilleurs de Germain Fried (court métrage)
- 1935 : Madame Angot's Daughter de Jean Bernard-Derosne : Antonin
- 1935 : La Tendre Ennemie de Max Ophüls : l'extra
- 1935 : L'Enfant du Danube de Charles le Derle et André Alexandre: a sailor
- 1935 : Bébé est un amour de M. Rugard (court métrage)
- 1936 : Monsieur Personne de Christian-Jaque : Germain
- 1936 : Match nul de Maurice Gleize (moyen métrage)
- 1937 : The Two Schemers de Jacques Houssin : Cormoz
- 1939 : Musicians of the Sky de Georges Lacombe
- 1939 : Thunder Over Paris de Bernard Deschamps : le badeau bègue
- 1949 : La Souricière d'Henri Calef : un juré
- 1950 : Under the Sky of Paris de Julien Duvivier : un journaliste
- 1950 : Trois Télégrammes d'Henri Decoin : Joseph, le concierge de l'école
- 1951 : Clara de Montargis d'Henri Decoin
- 1951 : Love in the Vineyard de Robert Vernay : le copain
- 1951 : The Most Beautiful Girl in the World de Christian Stengel : le maire
- 1952 : L'amour n'est pas un péché de Claude Cariven
- 1952 : Les Belles de nuit de René Clair : l'abbé en 1789
- 1952 : Full House d'Henri Verneuil (dans le sketch Le Témoignage d'un enfant de chœur)
- 1952 : Operation Magali de László Kish
- 1953 : L'Amour d'une femme de Jean Grémillon
- 1953 : Jeunes Mariés, de Gilles Grangier : le curé (non crédité)
- 1956 : Les Aventures de Till L'Espiègle de Gérard Philipe et Joris Ivens : le prêtre
- 1957 : The Heartthrob (Le Tombeur) by René Delacroix
- 1958 : Pourquoi viens-tu si tard? by Henri Decoin

== Theater ==
- 1945 : A Flea in Her Ear by Georges Feydeau, mise en scène Robert Ancelin, Théâtre de la Porte-Saint-Martin
- 1949 : Le Roi by Robert de Flers and Gaston Arman de Caillavet, mise en scène Jacques Charon, Comédie-Française
- 1950 : La Belle Aventure by Gaston Arman de Caillavet, Robert de Flers and Étienne Rey, mise en scène Jean Debucourt, Comédie-Française
- 1950 : A Winter Tale by William Shakespeare, mise en scène Julien Bertheau, Comédie-Française
- 1951 : Madame Sans-Gêne by Victorien Sardou, mise en scène Georges Chamarat, Comédie-Française
- 1952 : Lorenzaccio by Alfred de Musset, mise en scène Gérard Philipe, TNP Festival d'Avignon
