= The City of Lights =

1938 film

- Directed by: Jean de Limur
- Written by: Fernand Crommelynck; Jean de Limur
- Based on: The City of Lights by Jacques Floury
- Starring: Madeleine Robinson; Daniel Lecourtois; Claire Gérard
- Cinematography: Willy Faktorovitch; Jean-Paul Goreaud
- Edited by: Jacques Grassi
- Music by: Bert Reisfeld; Louis Wins
- Production company: Production CDL
- Distributed by: Compagnie Universelle Cinématographique
- Release date: 8 December 1938
- Running time: 96 minutes
- Country: France
- Language: French

The City of Lights (French: La Cité des lumières) is a 1938 French drama film directed by Jean de Limur and starring Madeleine Robinson, Daniel Lecourtois, and Claire Gérard. The film's sets were designed by art director Émile Duquesne.

== Synopsis ==
Madeleine Pascard a university student falls in love with the assistant of a doctor, but also attracts the interest of the doctor's son. This leads to conflict between the two. When her own father dies leaving her financially ruined Madeleine has to leave her studies and finds work as a taxi dancer. Her friend, who has lost touch with her, runs into her suddenly one night at the dance hall and reproves her for taking on such work. However the rift is ultimately healed.

== Cast ==
- Madeleine Robinson as Madeleine Pascard
- Daniel Lecourtois as Rodolphe Davoust
- Pierre Larquey as Alexis - le serviteur
- Claire Gérard as Georges Leclerc
- Yolande Laffon as Madame Davoust
- Valentine Camax as Mademoiselle Grisout
- Paul Demange as Le commissaire-priseur
- Jacqueline Dhomont as Mireille
- Paul Escoffier as L'examinateur
- Robert Favart as Michel - le chauffeur
- Foun-Sen as L'étudiante annamite
- Jean Joffre as Monsieur Pascard
- Léo Lapara as Costabelle
- Marguerite de Morlaye as La dame à la boîte de nuit
- Robert Ralphy as Le vieux beau
- André Siméon as Le patron du restaurant
- Germaine Stainval as Miss Patterson
- Camille Bert as Monsieur Davoust
- Christian Gérard as Madame Pascard
- Claude Norman as La petite chanteuse

== Bibliography ==
- Crisp, Colin. Genre, Myth and Convention in the French Cinema, 1929-1939. Indiana University Press, 2002.
- Rège, Philippe. Encyclopedia of French Film Directors, Volume 1. Scarecrow Press, 2009.
