= The Inevitable Monsieur Dubois =

1943 film

- Directed by: Pierre Billon
- Written by: Pierre Billon; Jacques Companéez; Marc-Gilbert Sauvajon
- Based on: Métier de femme by André-Paul Antoine
- Produced by: Pierre Billon
- Starring: Annie Ducaux; André Luguet; Germaine Reuver
- Cinematography: Paul Cotteret
- Edited by: Madeleine Gug
- Music by: Jean Marion
- Production company: Production Artistique et Cinématographique
- Distributed by: Éclair-Journal
- Release date: 22 September 1943
- Running time: 99 minutes
- Country: France
- Language: French

The Inevitable Monsieur Dubois (French: L'Inévitable Monsieur Dubois) is a 1943 French comedy film directed by Pierre Billon and starring Annie Ducaux, André Luguet and Germaine Reuver. It was shot at the Studio François 1 in Paris. The film's sets were designed by the art director Roland Quignon. Similar in style to screwball comedy, it was produced and released during the German Occupation and was a popular success. It was subsequently remade as the 1947 Swedish film Dinner for Two.

== Synopsis ==
Hélène Mareuil is a successful businesswoman running a luxury perfume factory in Southern France. One day she accidentally knocks down the artist Claude Dubois from his bicycle. He sets out to court her, which is a far from easy task.

== Cast ==
- Annie Ducaux as Hélène Mareuil
- André Luguet as Claude Dubois
- Germaine Reuver as Sophie
- Sinoël as Honoré
- Jean Morel as Le valet de chambre
- Marcel Melrac as Le garagiste
- Janine Viénot as La vendeuse
- Mony Dalmès as Jacqueline Mareuil
- Tramel as Monsieur Mouche
- Richard Francoeur]as Verdier

== Bibliography ==
- Neupert, Richard. French Film History, 1895–1946. University of Wisconsin Pres, 2022.
