= Jean de Baroncelli =

French writer and film critic

- Born: Marie Joseph Henri Jean de Baroncelli; 25 March 1914; Paris, France
- Died: 31 July 1998 (aged 84); Montpellier, Hérault, France
- Occupations: Writer; Cinema critic
- Spouse: Sophie Desmarets
- Children: Caroline
- Parent(s): Jacques de Baroncelli; Marguerite de Mont de Banque

Jean de Baroncelli (25 March 1914 – 31 July 1998) was a French writer. Having achieved some success as a novelist, in 1953 he became a film critic, contributing regularly for Le Monde until 1983.

== Life ==
Marie Joseph Henri Jean de Baroncelli was born in Paris a few months before the outbreak of the First World War. On his father's death, he would become the tenth Marquis of Baroncelli, although the title was little mentioned. His father was the pioneering film director, Jacques de Baroncelli, and the family was based in southern France. More remotely, the family, which had grown prosperous through commerce during the nineteenth century, traced their origins back to Tuscany.

De Baroncelli studied Law and Humanities, emerging with a degree from the prestigious Institut d'études politiques de Paris (Sciences Po). During the 1940s he had several novels published including the wartime novel "Vingt-six hommes" (1942 - "Twenty-six men"), and "Le disgracié" (1946) He married the theatre star Sophie Desmarets in October 1950 and the couple moved into an old farm that he had inherited on the northwestern side of Montpellier where for several years during the summers they followed a celebrity life-style, with frequent parties. However, unseasonal frost in 1956 ruined the wine harvest that year and much of the farmland had to be sold. Further land sales followed, and most of the 300 hectares had been sold and developed for housing by the later 1960s. Meanwhile, the couple's daughter was born in 1952.

From 1953 until 1983, he contributed regularly to Le Monde, supplying numerous film reviews along with interviews and investigative pieces. He served on several film festival juries (Berlin 1957, Cannes 1958 and 1963, and Venice 1961). At one stage, he was a member of the organising committee for the Cannes Film Festival. He has also featured several times on French radio the arts and review programme "Le Masque et la Plume". He was an early contributor to Libération, originally a resistance newspaper, and was a founding member of Association française des cinémas d'art et d'essai (Confederation of Arts Cinemas).
