= Jane Marken =

French actress (1895–1976)

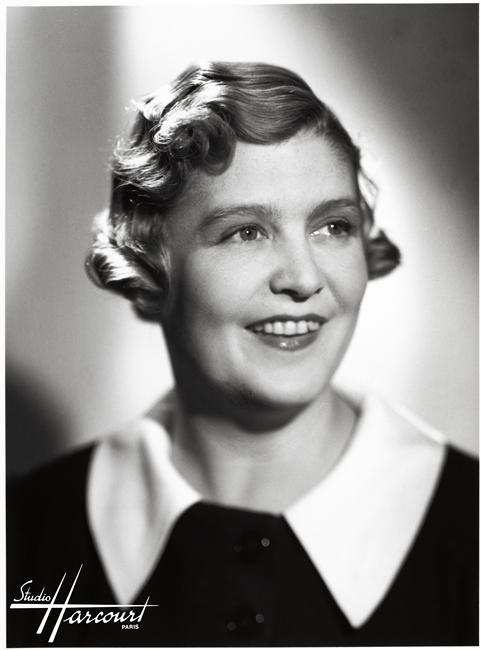
- Born: 13 January 1895; Paris, France
- Died: 1 December 1976 (aged 81); Paris, France
- Occupation: Actress

Jane Marken (born Jeanne Berthe Adolphine Crabbe, sometimes credited as Jeanne Marken; 13 January 1895 in Paris – 1 December 1976 in Paris) was a French actress. She was the first wife of the actor Jules Berry.

Marken began her film career under the aegis of Abel Gance in 1915. She made several films with Marcel Carné including Hotel du Nord (1938), and as Madame Hermine, the hotelier (a comic role) in Les Enfants du Paradis (Children of Paradise, 1945). She also appeared in films of Julien Duvivier, Jacques Becker, Sacha Guitry, Renoir's Partie de campagne (A Day in the Country 1936), Yves Allégret's Une si jolie petite plage (1949) and Manèges (1950), Dr. Knock (1951), The Turkey (1951), and in Roger Vadim's And God Created Woman (1956). Her last appearance was in L'Humeur vagabonde (1971), directed by Édouard Luntz.

== Selected filmography ==
- Fioritures (1916) - Anny Dorleville
- Géo, le mystérieux (1917) - Ginette Dorville
- Madame et son filleul (1919)
- Chouquette et son as (1920) - Chouquette
- That Scoundrel Morin (1932)
- The Ironmaster (1933)
- Court Waltzes (La guerre des valses, 1933)
- The Lady of the Camellias (1934) - Prudence
- Ferdinand the Roisterer (1935) - Mme Bertimey
- Napoléon Bonaparte (1935) - Marie-Anne
- Le chemineau (1935) - Catherine
- La marmaille (1935)
- La Garçonne (1936)
- Beethoven's Great Love (1936) - Esther Frechet - la cuisinière
- L'homme à abattre (1937)
- L'ange du foyer (1937) - Augustine
- Lady Killer (Gueule d'amour, 1937) - Madame Cailloux
- Remontons les Champs-Élysées (1938) - La mère de Louisette
- Three Waltzes (Les trois valses, 1938) - Céleste
- Hôtel du Nord (1938) - Louise Lecouvreur
- There's No Tomorrow (1939) - Mme Béchu (uncredited)
- Paradise Lost (1940) - Madame Bonneron - la concierge
- The Marvelous Night (La nuit merveilleuse, 1940) - Mathilde, l'hôtelière
- La prière aux étoiles (1941)
- A Woman in the Night (1943) - Madame Béghin
- Two Timid Souls (1943) - Tante Valérie
- Summer Light (1943) - Louise Martinet
- Love Eternal (L'Éternel retour, 1943) - Anne
- Adrien (1943) - Madame Hortense
- Les Petites du quai aux fleurs (1944) - Madame Chaussin (uncredited)
- Children of Paradise (1945) - Mme Hermine
- Paris Frills (1945) - Mme Lesurque, la tante de Micheline (uncredited)
- Land Without Stars (1946) - La secrétaire
- The Idiot (L'idiot, 1946) - Naria
- The Eternal Husband (1946) - Amélie Zakhlebinine
- Night Warning (Nuits d'alerte, 1946) - Madame Morizot
- Pétrus (1946) - Mme Portal, la charcutière
- Gates of the Night (1946) - Mme Germaine
- The Beautiful Trip (1947) - La femme d'Albert
- Copie conforme (1947) - La concierge
- Love Around the House (1947) - Madame Jobic
- L'arche de Noé (1947) - Christine Pelpail
- Route sans issue (1948) - Tante Agathe
- Parade du rire (1948) - Mme de Saint-Jules
- Clochemerle (1948) - La baronne de Courtebiche
- Dédée d'Anvers (1948) - Germaine
- Night Express (1948) - Mme Louis
- The Woman I Murdered (1948) - Maria Le Querrec
- Une si jolie petite plage (1949) - Madame Mahieu
- The Ladies in the Green Hats (Ces dames aux chapeaux verts, 1949) - Rosalie Davernis
- The Secret of Mayerling (1949) - La baronne Hélène Vetsera
- Return to Life (1949) - Tante Berthe (segment 1 : "Le retour de tante Emma")
- Manèges (1950) - La mère de Dora
- La Marie du port (1950) - Madame Josselin - la patronne du bar
- Lady Paname (1950) - Madame Gambier
- Chéri (1950) - Charlotte Peloux
- Just Me (1950) - Mme Deply
- Darling Caroline (1951) - Cathy, la nourrice
- Dr. Knock (Knock, 1951) - Mme Parpalaid
- The Passerby (La Passante, 1951) - Mme. Pomont
- Nightclub (1951) - Irma
- Sins of Madeleine (1951) - Mme Antonine
- Two Pennies Worth of Violets (1951) - Madame Dubreck
- Chacun son tour (1951) - Mme Lepage
- The Turkey (1951) - Madame Pinchard
- Et ta soeur (1951) - Amélie
- The Man in My Life (L'Homme de ma vie, 1952) - Emma
- Monsieur Leguignon, Signalman (1952) - Mme. Leguignon
- Mister Taxi (Monsieur Taxi, 1952) - Tante Louise
- A Mother's Secret (1952) - Rosa
- Crazy for Love (Le Trou normand, 1952) - Augustine Lemoine, la tante
- Companions of the Night (Les Compagnes de la nuit, 1953) - Madame Anita
- Captain Pantoufle (Capitaine Pantoufle, 1953) - Madame Cauchard
- Maternité clandestine (1953) - La tante de Jacques
- Leguignon the Healer (1954) - Mme Leguignon
- The Little Rebels (1955) - La déléguée
- Tant qu'il y aura des femmes (1955)
- Marie Antoinette Queen of France (1956) - Mme Victoire
- Pity for the Vamps (1956) - Mme Edith
- And God Created Woman (1956) - Madame Morin
- Les 3 font la paire (1957) - Georgette Bornier
- L'auberge en folie (1957) - Mme. Portafaux
- The Inspector Likes a Fight (1957) - Nène Thierry
- Lovers of Paris (1957) - Eléonore Josserand
- Women's Prison (1958) - Mme Rémon, la belle-mère d'Alice
- Life Together (1958) - Madame Fourneau
- Le Miroir à deux faces (1958) - Madame Vauzange
- Maxime (1958) - Coco Naval
- Ce corps tant désiré (1959) - Mme Féraud
- The Road to Shame (1959) - Mme. Cassini
- Il fiore e la violenza (1962) - Juliette Dufur (segment "La scapagnata")
- La Bonne Soupe (1964) - Mme Alphonse
- Patate (1964) - Berthe
