= Germaine Reuver =

French actress (1885–1953)

- Born: Germaine Jeanne Françoise Reuver; 20 November 1885; Paris, France
- Died: 22 July 1953 (aged 67); Sandillon, Loiret, France
- Occupation: Actress
- Years active: 1908-1953 (film)

Germaine Reuver (1885–1953) was a French stage and film actress.

== Selected filmography ==
- Miss Helyett (1933)
- Lake of Ladies (1934)
- Last Hour (1934)
- His Excellency Antonin (1935)
- Inspector of the Red Cars (1935)
- Madame Angot's Daughter (1935)
- Caprices (1941)
- The Lover of Borneo (1942)
- Private Life (1942)
- The Inevitable Monsieur Dubois (1943)
- Mademoiselle Has Fun (1948)
- Millionaires for One Day (1949)
- The Prize (1950)
- Darling Caroline (1951)
- Shadow and Light (1951)
- Mr. Peek-a-Boo (1951)
- Alone in Paris (1951)
- Piédalu in Paris (1951)
- La Poison (1951)
- My Priest Among the Rich (1952)
- The Red Head (1952)
- It Happened in Paris (1952)
- Companions of the Night (1953)
- The Father of the Girl (1953)
- Midnight Witness (1953)

== Bibliography ==
- Goble, Alan. The Complete Index to Literary Sources in Film. Walter de Gruyter, 1999.
