= The Agony of the Eagles (1933 film) =

1933 film

- Directed by: Roger Richebé
- Written by: Marcel Pagnol; Georges d'Esparbès (novel)
- Starring: Annie Ducaux; Pierre Renoir; Constant Rémy
- Cinematography: Coutelier; André Dantan; Enzo Riccioni
- Edited by: Jean Mamy
- Music by: Vincent Scotto
- Release date: 24 November 1933
- Running time: 125 minutes
- Country: France
- Language: French

The Agony of the Eagles (French: L'agonie des aigles) is a 1933 French historical film directed by Roger Richebé and starring Annie Ducaux, Pierre Renoir and Constant Rémy.

== Cast ==
- Annie Ducaux as Lise Dorian
- Pierre Renoir as Le colonel de Montander
- Constant Rémy as Le capitaine Doguereau
- Jean Debucourt as Le lieutenant Pascal de Breuilly
- Marcel André as Le préfet de police
- Berthe Fusier as La comtesse d'Ormesson
- Gustave Berthier as Le président du tribunal
- Christian Argentin as Le ministre Villèle
- Léon Courtois as Goglu
- Georges Prieur as Grandaye
- Antoine Balpêtré as Le commandant Thiéry
- Philippe Rolla as Le lieutenant Huguenin
- Marc Valbel as Le lieutenant Triaire
- Louis Zellas as Le capitaine Chouard
- Denic as Le commandant Foure
- Romain Bouquet as L'avocat
- Henry Darbray as Le commissaire du gouvernement
- Geymond Vital as Le messager de Nantes
- Daniel Lecourtois as Le jeune aristocrate
- Philippe Richard as Louis
- Paul Azaïs as Le policier

== Bibliography ==
- Klossner, Michael. The Europe of 1500-1815 on Film and Television: A Worldwide Filmography of Over 2550 Works, 1895 Through 2000. McFarland & Company, 2002.
