= Odette Talazac =

French actress (1883–1948)

- Born: Odette Pauline Talzac; 6 May 1883; Paris, France
- Died: 29 March 1948 (aged 64); Paris, France
- Occupation: Actress
- Years active: 1928-1948 (film)

Odette Pauline Talazac (French pronunciation: [ɔdɛt polin talazak]; 6 May 1883 – 29 March 1948) was a French singer and stage and film actress.

Talazac was the daughter of tenor Jean-Alexandre Talazac and his wife, the soprano Hélène Fauvelle. She began her career singing in music halls before turning to the theater and cinema. She was married in 1900 in Chatou to jeweler Georges Aucoc.

== Selected filmography ==
- Two Timid Souls (1928)
- The Queen's Necklace (1929)
- Figaro (1929)
- The Blood of a Poet (1930)
- The Man at Midnight (1931)
- Der Kongreß tanzt (1931)
- The Nude Woman (1932)
- A Telephone Call (1932)
- The House on the Dune (1934)
- George and Georgette (1934)
- Antonia (1935)
- Motherhood (1935)
- Madame Angot's Daughter (1935)
- Anne-Marie (1936)
- In the Service of the Tsar (1936)
- Nights of Fire (1937)
- The Alibi (1937)
- Monsieur Bégonia (1937)
- Southern Mail (1937)
- The Lafarge Case (1938)
- Véréna's Wedding (1938)
- Gibraltar (1938)
- Latin Quarter (1939)
- The White Slave (1939)
- Madame Sans-Gêne (1941)
- Sowing the Wind (1944)
- Happy Go Lucky (1946)
- Last Chance Castle (1947)
- Rendezvous in Paris (1947)
- Clochemerle (1948)

== Bibliography ==
- Capua, Michelangelo. Anatole Litvak: The Life and Films. McFarland, 2015.
