= The Father of the Girl =

1953 film directed by Marcel L'Herbier

- Directed by: Marcel L'Herbier
- Written by: Robert-Paul Dagan; Roger Ferdinand (play); Marcel L'Herbier
- Produced by: Roger Oudet
- Starring: Arletty; Suzy Carrier; André Luguet
- Cinematography: Robert Juillard
- Edited by: Louisette Hautecoeur
- Music by: Jean-Michel Damase
- Production company: F.A.O.
- Distributed by: Ciné Sélection
- Release date: 17 July 1953
- Running time: 100 minutes
- Country: France
- Language: French

The Father of the Girl (French: Le père de Mademoiselle) is a 1953 French comedy film directed by Marcel L'Herbier and starring Arletty, Suzy Carrier and André Luguet.

== Cast ==
- Arletty as Edith Mars
- Suzy Carrier as Françoise Marinier
- André Luguet as Monsieur Marinier
- Denise Grey as Isabelle Marinier
- Jacques François as Michel Leclair
- Mauricet as Le ministre
- Germaine Reuver as Agathe
- Sophie Mallet as Adèle
- Rosine Luguet as La jeune fille
- Pierre Moncorbier as L'huissier
- Claude Le Lorrain
- Floriane Prévot

== Bibliography ==
- Parish, Robert. Film Actors Guide. Scarecrow Press, 1977.
