= Nights of Fire =

1937 film directed by Marcel L'Herbier

- Directed by: Marcel L'Herbier
- Written by: Marcel L'Herbier; T.H. Robert; Jean Sarment
- Based on: The Living Corpse by Leo Tolstoy
- Produced by: Gregor Rabinovitch
- Starring: Gaby Morlay; Victor Francen; Madeleine Robinson
- Cinematography: Louis Née; Armand Thirard
- Edited by: Victor De Fast
- Music by: Jean Wiener
- Production company: Ciné-Alliance
- Distributed by: Ciné-Alliance
- Release date: 16 April 1937
- Running time: 98 minutes
- Country: France
- Language: French

Nights of Fire (French: Nuits de feu) is a 1937 French drama film directed by Marcel L'Herbier and starring Gaby Morlay, Victor Francen and Madeleine Robinson.

== Background ==
The scenario is based on the 1901 work The Living Corpse by Leo Tolstoy.

The film's sets were designed by the art directors Guy de Gastyne and Eugène Lourié while the costumes were by Georges Annenkov.

== Cast ==
- Gaby Morlay as Lisa Andreieva
- Victor Francen as Fedor Andreiev
- George Rigaud as Serge Rostoff
- Madeleine Robinson as Macha
- Sinoël as the man at the jury court
- Mia Slavenska as the ballerina
- Paule Andral as Lisa's mother
- Gabriel Signoret as the substitute Bobinine
- Jeanne Lory as Misses Bobinine
- Odette Talazac as a gipsy
- André Nox as the president
- René Bergeron as an informer
- Jean Toulout as Balichev
- René Génin as Balichev's client
- Paulette Burguetas the photographer
- Albert Malbert as Le cocher
- Yvonne Yma as La femme du cocher
- Marguerite de Morlaye as Une spectatrice à l'opéra
- Luce Fabiole as Une invitée aux fiançailles
- Blanche Denège as Une invitée aux fiançailles
- Jeanne de Carol as Une invitée aux fiançailles
- Ernest Ferny as L'officier
- Charles Dorat as Un prisonnier
- Roger Monteaux as Le commissaire
- Titys as Un magistrat
- Roger Legris as Le jeune soldat
- Sylvain as Un soldat
- Robert Ozanne as Un soldat
- Robert Ralphy as Le secrétaire du procureur
- Jacques Beauvais as Le pêcheur
- Pierre Juvenet as Un invité

== Bibliography ==
- Goble, Alan. The Complete Index to Literary Sources in Film. Walter de Gruyter, 1999.
