= Annie Ducaux =

French actress

- Born: Anne Marie Catherine Ducaux; 10 September 1908; Besançon, Doubs, Franche-Comté
- Died: 31 December 1996 (aged 88); Champeaux, Seine-et-Marne, Île-de-France
- Years active: 1932–1980

Annie Ducaux (10 September 1908 – 31 December 1996) was a French actress, who appeared in 40 film and television productions between 1932 and 1980. Ducaux was a shareholder in the state theatre Comédie-Française from 1948, and played in numerous stage productions there. She is possibly best-remembered for her roles in such films as Abel Gance's Beethoven's Great Love (1937), Conflict (1938, opposite Corinne Luchaire) and Les grandes familles (1958, opposite Jean Gabin).

She was married to the Swiss film producer Ernest Rupp; they had one child, the French film producer Gérard Ducaux-Rupp.

== Filmography ==
- 1932 : Coup de feu à l'aube dir. Serge de Poligny (Irène Taft)
- 1933 : Une rencontre - short - dir. René-Guy Grand
- 1933 : Le Gendre de Monsieur Poirier dir. Marcel Pagnol (Antoinette)
- 1933 : The Fakir of the Grand Hotel dir. Pierre Billon (Suzanne Méria)
- 1933 : The Agony of the Eagles dir. Roger Richebé (Lise Dorian)
- 1934 : Little Jacques dir. Gaston Roudès (Claire Mortal)
- 1934 : Night in May dir. Henri Chomette et Gustav Ucicky (Emperess Marie-Thérèse)
- 1934 : Cease Firing dir. Jacques de Baroncelli (Françoise)
- 1935 : Un homme de trop à bord dir. Gerhard Lamprecht and Roger Le Bon (Suzanne Egert)
- 1936 : Beethoven's Great Love dir. Abel Gance (Therese de Brunswick)
- 1936 : The Two Boys dir. Fernand Rivers (Colette)
- 1937 : The Girls of the Rhône dir. Jean-Paul Paulin (Frédérique)
- 1938 : A Foolish Maiden dir. Henri Diamant-Berger (Fanny Armaury)
- 1938 : Conflict dir. Léonide Moguy (Catharine)
- 1938 : The Woman Thief dir. Abel Gance (Anita)
- 1938 : Prison sans barreaux dir. Léonide Moguy (Yvonne Chanel, the warden)
- 1940 : L'Empreinte du dieu dir. Léonide Moguy (Wilfrida)
- 1940 : Thunder Over Paris dir. Bernard Deschamps (Jeanne Desmarets)
- 1940 : The Man from Niger dir. Jacques de Baroncelli (Danièle Mourrier)
- 1942 : Colonel Pontcarral dir. Jean Delannoy (Garlone)
- 1942 : Last Adventure dir. Robert Péguy (Georgina)
- 1943 : The Inevitable Monsieur Dubois dir. Pierre Billon (Hélène Mareuil)
- 1944 : Florence Is Crazy dir. Georges Lacombe (Lucile)
- 1944 : Le Bal des passants dir. Guillaume Radot (Fabienne Ozanne)
- 1946 : Patrie dir. Louis Daquin
- 1947 : The Sharks of Gibraltar dir. Emil-Edwin Reinert (Stella)
- 1947 : Rendezvous in Paris dir. Gilles Grangier (Catherine Laurence)
- 1947 : Dreams of Love dir. Christian Stengel Marie d'Agoult
- 1949 : The King dir. Marc-Gilbert Sauvajon (Therese Marnix)
- 1950 : The Patron dir. Robert Dhéry (Agnès)
- 1958 : Les Grandes familles dir. Denys de La Patellière (Adéle Schoudler)
- 1958 : La Caméra explore le temps (TV) dir. Stellio Lorenzi episode: La mort de Marie-Antoinette Marie-Antoinette
- 1961 : La Belle Américaine dir. Robert Dhéry (Mme Lucanzas)
- 1961 : La Princesse de Clèves dir. Jean Delannoy (Diane de Poitiers)
- 1963 : Le Chevalier de Maison-Rouge (TV) dir. Claude Barma Marie-Antoinette
- 1972 : Les Femmes savantes (by Molière), telefilm directed by Jean Vernier (Philaminte)
- 1972 : Électre (TV) dir. Pierre Dux Clytemnestre
- 1975 : Les Ailes de la colombe (TV) dir. Daniel Georgeot (Maud)
- 1980 : Les Enquêtes du commissaire Maigret, episode : Maigret et les Vieillards dir. Stéphane Bertin : Jacqueline Larrieu de Saint-Phar known as Jacquette
- 1980 : La Folle de Chaillot (TV) dir. Georges Paumier (title role)
