= Beethoven's Great Love =

1936 film

- Directed by: Abel Gance
- Written by: Abel Gance; Steve Passeur
- Produced by: Michel Kagansky; Christian Stengel
- Starring: Harry Baur; Annie Ducaux; Jany Holt
- Cinematography: Marc Fossard; Robert Lefebvre
- Edited by: Marguerite Beaugé; André Galitzine
- Music by: Philippe Gaubert
- Production company: Général Productions
- Distributed by: Éclair-Journal
- Release date: 7 December 1936
- Running time: 135 minutes
- Country: France
- Language: French

Beethoven's Great Love (French: Un grand amour de Beethoven) is a 1936 French historical musical drama film directed by Abel Gance and starring Harry Baur, Annie Ducaux and Jany Holt. It portrays the career of the composer Ludwig van Beethoven. In Britain and the United States it was sometimes alternatively titled The Life and Loves of Beethoven.

It was shot at the Cité Elgé Studios in Paris. The film's sets were designed by the art director Jacques Colombier.

== Plot ==
In Vienna in the early 19th century, while Beethoven works as a musical tutor, two of his pupils are in love with him. One ends up marrying a count instead while the other spends years of unrequited love as his fiancée. Beethoven moves to Heiligenstadt to dedicate himself to his music, and overcoming his growing deafness, composes a series of masterpieces.

== Critical Response ==
The film received divided contemporary reviews. Some critics objected to Gance´s melodramatic style and the liberties taken with Beethoven's biography.

François Truffaut later defended the film in Cahiers du cinéma by stating: “there is not a single shot which does not mark a significant moment in the history of cinema.” He also praised Harry Baur´s performance.

The film's cinematic treatment of Beethoven's deafness has remained one of its most notable achievements. The director progressively removes the sounds of the external world in a sequence which places Beethoven in his daily life, within an increasingly subjective experience of silence.

== Cast ==
- Harry Baur as Ludwig van Beethoven
- Annie Ducaux as Thérèse de Brunswick
- Jany Holt as Juliette Guicciardi
- Jean-Louis Barrault as Karl van Beethoven
- Jean Debucourt as Le comte Robert Gallenberg
- André Nox as Humpholz
- Gaston Dubosc as Anton Schindler
- Sylvie Gance as La mère de l'enfant mort
- Georges Paulais as Le médecin
- Georges Saillard as Breuning
- Jean Pâqui as Pierrot
- Jane Marken as Esther Frechet - la cuisinière
- Marcel Dalio as L'éditeur Steiner
- André Bertic as Johann van Beethoven
- Roger Blin as de Ries
- Dalméras as Franz Schubert
- Lucas Gridoux as Nikolaus Zmeskall
- Yolande Laffon as La comtesse Guicciardi
- Lucien Rozenberg as Le comte Guicciardi
- Paul Pauley as Schuppanzigh

== See also ==
- List of films featuring the deaf and hard of hearing

== Bibliography ==
- King, Norman. Abel Gance: A Politics of Spectacle. Bloomsbury Academic, 1984.
