= There's No Tomorrow (film) =

1939 film

- Directed by: Max Ophüls
- Written by: Hans Wilhelm; Jean Jacot; André-Paul Antoine; Curt Alexander; Hans Jacoby; Max Kolpé; Max Ophüls
- Produced by: Gregor Rabinovitch
- Starring: Edwige Feuillère; George Rigaud; Daniel Lecourtois
- Cinematography: Eugen Schüfftan
- Edited by: Jean Sacha; Bernard Séjourné
- Music by: Allan Gray
- Production company: Ciné-Alliance
- Distributed by: Heraut Film
- Release dates: December 1939 (Algiers); 22 March 1940 (France)
- Running time: 82 minutes
- Country: France
- Language: French

There's No Tomorrow (French: Sans lendemain) is a 1939 French drama film directed by Max Ophüls and starring Edwige Feuillère, George Rigaud and Daniel Lecourtois. A number of those employed on the film were exiles from Nazi Germany. It was shot at the Joinville Studios in Paris. The film's sets were designed by the art directors Max Douy and Eugène Lourié. It premiered in Algiers in December 1939 before going on general release across France in March 1940.

== Synopsis ==
In order to support her young son, a woman becomes a dancer in a striptease cabaret act.

== Cast ==
- Edwige Feuillère as Evelyn (Babs) Morin
- George Rigaud as Dr. Georges Brandon
- Daniel Lecourtois as Dr. Armand Péreux
- Mady Berry as Mme. Midu, concierge
- Michel François as Pierre, Evelyn's son
- Georges Lannes as Paul Mazuraud
- André Gabriello as Mario
- Pauline Carton as La bonne Ernestine
- Paul Azaïs as Henri
- Jacques Erwin as Hermann
- Louis Florencie as Drunk client
- Geo Forster a sUn danseur
- Jane Marken as Mme Béchu
- Léon Roger-Maxime as Le second de Mazuraud
- René Worms as Un habitué

== Bibliography ==
- Williams, Alan L. Republic of Images: A History of French Filmmaking. Harvard University Press, 1992.
