= Daniel Lecourtois =

French actor (1902-1985)

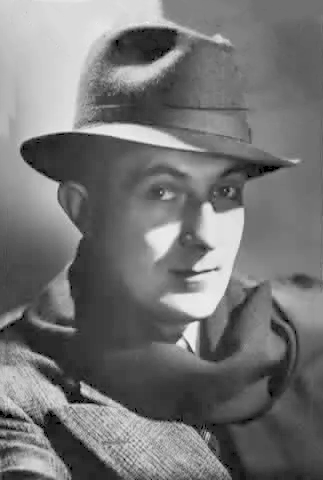
- Image of Daniel Lecourtois
- Born: 25 January 1902; Paris, France
- Died: 16 January 1985 (aged 82); Challex, Ain, France
- Other name: Daniel Paul Henri Lecourtois
- Occupation: Actor
- Years active: 1928 - 1981 (film)

Daniel Lecourtois (25 January 1902 – 16 January 1985) was a French film actor. He appeared in more than sixty films and television series during his career. In his later career he often played authority figures.

== Partial filmography ==
- Misdeal (1928) - Un danseur (uncredited)
- Checkmate (1931) - Robert Manoy
- Monsieur le maréchal (1931) - Le lieutenant Tradivot
- My Aunt from Honfleur (1931)
- The Fortune (1931) - Badoureau / Studel
- Une jeune fille et un million (1932) - Jacques
- The Beautiful Adventure (1932) - André, their son
- The Agony of the Eagles (1933) - Le jeune aristocrate
- Madame Bovary (1934) - Leon
- Iris perdue et retrouvée (1934) - Maxime de Persani
- Coralie and Company (1934) - Jacques Dufauret
- Song of Farewell (1934) - Franz Liszt
- Your Smile (1934) - Monsieur Martin
- The Green Domino (1935) - Naulin
- La Garçonne (1936)
- Les Demi-vierges (1936) - Maxime de Chantel
- The Call of Life (1937) - Le docteur Lenoir
- The Girls of the Rhône (1938)
- Golden Venus (1938) - André de Saint-Guillon
- The City of Lights (1938) - Rodolphe Davoust
- There's No Tomorrow (1939) - Dr. Armand Péreux
- Dreams of Love (1947) - Ronchaud
- Rendezvous in Paris (1947) - Le commissaire du bord
- The Man Who Returns from Afar (1950) - Le docteur Moutier
- Lost Souvenirs (1950) - Le directeur de l'hôtel
- The Man from Jamaica (1950) - Docteur Marc Heckart
- La Vérité sur Bébé Donge (1952) - Georges Donge
- Adorable Creatures (1952) - Jacques
- The Lottery of Happiness (1953)
- Alarm in Morocco (1953) - Le commandant
- Gamin de Paris (1954) - Georges Salvin
- The Possessors (1958) - Canet
- The Bear (1960) - Le directeur
- Don't Tempt the Devil (1963) - Un avocat
- The Train (1964) - Priest (uncredited)
- Comment épouser un premier ministre (1964)
- Elle boit pas, elle fume pas, elle drague pas, mais... elle cause ! (1970) - Brimeux
- The Breach (1970)
- Just Before Nightfall (1971) - Dorfmann
- Dr. Popaul (1972) - Prof. Dupont
- Wedding in Blood (1973) - Prefet / Department governor
- Stavisky (1974) - Le président de la commission d'enquête
- Verdict (1974) - Le procureur général
- Vincent, François, Paul and the Others (1974) - Georges
- Nada (1974)
- Judith Therpauve (1978) - Desfraizeaux

== Bibliography ==
- Hayward, Susan. Simone Signoret: The Star as Cultural Sign. A&C Black, 2004.
