= The Call of Life =

1937 film

- Directed by: Georges Neveux
- Written by: Georges Neveux; Rolf E. Vanloo
- Produced by: Peter Paul Brauer; Raoul Ploquin; W. Schmidt
- Starring: Victor Francen; Renée Devillers; Daniel Lecourtois
- Production companies: UFA; ACE
- Distributed by: ACE
- Release date: 21 May 1937
- Running time: 90 minutes
- Country: Germany
- Language: French

The Call of Life (French: L'appel de la vie) is a 1937 French drama film directed by Georges Neveux and starring Victor Francen, Renée Devillers, and Daniel Lecourtois. It is a French-language film made in Berlin by the German studio UFA and released in France by the company's subsidiary L'Alliance Cinématographique Européenne

== Cast ==
- Victor Francen as Le professeur Rougeon
- Renée Devillers as Jacqueline Bouvier
- Daniel Lecourtois as Le docteur Lenoir
- Jane Loury as Tante Irma
- René Bergeron as Grenier
- Auguste Bovério as Le docteur Pascal
- Mady Berry as La mère d'une malade
- Robert Arnoux as Marmousot
- William Aguet as Marec
- Raymond Aimos as Le préparateur
- Bill Bocket as Michelot
- Georges Colin as Castanier
- Lucien Dayle as Bernard
- Charlotte Dressan as La bonne
- Ginette Leclerc as Marcelle
- Frédéric Mariotti as Le patron du café
- Gaston Mauger as Un médecin
- Germaine Michel as Madame Boulicot
- Régine Poncet as Yvonne Coural
- Suzy Prim as Madame Voisin
- Georges Tourreil
- Jacqueline Vasset as Mademoiselle Pluchard
- Robert Vattier as Pièche

== Bibliography ==
- Bessy, Maurice; Chirat, Raymond (1987). Histoire du cinéma français: 1935–1939. Paris: Pygmalion. ISBN 978-2-85704-239-6.
