= Jean Wall =

French actor (1900–1959)

- Born: December 31, 1900; Paris, France
- Died: October 24, 1959 (aged 58); Paris, France
- Other name: Jean Salomon Wallenstein
- Occupations: Actor, Director
- Years active: 1932–1959 (film)

Jean Wall (31 December 1900 – 24 October 1959) was a French stage and film actor. He also directed two films.

== Partial filmography ==
- La vagabonde (1932) – Le peintre Adolphe Taillandy
- Chair ardente (1932) – Florent
- The Beautiful Sailor (1932) – Valentin
- Mariage à responsabilité limitée (1934) – Georges Lambert – l'amant
- We Are Not Children (1934) – Roger, l'ami
- The Guardian Angel (1934) – L'imprésario
- Mauvaise Graine (1934) – Le zèbre
- Lovers and Thieves (1935) – Gabriel
- The First Offence (1936) – The Zebra
- The Marriages of Mademoiselle Levy (1936) – Serge Wolff
- 27 Rue de la Paix (1936) – Furet
- Compliments of Mister Flow (1936) – Pierre
- Trois... six... neuf (1937) – Fernand
- Woman of Malacca (1937) – Le major Carter
- Durand Jewellers (1938) – Tichmeyer
- La Loi du Nord (1939) – L'avocat général
- Alone in the Night (1945) – Marcheau
- Blind Desire (1945) – Robert Ancelot
- The Temptation of Barbizon (1946) – Le juge d'instruction
- The Angel They Gave Me (1946) – Jules
- Le Bataillon du ciel (1947) – Ben Sassein
- The Beautiful Trip (1947) – Wallace
- Not Guilty (1947) – Le docteur Dumont
- The Lost Village (1947) – Tancraz
- Crossroads of Passion (1948) – Jean Claes
- Impeccable Henri (1948) – Gérard
- The King (1949) – Le Lorrain
- Just Me (1950) – Peuchat
- Bille de clown (1952) – Me Lemeunier
- It Happened in Paris (1952) – Hugo
- Rasputin (1954) – L'archimandrite Breham
- The Blue Danube (1955) – Premierminister Emser
- Frou–Frou (1955) – Jean Sabatier
- Elevator to the Gallows (1958) – Simon Carala
- Mon coquin de père (1958) – Roger Taloire
- The Possessors (1958) – Pierre Leroy
- Sunday Encounter (1958) – Saunier
- Oh! Qué mambo (1959) – Bob
- Secret professionnel (1959) – Le chirurgien-chef (final film role)

== Bibliography ==
- Goble, Alan. The Complete Index to Literary Sources in Film. Walter de Gruyter, 1999.
