= Marguerite de Morlaye =

French actress (1870–1957)

Marguerite de Morlaye (29 January 1870, Saint-Mandé –18 September 1957, Paris) was a French actress.

== Selected filmography ==
- My Priest Among the Rich (1925)
- Martyr (1927)
- A Foolish Maiden (1929)
- The Wonderful Day (1932)
- La dame de chez Maxim's (1933)
- Les yeux noirs (1935)
- The Devil in the Bottle (1935)
- The King (1936)
- Compliments of Mister Flow (1936)
- Nights of Fire (1937)
- The Green Jacket (1937)
- The Kings of Sport (1937)
- A Picnic on the Grass (1937)
- The Club of Aristocrats (1937)
- White Nights in Saint Petersburg (1938)
- The City of Lights (1938)
- Gibraltar (1938)
- Captain Benoit (1938)
- Education of a Prince (1938)
- The Patriot (1938)
- Café de Paris (1938)
- I Was an Adventuress (1938)
- Law of the north (1939)
- Beating Heart (1940)
- The Suitors Club (1941)
- Bolero (1942)
- The Lover of Borneo (1942)
- No Love Allowed (1942)
- Fantastic Night (1942)
- Strange Inheritance (1943)
- The Phantom Baron (1943)
- Florence Is Crazy (1944)
- The Murderer is Not Guilty (1946)
- Six Hours to Lose (1946)
- Goodbye Darling (1946)
- The Royalists (1947)

== Bibliography ==
- Rentschler, Eric. The Films of G.W. Pabst: An Extraterritorial Cinema. Rutgers University Press, 1990.
