= Cease Firing =

1934 film

- Directed by: Jacques de Baroncelli
- Written by: Joseph Kessel; Bernard Zimmer
- Produced by: Pierre Méguérian
- Starring: Jean Galland; Annie Ducaux; Marcel André
- Cinematography: Jean Bachelet
- Edited by: Pierre Méguérian
- Music by: Arthur Honegger; Jean Lenoir
- Production company: Azed-Film
- Distributed by: Compagnie Française Cinématographique
- Release date: 1 June 1934
- Running time: 81 minutes
- Country: France
- Language: French

Cease Firing (French: Cessez le feu) is a 1934 French drama film directed by Jacques de Baroncelli and starring Jean Galland, Annie Ducaux and Marcel André. It was based on a screenplay by Joseph Kessel highlighting the problems of ex-servicemen. The film's sets were designed by the art director Robert Gys.

== Synopsis ==
A veteran soldier has great difficulty reintegrating into civilian life after being demobbed following the end of the First World War. His attempts in new jobs ultimately end in failure. However, the support he receives from former comrades sets him on the right road.

== Cast ==
- Jean Galland as Cartier
- Annie Ducaux as Françoise
- Marcel André as Baron
- Rolla Norman as Clarac
- Roland Toutain as Fauvette
- Robert Goupil as Bontemps
- Paul Azaïs as Tutule
- Pierre Labry as Lagasse
- George Cusin as Le cul-de-jatte
- Marcel Barencey as L'homme d'affaire
- André Nox as L'homme politique
- Jean Sinoël as L'administrateur
- Georges Paulais as Le journaliste
- Maurice Cloche as Prégaille

== Bibliography ==
- Crisp, Colin. Genre, Myth and Convention in the French Cinema, 1929-1939. Indiana University Press, 2002.
- Rège, Philippe. Encyclopedia of French Film Directors, Volume 1. Scarecrow Press, 2009.
