= The Possessors =

- Directed by: Denys de La Patellière
- Screenplay by: Denys de La Patellière; Michel Audiard
- Based on: The Magnates (1948), vol. 1 of The Curtain Fall by Maurice Druon
- Produced by: Jean-Paul Guibert; Claude Hauser
- Cinematography: Louis Page
- Edited by: Jacqueline Thiédot
- Music by: Maurice Thiriet
- Release date: 19 November 1958
- Running time: 92 minutes
- Country: France
- Language: French

The Possessors (French: Les Grandes familles) is a 1958 French drama film directed by Denys de La Patellière, starring Jean Gabin, Pierre Brasseur, Bernard Blier, Jean Desailly, Françoise Christophe and Annie Ducaux. It tells the story of a forceful tycoon wholly devoted to the business he has nurtured, at the expense of his family and above all his only son. The screenplay is based on volume 1 of the novel The Curtain Fall (Les Grandes Familles) by Maurice Druon, The Magnates, which won the Prix Goncourt in 1948.

The film recorded 4,042,041 admissions in France. Gabin received the 1959 David di Donatello for Best Foreign Actor.

== Plot ==
Noël Schoudler is the autocratic head of diversified family enterprises which include a bank, a newspaper and a sugar refinery. His only son François considers the whole set-up archaic and, while his father is on a business trip to the US, starts jazzing up the staid newspaper. On his return, the father is furious and decides to teach his son a lesson. He tells François that he can have the run-down sugar business, to manage as he pleases. Painfully lacking the necessary expertise, the young man launches into enthusiastic modernisation and expansion. It is rapidly brought home to him that he needs capital, which he will have to raise.

When his father tells him he is on his own, he turns to their cousin Maublanc, a malicious playboy who for several reasons hates the Schoudlers. One immediate grievance is that he asked their newspaper to promote his latest mistress, an aspiring actress called Sylvaine, and was not only refused but Noël's devious assistant Lachaume (having just made Noël's niece pregnant) took over the young woman. Feigning helpfulness to François, Maublanc says he will arrange everything with his brokers, but in fact tells them to leak the news that the Schoudler empire has run out of capital. As this will depress the share price, his plan is to buy a controlling interest on the cheap. When the market price starts falling, François is in despair and Maublanc tells him that the only decent thing to do is to put a bullet through his head. Unfortunately, the impressionable young man does so. Noël then goes down to the stock exchange where, speaking to brokers, he reassures them that his businesses are sound. The share price soars and Maublanc's plot is foiled.

== Cast ==
- Jean Gabin as Noël Schoudler
- Jean Desailly as François Schoudler
- Pierre Brasseur as Lucien Maublanc
- Bernard Blier as Simon Lachaume
- Françoise Christophe as Jacqueline Schoudler
- Annie Ducaux as Adèle Schoudler
- Louis Seigner as Raoul Leroy
- Jean Wall as Pierre Leroy
- Julien Bertheau as Lesquendieu's father
- Daniel Lecourtois as Canet
- Aimé Clariond as Gérard de la Monnerie
- Françoise Delbart as Isabelle de la Monnerie
