= The Girls of the Rhône =

1938 film

- Directed by: Jean-Paul Paulin
- Written by: Jean des Vallières
- Produced by: Léon Beytout; René Pignières
- Starring: Annie Ducaux; Daniel Lecourtois; Alexandre Rignault
- Cinematography: Léonce-Henri Burel
- Edited by: Jean Mondollot
- Music by: Maurice Jaubert
- Production company: Société Nouvelle de Cinématographie
- Distributed by: Pathé Consortium Cinéma
- Release date: 20 April 1938
- Running time: 110 minutes
- Country: France
- Language: French

The Girls of the Rhône (French: Les filles du Rhône) is a 1938 French drama film directed by Jean-Paul Paulin and starring Annie Ducaux, Daniel Lecourtois and Alexandre Rignault. It was nominated for the Grand prix du cinéma français but lost out to Alert in the Mediterranean. The film's sets were designed by the art director Aimé Bazin.

== Synopsis ==
In the Camargue region at the mouth of the River Rhône, an impoverished aristocrat attempts to marry off his eldest daughter to a wealthy man whom she does not love.

== Cast ==
- Annie Ducaux as Frédérique
- Daniel Lecourtois as Fabregas Fils
- Alexandre Rignault as Danjou
- Pierre Larquey as Fabregas Père
- Denise Bosc as Marguerido
- Nane Germon as Rosette
- Paul Escoffier as Comte de Vauvert
- Andrée Berty as Audiberte
- Madeleine Sologne as Sara
- Teddy Parent as Victorin
- André Nicolle as Dupuis
- Maurice Rémy as Bela
- Alexandre Arnaudy as Paulus
- Charles Blavette as Sergent de ville

== Bibliography ==
- Crisp, Colin. Genre, Myth and Convention in the French Cinema, 1929-1939. Indiana University Press, 2002.
- Rège, Philippe. Encyclopedia of French Film Directors, Volume 1. Scarecrow Press, 2009.
