= Not Guilty (1947 film) =

1947 film

- Directed by: Henri Decoin
- Written by: Marc-Gilbert Sauvajon
- Produced by: Francis Cosne; Georges Dancigers
- Starring: Michel Simon; Jean Debucourt; Jany Holt
- Cinematography: Jacques Lemare
- Edited by: Annick Millett
- Music by: Marcel Stern
- Production company: Les Films Ariane
- Distributed by: La Société des Films Sirius
- Release date: 24 September 1947
- Running time: 95 minutes
- Country: France
- Language: French

Not Guilty (French: Non coupable) is a 1947 French crime drama film directed by Henri Decoin and starring Michel Simon, Jean Debucourt and Jany Holt. It was shot at the Billancourt Studios in Paris. The film's sets were designed by the art director Emile Alex.

== Synopsis ==
An alcoholic doctor, portrayed by Ancelin, accidentally kills someone when driving home intoxicated. Likely due to his knowledge of medicine, he manages to conceal the death as an accident. The situation unlocks a newfound self-confidence in the doctor which he then applies to other aspects of his life requiring repair.

== Cast ==
- Michel Simon as Le docteur Michel Ancelin
- Jean Debucourt as L'inspecteur Chambon
- Jany Holt as Madeleine Bodin
- Georges Bréhat as Aubignac
- François Joux as Le lieutenant Louvet
- Charles Vissières as L'antiquaire
- Pierre Juvenet as Gillois, le notaire
- Robert Dalban as Gustave, le patron du café
- Henri Charrett as L'inspecteur Noël
- Ariane Murator as Madame Bastard, la mère de la petite malade
- Christiane Delacroix as la femme de Gustave
- Emile Chopitel as Tournier
- Max Tréjean
- Jean Wall as Le docteur Dumont
- Jean Brunel as Refardont
- André Darnay as Maître Corneau
- Jean Sylvère as Un ami du Docteur Ancelin

== Bibliography ==
- Oscherwitz, Dayna & Higgins, MaryEllen . The A to Z of French Cinema. Scarecrow Press, 2009.
