= Sybille's Night =

1947 film

- French: La nuit de Sybille
- Directed by: Jean-Paul Paulin
- Written by: Nino Frank; Marc-Gilbert Sauvajon
- Produced by: Julien Rivière
- Starring: Lucien Baroux; Paulette Élambert; Daniel Gélin
- Cinematography: Jean Bourgoin
- Edited by: Andrée Sélignac
- Music by: Georges Van Parys
- Production company: Francinalp Films
- Release date: 5 March 1947
- Running time: 90 minutes
- Country: France
- Language: French

Sybille's Night (French: La nuit de Sybille) is a 1947 French comedy film directed by Jean-Paul Paulin and starring Lucien Baroux, Paulette Élambert and Daniel Gélin. The film's sets were designed by the art director René Moulaert.

== Synopsis ==
A young burglar and his associate, a former antique dealer, break into a great house where they encounter Sybille who has just escaped from reformatory.

== Cast ==
- Lucien Baroux as Chambon
- Paulette Élambert as Sibylle
- Daniel Gélin as Stany
- Pierre Larquey as Ancelin
- Manuel Gary as Jacques
- Odette Barencey as La paysanne
- Defresne as Le paysan

== Bibliography ==
- Rège, Philippe. Encyclopedia of French Film Directors, Volume 1. Scarecrow Press, 2009.
