= Rendezvous in Paris (1947 film) =

1947 film

- Directed by: Gilles Grangier
- Written by: Michel Duran
- Produced by: André Hunebelle
- Starring: Annie Ducaux; Claude Dauphin; Marguerite Moreno
- Cinematography: Armand Thirard
- Edited by: Andrée Danis
- Music by: Jean Marion
- Production company: Production Artistique et Cinématographique
- Distributed by: DisCina
- Release date: 12 March 1947
- Running time: 95 minutes
- Country: France
- Language: French

Rendezvous in Paris (French: Rendez-vous à Paris) is a 1947 French comedy film directed by Gilles Grangier and starring Annie Ducaux, Claude Dauphin and Marguerite Moreno. It was shot at the Studio François 1 in Paris. The film's sets were designed by the art director Roland Quignon.

== Synopsis ==
While travelling of a liner famous singer Catherine Laurence encounter a fellow passenger and falls in love. However, it soon appears that he isn't all that he claims to be.

== Cast ==
- Annie Ducaux as Catherine Laurence
- Claude Dauphin as Robert Chesnay aka Michel Trévines
- Marguerite Moreno as Honorine Leclercq
- Jean Debucourt as Raymond Aubour
- Marcel Vallée as Raoul Bedeau
- Gabrielle Robinne as Lady Mermor
- Daniel Lecourtois as Le commissaire du bord
- Paul Faivre as M. Dumas
- André Chanu as Me Villerose
- Odette Talazac as Mme Gomez
- André Wasley as Martinez
- Robert Balpo as Moussinot
- Jacques Berlioz as Morazini aka Van Goolart
- Marcel Charvey as Canet
- Jean Tissier as Ménil
- Jacqueline Carrel as Mlle Gomez

== Bibliography ==
- Rège, Philippe. Encyclopedia of French Film Directors, Volume 1. Scarecrow Press, 2009.
