= Jean Sacha =

French film director and editor (1912–1988)

- Born: 25 April 1912; Saint-Jean-Cap-Ferrat, Alpes-Maritimes, France
- Died: 15 December 1988 (aged 76); Paris, France
- Occupations: Director, Writer, Editor
- Years active: 1938–1964 (film)

Jean Sacha (1912–1988) was a French film editor, screenwriter and director. He worked as a poster artist before moving into the film industry.

== Selected filmography ==
- The Novel of Werther (1938)
- There's No Tomorrow (1939)
- The Man from Niger (1940)
- Men Without Fear (1942)
- The Exile's Song (1943)
- Don't Shout It from the Rooftops (1943)
- Florence Is Crazy (1944)
- Box of Dreams (1945)
- Christine Gets Married (1946)
- Lessons in Conduct (1946)
- Fantômas (1947)
- This Man Is Dangerous (1953)
- One Bullet Is Enough (1954)
- OSS 117 Is Not Dead (1957)
- The Adventures of Robinson Crusoe (1964, TV series)

== Bibliography ==
- Rège, Philippe . Encyclopedia of French Film Directors, Volume 1. Scarecrow Press, 2009.
