= Alexandre Rignault =

French actor (1901–1985)

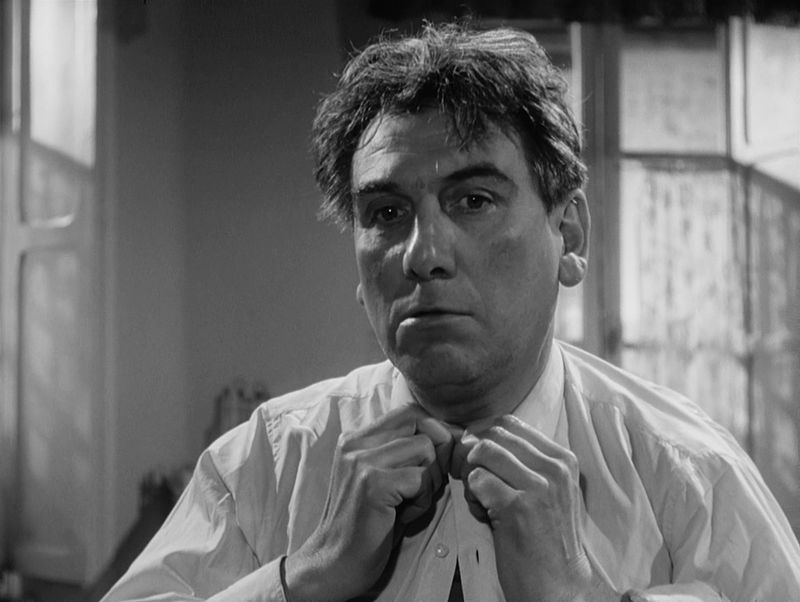
- Born: 14 February 1901; Paris, France
- Died: 2 April 1985 (aged 84); Saint-Mandé, France
- Occupation: Actor
- Years active: 1931–1985

Alexandre Rignault (14 February 1901 – 2 April 1985) was a French actor. He appeared in more than a hundred films between 1931 and 1985.

== Biography ==
He was born on February 14, 1901 in Paris 5th, at his parents' home, rue Guy-de-La-Brosse. His father was a mechanic, and his mother was a housewife. In the mid-1920s, after having worked in various professions, he desired to become an actor. Attracted to the theater, he wrote to Louis Jouvet to offer his services. Jouvet received him and hired him to play the utility in his troupe. For about fifteen years, Rignault was cast in works by Nicolas Gogol, Marcel Achard and Jules Romains, and participated in the creation of three plays by Jean Giraudoux: Amphitryon 38 (1929), Intermezzo (1933), at the Comédie des Champs-Élysées, and Ondine (1939) at the Théâtre de l'Athénée. After World War II, he was still seen in several plays, by Paul Claudel among others, presented at the Théâtre du Vieux-Colombier.

For his film debut in 1931, he played the art critic Langelard in Jean Renoir's La Chienne, a social drama with Janie Marèse and Michel Simon. Rignault, although he never had leading roles, happily played all sorts of jobs on screen: foreman, innkeeper, postman, policeman, doctor, gamekeeper, priest, notary, sharecropper, barker, peasant, etc.

He became known to the general public in 1937, playing King Henry VIII in Christian-Jaque's François Ier, starring Fernandel. From the end of the 1950s, Alexandre Rignault made frequent appearances on television. He played, among others, Count Robert de Clermont in Les Rois maudits (1972) by Claude Barma and the patriarch Gregor Kovalic in the Châteauvallon saga (1985), a role that closed his prolific career.

He is buried in the Montparnasse cemetery (25th division, large cemetery, 15 west, 6 north).

== Selected filmography ==
Film
Year	Title	Role	Notes
1931	La Chienne		
1933	A Man's Neck	Joseph Heurtin	
1933	Knock		
1933	The Orderly		
1934	The Adventurer		
1934	Liliom		
1935	Justin de Marseille		
1935	The Crew		
1937	Courrier sud		
1937	Francis the First		
1937	The Forsaken		
1938	Rasputin		
1938	The Woman from the End of the World		
1938	The Girls of the Rhône		
1939	Fort Dolorès		
1939	Midnight Tradition		
1940	Serenade		
1941	Volpone		
1942	Colonel Pontcarral		
1943	The Count of Monte Cristo		
1943	L'Éternel retour		
1943	Strange Inheritance		
1945	The Last Metro	Bourgeot	
1947	Fantômas		
1948	Ruy Blas		
1948	Memories Are Not for Sale		
1949	Emile the African		
1950	Les joueurs		
1950	Bibi Fricotin		
1951	The Lady from Boston		
1951	The Prettiest Sin in the World		
1951	Andalusia		
1952	Dans la vie tout s'arrange		
1952	Full House		
1952	Piédalu Works Miracles		
1953	The Return of Don Camillo		
1954	Leguignon the Healer		
1956	The Adventures of Gil Blas		
1959	Marie of the Isles		
1959	Quay of Illusions		
1960	Eyes Without a Face		
1962	The Gentleman from Epsom		
1964	Angélique, Marquise des Anges		
1971	Le Prussien		
1972	Figaro-ci, Figaro-là		
1972	Not Dumb, The Bird		
1975	Number Two		
