= Last Chance Castle =

1947 film

- Directed by: Jean-Paul Paulin
- Written by: Henri Troyat; Jean-Paul Paulin
- Produced by: Jean-Paul Paulin
- Starring: Nathalie Nattier; Robert Dhéry; Julien Carette
- Cinematography: Marcel Lucien
- Edited by: Renée Guérin
- Music by: Georges Van Parys
- Production company: Francinalp
- Distributed by: Les Films Lutétia
- Release date: 16 July 1947
- Running time: 85 minutes
- Country: France
- Language: French

Last Chance Castle (French: Le château de la dernière chance) is a 1947 French comedy film directed by Jean-Paul Paulin and starring Nathalie Nattier, Robert Dhéry and Julien Carette. Actress Corinne Calvet appeared in a supporting role, shorted before she found stardom in Hollywood. It was shot at the Saint-Maurice Studios in Paris. The film's sets were designed by the art director Pierre Marquet.

== Synopsis ==
Albert, a despairing man, prepares to commit suicide, but is saved by Professor Patureau-Duparc. The Professor is in need of volunteers for experiments of the new medicine he has invented which can change personalities and give people a positive outlook on life. He is taken to the castle where he flourishes under the treatment, and meets the attractive Yolande.

== Cast ==
- Nathalie Nattier as Yolande
- Robert Dhéry as Albert
- Julien Carette as Faustin
- Jean Marchat as Tritonel
- Corinne Calvet as Mme Tritonel
- Pierre Bertin as Le professeur Patureau-Duparc
- Marguerite Pierry as Mme Boze
- Odette Talazac as Une cliente
- Marfa d'Hervilly as Une cliente
- Maryse de Brandt asUne cliente
- Jacques Sommet as Un client
- Albert Michel as L'habilleur
- Luce Fabiole as Le sujet
- Danièle Franconville as Une cliente
- Louis de Funès as Bar Patrion
- Frédéric Mariotti as Un actionnaire

== Bibliography ==
- Djemaa, Pascal. Louis de Funès: le sublime antihéros du cinéma. Autres temps, 2008.
- Rège, Philippe. Encyclopedia of French Film Directors, Volume 1. Scarecrow Press, 2009.
