= Kirchberger =

Kirchberger is a surname. Notable people with the surname include:

- Christian Kirchberger (born 1944), Austrian ice hockey player
- Clare Kirchberger (1889–1960), English Anglican nun and medievalist
- Günther C. Kirchberger (1928–2010), German painter and professor
- Niklaus Kirchberger (1591–1648), Bernese politician
- Sonja Kirchberger (born 1964), Austrian actress
- Virginia Kirchberger (born 1993), Austrian footballer
