= Naughty Martine =

1947 film directed by Emil-Edwin Reinert

- Directed by: Emil-Edwin Reinert
- Written by: Jacques Companéez; Marc-Gilbert Sauvajon
- Produced by: André Hakim
- Starring: Dany Robin; Claude Dauphin; Lucien Baroux
- Cinematography: Charles Bauer
- Edited by: Victoria Mercanton
- Music by: Joe Hajos
- Production companies: Paris Film; Gaumont
- Distributed by: Gaumont Distribution
- Release date: 18 June 1947
- Running time: 105 minutes
- Country: France
- Language: French

Naughty Martine or The Fan (French: L'éventail) is a 1947 French comedy film directed by Emil-Edwin Reinert and starring Dany Robin, Claude Dauphin and Lucien Baroux. The film's sets were designed by the art director Guy de Gastyne.

== Synopsis ==
Martine, a young woman at a boarding school, invents a more exciting, romantic life for herself to impress her schoolfriends and suggests to them that she is having an affair with a famous composer Jacques Brévannes. She escapes from the school and goes to meet him in the French Alps. Soon she is torn between him and a mountain guide she encounters there.

== Cast ==
- Dany Robin as Martine
- Claude Dauphin as Jacques Brévannes
- Lucien Baroux as Le baron Saint-Yves
- Marguerite Moreno as Mme. de Stakelberg
- Henri Vidal as Pierre
- Jacqueline Cadet as Madeleine Catinat
- Robert Pizani as Le consul Alvaro Gomez
- Pierre Dudan
- Fritzi Scheff
- Rose Avril as Vocal
- Nita Berger as Vocal
- Camille Bert as Le professeur de musique
- Colette Georges
- Suzanne Grey
- Jacqueline Huet
- Albert Michel as Gustave
- Madeleine Suffel
- Lyska Wells

== Bibliography ==
- Alfred Krautz. International directory of cinematographers, set- and costume designers in film. Saur, 1983.
