= Victor Francen =

Belgian actor (1888–1977)

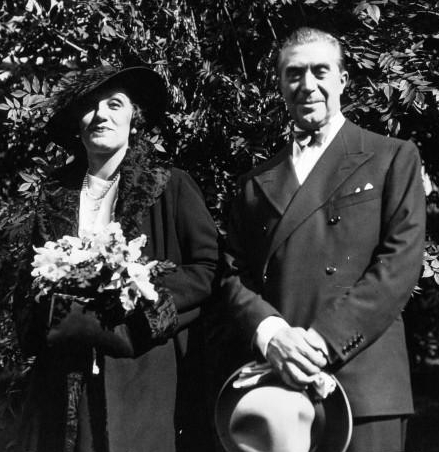
- Wedding picture with his wife actor Mary Marquet in 1934
- Born: Victor Franssens; 5 August 1888; Tienen, Belgium
- Died: 18 November 1977 (aged 89); Saint-Cannat, Bouches-du-Rhône, Provence-Alpes-Côte d'Azur, France
- Occupation: Actor
- Years active: 1921–1966
- Spouses: Eleanor Kreutzer; Renée Corciade; Mary Marquet

Victor Francen (born Victor Franssens; 5 August 1888 – 18 November 1977) was a Belgian-born actor with a long career in French cinema and in Hollywood.

== Early life ==
Francen was born in 1888 in Tienen, Belgium, the son of a chief of police.

== Career ==
According to Russian sources, he attended opera classes in Odessa before 1914.

He worked in trade in Belgium before settling in Paris, where he trained in dramatic art under Paul Mounet. His stage career in the 1920s included appearances in plays by Henri Bernstein, Georges Bataille and Edmond Rostand, which took him all over the world. After three appearances in silent films, he played the Prophet in Abel Gance's film La Fin du monde (The End of the World) (1931) and established his career as a leading man in French films.

In 1940, he was introduced to Hollywood by Charles Boyer. He appeared prolifically in American films throughout the 1940s, then made a single, final, appearance in 1954. His debut was in 1941, in Hold Back the Dawn. Among his memorable roles were as a ship's captain in Passage to Marseille (1944), an international intriguer in The Mask of Dimitrios (1944), and a French adventurer in San Antonio (1945).

== Personal life ==
Francen was married three times, his last to the actress Mary Marquet.

== Death ==
Francen died in 1977 in Saint-Cannat, Bouches-du-Rhône, France.

== Filmography ==
- Le doute (1921) – Le jeune écrivain Pierre Aubry
- Crépuscule d'épouvante (1921) – Michel Fortin
- The Snow on the Footsteps (1923) – Marc Romenay
- La Fin du monde (End of the World) (1931) – Martial Novalic
- L'aiglon (The Eaglet) (1931) – Flambeau
- Après l'amour (When Love Is Over) (1931) – Pierre Meyran
- Ariane, jeune fille russe (1932) – Constantin
- Mélo (The Dreamy Mouth) (1932) – Marcel, l'amant
- Broken Wings (1933) – Fabrège
- Le velour (1933) – Richard Voisin
- The Adventurer (1934) – Étienne Ranson
- Le chemineau (1935) – Le chemineau / The Vagabond
- Veille d'armes (1935) – Captain de Corlaix
- La porte du large (1936) – Commandant Villette
- Le roi (The King) (1936) – Le roi Jean IV de Cerdagne – en visite à Paris
- Nuits de feu (Nights of Fire) (1937) – Fedor Andreiev
- L'appel de la vie (The Call of Life) (1937) – Le professeur Rougeon
- Double crime sur la ligne Maginot (Double Crime in the Maginot Line) (1937) – Capitaine Bruchot
- Feu! (1937) – André Frémiet
- Forfaiture (The Cheat) (1937) – Pierre Moret
- J'accuse! (1938) – Jean Diaz
- Tamara la complaisante (1938) – Grigory
- La vierge folle (The Foolish Virgin) (1938) – Marcel Armaury
- La fin du jour (The End of the Day) (1939) – Marny
- Entente cordiale (1939) – Le roi Édouard VII
- L'homme du Niger (The Man from Niger) (1940) – Le commandant Bréval
- Hold Back the Dawn (1941) – Van Den Luecken
- The Tuttles of Tahiti (1942) – Dr. Blondin
- Ten Gentlemen from West Point (1942) – Florimond Massey
- Tales of Manhattan (1942) – Arturo Bellini
- Mission to Moscow (1943) – Vyshinsky, chief trial prosecutor
- Madame Curie (1943) – President of University
- The Desert Song (1943) – Caid Yousseff
- In Our Time (1944) – Count Pawel Orwid
- Passage to Marseille (1944) – Capt. Patain Malo
- The Mask of Dimitrios (1944) – Wladislaw Grudek
- The Conspirators (1944) – Hugo Von Mohr
- Hollywood Canteen (1944) – Victor Francen
- Confidential Agent (1945) – Licata
- San Antonio (1945) – Legare
- Devotion (1946) – Constantin Heger
- Night and Day (1946) – Anatole Giron
- The Beast with Five Fingers (1946) – Francis Ingram
- The Beginning or the End (1947) – Dr. Marré
- To the Victor (1948) – Police Inspector Beauvais
- La Révoltée (1948) – Henri Dumières
- La nuit s'achève (1950) – Dr. Coudray (Thiriot)
- Adventures of Captain Fabian (1951) – Henri Brissac
- Hell and High Water (1954) – Prof. Montel
- Bedevilled (1955) – Father Du Rocher
- A Farewell to Arms (1957) – Colonel Valentini
- The Indian Tomb (1959) – Penitent (uncredited)
- Fanny (1961) – Panisse's Elder Brother
- The Big Scare (1964) – Docteur Chabert
- Top Crack (1967) – Mr. Feril (final film role)
