= The Fugitive (1947 French film) =

1947 film

- Directed by: Robert Bibal
- Written by: René Jolivet
- Produced by: Lucien Masson
- Starring: René Dary; Jean Debucourt; Madeleine Robinson
- Cinematography: Léonce-Henri Burel
- Edited by: Fanchette Mazin
- Music by: Henri Verdun
- Production company: Sirius Films
- Distributed by: Sirius Films
- Release date: 5 February 1947
- Running time: 95 minutes
- Country: France
- Language: French

The Fugitive (French: Le fugitif) is a 1947 French drama film directed by Robert Bibal and starring René Dary, Jean Debucourt and Madeleine Robinson. The film's sets were designed by the art director Jacques Krauss.

== Synopsis ==
Wrongly convicted of a crime he did not commit, a man escapes from prison and goes in search of the real culprit. His hunt takes him to Canada where his former girlfriend is now living, married to a doctor.

== Cast ==
- René Dary as Fred
- Jean Debucourt as Le docteur Jacques Bréville
- Madeleine Robinson as Simone
- Alfred Adam as Bank
- Albert Dinan as Mac Gregg
- Arlette Merry as Deanna
- Pierre Dudan as Un trappeur
- Philippe Hersent as Pole
- Georges Lannes as Lechartier

== Bibliography ==
- Rège, Philippe. Encyclopedia of French Film Directors, Volume 1. Scarecrow Press, 2009.
