= Fantômas (1946 film) =

- Directed by: Jean Sacha
- Written by: Marcel Allain (novel); Jean-Louis Bouquet; Françoise Giroud
- Produced by: Hubert d'Achon
- Starring: Marcel Herrand; Simone Signoret; Alexandre Rignault; Lucienne Le Marchand
- Cinematography: Paul Cotteret
- Edited by: Monique Kirsanoff
- Music by: Jean Marion
- Production company: Latino Consortium Cinéma
- Distributed by: Ciné Sélection
- Release date: 1946
- Running time: 95 min
- Country: France
- Language: French

Fantômas is a 1946 French crime film directed by Jean Sacha and starring Marcel Herrand, Simone Signoret and Alexandre Rignault.

== The context ==
The film features the fictional master criminal Fantômas, created in 1911 by Marcel Allain and Pierre Souvestre. The tremendous popular success of the Fantômas novels led to the production of many films based on the series.

A first series of five silent films was directed by Louis Feuillade from April 1913 to May 1914. An American version of the serial was produced in the early 1920s. Shortly after the advent of sound, Paul Fejos directed a feature-length Fantômas film which combined elements from the novels and several of Feuillade's films, together with "modernized" plot twists. Two remakes/updates of the Fantômas films were produced in France shortly after the end of World War II (Fantômas, 1946, directed by Jean Sacha, and Fantomas Against Fantomas, 1949, directed by Robert Vernay). In the mid-1960s three films were made in rapid succession starring Jean Marais (of Cocteau's La Belle et la Bête) in the double role of Fantômas and Fandor.

== Plot ==
Fantômas, once thought dead, has just prevented the marriage of his daughter Hélène with the journalist Fandor, killing the mayor who was to unite them. Then he poses an ultimatum to the Minister of the Interior: he demands a billion in gold, else a million Parisians will die. Inspector Juve decides to hide Hélène and Fandor with Arthur, a former villain in whom he has confidence. Meanwhile, Lady Bentham, anxious to prevent Fantômas from committing new crimes, telephones to Juve the whereabouts of the criminal. Fandor, overhearing the conversation, follows Juve to the hideout, but is trapped by the villain. Juve soon finds him while investigating at Lord Grimsay's, where Fantômas has settled. Both men, however, manage to escape while Hélène in turn falls into the clutches of the criminal.

Fantômas destroys his secret laboratory before disappearing, then continues to assassinate passersby at random with his death ray. Following Burette, one of Fantômas' accomplices, Juve and Fandor locate the new criminal lair in the catacombs, but after killing Lady Beltham, Fantômas flees once more, taking Hélène hostage. Fandor manages to free the girl while the truck which Fantômas had boarded explodes on a mined bridge.

Fandor and Hélène finally get married but Juve, their witness, doubts the death of the Prince of Terror.

== Cast ==
- Marcel Herrand: Fantômas
- Simone Signoret: Hélène
- Alexandre Rignault: le commissaire Juve
- André Le Gall: Fandor
- Yves Deniaud: Arthur
- Françoise Christophe: la princesse Daniloff
- Georges Gosset: Burette
- Renaud Mary: Germain
- Lucienne Le Marchand: Lady Beltham
- Paul Faivre: le chauffeur
- Pierre Labry: M. Paul
- Robert Moor: Professeur Cauchard
- Denise Kerny: l'adjointe
- Marcel Lestan: Théo
- Paul Amiot: le directeur de la Sûreté
- Jacques Dynam: le préparateur
- Raymonde La Fontan: la standardiste
- Frédéric Mariotti: un ouvrier

== Bibliography ==
- Hardy, Phil (ed.). The BFI Companion to Crime. Continuum, 1997.
- Hayward, Susan. Simone Signoret: The Star as Cultural Sign. Continuum, 2004.
