= Thunder Over Paris =

1940 film by Dominique Bernard-Deschamps

- Directed by: Dominique Bernard-Deschamps
- Written by: Dominique Bernard-Deschamps; André Cayatte
- Starring: Arletty; Marcel Dalio; Annie Ducaux; Erich von Stroheim
- Cinematography: Philippe Agostini; Michel Kelber
- Edited by: Pierre de Hérain
- Music by: Marcel Delannoy
- Production company: Belgatos
- Distributed by: DisCina (France); Columbia Pictures (USA)
- Release dates: 1 April 1940 (France); 27 June 1940 (USA)
- Running time: 97 minutes
- Country: France
- Language: French

Thunder Over Paris (French: Tempête) is a 1940 French drama film directed by Dominique Bernard-Deschamps and starring Arletty, Marcel Dalio and Annie Ducaux. It was shot at the Joinville Studios of Pathé in Paris. The film's sets were designed by the art director Robert Hubert. It was filmed before the outbreak of war and released during the Phoney War period before the Fall of France.

== Synopsis ==
Korlick is a notorious confidence trickster who travels the world pulling off various schemes. After his latest swindle in New York City he returns to Paris after many years away and dreams up a new scam – selling gullible investors the idea of creating a large inland sea in the Sahara Desert by canal and the flourishing civilisation it could support. With the police again on his tail, he is about to flee as he has always done, but trapped he is forced to take shelter in the attic of Barel and old associate of his and blackmailer. Barel, assisted by his mistress the singer Ida, manages to gain money from Korlick in exchange for his assistance. However he is amazed to discover that Korlick is secretly meeting with Jeanne, the attractive young wife of Pierre Desmarets who is heading the Korlick case. Barel assumes they are lovers and seeks to use the information to his own advantage. In fact, she is Korlick's daughter and he will kill to protect her honour even as the law closes in on him.

== Cast ==
- Arletty as Ida
- Marcel Dalio as Barel
- Annie Ducaux as Jeanne Desmarets
- Erich von Stroheim as Korlick
- Henri Bry as Albert Pélissier
- Henri Guisol as Charlie
- Jacques Louvigny as Auguste
- Jacqueline Prévot as Yvonne
- Julien Carette as L'épicier
- Jean Debucourt as Gerlier
- André Luguet as Pierre Desmarets
- Blanche Denège as La buraliste
- Henri Marchand as Le badaud bègue
- Yvonne Yma as La serveuse

== Bibliography ==
- Lennig, Arthur. Stroheim. University Press of Kentucky, 2003.
