= The Lost Village (film) =

- Directed by: Christian Stengel
- Written by: Gilbert Dupé (novel); André-Paul Antoine
- Starring: Gaby Morlay; Alfred Adam; Line Noro
- Cinematography: Marcel Grignon
- Edited by: Henri Taverna
- Music by: Marcel Delannoy
- Production company: Agence Générale Cinématographique
- Distributed by: Consortium du Film
- Release date: 26 November 1947
- Running time: 95 minutes
- Country: France
- Language: French

The Lost Village (French: Le village perdu) is a 1947 French crime drama film directed by Christian Stengel and starring Gaby Morlay, Alfred Adam and Line Noro. It is based on a novel by Gilbert Dupé. The film's sets were designed by the art director Lucien Aguettand.

== Synopsis ==
The villagers of Haute-Savoie live in terror following a series of suspicious deaths.

== Cast ==
- Gaby Morlay as Angélique Barodet
- Alfred Adam as Gustave Boeuf
- Lucienne Laurence as Josette
- Line Noro as Mélina
- Noël Roquevert as Le père Landrin, un paysan
- Jean Wall as Tancraz
- Guy Decomble as Jean Pétra
- Lil Boël as La supérieure
- Léonce Corne as Le docteur
- Marcel Delaître as Rondelot
- Guy Favières as Le notaire
- Yves Furet as Arsène
- René Génin as Toubredin
- Albert Malbert as Paturet
- Maurice Marceau as Le sergent
- Johnny Marchand
- Marthe Mellot as La vieille dame
- Arlette Merry as Berthe
- Julienne Paroli as Mme Chardon
- Georges Patrix as Un montagnard
- Albert Rémy as Un montagnard
- Roger Saltel
- Maurice Schutz as Chardon
- Charles Vissières as Un montagnard

== Bibliography ==
- Rège, Philippe. Encyclopedia of French Film Directors, Volume 1. Scarecrow Press, 2009.
