= Florence Is Crazy =

1944 film

- Directed by: Georges Lacombe
- Written by: Jacques Companéez; Henri Jeanson; Alex Joffé; Jean Sacha
- Produced by: François Chavane; André Hunebelle
- Starring: Annie Ducaux; André Luguet; Pierre Palau
- Cinematography: Louis Page
- Edited by: Raymond Lamy
- Music by: Jean Marion
- Production companies: Production Artistique et Cinématographique; Éclair-Journal
- Distributed by: Éclair-Journal
- Release date: 8 November 1944
- Running time: 101 minutes
- Country: France
- Language: French

Florence Is Crazy (French: Florence est folle) is a 1944 French comedy film directed by Georges Lacombe and starring Annie Ducaux, André Luguet and Pierre Palau. It was shot at the Saint-Maurice Studios in Paris. The film's sets were designed by the art director Lucien Carré.

== Cast ==
- Annie Ducaux as Lucile
- André Luguet as Jérôme Benoît
- Pierre Palau as Monsieur Borel
- Marcelle Praince as Madame Chantelouve
- Yves Deniaud as Bianco
- Jean-Jacques Lécot as Bobby
- Eugène Yvernès as Alexandre
- André Wasley as L'inspecteur
- Lise Florelly as La bonne
- Roland Armontel as Le professeur Wonder
- Jacques Louvigny as Dieutegard
- Marguerite de Morlaye as Une dame au 'Firmament'
- Paul Faivre as Pierre Benoît
- Robert Le Fort as Le photographe
- Victor Tcherniavsky as L'accusé

== Bibliography ==
- Crisp, Colin. French Cinema—A Critical Filmography: Volume 2, 1940–1958. Indiana University Press, 2015.
- Rège, Philippe. Encyclopedia of French Film Directors, Volume 1. Scarecrow Press, 2009.
