= The Man from Niger =

1940 film

- Directed by: Jacques de Baroncelli
- Written by: Albert Dieudonné; Joseph Kessel; André Legrand; Jean Paillard (books)
- Starring: Victor Francen; Jacques Dumesnil; Annie Ducaux
- Cinematography: Léonce-Henri Burel
- Edited by: Jean Sacha
- Music by: Henri Tomasi
- Production company: SPFLH
- Distributed by: Les Films Bodalo
- Release date: 27 January 1940
- Running time: 102 minutes
- Country: France
- Language: French

The Man from Niger or Forbidden Love (French: L'homme du Niger) is a 1940 French drama film, directed by Jacques de Baroncelli and starring Victor Francen, Jacques Dumesnil and Annie Ducaux. It is set in the French colonial empire.

It was shot at the Saint-Maurice Studios in Paris and on location in Mali, then known as French Sudan. The film's sets were designed by the art director Guy de Gastyne and Robert Gys. the story was adapted from work by Jean Paillard.

== Synopsis ==
The plot is centered around a colonial officer (Victor Francen), who is stationed in French West Africa and needs to build a dam in order to enrich the local soil. He catches leprosy and has to say goodbye to his love interest.

== Main cast ==
- Victor Francen as the commandant Bréval
- Annie Ducaux as Danièle Mourrier
- Harry Baur as the doctor Bourdet
- Jacques Dumesnil as the lieutenant Jacques Parent
- Blanche Denège as Sœur Théoneste
- Georges Mauloy as François Mourrier
