= Dreams of Love (1947 film) =

1947 film by Christian Stengel

- Directed by: Christian Stengel
- Written by: René Fauchois (play); Jean Ferry; Christian Stengel
- Produced by: Adrien Remaugé
- Starring: Pierre Richard-Willm; Mila Parély; Annie Ducaux
- Cinematography: Robert Lefebvre
- Edited by: Charles Bretoneiche
- Music by: Franz Liszt
- Production company: Pathé Consortium Cinéma
- Distributed by: Pathé Consortium Cinéma
- Release date: 29 January 1947
- Running time: 100 minutes
- Country: France
- Language: French

Dreams of Love (French: Rêves d'amour) is a 1947 French historical drama film directed by Christian Stengel and starring Pierre Richard-Willm, Mila Parély and Annie Ducaux. It portrays the life of the composer Franz Liszt. The film's sets were designed by the art directors Alexandre Trauner and Robert Gys. Some filming took place at the Villa Besnard in Talloires.

== Synopsis ==
The film portrays Liszt's romantic affair with Countess Marie D'Agoult as well as his interactions with other celebrated figures of the era including George Sand. He eventually accepts the post of Kapellmeister in Weimar, bringing an end to his romance.

== Cast ==
- Pierre Richard-Willm as Franz Liszt
- Mila Parély as George Sand
- Annie Ducaux as Countess Marie D'Agoult
- Louis Seigner as Le comte d'Agoult
- Jules Berry as Belloni
- Daniel Lecourtois as Ronchaud
- Jean d'Yd as Cadolle
- Guy Decomble as Hurau
- Lise Berthier as La mère de Liszt
- Albert Broquin as Un ouvrier chez Erard
- Lise Florelly as La patronne
- Robert Le Béal as Le major Pictet
- Félix Marten
- Jean-Pierre Mocky
- Geneviève Morel as La servante
- Lucy Valnor as Fillette
- André Varennes as Erard
- Roger Vincent as Un invité

== Bibliography ==
- Raykoff, Ivan. Dreams of Love: Playing the Romantic Pianist. Oxford University Press, 2014.
- Rège, Philippe. Encyclopedia of French Film Directors, Volume 1. Scarecrow Press, 2009.
