= Jean-Pierre Teisseire =

French politician (born 1940)

Jean-Pierre Teisseire (born 31 August 1940) is a French politician. Teisseire entered local politics as a member of the Union for French Democracy party and later the Union for a Popular Movement. Teisseire's son Antonin became a champion poker player.
