= False Alarm (film) =

1940 film

- Directed by: Jacques de Baroncelli
- Written by: Michel Duran
- Produced by: Jacques de Baroncelli
- Starring: Lucien Baroux; Micheline Presle; Josephine Baker; Saturnin Fabre
- Cinematography: Jean Bachelet
- Edited by: Madeleine Bonin; Charlotte Guilbert; Ralph Habib
- Music by: Wal-Berg
- Production company: Flag-Films
- Distributed by: Societé d'Exploitation et de Distribution de Films
- Release date: 1 November 1940
- Running time: 90 minutes
- Country: France
- Language: French

False Alarm (French: Fausse alerte) is a 1940 romantic comedy drama film directed by Jacques de Baroncelli and starring Lucien Baroux, Micheline Presle, Josephine Baker and Saturnin Fabre The film's sets were designed by the art director Émile Duquesne and Eugène Lourié. It was filmed during the Phony War before the German Invasion. Delays to its release meant it was not given a full French premiere until 1945. It is also known as The French Way the alternative title it was later released under in the United States in 1952, with advertising heavily featuring American-born star Baker.

== Synopsis ==
The children of two long-feuding Paris families, who live opposite each other, fall in love. The unshakable hatred between their families threatens their hopes, but eventually the intervention of cabaret star Zazu and the wartime spirit of unity allow them to overcome their differences.

== Cast ==
- Lucien Baroux as Léon
- Micheline Presle as Claire Ancelot
- Josephine Baker as Zazu Clairon
- Saturnin Fabre as Monsieur Dalban
- Gabrielle Dorziat as Madame Ancelot
- Jean Tissier as Grégoire
- Marguerite Pierry as Mademoiselle Espérajou
- Yves Deniaud as Le journaliste
- Palmyre Levasseur as La patronne du bistrot
- Georges Marchal as Bernard Dalban
- Raymond Aimos as Honoré Petru

== Bibliography ==
- Jules-Rosette, Bennetta. Josephine Baker in Art and Life: The Icon and the Image. University of Illinois Press, 2007.
- Rège, Philippe. Encyclopedia of French Film Directors, Volume 1. Scarecrow Press, 2009.
- Sieglohr, Ulrike (ed.) Heroines Without Heroes: Reconstructing Female and National Identities in European Cinema, 1945-51. Bloomsbury Publishing, 2016.
