= Jany Holt =

Romanian-French actress (1909–2005)

- Born: Ruxandra Ecaterina Vladescu Olt; 13 May 1909; Bucharest, Romania
- Died: 26 October 2005 (aged 96); Neuilly-sur-Seine, Hauts-de-Seine, France
- Occupation: actress
- Years active: 1931–1995
- Spouses: Marcel Dalio (m. 1936; div. 1939) Jacques Porel (m. 1940)
- Relatives: Gabrielle Réjane (mother-in-law); Paul Porel (father-in-law)

Jany Holt (born Ruxandra Ecaterina Vladescu Olt, 13 May 1909 – 26 October 2005) was a Romanian-born actress, who worked principally in the French cinema.

Holt married French actor Marcel Dalio in 1936, divorcing in 1939. In 1940, Holt married author Jacques Porel, the son of stage and early silent film actress Gabrielle Réjane and director Paul Porel; Holt and Porel stayed in France during the Nazi occupation. During that period, Holt continued acting in films while she also worked with the French Resistance, later receiving the Croix de Guerre from General de Gaulle.

Holt appeared in 48 films and television productions between 1931 and 1995.

== Selected filmography ==
- The Man in Evening Clothes (1931)
- The Green Domino (1935)
- Le Golem (1936)
- The Lower Depths (1936)
- Southern Mail (1937)
- Beethoven's Great Love (1937)
- The Alibi (1937)
- Sirocco (1938)
- Rasputin (1938)
- The Phantom Baron (1943)
- Angels of Sin (1943)
- La Fiancée des ténèbres (1945)
- Farandole (1945)
- Special Mission (1946)
- Land Without Stars (1946)
- Not Guilty (1947)
- Rumours (1947)
- Counter Investigation (1947)
- Doctor Laennec (1949)
- The Ferret (1950)
- The Green Glove (1952)
- Gervaise (1956)
- A Time for Loving (1971)
- The Left-Handed Woman (1978)
- Toutes griffes dehors (1982)
- Target (1985)
