= The Marvelous Night =

1940 film

- Film poster
- Directed by: Jean-Paul Paulin
- Written by: André-Paul Antoine; Philippe Pétain
- Produced by: Denis Barthes
- Starring: Fernandel; Charles Vanel; Janine Darcey
- Cinematography: Christian Matras
- Edited by: Henri Taverna
- Production company: Prodiex
- Release date: 24 December 1940
- Running time: 70 minutes
- Country: France
- Language: French

The Marvelous Night or The Night of Marvels (French: La nuit merveilleuse) is a 1940 French comedy film directed by Jean-Paul Paulin and starring Fernandel, Charles Vanel and Janine Darcey.

== Cast ==
- Fernandel as Le berger
- Charles Vanel as Le fermier
- Janine Darcey as La jeune femme
- Fernand Charpin as L'aubergiste
- Jean Daurand as Le mari
- Milly Mathis as La paysanne
- Madeleine Robinson as La réfugiée
- Édouard Delmont as Le vieux berger
- Jean Aquistapace as Le voyageur
- Jacques Erwin as Le forgeron
- Charlotte Clasis as La servante
- Jane Marken as Mathilde, l'hôtelière
- René Fleur as L'explorateur
- Couty Bonneval
- Wanny Teers

== Bibliography ==
- Mark Connelly. Christmas at the Movies: Images of Christmas in American, British and European Cinema. I.B.Tauris, 2000.
