= Jacques de Baroncelli =

French film director

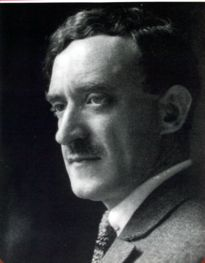
- Born: 25 June 1881; Bouillargues, Gard, Languedoc-Roussillon, France
- Died: 12 January 1951 (aged 69); Paris
- Occupations: Film director, screenwriter
- Years active: 1915–1948 (in film)
- Spouse: Marguerite de Mont de Banque
- Children: Jean de Baroncelli (1914-1998)

Jacques de Baroncelli (25 June 1881 – 12 January 1951) was a French film director best known for his silent films from 1915 to the late 1930s. He came from a Florentine family who had settled in Provence in the 15th century, occupying a building in the centre of Avignon then called the Baroncelli Palace (now the Palais du Roure). His father's side of the family were of Tuscan origin and part of the Ghibelline tradition, and they were hereditary Marquises of Javon. Though somewhat aristocratic, the family spoke Provençal, which was rather controversial at a time when it was considered to be a language of the common people. His older brother was Folco de Baroncelli-Javon,

He directed well over 80 films between 1915 and 1948 and, in the 1940s, released numerous films in the United States and Italy. One of his films, a version of the Pierre Louÿs novel La Femme et le pantin (1928) was filmed in the experimental Keller-Dorian colour process.

== Selected filmography ==
- Ramuntcho (1919)
- Roger la Honte (1922)
- Nitchevo (1926)
- The Duel (1927)
- The Passenger (1928)
- The Woman and the Puppet (1929)
- Temptation (1929)
- The Dream (1931)
- I'll Be Alone After Midnight (1931)
- The Last Blow (1932)
- Fog (1932)
- Cease Firing (1934)
- Crainquebille (1934)
- King of the Camargue (1935)
- Michel Strogoff (1936)
- Nitchevo (1936)
- S.O.S. Sahara (1938)
- Beautiful Star (1938)
- False Alarm (1940)
- The Man from Niger (1940)
- The Pavilion Burns (1941)
- Volpone (1941)
- The Wicked Duchess [La duchesse de Langeais] (1942)
- The Mysteries of Paris (1943)
- The Sea Rose (1946)
- Rocambole (1948)

== See also ==
- List of early color feature films
