= Marguerite Moreno =

French actress (1871–1948)

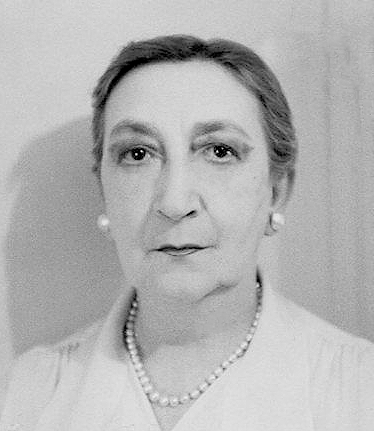
- Marguerite Moreno en 1930.
- Born: Lucie Marie Marguerite Monceau; 15 September 1871; 9th arrondissement of Paris, Paris
- Died: 14 July 1948; Touzac
- Occupation: Actor
- Awards: Chevalier of the Legion of Honour (1948)

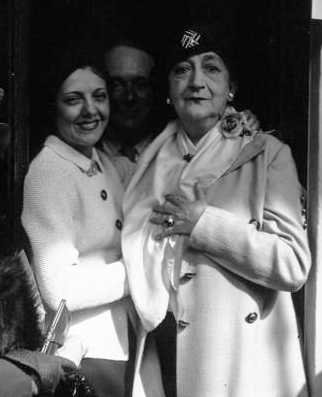
Moreno (right) with Suzy Vernon in 1934

Marguerite Moreno (born Lucie Marie Marguerite Monceau; 15 September 1871, Paris – 14 July 1948, Touzac, Lot) was a French stage and film actress.

On 12 September 1900, in England, she married the writer Marcel Schwob, whom she had met in 1895. In 1905 he died of pneumonia while Moreno was away on tour.

== Selected filmography ==
- Vingt ans après (1922) – Anne d'Autriche
- L'emprise (1924) – Madame Dubreuil
- Captain Fracasse (1929) – Dame Léonarde
- A Hole in the Wall (1930) – Arthémise
- Cendrillon de Paris (1930) – La voyante
- Paramount on Parade (1930, French version only) – Mme Béchu, la concierge
- Chérie (1930) – Mrs. Falkner
- Paris by Night (1930) – Madame Zouzou
- Dans une île perdue (1931) – Mme. Schomberg
- Alone (1931) – Eliane
- Let's Get Married (1931) – Madame Marchal
- Cinópolis (1931)
- À mi-chemin du ciel (1931) – Madame Elsie
- Lo mejor es reir (1931) – Bijou
- The Champion Cook (1932) – Mme. Dumorel
- Miche (1932) – Madame Sorbiet
- L'agence O-Kay (1932) – Ghislaine
- Cognasse (1932) – Nurse
- Mon cœur balance (1932) – Célestine
- The Porter from Maxim's (1933) – Mme. Pauphitat
- Nothing But Lies (1933) – Mme. Leverdier
- La poule (1933) – Mme. Hilmont
- The Weaker Sex (1933) – La comtesse Polacchi
- To Be Loved (1933) – Marie-Josèphe des Espinettes
- Les Misérables (1934) – La Thénardier
- Primerose (1934) – Mme de Sermaize
- Casanova (1934) – Madame Morin
- Voilà Montmartre (1934)
- L'aristo (1934) – L'ex-comtesse
- The Queen of Biarritz (1934) – La mère
- Paris-Deauville (1934) – La duchesse de Latour Lupé
- Les dieux s'amusent (1935) – Junon
- Jim la houlette (1935) – La marquise de la Verriere
- Bourrachon (1935) – Céleste Bruneau
- Charley's Aunt (1936) – Lucie d'Alvadorez
- Excursion Train (1936) – Ernestine Biscoton
- Confessions of a Cheat (1936) – La Contesse Beauchamp du Bourg de Catinax – The Countess
- Girls of Paris (1936) – La baronne de Beaupoil
- Tout va très bien madame la marquise (1936) – La marquise de Ploevic
- Let's Make a Dream (1936) – Une invitée (prologue)
- Culprit (1937) – Mme Gaude
- My Aunts and I (1937) – Tante Adèle
- Gigolette (1937) – La marquise de Mauperthuis
- The Pearls of the Crown (1937) – Catherine de Medicis (1860) – L'impératrice Eugénie âgée (1914)
- The Ladies in the Green Hats (1937) – La comtesse Tomski (La Dame de Pique)
- Boulot the Aviator (1937) – Cléôpartre de de Bérodie
- Harvest (Regain) (1937) – La Mamèche
- La fessée (1937) – Blanche de Saint-Alba
- Ces dames aux chapeaux verts (1937) – Telcide
- Four in the Morning (1938) – La Duchesse
- Les Femmes collantes (1938) – Madame Mourillon
- Barnabé (1938) – La marquise de Marengo
- L'accroche-coeur (1938) – La joueuse
- Mother Love (1938) – L'américaine sur le paquebot
- La route enchantée (1938) – La comtesse de Méricourt
- I Was an Adventuress (1938) – Tante Émilie
- Deputy Eusèbe (1939) – Émilie Bonbonneau
- Behind the Facade (1939) – La sous-directrice
- Le château des quatre obèses (1939) – Mme Heurteaux – l'espionne
- My Aunt the Dictator (1939) – La tante
- Girls in Distress (1939) – Madame Vuilliard
- Nine Bachelors (1939) – Consuelo Rodriguez
- Radio Surprises (1940) – Herself
- The Blue Danube (1940) – Maria, la cartomancienne
- Strange Suzy (1941) – La tante
- La prière aux étoiles (1941) – Madame Pedoska – la voyante de la Luna Park
- La sévillane (1943) – Pepa
- Secrets (1943) – Madame Auguste
- The White Truck (1943) – La veuve du roi
- Love Story (1943) – Madame de Bonafé
- My Last Mistress (1943) – La grand-mère
- The Ménard Collection (1944) – La romancière
- Carmen (1944) – La gitane – La zingara
- The Misfortunes of Sophie (1946) – Mademoiselle
- The Idiot (1946) – La générale Elisabeth Prokovievna Epantchine
- A Lover's Return (1946) – Tante Jeanne
- Rendezvous in Paris (1947) – Honorine Leclercq
- Lawless Roads (1947) – Hélène
- Naughty Martine (1947) – Madame de Stakelberg
- The Fan (1947) – La dame de l'au-delà
- L'assassin est à l'écoute (1948) – Mémée Renaud (final film role)

== Bibliography ==
- Benstock, Shari. Women of the Left Bank: Paris, 1900-1940. University of Texas Press, 1986
