= Jean Debucourt =

French actor (1894–1958)

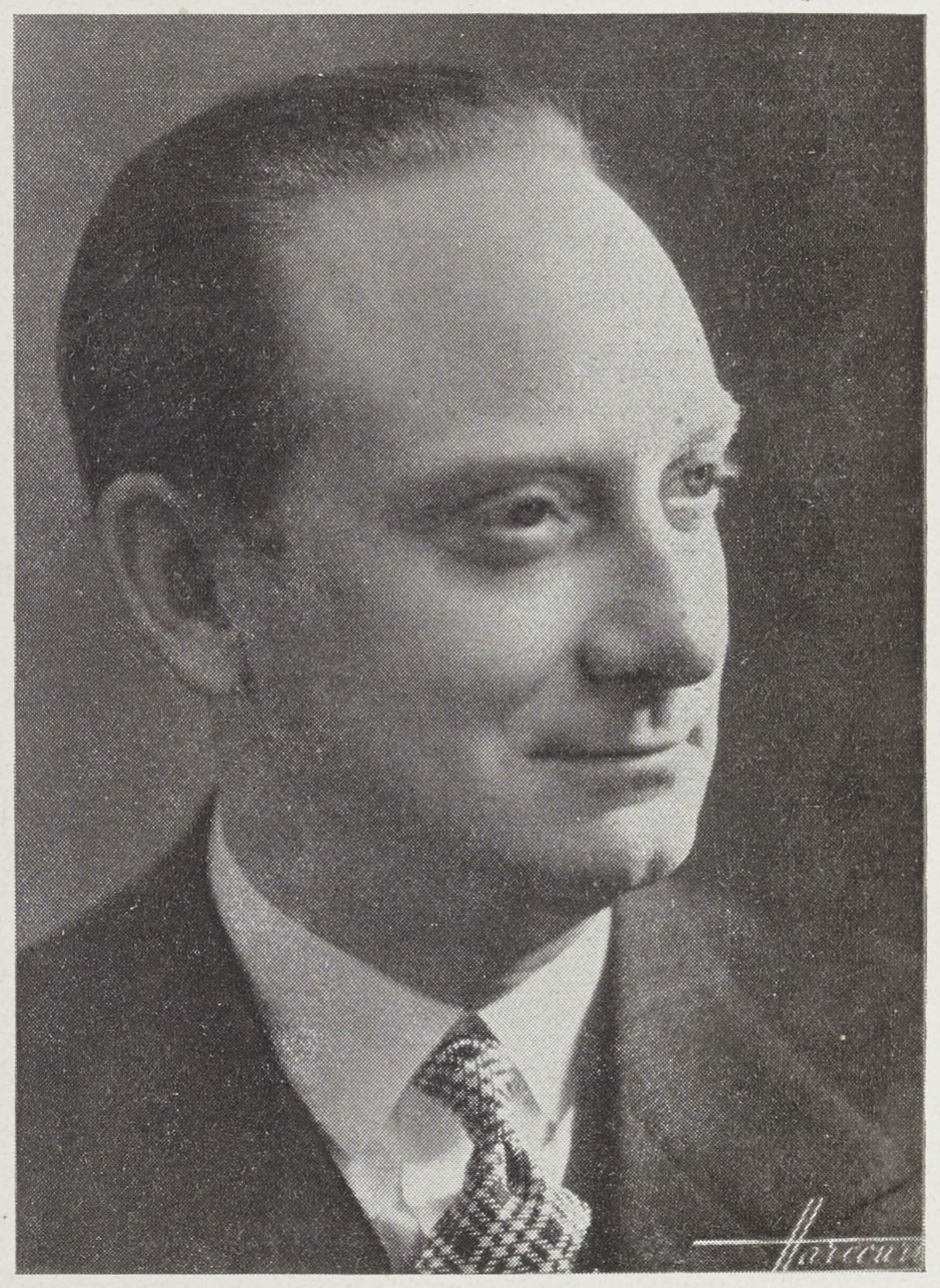
- Born: 19 January 1894; Paris, France
- Died: 22 March 1958 (aged 64); Montrouge, France
- Occupation: Actor
- Years active: 1920–1958

Jean Debucourt (19 January 1894 – 22 March 1958) was a French stage and film actor. He appeared in more than 100 films between 1920 and 1958.

== Selected filmography ==
- The Little Thing (1923)
- Jean Chouan (1926)
- Madame Récamier (1928)
- The Fall of the House of Usher (1928)
- Saint Joan the Maid (1929)
- The Agony of the Eagles (1933)
- Prince Jean (1934)
- Koenigsmark (1935)
- Bux the Clown (1935)
- Mayerling (1936)
- Wolves Between Them (1936)
- Woman of Malacca (1937)
- Beethoven's Great Love (1937)
- The Drunkard (1937)
- Sarajevo (1940)
- Thunder Over Paris (1940)
- The Trump Card (1942)
- Business Is Business (1942)
- Return to Happiness (1942)
- Love Letters (1942)
- Love Story (1943)
- Shot in the Night (1943)
- Marie-Martine (1943)
- Malaria (1943)
- The Woman Who Dared (1944)
- Her Final Role (1946)
- The Visitor (1946)
- The Idiot (1946)
- Roger la Honte (1946)
- Vertigo (1947)
- Rendezvous in Paris (1947)
- Devil in the Flesh (1947)
- The Woman in Red (1947)
- The Fugitive (1947)
- Not Guilty (1947)
- The Eagle with Two Heads (1948)
- The Eleven O'Clock Woman (1948)
- The Lame Devil (1948)
- Last Love (1949)
- The Secret of Mayerling (1949)
- White Paws (1949)
- Justice Is Done (1950)
- Prelude to Glory (1950)
- Rome Express (1950)
- Paris Vice Squad (1951)
- La Poison (1951)
- It Is Midnight, Doctor Schweitzer (1952)
- My Priest Among the Rich (1952)
- The Case Against X (1952)
- Trial at the Vatican (1952)
- The Nude Dancer (1952)
- Desperate Decision (1952)
- Jocelyn (1952)
- Leathernose (1952)
- The Long Teeth (1952)
- The Lovers of Marianne (1953)
- The Porter from Maxim's (1953)
- The Secret of Helene Marimon (1954)
- Mam'zelle Nitouche (1954)
- Huis clos (1954)
- Lord Rogue (1955)
- Men in White (1955)
- My Priest Among the Poor (1956)
- The Wages of Sin (1956)
- The Crucible (1957)
