= Jean-Paul Paulin =

French film director, producer and screenwriter (1902–1976)

- Born: 29 March 1902; Paris, France
- Died: 3 June 1976 (aged 74); Paris, France
- Occupations: Director, Producer, Writer
- Years active: 1931-1951 (film)

Jean-Paul Paulin (1902–1976) was a French film director, producer and screenwriter.

== Selected filmography ==
=== Director ===
- The Nude Woman (1932)
- The Abbot Constantine (1933)
- The Red Dancer (1937)
- The Girls of the Rhône (1938)
- Three from St Cyr (1939)
- The Path of Honour (1939)
- The Marvelous Night (1940)
- The Man Who Sold His Soul (1943)
- Sybille's Night (1947)
- Last Chance Castle (1947)
- The Voice of Dreams (1949)
- Voyage for Three (1950)
- Sweet Madness (1951)

=== Producer ===
- The Red Head (1952)

== Bibliography ==
- Goble, Alan. The Complete Index to Literary Sources in Film. Walter de Gruyter, 1999.
