= Lucien Baroux =

French actor (1888-1968)

Lucien Baroux (born Marcel Lucien Barou; 21 September 1888 in Toulouse – 21 May 1968 in Hossegor) was a French actor. He began his career working in the theatre, moving on to a long career in films from the 1930s.

In the field of musical comedy he created roles in Brummell in 1931 (Jim), Déshabillez-vous ! in 1928 (Dumontel), Passionnément in 1926 (Captain Harris), and J'adore ça in 1925 (Jacques Cocardier). He appeared as Laurent XVII in the 1935 film and 1956 recording of La mascotte.

He took part in the complete recording of Le Malade imaginaire (as Monsieur Diafoirus), in 1964 starring Michel Galabru on L'Encyclopédie Sonore Hachette.

== Selected filmography ==
- Monsieur le directeur (1925) - Ferdinand
- Son premier film (1926) - Le metteur en scène
- Tenderness (1930) - Carlos Jarry
- Levy and Company (1930) - Louis
- The Girl and the Boy (1931) - Le duc d'Auribeau
- La femme et le rossignol (1931)
- Un soir de rafle (1931) - Le Baron Stanislas
- Ronny (1931) - Theater director
- The Champion Cook (1932) - Lucien Dumorel
- You Will Be My Wife (1932) - Gustave Ménard
- Should We Wed Them? (1932) - Prof. Bock
- The Beautiful Adventure (1932) - Valentin Le Barroyer
- Le petit écart (1932) - Martial Hepmann
- One Night's Song (1933) - Pategg
- Une idée folle (1933) - Victor
- All for Love (1933) - Charlie
- Dream Castle (1933) - Ottoni, the cameraman
- Charlemagne (1933) - L'auteur
- C'était un musicien (1933) - Théophile
- My Heart Is Calling You (1934) - Rosé - le directeur
- La garnison amoureuse (1934) - Le Colonel
- Ces messieurs de la Santé (1934) - Amédée
- La jeune fille d'une nuit (1934) - Antoine
- Night in May (1934) - Monsieur Stockel
- Maître Bolbec et son mari (1934) - Rébiscoul
- Le billet de mille (1935) - Le couturier
- Le Contrôleur des wagons-lits (1935) - Eugene Bernard, director of Jupiter automobiles
- Quelle drôle de gosse! (1935) - Alfred - le maître d'hôtel
- The Mascot (1935) - Laurent XVII
- The Mysteries of Paris (1935) - Monsieur Pipelet
- Baccara (1935) - Charles Plantel
- Happy Arenas (1935) - Escopette
- The Hortensia Sisters (1935) - Monsieur Marmoud
- Charley's Aunt (1936) - William
- Une fille à papa (1936) - Victor Dupuissol alias Sylvain de la Bretière
- Une gueule en or (1936) - Le marquis de Barfleur
- Forty Little Mothers (1936) - Prosper Martin
- Adventure in Paris (1936) - Raymond Sauvaget
- Messieurs les ronds de cuir (1936) - Lahrier
- L'ange du foyer (1937) - Le baron Sigismond des Oublies
- Le porte-veine (1937) - Julien
- Four in the Morning (1938) - Bidon Durand
- Monsieur Breloque Has Disappeared (1938) - Monsieur Breloque
- Ma soeur de lait (1938) - Cyprien - le secrétaire de Jacques
- Un fichu métier (1938) - Le prince Alexis / Castin
- Remontons les Champs-Élysées (1938) - Le marquis de Chauvelin
- Behind the Facade (1939) - Le commissaire Boucheron
- Fire in the Straw (1939) - Antoine Vautier
- False Alarm (1940) - Léon
- Miquette (1940) - Monchablon
- Moulin Rouge (1941) - Loiseau
- Chèque au porteur (1941) - Fortuné
- The Woman I Loved Most (1942) - Louis Drotort, le peintre
- Prince Charming (1942) - Ambroise Bréchaud
- The Guardian Angel (1942) - Duboin
- Soyez les bienvenus (1942) - Boisleroi
- Le grand combat (1942) - Victor
- The Ménard Collection (1944) - Le conservateur du musée de mathématiques
- Échec au roy (1945) - Le jardinier La Verdure
- Sybille's Night (1947) - Chambon
- Naughty Martine (1947) - Le baron Saint-Yves
- Nine Boys, One Heart (1948) - Victor
- Brilliant Waltz (1949) - Monsieur DeBosc, impresario
- La ronde des heures (1950) - La Frite
- Prima comunione (1950) - Arcivescovo
- Banco de Prince (1950) - Hasdrubal - le chef de la sécurité
- Tapage nocturne (1951) - Armand Varescot
- Paris Still Sings (1951) - Clodomir
- Love in the Vineyard (1952) - Le commissaire Desbordes
- Pleasures of Paris (1952) - Maroni
- Three Days of Fun in Paris (1954) - Théophile Chambourcy, capitaine des pompiers
- Napoléon (1955) - Louis XVIII (uncredited)
- La villa Sans-Souci (1955) - Dr. Mallez
- Ces sacrées vacances (1956) - Le pêcheur
- Les carottes sont cuites (1956)
- Lovers and Thieves (1956) - Le médecin-chef de l'asile
- Les Truands (1957) - Le curé
- Les Misérables (1958) - Gillenormand
- Messieurs les ronds de cuir (1959) - Le père Soupe
- Le Diable et les Dix Commandements (1962) - Troussemier - l'évêque / The bishop (segments "Dieu en vain ne jureras" / "'Les Dimanches tu garderas")
