= Christian Stengel =

French film director and screenwriter (1902–1986)

- Born: 22 September 1902; Marly-le-Roi, Yvelines, France
- Died: 15 June 1986 (aged 83); Versailles, Yvelines, France
- Occupations: Director, Writer
- Years active: 1933–1957 (film)

Christian Stengel (1902–1986) was a French film director and screenwriter. Originally a bank clerk, he entered films in 1933 when he wrote his first screenplay.

== Selected filmography ==
- Crime and Punishment (1935)
- The Mutiny of the Elsinore (1936)
- The Former Mattia Pascal (1937)
- Beethoven's Great Love (1937)
- The Man from Nowhere (1937)
- The Most Beautiful Girl in the World (1938)
- The Duraton Family (1939)
- The Chain Breaker (1941)
- Secrets (1943)
- Alone in the Night (1945)
- The Lost Village (1947)
- Dreams of Love (1947)
- Rome Express (1950)
- No Pity for Women (1950)
- The Most Beautiful Girl in the World (1951)
- Explosive Vacation! (1957)

== Bibliography ==
- Rège, Philippe. Encyclopedia of French Film Directors, Volume 1. Scarecrow Press, 2009.
