= André Luguet =

French actor (1892–1979)

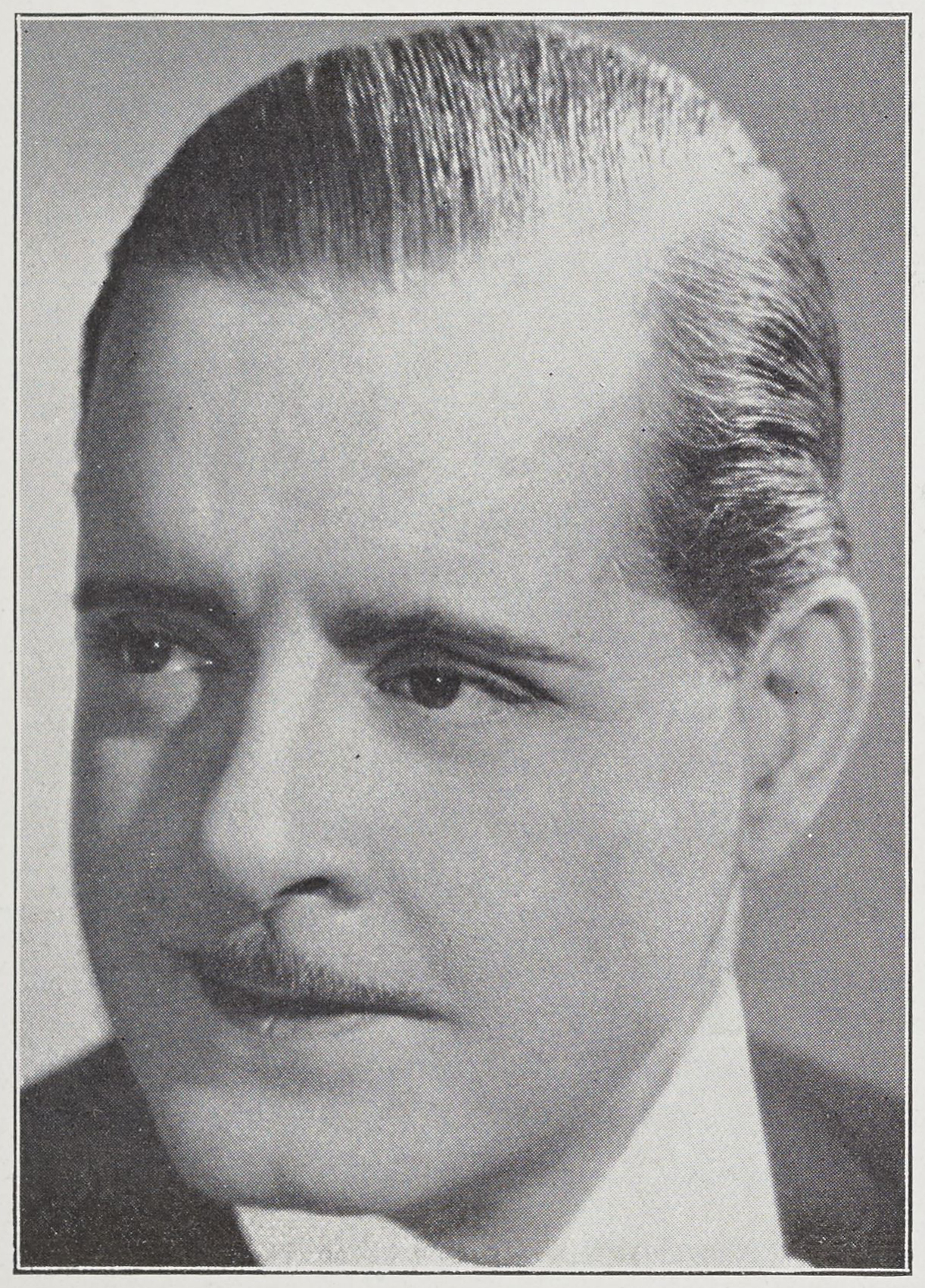
- André Luguet in 1938
- Born: 15 May 1892; Fontenay-sous-Bois, France
- Died: 24 May 1979 (aged 87); Cannes, France
- Occupation: Actor
- Years active: 1910-1970
- Children: Rosine Luguet

André Luguet (15 May 1892 – 24 May 1979) was a French stage and film actor. He appeared in more than 120 films between 1910 and 1970. He was born in Fontenay-sous-Bois, France, and died in Cannes, France. His daughter Rosine Luguet became an actress.

== Partial filmography ==
- Parisian Pleasures (1927)
- The Mad Genius (1931)
- Gloria (1931)
- American Love (1931)
- Lilac (1932)
- The Man Who Played God (1932)
- High Pressure (1932)
- Jewel Robbery (1932)
- Jenny Lind (1932)
- A Weak Woman (1933)
- Number 33 (1933)
- Once Upon a Time (1933)
- Jeanne (1934)
- The Rosary (1934)
- Samson (1936)
- Alexis, Gentleman Chauffeur (1938)
- Girls in Distress (1939)
- Thunder Over Paris (1940)
- Beating Heart (1940)
- The Last of the Six (1941)
- Bolero (1942)
- Chiffon's Wedding (1942)
- The Woman I Loved Most (1942)
- Arlette and Love (1943)
- The Man Who Sold His Soul (1943)
- Mademoiselle Béatrice (1943)
- The Inevitable Monsieur Dubois (1943)
- Florence Is Crazy (1944)
- Mademoiselle X (1945)
- Farandole (1945)
- Six Hours to Lose (1946)
- Happy Lucky (1946)
- The Patron (1950)
- The Father of the Girl (1953)
- The Lovers of Marianne (1953)
- The Two Orphans (1954)
- Madame du Barry (1954)
- The French, They Are a Funny Race (1955)
- It Happened in Aden (1956)
- Une Parisienne (1957)
- The Roots of Heaven (1958)
- Women Are Like That (1960)
- Paris Blues (1961)
- Love Is a Ball (1963)
- Un monsieur de compagnie (Male Companion) (1964)
- Pleins feux sur Stanislas (1965)
- The Second Twin (1966)
- Les Rois maudits (1972) as Hugues de Bouville
