= Jacques Grello =

French singer and actor

- Born: 28 April 1915; Saint-Ouen, Seine, France
- Died: 8 March 1978 (aged 62); Paris, France
- Occupations: Actor, singer

Jacques Grello (1915–1978) was a French singer and film actor. He presented the satirical TV show La Boîte à sel (1955-1960).

== Selected filmography ==
- 1943 : Madame et le mort by Louis Daquin as L'employé aux Objets Trouvés
- 1949 : My Aunt from Honfleur by René Jayet
- 1951 : La Vie chantée by Noël-Noël
- 1952 : Women Are Angels by Marcel Aboulker as Léon Clotier
- 1953 : Women of Paris by Jean Boyer as Le commentateur du ballet
- 1957 : Pot-Bouille by Julien Duvivier as Auguste Vabre
- 1957: Lovers of Paris, by Julien Duvivier as Théophile Vabre
- 1959: The Bureaucrats by Henri Diamant-Berger as Chavarax
- 1963 : La Foire aux cancres by Louis Daquin as the antiquarèy
- 1972 : Le Viager by Pierre Tchernia as the centenarian (uncredited)

== Theatre ==
- 1951: Edmée by Pierre-Aristide Bréal, directed by Georges Vitaly, Théâtre de la Huchette
- 1953: Les Hussards by Pierre-Aristide Bréal, directed by Jacques Fabbri, Théâtre des Noctambules
- 1954: Les Hussards by Pierre-Aristide Bréal, directed by Jacques Fabbri, Théâtre des Célestins
- 1957: La terre est basse by Alfred Adam, directed by Georges Vitaly, Théâtre La Bruyère
- 1958: Édition de midi by Mihail Sebastian, directed by René Dupuy, Théâtre Gramont
- 1961: Moulin à poivre by Robert Rocca and Jacques Grello, directed by Jacques Mauclair, Les Trois Baudets
- 1968: La Courte Paille hy Jean Meyer, directed by the author
- 1972: Lidoire by Georges Courteline, directed by Jean Meyer, Maison des Jeunes Cachan

== Bibliography ==
- Goble, Alan. The Complete Index to Literary Sources in Film. Walter de Gruyter, 1999.
