= Jean Guitton (dramatist) =

French playwright and screenwriter

- Born: 29 March 1887
- Died: 8 April 1973 (aged 86); Juan-les-Pins (Alpes-Maritimes).
- Occupations: dramatist, librettist, lyricist and screenwriter
- Years active: 1926 - 1963

Jean Guitton (29 March 1887 - 8 April 1973) was a French dramatist, librettist, lyricist and screenwriter.

== Filmography ==
- Les Dévoyés, directed by Henri Vorins (France, 1926, based on the play La Nuit du 3)
- Jim la Houlette, roi des voleurs, directed by Nicolas Rimsky and Roger Lion (France, 1926, based on the play Jim la Houlette, roi des voleurs)
- On a trouvé une femme nue, directed by Léo Joannon (France, 1934, based on the play On a trouvé une femme nue)
- Jim la Houlette, directed by André Berthomieu (France, 1935, based on the play Jim la Houlette, roi des voleurs)
- Les Maris de ma femme, directed by Maurice Cammage (France, 1937, based on the play Fallait pas m'écraser)
- Forty Little Mothers, directed by Busby Berkeley (1940, remake of the 1936 film Forty Little Mothers)
- Le Martyr de Bougival, directed by Jean Loubignac (France, 1949, based on the play Et la police n'en savait rien)
- One Hundred Little Mothers, directed by Giulio Morelli (Italy, 1952, remake of the 1936 film Forty Little Mothers)
- The Priest of Saint-Amour, directed by Émile Couzinet (France, 1952, based on the play Le Curé de Saint-Amour)
- Le Plus Heureux des hommes, directed by Yves Ciampi (France, 1952, based on the play Je l'aimais trop)
- Au diable la vertu, directed by Jean Laviron (France, 1953, based on the play Elle attendait ça)
- Quintuplets in the Boarding School, directed by René Jayet (France, 1953, loose remake of the 1936 film Forty Little Mothers)
- Légère et court vêtue, directed by Jean Laviron (France, 1953, based on the play Un amour fou)
- Une nuit aux Baléares, directed by Paul Mesnier (France, 1957, based on the operetta Une nuit aux Baléares)

=== Screenwriter ===
- 1930: The Prosecutor Hallers, by Robert Wiene
- 1931: The Man at Midnight, by Harry Lachman
- 1932: Mise en plis, by Jacques Desagneaux
- 1932: Il a été perdu une mariée, by Léo Joannon
- 1933: The Invisible Woman, by Georges Lacombe
- 1934: Rothchild, by Marco de Gastyne
- 1936: Les Gaîtés de la finance, by Jack Forrester
- 1936: Forty Little Mothers, by Léonide Moguy
- 1937: The Club of Aristocrats, by Pierre Colombier
- 1937: The Kings of Sport, by Pierre Colombier
- 1937: Le Porte-veine, by André Berthomieu
- 1938: Monsieur Breloque Has Disappeared, by Robert Péguy
- 1938: La Goualeuse, by Fernand Rivers
- 1941: The Acrobat, by Jean Boyer
- 1943: Feu Nicolas, by Jacques Houssin
- 1948:Woman Without a Past, by Gilles Grangier
- 1949: My Aunt from Honfleur, by René Jayet
- 1950: Le Gang des tractions-arrière, by Jean Loubignac
- 1956: Coup dur chez les mous, by Jean Loubignac
- 1963: The Bamboo Stroke, by Jean Boyer

== Operettas ==
- 1919: Chaste Suzy
- 1920: Clo-Clo
- 1928: L'Hostellerie de la vertu
- 1930: Six filles à marier
- 1931: Couss-Couss
- 1954: Une nuit aux Baléares. Operetta (with Loulou Gasté and Géo Koger)

== Plays ==
- 1924 : On a trouvé une femme nue. Comedy in three acts (with André Birabeau). Premiered in Paris at the Théâtre des Nouveautés
- 1924 : La Nuit du 3. Drama in four acts. Premiered in Paris at the Eldorado
- 1926 : Jim la Houlette, roi des voleurs. Play in three acts
- 1935 : Fallait pas m'écraser. Vaudeville in two acts. Premiered in Paris at the Théâtre de la Renaissance
- 1936 : Elle attendait ça. Vaudeville in three acts. Premiered in Paris at the Théâtre du Palais-Royal
- 1945 : Un amour fou. Vaudeville in three acts
- 1949 : Et la police n'en savait rien. Premiered in Paris at the Théâtre Sarah Bernhardt
- 1951 : Je l'aimais trop. Comedy in three acts. Premiered in Paris at the Théâtre Saint-Georges
- Before 1952 : Le Curé de Saint-Amour. Play in three acts
