= The Bureaucrats =

The Bureaucrat(s) may refer to:

- The Bureaucrats (1936 film), a French film
- The Bureaucrats (1959 film), a film by Henri Diamant-Berger and Charles Van Enger
- The Bureaucrats (Les employés The Government Clerks, 1841) unfinished work by Honoré de Balzac
- Officialdom Unmasked ("The Bureaucrats: A Revelation"), a Chinese novel
- The Bureaucrat, a 1944 novelette by Malcolm Jameson
- The Bureaucrat, Inc., a 2004 acquisition by Logistics Management Institute

== See also ==
- Bureaucrat
