= Albert Rieux =

French stage and film actor

- Born: Antoine Raymond Jean Albert Rieux; 6 October 1914; Albi
- Died: 15 April 1983 (aged 68); Argelès-Gazost (Hautes-Pyrénées)
- Occupations: stage and film actor

Albert Rieux (6 October 1914 – 15 April 1983) was a French stage and film actor.

== Filmography ==
=== Cinema ===
- 1942 : Andorra ou les hommes d'airain, by Émile Couzinet as Nyerro
- 1942 : Twisted Mistress, by André Cayatte as Rigaux
- 1943 : Le Brigand gentilhomme, by Émile Couzinet as Vicente
- 1950 : The Girl from Maxim's, by Marcel Aboulker

=== Television ===
- 1974: Gil Blas de Santillane, TV serial created by Guy Kerner, Albert Rieux and Robert Vattier, directed by Jean-Roger Cadet

== Theatre ==
=== Author ===
- 1958 : Gonzalo sent la violette by Albert Rieux and Robert Vattier, directed by Maurice Teynac, Théâtre Saint-Georges

=== Comedian ===
- 1950 : Les Maîtres Nageurs by Marcel Franck, directed by Émile Dars, Théâtre des Célestins
- 1952 : La Feuille de vigne by Jean Bernard-Luc, directed by Pierre Dux, Théâtre de la Madeleine
- 1953 : La Feuille de vigne by Jean Bernard-Luc, directed by Pierre Dux, Théâtre des Célestins
- 1953 : Le Voyageur sans bagage by Jean Anouilh, directed by Georges Pitoeff, Théâtre des Célestins
- 1954 : La Maison de la nuit by Thierry Maulnier, directed by Marcelle Tassencourt & Michel Vitold, Théâtre des Célestins
- 1955 : Affaire vous concernant by Jean-Pierre Conty, directed by Pierre Valde, Théâtre des Célestins
- 1956 : La Tour de Nesle by Frédéric Gaillardet after Alexandre Dumas, directed by Jean Le Poulain, Théâtre des Mathurins in Paris
- 1956 : La Femme du siècle by Claude Schnerb, directed by Jacques-Henri Duval, Théâtre des Célestins
- 1957 : Marie Tudor by Victor Hugo, directed by Jean Vilar, Théâtre des Célestins
- 1957 : Jupiter by Robert Boissy, directed by Jacques-Henri Duval, Théâtre des Célestins
- 1958 : La Mouche bleue by Marcel Aymé, directed by Claude Sainval, Théâtre des Célestins
- 1959 : Ange le Bienheureux by Jean-Pierre Aumont, directed by Jacques Charon, Théâtre des Célestins
- 1960 : Un ange qui passe by Pierre Brasseur, directed by de l'auteur, Théâtre des Célestins
- 1960 : Léocadia by Jean Anouilh, directed by Roland Piétri, Théâtre des Célestins
- 1961 : The Condemned of Altona by Jean-Paul Sartre, directed by François Darbon, Théâtre des Célestins
- 1961 : Jean de la Lune by Marcel Achard, directed by Pierre Dux, Théâtre des Célestins
- 1963 : Le Misanthrope by Molière, directed by Pierre Dux, Théâtre des Célestins
- 1964 : Mon Faust by Paul Valéry, directed by Pierre Franck, Théâtre des Célestins
- 1965 : Chat en poche by Georges Feydeau, directed by Jean-Laurent Cochet, Théâtre des Célestins, tournée Herbert-Karsenty
- 1967 : Croque-monsieur by Marcel Mithois, directed by Jean-Pierre Grenier, Théâtre des Célestins
- 1967 : Adorable Julia by Marc-Gilbert Sauvajon after Somerset Maugham, directed by Jean-Laurent Cochet, Théâtre des Célestins, tournée Herbert-Karsenty
- 1968 : Fanny by Marcel Pagnol, directed by Henri Vilbert, Théâtre des Célestins
- 1969 : Quoat-Quoat by Jacques Audiberti, mise scène Georges Vitaly, Théâtre des Célestins
- 1969 : Pygmalion by George Bernard Shaw, directed by Pierre Franck, Théâtre des Célestins
- 1970 : A Flea in Her Ear by Georges Feydeau, directed by Jacques Charon, Théâtre des Célestins
- 1971 : Croque-monsieur by Marcel Mithois, directed by Jean-Pierre Grenier, Théâtre des Célestins
- 1971 : Une fille dans ma soupe by Terence Frisby, adaptation Marcel Moussy, Théâtre des Célestins
- 1972 : Un sale égoïste by Françoise Dorin, directed by Michel Roux, Théâtre des Célestins
- 1972 : Le Faiseur by Honoré de Balzac, directed by Pierre Franck, Théâtre Montansier, Théâtre des Célestins, tournée
- 1976 : Le Médecin malgré lui by Molière, directed by Jean Meyer, Théâtre des Célestins, Théâtre de Boulogne-Billancourt
- 1977 : Le Scénario by Jean Anouilh, directed by Jean Anouilh & Roland Piétri, Théâtre des Célestins, tournée Herbert-Karsenty
- 1979 : Les Vignes du seigneur by Robert de Flers and Francis de Croisset, directed by Francis Joffo, Théâtre des Célestins
