= A Love Under an Umbrella =

- Directed by: Jean Laviron
- Written by: Paul Armont
- Starring: Louis de Funès
- Music by: André Lavagne
- Release date: 1951
- Running time: 53 minutes
- Country: France
- Language: French

A Love Under an Umbrella French: Un amour de parapluie, is a French short cinema film from 1950, directed by Jean Laviron, written by Paul Armont, and starring by Jacques-Henry Duval. It also features an uncredited performance by Louis de Funès.

== Cast ==
- Jacques-Henry Duval: Canadian tourist
- Noël Roquevert: Canadian tourist
- Denise Provence: female Canadian tourist
- Armand Bernard
- Robert Berri
- Louis de Funès
- Lucienne Granier
- André Numès Fils
- Marion Tourès
- Geneviève Morel
