= Albert Rémy =

French actor

- Born: 9 April 1915; Sèvres, France
- Died: 26 January 1967 (aged 51); Paris, France
- Occupation: Actor
- Years active: 1943–1967

Albert Rémy (French pronunciation: [albɛʁ ʁemi]; 9 April 1915 – 26 January 1967) was a French actor best known for his supporting roles in François Truffaut's first two feature films. He played Antoine Doinel's father in The 400 Blows and Charlie Kohler's (Charles Aznavour) brother in Shoot the Piano Player. He also appeared in Marcel Carné's Les Enfants du Paradis, John Frankenheimer's The Train and René Clément's Is Paris Burning?

== Selected filmography ==
- Strange Inheritance (1943) - L'ivrogne (uncredited)
- It Happened at the Inn (1943) - Jean des Goupi
- Madame et le Mort (1943) - Henri
- Goodbye Leonard (1943) - Le marchand d'oiseaux
- Love Story (1943) - Le sacristain (uncredited)
- The Woman Who Dared (1944) - Marcel
- Children of Paradise (1945) - Scarpia Barrigni
- The Black Cavalier (1945) - Pinte
- La Boîte aux rêves (1945)
- François Villon (1945) - Perrot
- La part de l'ombre (1945)
- La Fille du diable (1946) - Clément
- Devil in the Flesh (1947) - Le sacristain
- Les Amants du pont Saint-Jean (1947) - Le beau-frère du noyé
- The Lost Village (1947) - Un montagnard
- The Charterhouse of Parma (1948)
- Parade du rire (1948) - Piton
- Impeccable Henri (1948) - Gustave
- Croisière pour l'inconnu (1948) - Albert
- Ronde de nuit (1949) - L'homme nu
- All Roads Lead to Rome (1949) - Edgar
- Skipper Next to God (1951) - Le cuistot
- Alone in Paris (1951) - Arthur
- Une fille dans le soleil (1953) - Vergèze
- Les amours finissent à l'aube (1953) - Picard, un employé du garage
- Au diable la vertu (1953) - Henri
- Légère et court vêtue (1953) - Henri (uncredited)
- Virgile (1953) - Bastien
- Minuit... Champs-Élysées (1954) - Etienne
- Wild Fruit (1954) - Louis
- Before the Deluge (1954) - Le garçon de café
- La bella Otero (1954) - Un sergent de ville
- Razzia sur la chnouf (1955) - Bibi
- French Cancan (1955) - Barjolin
- Je suis un sentimental (1955) - Ledoux
- The Affair of the Poisons (1955) - Le bourreau Guillaume
- Les Hussards (1955) - Un hussard (uncredited)
- Elena and Her Men (1956) - Buchez
- Paris, Palace Hotel (1956) - Le ronfleur du commissariat
- Crime and Punishment (1956) - L'inspecteur Renaud
- The Hunchback of Notre Dame (1956) - Jupiter
- Que les hommes sont bêtes (1957) - L'inspecteur
- Escapade (1957) - José
- Les Truands (1957) - L'agent de police
- Rafles sur la ville (1958) - Auguste, dit "Gus"
- Police judiciaire (1958) - L'inspecteur Valentin
- Miss Pigalle (1958)
- In Case of Adversity (1958) - Le commissaire à la préfecture (uncredited)
- Cigarettes, whisky et p'tites pépées (1959)
- The 400 Blows (1959) - Julien Doinel
- The Cow and I (1959) - Colinet - prisonnier de guerre dans la scierie
- Pantalaskas (1960) - Georges Battistini
- Dialogue of the Carmelites (1960) - Un sans-culotte
- Tomorrow Is My Turn (1960)
- Shoot the Piano Player (1960) - Chico Saroyan
- Le Caïd (1960) - Bob (uncredited)
- The Black Monocle (1961) - Mérignac - le bibliothécaire
- Four Horsemen of the Apocalypse (1962) - François
- Lafayette (1962) - Louis XVI
- The Seventh Juror (1962) - Police Superintendent
- Portrait-robot (1962)
- Gigot (1962) - Alphonse
- Five Miles to Midnight (1962) - L'inpecteur
- Mandrin (1962) - Grain de sel
- A King Without Distraction (1963) - Le maire
- La foire aux cancres (Chronique d'une année scolaire) (1963) - Le serrurier
- Bebert and the Train (1963) - Le Brigadier Belissard
- Behold a Pale Horse (1964) - (uncredited)
- The Train (1964) - Didont
- Weekend at Dunkirk (1964) - Virrel
- Mata Hari, Agent H21 (1964) - Adam Zelle, Mata Hari's Father
- Cent briques et des tuiles (1965) - Etienne
- How to Keep the Red Lamp Burning (1965) - Inspecteur Graunu (segment "Bons vivants, Les")
- Is Paris Burning? (1966) - Policeman / Le gendarme
- Grand Prix (1966) - Surgeon
- La Vingt-cinquième Heure (1967) - Joseph Grenier (posthumous release)
- An Idiot in Paris (1967) - Rabichon, le restaurateur (posthumous release)
- Shock Troops (1967) - Emile (posthumous release)
- The Oldest Profession (1967) - Frenchman with 2 sous (segment "Mademoiselle Mimi") (uncredited) (final film role, posthumous release)
