= Lucienne Granier =

Lucienne Granier (29 November 1923 in Béziers – 30 October 2005 idem) was a French actress.

== Filmography ==
- 1949: Jean de la Lune by Marcel Achard as Étiennette
- 1949: Keep an Eye on Amelia by Claude Autant-Lara as Palmyre
- 1951: Un amour de parapluie, short film by Jean Laviron
- 1951: The Straw Lover by Gilles Grangier as la dame en noir
- 1953: The Secret of Helene Marimon by Henri Calef as Mme Delabarre
- 1953: Royal Affairs in Versailles by Sacha Guitry as Mme de Senlis
- 1955: Caroline and the Rebels by Jean Devaivre
- 1956: If Paris Were Told to Us by Sacha Guitry as la provinciale
