= Baxter (film) =

- French theatrical release poster
- Directed by: Jérôme Boivin
- Written by: Jérôme Boivin; Jacques Audiard
- Produced by: Patrick Godeau; Ariel Zeitoun
- Starring: Lise Delamare; Catherine Ferrain; Bella Sana
- Cinematography: Yves Angelo
- Edited by: Marie-Josée Audiard
- Music by: Marc Hillman; Patrick Roffé
- Production companies: MK2 Productions; Alicéléo; Gérard Mital Productions
- Distributed by: P.C.C.
- Release date: 18 January 1989
- Running time: 82 minutes
- Country: France
- Language: French

Baxter is a 1989 French black comedy film directed by Jérôme Boivin. The film is based on the novel Hell Hound (1977) by Ken Greenhall (under the pseudonym Jessica Hamilton). The titular character is a murderous white Bull Terrier who voice-over narrates his observations of the world around him as he shifts between various masters.

== Plot ==
Baxter, a Bull Terrier, narrates the story of his "former life" in the pens, before he is given to an old woman. Baxter hates the old woman's bland lifestyle and reacts to her habits with disgust. In contrast, he becomes obsessed with the young couple across the street as he observes their nightly sex sessions. Baxter attempts to communicate his dominance over the old woman by causing her to stumble, but his plan backfires. The old woman's condition deteriorates, and ultimately Baxter kills her in order to be adopted by the young couple.

Baxter enjoys his life with the young couple, splitting his time between the sensual woman and the earthy man. He brings them dead animals in an attempt to show them who he is. His idyll is broken when the couple has a baby and begins to neglect him. Baxter hates the weak and helpless child. He attempts to kill it, but his plans again backfire. Ignorant of Baxter's murderous intentions, the couple gives Baxter to a neighborhood boy.

Baxter thrills under the firm hand of his new master, a budding sociopath and Hitler fanatic. The boy begins to see a girl from his school who reminds him of Eva Braun. Baxter impregnates the girl's spaniel, though his own sexuality disgusts him. Later Baxter kills a stray dog to show the boy who he is, and Baxter believes that they come to a mutual understanding. When the boy commands Baxter to kill a classmate, Baxter refuses and realizes that the boy does not understand him after all.

The girl's spaniel gives birth to puppies, and Baxter reacts to them with mixed emotions. In an attempt to emulate the final days of Hitler, the boy kills the puppies. In reaction, Baxter decides that the boy must die. The boy attacks first, but Baxter manages to gain the upper hand. When the boy commands him to heel, Baxter finds that he cannot disobey, allowing the boy to kill him. Later, the boy breaks into the old lady's abandoned house and observes the young couple across the street. In a monologue narration echoing Baxter's, the boy plans to kill his parents and be adopted by the couple.

== Cast ==
- Maxime Leroux as Baxter (voiceover)
- Lise Delamare as Madame Deville
- Bella Sana as Young Barbara
- Catherine Ferran as Florence
- Jacques Spiesser as Michel Ferrer
- Jean Mercure as Monsieur Cuzzo
- Jean-Paul Roussillon as Joseph Barsky
- Sabrina Leurquin as Noelle
- Daniel Rialet as Jean
- Evelyne Didi as Marie Cuzzo
- Rémy Carpenter as Roger Morel
- Jany Gastaldi as Anne Ferrer

== Release ==
=== Home media ===
Baxter was released on DVD for the first time by Lionsgate on 17 July 2007.

On 18 May 2021, Baxter was re-released on Blu-ray by Scorpion Releasing. The Blu-ray release included a new audio commentary track voiced by Mark Savage.

== Reception ==
Baxter received mostly positive reviews from critics upon its release. Hal Hinson of The Washington Post praised the film's atmosphere, and title character, but criticized the film's uninteresting human characters. Marc Savlov from Austin Chronicle awarded the film 3.5 out of 5 stars, writing, "Baxter, like its bullet-snouted star, is a tight, wiry little film, by turns both comic and chilling." TV Guide gave the film three out of five stars, calling it "an extremely bleak, nihilistic and occasionally horrifyingly graphic depiction of all that can possibly go sour between a pet dog and his various human masters." The reviewer praised the film's direction, screenplay, performances, and title canine.

Bill Gibron from DVD Talk rated the film two out of five stars, stating that he "found nothing entertaining or enlightening about this meandering mean spirited mess".
