= Twisted Mistress =

- Directed by: André Cayatte
- Written by: André Cayatte; Michel Duran
- Based on: La Fausse Maîtresse by Honoré de Balzac
- Produced by: Alfred Greven
- Starring: Danielle Darrieux; Lise Delamare
- Cinematography: Robert Lefebvre
- Music by: Maurice Yvain
- Production company: Continental Films
- Distributed by: L'Alliance Cinématographique Européenne
- Release date: 14 August 1942 (Paris)
- Running time: 85 minutes
- Country: France
- Language: French

Twisted Mistress (French: La fausse maîtresse) is a 1942 French comedy film directed by André Cayatte and starring Danielle Darrieux and Lise Delamare. It is inspired by the 1841 novel La Fausse Maîtresse by Honoré de Balzac. It was made at the Billancourt Studios in Paris. Location shooting took place around Perpignan in Languedoc-Roussillon. The film's sets were designed by the art director Andrej Andrejew. It was released on VHS in France by TF1 Vidéo on 1 January 1998. It tells the story of a circus owner's daughter, who plays on a rope, sings two songs, and falls in love with a local rugby player.

== Cast ==
- Danielle Darrieux as Lilian Rander
- Lise Delamare as Hélène Carbonnel, the wife of Guy Carbonnel
- Monique Joyce as Lætitia
- Huguette Vivier as Marina
- Gabrielle Fontan as Madame Carbonnel
- Bernard Lancret as René Rivals
- André Alerme as Rander
- Jacques Dumesnil as Guy Carbonnel
- Guillaume de Sax as Esquirol
- Michel Duran as Mazios
- André Gabriello as L'huissier
- Charles Blavette as Casimir
- Maurice Baquet as Firmin
- Marcel Maupi as Bellemain
- Albert Rieux as Rigaux

== Bibliography ==
- Burch, Noël & Sellier, Geneviève. The Battle of the Sexes in French Cinema, 1930–1956. Duke University Press, 2013.
- Leteux, Christine. Continental Films: French Cinema under German Control. University of Wisconsin Press, 2022.
