= Three Sailors in a Convent =

1950 film

- Directed by: Émile Couzinet
- Written by: Émile Couzinet
- Based on: L'habit ne fait pas le moine by Paul Duport and Amable de Saint-Hilaire
- Produced by: Émile Couzinet
- Starring: Frédéric Duvallès; Raphaël Patorni; Jacqueline Dor
- Cinematography: Pierre Dolley
- Edited by: Henriette Wurtzer; André Sarthou
- Music by: Vincent Scotto
- Production company: Burgus Films
- Release date: 13 October 1950
- Running time: 80 minutes
- Country: France
- Language: French

Three Sailors in a Convent (French: Trois marins dans un couvent) is a 1950 French comedy film directed by Émile Couzinet and starring Frédéric Duvallès, Raphaël Patorni and Jacqueline Dor. The film's sets were designed by the art director Serge Renetteau.

== Synopsis ==
A young naval officer and two of his companions go to a convent try to get hold of his fiancée who has been coerced by her father to become a nun. With the help of an understanding priest matters are eventually smoothed over.

== Cast ==
- Frédéric Duvallès as Le curé
- Raphaël Patorni as Le premier moine
- Jacqueline Dor as Marie
- Dorette Ardenne as Ursule
- Marcel Vallée as Pichard
- Michel Barbey as Philippe
- Lily Genny as Louise
- Pierre Brebans as Brissac
- Guy Poni as Piccolo
- Germaine Stainval as Une religieuse
- Madeleine Darnys as La supérieure
- Lise Daubigny
- Georges Dimeray
- Roger Ducamp
- Maurice Lambert
- Nadia Landry
- Jean Mille
- Henri Busquet
- Marcel Roche

== Bibliography ==
- Goble, Alan. The Complete Index to Literary Sources in Film. Walter de Gruyter, 1999.
- Rège, Philippe. Encyclopedia of French Film Directors, Volume 1. Scarecrow Press, 2009.
