= Frédéric Duvallès =

French actor (1884–1971)

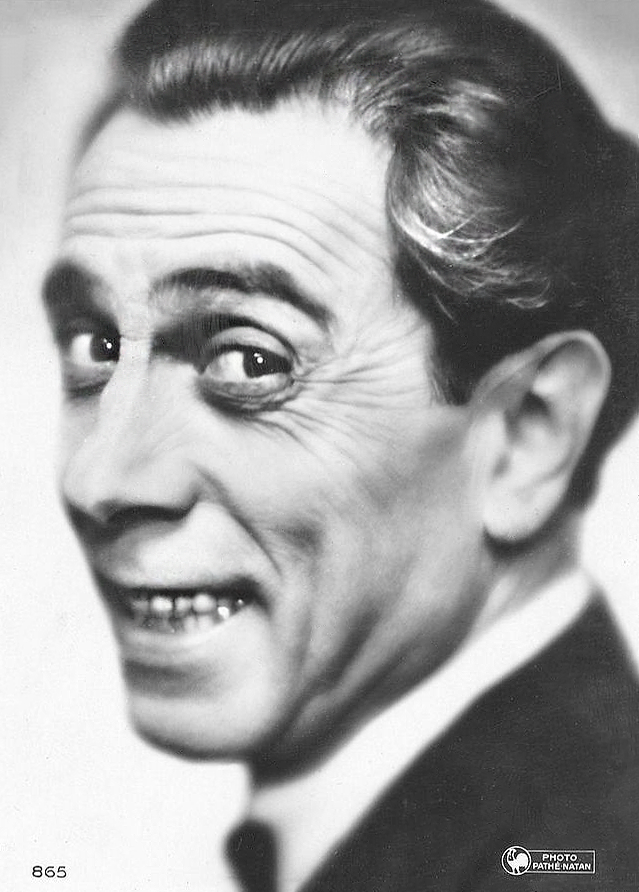
- Duvallès in 1935
- Born: Charles Frédéric Coffinieres; 26 September 1884; Paris, France
- Died: 15 February 1971 (aged 86); Paris, France
- Occupation: Actor
- Years active: 1932–1963

Frédéric Duvallès (26 September 1884 – 15 February 1971) was a French film actor. He was often simply credited as Duvallès.

== Selected filmography ==
- The Wonderful Day (1932)
- Companion Wanted (1932)
- The Heir of the Bal Tabarin (1933)
- Chourinette (1934)
- Dora Nelson (1935)
- The King (1936)
- Excursion Train (1936)
- The Lady from Vittel (1937)
- The Beauty of Montparnasse (1937)
- Tricoche and Cacolet (1938)
- Paid Holidays (1938)
- My Last Mistress (1943)
- Three Sailors in a Convent (1950)
- Sweet Madness (1951)
- The Darling of His Concierge (1951)
- The Passage of Venus (1951)
- That Rascal Anatole (1951)
- The Priest of Saint-Amour (1952)
- In the Land of the Sun (1952)
- His Father's Portrait (1953)
- When Do You Commit Suicide? (1953)
- Elena and Her Men (1956)
- Love in Jamaica (1957)
- Neither Seen Nor Recognized (1958)
- The Burning Court (1962)

== Honors and Awards ==
- Médaille Militaire
- Officer of the Order of Legion of Honour

== Bibliography ==
- Hayward, Susan. French Costume Drama of the 1950s: Fashioning Politics in Film. Intellect Books, 2010.
