= Le Congrès des belles-mères =

1954 film

- Directed by: Émile Couzinet
- Written by: Émile Couzinet
- Produced by: Émile Couzinet
- Starring: Pierre Larquey; Jeanne Fusier-Gir; Georges Rollin
- Cinematography: Pierre Dolley; Scarciafico Hugo
- Edited by: Henriette Wurtzer
- Music by: Paulette Zévaco
- Production company: Burgus Films
- Distributed by: Héraut Film
- Release date: 15 December 1954
- Running time: 90 minutes
- Country: France
- Language: French

Le Congrès des belles-mères (lit. The Congress of Mothers-in-Law) is a 1954 French comedy film directed by Émile Couzinet and starring Pierre Larquey, Jeanne Fusier-Gir and Georges Rollin. It was shot at the Studios de La Côte d'Argent in Bordeaux and on location in Bourg-sur-Gironde. The film's sets were designed by the art director René Renneteau.

== Synopsis ==
A baroness forms a society of mothers-in-law aggrieved at their sons-in-law. She tries to prevent the marriage of her daughter to the mayor's nephew.

== Cast ==
- Pierre Larquey as Le maire
- Jeanne Fusier-Gir as La baronne de Courtebise
- Georges Rollin as Jacques
- Colette Régis as Madame Guerchepinte
- Maximilienne as Madame Moucaille
- Dorette Ardenne as Catherine Moucaille
- Simone Max as Madame Bonnichon
- Alain Baugé as André
- Annick Baugé as Dominique de Courtebise
- Pierre Brebans as René Jolisein
- Raymond Cordy as Le garde champêtre
- Georges Coulonges as Le baron deCourtebise
- Jean-Michel Rankovitch as Jean
- Marcel Roche as Marcel
- Sidoux as Joseph
- Gloria Velasquez as La chanteuse

== Bibliography ==
- Bessy, Maurice & Chirat, Raymond. Histoire du cinéma français: 1951-1955. Pygmalion, 1989.
- Rège, Philippe. Encyclopedia of French Film Directors, Volume 1. Scarecrow Press, 2009.
