= François Chalais =

French film reporter (1919–1996)

François Chalais (French: [ʃalɛ]; December 15, 1919 – May 1, 1996) was a prominent French reporter, journalist, writer and film historian. The François Chalais Prize at the annual Cannes Film Festival is named after him.

== Biography ==
Born in Strasbourg in 1919, Chalais' real name was François-Charles Bauer. His journalism career began under the German occupation of France during World War II, as a writer for several collaborationist publications. Nevertheless, he was awarded the Médaille de la Résistance after the liberation and continued a lengthy and distinguished career, most notably with France Soir from 1976 to 1986 and Le Figaro from 1980 to 1987. Chalais was a regular fixture on French television during the Cannes festival, interviewing celebrities and movie stars, often with his first wife and cohost France Roche.

In 1949 he fought and lost a duel with swords with director Willy Rozier, provoked by comments Chalais had made about actress Marie Dea. In one of his reports for the French television program Panorama, titled "Spécial Vietnam: le nord vu par François Chalais" (Vietnam Special: The North Seen by François Chalais), Chalais interviewed an American pilot who was in a North Vietnamese prison hospital, John McCain. The report offered a rare glimpse of everyday life in North Vietnam during the war and featured an interview with North Vietnamese Prime Minister Pham Van Dong.

Chalais was the author of numerous books, including 18 novels and three memoirs.

Chalais married his second wife, Mei-Chen (née Nguyen Thi Hoa), after his famed 1968 broadcast on North Vietnam. In 1969, he was a member of the jury at the 19th Berlin International Film Festival.

Chalais died of leukemia in Paris in 1996, at 76.

== Selected filmography ==
- Lovers of Toledo (1953)
- Pity for the Vamps (1956)

== See also ==
- Au diable la vertu (1953)
- Candide ou l'Optimisme au XXe siècle (1960)
