= Mireille Hartuch =

French singer, composer and actress

- Born: 30 September 1906; Paris, France
- Died: 29 December 1996 (aged 90); Paris, France
- Resting place: Cimetière du Montparnasse
- Other name: Mireille
- Occupations: Actor composer singer
- Years active: 1928–55
- Spouse: Emmanuel Berl (m. 1937)

Mireille Hartuch (30 September 1906 – 29 December 1996) was a French singer, composer, and actress. She was generally known by the stage name "Mireille," it being a common practice of the time to use a single name for the stage.

== Biography ==
Mireille was born in Paris to Jewish immigrant parents. Her father, Henri (Hendel) Hartuch came from Poland, and her mother, Mathilda Rubinstein, from Britain. Early on, Mireille was taught to play the piano and encouraged to pursue a theatrical and musical career by her mother, herself the child of a musical family. At the age of six she appeared in her first film in a walk-on role, for which she traveled to Britain. As a teenager she worked in theater and began composing music influenced by the great dance halls of Paris. In 1928 she began a collaboration with lyricist Jean Nohain (1900–1981) that led to considerable success for many years.

Fluent in English, she spent two years in the United States, first in New York City where she performed on Broadway, then in Hollywood, where she appeared in films. In 1931, she appeared in L'aviateur with Douglas Fairbanks, Jr. and Buster se marie with Buster Keaton. Meanwhile in France, contemporary stars Maurice Chevalier, Jean Sablon, and Charles Trenet (who credited Mireille with introducing "swing" to France), charted hits with her compositions, launching her songwriting career.

In 1933, she appeared in the French film Chourinette, though until 1951, when she appeared in Au fil des ondes, her career as a music-hall singer took precedence. In 1937, she married the writer and philosopher Emmanuel Berl. Three years later, the Nazi occupation forced the Jewish couple into hiding in Argentat in the remote Corrèze département of the Limousin region. There, Mireille was very active in the French Resistance and was head of the local liberation committee.

After the War, she befriended Jean Cocteau, Albert Camus, and André Malraux. In the 1950s, her friend, Sacha Guitry gave her the idea of opening the "Petit Conservatoire de la chanson" (Little Conservatory of Song ) to use her talents to train young variety singers. The Petit Conservatoire produced a Sunday radio program beginning in 1955, and a television program from 1960 to 1974, nurturing the voices of a number of young singers who went on to lead successful careers, such as Françoise Hardy, Alain Souchon, Alice Dona, Hervé Cristiani, Yves Duteil, Frida Boccara and Colette Magny.

In her long and celebrated career, Mireille Hartuch composed more than six hundred songs and was twice decorated by the government for her contributions to French culture. She continued performing well into her old age. She lived at 36 rue de Montpensier in the 1st arrondissement of Paris for forty years.

Mireille Hartuch died in Paris in 1996 at the age of 90 and was interred there in the Cimetière du Montparnasse.
