= Georgette Tissier =

French actress

- Born: 26 June 1910; Boulogne-Billancourt, Hauts-de-Seine, France
- Died: 30 March 1959 (aged 48); Paris, France
- Other name: Louise Georgette Lalire
- Occupation: Actress
- Years active: 1935-1954 (film)

Georgette Tissier (1910–1959) was a French actress. She was the wife of the actor Jean Tissier.

== Selected filmography ==
- Metropolitan (1939)
- The Lover of Borneo (1942)
- The Black Cavalier (1945)
- The Eleventh Hour Guest (1945)
- Christine Gets Married (1946)
- Messieurs Ludovic (1946)
- The Bread Peddler (1950)
- That Rascal Anatole (1951)

== Bibliography ==
- Yves Desrichard. Henri Decoin. Durante, 2003.
