= Les aventures des pieds nickeles =

- Theatrical release poster
- Directed by: Marcel Aboulker
- Based on: Les Pieds Nickelés
- Starring: Rellys
- Edited by: Jean Lehérissey
- Release date: 1948
- Running time: 85 mins
- Country: France
- Language: French

Les aventures des Pieds-Nickelés is a 1948 French film directed by Marcel Aboulker.

== Plot ==
Sherlock Coco, famous detective, tries to thwart the machiavellian plans of the trio of shock. Croquignol, Ribouldingue and Filochard must be extra vigilant, but the profit motive is too strong. As a corollary, the famous pink diamond is also of interest to their legendary enemy, Jo Papillon. But always inventive, they will work out multiple scams and tricks to reach their goals.

== Cast ==
- Rellys: Croquignol
- Robert Dhéry: Filochard
- Maurice Baquet: Ribouldingue
- Fred Pasquali: Sherlock Coco
- Luc Andrieux: Hector
- Colette Brosset: Irène
- Claire Gérard: the princess
- Fernand Gilbert: Bébert
- Lucien Hector: the brigadier
- André Numès Fils: a guard
- Christian Duvaleix: a gangster
- Roger Saget: a gangster
- Gérard Séty: a gangster
- Jean Le Poulain: a gangster

== Reception ==
The film was popular at the French box office.
