= Picpus (film) =

1943 film

- Belgian poster
- Directed by: Richard Pottier
- Written by: Jean-Paul Le Chanois
- Based on: Signé Picpus by Georges Simenon
- Produced by: Alfred Greven
- Starring: Albert Préjean; Juliette Faber; Jean Tissier
- Cinematography: Charles Bauer
- Edited by: Gérard Bensdorp
- Music by: Jacques Météhen
- Production company: Continental Films
- Distributed by: Films Sonores Tobis
- Release date: 23 February 1943
- Running time: 95 minutes
- Country: France
- Language: French

Picpus is a 1943 French film noir mystery crime film directed by Richard Pottier and starring Albert Préjean, Juliette Faber and Jean Tissier. It was produced by the German-controlled Continental Films during the occupation of France. It was shot at the Billancourt Studios in Paris. The film's sets were designed by the art director Andrej Andrejew.

== Cast ==
- Albert Préjean as L'inspecteur Maigret
- Juliette Faber as Berthe
- Jean Tissier as Mascouvin
- André Gabriello as Lucas
- Noël Roquevert as Louis Dubief
- Guillaume de Sax as Maître Laignan
- Édouard Delmont as Le Cloaguen
- Antoine Balpêtré as Le grand patron
- Henri Vilbert as Amadieu
- Pierre Palau as Le docteur Pierre
- Gabrielle Fontan as La soeur de Le Cloaguen
- Colette Régis as Madame Le Cloaguen
- Maximilienne as Madame Bertaud
- Huguette Vivier as Eliane
- Héléna Manson as Marie, la bonne

== Bibliography ==
- Bessy, Maurice & Chirat, Raymond. Histoire du cinéma français: encyclopédie des films, 1940–1950. Pygmalion, 1986.
- Leteux, Christine. Continental Films: French Cinema under German Control. University of Wisconsin Press, 2022.
- Rège, Philippe. Encyclopedia of French Film Directors, Volume 1. Scarecrow Press, 2009.
- Spicer, Andrew. Historical Dictionary of Film Noir. Scarecrow Press, 2010.
