= Jacqueline Dor =

French actress

- Born: 19 July 1929; Boulogne-sur-Mer, Pas-de-Calais, France
- Died: 20 December 1972 (aged 43); Paris, France
- Occupation: Actress
- Years active: 1947-1952 (film)

Jacqueline Dor (1929–1972) was a French film actress.

== Selected filmography ==
- Monsieur de Falindor (1947)
- Scandals of Clochemerle (1948)
- Three Boys, One Girl (1948)
- Cage of Girls (1949)
- Emile the African (1949)
- Rome Express (1950)
- Three Sailors in a Convent (1950)

== Bibliography ==
- Goble, Alan. The Complete Index to Literary Sources in Film. Walter de Gruyter, 1999.
