= Lovers of Paris =

1957 film

- Mexican poster for the film
- Directed by: Julien Duvivier
- Screenplay by: Julien Duvivier; Léo Joannon; Henri Jeanson
- Based on: Pot-Bouille by Émile Zola
- Produced by: Raymond Hakim; Robert Hakim
- Starring: Gérard Philipe; Danielle Darrieux; Dany Carrel
- Cinematography: Michel Kelber
- Edited by: Madeleine Gug
- Music by: Jean Wiener
- Production companies: Paris Film Productions; Panitalia
- Distributed by: Compagnie Commerciale Française Cinématographique
- Release date: 18 October 1957
- Running time: 115 minutes
- Country: France
- Language: French
- Box office: 2,679,987 admissions (France)

Lovers of Paris (original title Pot-Bouille, "Stew Pot") is a 1957 French film directed by Julien Duvivier and starring Gérard Philipe. It is based on the 1882 novel Pot-Bouille by Émile Zola.

The movie is in black and white, and filmed in 35 mm. It was shot at the Billancourt Studios in Paris and on location in the city. The sets were designed by the art director Léon Barsacq. It premiered in France on October 18, 1957.

It was the second film Duvivier directed based on a novel in Zola's Rougon-Macquart series, the first being Au Bonheur des Dames in 1930.

== Plot ==
A young provincial, Octave Mouret, arrives in Paris during the Second Empire. Madame Josserand, a society woman who thinks of little other than marrying off her daughter Berthe, sets her sights on him. But Octave has already turned his attention to the married Madame Hédouin, who runs a large department store, "Au Bonheur des Dames", where he is hired as a salesman. She is beautiful, but remains distant despite Octave's efforts to be noticed. Upset, Madame Josserand forces Berthe, against her will, to marry Auguste Vabre, a shopkeeper with little money. Berthe soon becomes Octave's mistress, and Octave applies his commercial talents to straightening out Auguste's finances. Madame Hédouin, now widowed, then realizes the business and romantic possibilities with her handsome young salesman.

== Cast ==
- Gérard Philipe as Octave Mouret
- Danielle Darrieux as Caroline Hédouin
- Dany Carrel as Berthe Josserand
- Jacques Duby as Auguste Vabre
- Jane Marken as Eléonore Josserand
- Olivier Hussenot as Joseph Josserand
- Anouk Aimée as Marie Pichon
- Danielle Dumont as Hortense Josserand
- Henri Vilbert as Narcisse Bachelard
- Claude Nollier as Clotilde Duveyrier
- Micheline Luccioni as Valérie Vabre
- Judith Magre as Rachel
- Michèle Grellier as Fanny
- Germaine de France as Mlle Menu
- Gabrielle Fontan as Mme Pilou
- Alexandre Rignault as Gourd
- Van Doude as Hector Trublot
- Catherine Samie as Clémence
- Jean-Louis Le Goff as The sommelier
- Henri Coutet as A laborer in the yard
- Albert Médina as The conductor
- Pascale de Boysson as Gasparine
- Jean Brochard as Monsieur Duveyrier
- Arielle Coignet as Louise
- Georges Cusin as Achille Compardon
- Liliane Ernout as The client at "Rendu"
- Jacques Eyser as A doctor
- Jacques Grello as Théophile Vabre
- Gaston Jacquet as Hippolyte Vabre
- Jenny Orléans as Rose Compardon
- Rivers Cadet as The notary
- Monique Vita as Clarisse Boquet
- Denise Gence as Lisa
- Valérie Vivin as Adèle
- Paul Faivre as Stagecoach driver
- Charles Lemontier as Man passing in the street
- Jean Degrave as A guest
- René Worms as A guest
- Andrès as A guest
- Marius Gaidon as A server
- Roger Lecuyer as A wedding guest
- Lydia Ewande as Clarisse's maid
- Paule Launay
- Betty Beckers as Valérie's maid

== Crew ==
- Director: Julien Duvivier
- Screenplay: Julien Duvivier, Léo Joannon, Henri Jeanson
- Assistant directors: Michel Romanoff, Pierre Maho
- Cinematography: Michel Kelber, assisted by André Domage
- Sound: Jacques Carrère, assisted by Guy Chichignoud
- Set design: Léon Barsacq
- Editing: Madeleine Gug
- Music: Jean Wiener, orchestra under the direction of André Girard, featuring Ray Ventura
- Costumes: Marcel Escoffier, Jean Zay, Emmanuel Bourrassin
- Makeup: Jean-Ulysse Piedeloup and Igor Keldich
- Hairstyling: Jean Lalaurette
- Theatrical director: Tonio Sune
- Production: Paris Films Production (Paris), Panitalia (Rome)
- Heads of production: Robert and Raymond Hakim
- Director of production: Ludmilia Goulian
- Production assistant: Pierre Duvivier
- Distributor: C.C.F.C
- Set designer: Maurice Barnathan
