= Le commissaire est bon enfant =

Le Commissaire est bon enfant (The Chief is a nice Fellow) is a one-act comedy by Georges Courteline. It was first performed on December 16, 1899 at the Théâtre du Gymnase Marie Bell in Paris.

== Roles ==
- The Chief
- Floche
- Breloc
- A man
- Agent Lagrenaille
- Agent Garrigou
- Mr. Punèz
- Mrs. Floche

== Published editions ==
- Courteline, Georges (1965). Pruner, Francis (ed.). Théâtre [Theatre]. GF - Garnier-Flammarion, 65. Paris: Garnier-Flammarion. ISBN 9782080700650. OCLC 634935622. Also OCLC 406497626.

== Filmed adaptations ==
- 1935: Le commissaire est bon enfant, le gendarme est sans pitié, film by Jacques Becker and Pierre Prévert
- 1974: Le commissaire est bon enfant, television film by Jean Bertho
