= La Boîte à sel =

French satirical television show

- Genre: Satirical
- Country of origin: France
- Original language: French

Production
- Camera setup: Multi-camera
- Running time: 22–24 minutes

Original release
- Network: RTF
- Release: 16 October 1955 – 5 November 1960

La Boîte à sel (English: The Salt Box) is a French satirical comedy and current affairs television program created and presented by Jacques Grello, Robert Rocca and Pierre Tchernia that aired on RTF (French Radio and Television Broadcasting) from October 16, 1955, to November 5, 1960.

Several famous French actors and comics participated on the show such as Michel Roux. Paul Préboist or the actress Dora Doll.

== History ==
La Boîte à sel was the first satirical television show in France. The show caused controversy as the producers refused to censor jokes about the Algerian War thus ending the program.
