= The Black Cavalier =

1945 film

- Directed by: Gilles Grangier
- Written by: André-Paul Antoine
- Produced by: Paul-Edmond Decharme; Lucien Masson
- Starring: Georges Guétary; Mila Parély; Jean Tissier
- Cinematography: Marc Fossard
- Edited by: Germaine Artus
- Music by: Francis Lopez
- Production company: La Société des Films Sirius
- Distributed by: La Société des Films Sirius
- Release date: 31 March 1945
- Running time: 81 minutes
- Country: France
- Language: French

The Black Cavalier (French: Le cavalier noir) is a 1945 French historical adventure film directed by Gilles Grangier and starring Georges Guétary, Mila Parély and Jean Tissier. It also marked the screen debut of Nicole Maurey who appeared in a supporting role.

The film's sets were designed by the art director Roland Quignon. Location shooting took place at the Château de Vaudrémont in Vaudrémont (Haute-Marne). It was one of the most popular movies in France in 1945 with admissions of 3,672,572.

== Synopsis ==
In French Flanders in the early eighteenth century, a nobleman who has been dispossessed of his property becomes a notorious outlaw. He targets the salt tax collector Monsieur de Saint-Brissac, but is lured by his attractive daughter into a trap.

== Cast ==
- Georges Guétary as le seigneur Ramon de Ortila
- Mila Parély as Lola
- Jean Tissier as Le Hardi
- André Alerme as Monsieur de Saint-Brissac
- Nicole Maurey as Solange de Saint-Brissac
- Simone Valère as Lison
- Michèle Philippe as Marion
- Georgette Tissier as Annette
- Aimé Simon-Girard as Simon
- Thomy Bourdelle as Pierre le Mauvais
- Paul Demange as Plume
- Albert Rémy as Pinte
- René Fluet as Pot
- Paul Faivre as Le meunier

== Bibliography ==
- Powrie, Phil & Cadalanu, Marie . The French Film Musical. Bloomsbury Publishing, 2020.
