= Three Days of Fun in Paris =

1954 film

- Directed by: Émile Couzinet
- Written by: Émile Couzinet
- Based on: La Cognette by Eugène Labiche
- Produced by: Émile Couzinet
- Starring: Lucien Baroux; Armand Bernard; Pierre Larquey
- Cinematography: Scarciafico Hugo
- Edited by: Henriette Wurtzer
- Music by: Paulette Zévaco
- Production company: Burgus Films
- Distributed by: Héraut Film
- Release date: 14 May 1954
- Running time: 84 minutes
- Country: France
- Language: French

Three Days of Fun in Paris (French: Trois jours de bringue à Paris) is a 1954 French comedy film directed by Émile Couzinet and starring Lucien Baroux, Armand Bernard and Pierre Larquey. It was based on a play by Eugène Labiche. It was shot at the Bordeaux Studios and on location around Paris. The film's sets were designed by the art director René Renneteau.

== Synopsis ==
A group of men from the provinces save up their money and head to Paris for three days. Soon they run into trouble with the police and have a series of adventures which convinces them of the superiority and security of their own small town.

== Cast ==
- Lucien Baroux as Théophile Chambourcy, capitaine des pompiers
- Armand Bernard as L'agent matrimonial Cocarel
- Pierre Larquey as Le cultivateur Colladan
- Robert Arnoux as Le commissaire
- Georges Bever as Le percepeteur Baucantin
- Raymond Cordy as Le garçon de restaurant
- Félix Oudart as Le pharmacien Cordembois
- Catherine Cheiney as Blanche
- Jean-Michel Rankovitch as Sylvain
- Marcel Roche as Le notaire Félix Renaudier
- Gloria Velasquez as La chanteuse
- Jean-Louis Bacqué as Le brigadier
- Milly Mathis as Léonida Chambourcy

== Bibliography ==
- Goble, Alan. The Complete Index to Literary Sources in Film. Walter de Gruyter, 1999.
- Rège, Philippe. Encyclopedia of French Film Directors, Volume 1. Scarecrow Press, 2009.
