= When Do You Commit Suicide? (1953 film) =

- Directed by: Émile Couzinet
- Written by: André Dahl (novel); Émile Couzinet
- Produced by: Émile Couzinet
- Starring: Jean Tissier; Frédéric Duvallès; Daniel Sorano
- Cinematography: Pierre Dolley
- Edited by: Henriette Wurtzer
- Music by: Vincent Scotto
- Production company: Burgus Films
- Release date: 10 July 1953
- Running time: 85 minutes
- Country: France
- Language: French

When Do You Commit Suicide? (French: Quand te tues-tu?) is a 1953 French comedy film directed by Émile Couzinet and starring Jean Tissier, Frédéric Duvallès and Daniel Sorano. It is a remake of the 1931 film of the same title.

== Cast ==
- Jean Tissier as Vicomte Xavier du Venoux
- Frédéric Duvallès as Gripasou
- Daniel Sorano as Midol
- Jeanne Fusier-Gir as Virginie
- Arlette Sauvage as Gaby
- René Génin as Le maire
- Gaby Bruyère
- Léonce Corne as Le notaire
- Carmen Amaya as Herself
- Georges Coulonges
- Maurice Lambert
- Marcel Roche as Duradin
- Marcel Vallée as Petavey

== Bibliography ==
- Goble, Alan. The Complete Index to Literary Sources in Film. Walter de Gruyter, 1999.
