= Women Are Angels =

1952 film

- Directed by: Marcel Aboulker
- Written by: Pierre-Aristide Bréal (play); Marcel Aboulker
- Produced by: Paul Claudon; Marius Franay
- Starring: Viviane Romance; Jeanne Fusier-Gir; André Gabriello
- Cinematography: Marcel Grignon
- Edited by: Maurice Serein
- Music by: Richard Cornu
- Production company: Société Générale de Gestion Cinématographique
- Distributed by: La Société des Films Sirius
- Release date: 3 September 1952
- Running time: 95 minutes
- Country: France
- Language: French

Women Are Angels (French: Les femmes sont des anges) is a 1952 French comedy film directed by Marcel Aboulker and starring Viviane Romance, Jeanne Fusier-Gir and André Gabriello. The film's sets were designed by the art director Georges Petitot.

== Cast ==
- Viviane Romance as Edmée Clotier
- Jeanne Fusier-Gir as Léontine
- André Gabriello as Le brigadier
- Jacques Grello as Léon Clotier
- Jacques Fabbri as Théodore
- Charles Vissières as Pelure
- Robert Vattier as Le docteur
- Jean Parédès as Philogène
- Julien Maffre as Le facteur
- Pierre Moncorbier as Le notaire

== Bibliography ==
- Rège, Philippe. Encyclopedia of French Film Directors, Volume 1. Scarecrow Press, 2009.
