= That Rascal Anatole =

1951 film

- Directed by: Émile Couzinet
- Written by: Émile Couzinet
- Based on: La Grande Vie by Yves Mirande
- Produced by: Émile Couzinet
- Starring: Frédéric Duvallès; Armand Bernard; Daniel Sorano
- Cinematography: Pierre Dolley
- Edited by: Henriette Wurtzer
- Music by: Vincent Scotto
- Production company: Burgus Films
- Distributed by: Societe d'Edition et de Location de Films
- Release date: 26 December 1951
- Running time: 87 minutes
- Country: France
- Language: French

That Rascal Anatole (French: Ce coquin d'Anatole) is a 1951 French comedy film directed by Émile Couzinet and starring Frédéric Duvallès, Armand Bernard and Daniel Sorano. It was shot at the Bordeaux Studios. The film's sets were designed by the art director René Renneteau.

== Cast ==
- Frédéric Duvallès as Me Bonneteau
- Armand Bernard as Me Tedet
- Irène de Trébert as Hélène de Bellefeuille
- Daniel Sorano as Anatole
- Jean Tissier as Lucien
- Jacques Torrens as Paul Paufilat
- Claire Maurier as Germaine de la Boëtie
- Anny Flore as La chanteuse
- Georgette Tissier as Une vendeuse
- Maurice Laban as Le beau-frère
- Milly Mathis as Mme Paufilat

== Bibliography ==
- Bessy, Maurice & Chirat, Raymond. Histoire du cinéma français: 1951-1955. Pygmalion, 1989.
- Goble, Alan. The Complete Index to Literary Sources in Film. Walter de Gruyter, 1999.
- Rège, Philippe. Encyclopedia of French Film Directors, Volume 1. Scarecrow Press, 2009.
