= Vendetta in Camargue =

1950 film

- Directed by: Jean Devaivre
- Written by: René Méjean; Jean-Devaivre
- Produced by: Jean-Devaivre
- Starring: Jean Pâqui; Jean Tissier; Brigitte Auber
- Cinematography: Lucien Joulin
- Edited by: Louis Devaivre
- Music by: Joseph Kosma
- Production company: Les Films Neptune
- Distributed by: Sirius Films
- Release date: 23 August 1950
- Running time: 88 minutes
- Country: France
- Language: French

Vendetta in Camargue (French: Vendetta en Camargue) is a 1950 French comedy drama film directed by Jean Devaivre and starring Jean Pâqui, Jean Tissier and Brigitte Auber.

The film's sets were designed by the art director Robert Hubert. It was shot on location in Saint-Gilles-du-Gard.

== Synopsis ==
A young woman inheritants a bull-breeding farm in the Camargue region of Southern France but faces problems both from her resentful male workforce and by a series of thefts of cattle and horses from the estate.

== Cast ==
- Jean Pâqui as Frédé
- Jean Tissier as Hurchart
- Brigitte Auber as Huguette
- Thomy Bourdelle as Krebs
- Jacques Dufilho as Zacramir
- Rosy Varte as Conchita
- Daniel Sorano as Daniel Tiersot
- Mady Berry as Mme Hurchart

== Bibliography ==
- Bessy, Maurice & Chirat, Raymond. Histoire du cinéma français: encyclopédie des films, 1940–1950. Pygmalion, 1986
