= The Lover of Borneo =

1942 film

- Directed by: Jean-Pierre Feydeau; René Le Hénaff
- Written by: Roger Ferdinand
- Based on: The Lover of Borneo by Roger Ferdinand and José Germain
- Produced by: Mario Bruitte; Albert Dodrumez; Édouard Harispuru
- Starring: Arletty; Jean Tissier; André Alerme
- Cinematography: Victor Arménise
- Edited by: René Le Hénaff
- Music by: René Sylviano
- Production company: Compagnie Commerciale Française Cinématographique
- Distributed by: Compagnie Commerciale Française Cinématographique
- Release date: 28 May 1942
- Running time: 90 minutes
- Country: France
- Language: French

The Lover of Borneo (French: L'amant de Bornéo) is a 1942 French comedy film directed by Jean-Pierre Feydeau and René Le Hénaff and starring Arletty, Jean Tissier and André Alerme. The film was based on a 1941 stage play of the same title by Roger Ferdinand and José Germain. It was shot at the Cité Elgé Studios in Paris. The film's sets were designed by the art director Jacques Colombier.

== Synopsis ==
Lucien Mazerand, a bookseller from the provinces, arrives in Paris to spend a few days. On his visit he becomes enthralled by the music hall singer Stella Losange, and to impress he pretends to be an adventurer who has spent years in the Tropics. Although he has a rival in chocolatier Arthur Serval, Stella is soon planning to leave with Lucien for Borneo.

== Cast ==
- Arletty as Stella Losange
- Jean Tissier as Lucien Mazerand
- André Alerme as Arthur Serval
- Pauline Carton as Agathe
- Pierre Larquey as Lajoie
- Guillaume de Sax as Gaston
- Georgette Tissier as Une 'girl'
- Jimmy Gaillard as Rastange
- Marguerite de Morlaye as La vieille spectatrice
- Germaine Reuver as Madame Charles

== Bibliography ==
- Bessy, Maurice & Chirat, Raymond. Histoire du cinéma français: encyclopédie des films, 1940–1950. Pygmalion, 1986
- Burch, Noël & Sellier, Geneviève. The Battle of the Sexes in French Cinema, 1930–1956. Duke University Press, 2013.
- Rège, Philippe. Encyclopedia of French Film Directors, Volume 1. Scarecrow Press, 2009.
