= The Secret of Helene Marimon =

1954 film

- Directed by: Henri Calef
- Written by: Henri Calef; J. B. Cherrier (novel) Jacques Willemetz; Gérard Willemetz; Henri Castillou
- Produced by: René Pignières; Jacques Willemetz
- Starring: Isa Miranda; Franck Villard; Carla Del Poggio
- Cinematography: Roger Dormoy
- Edited by: Jean-Louis Levi-Alvarès
- Music by: Georges Van Parys
- Production companies: Romana Film; SNC
- Distributed by: Corona
- Release date: 14 May 1954 (France)
- Running time: 100 minutes
- Countries: France; Italy
- Language: French

The Secret of Helene Marimon (French: Le Secret d'Hélène Marimon) is a 1954 French-Italian drama film directed by Henri Calef and starring Isa Miranda, Franck Villard and Carla Del Poggio. The scenario was based on the novel of J. B. Cherrier "Les cahiers du conseiller Marimon".

The film's sets were designed by the art director Lucien Aguettand.

== Cast ==
- Isa Miranda as Hélène Marimon
- Franck Villard as Jacques Taillandier
- Carla Del Poggio as Dominique Marimon
- Jean Debucourt as Camille Marimon
- Noël Roquevert as uncle of Jacques
- André Valmy as Thierry
- Michel Roux as Leflou
- André Versini as Mr Delabarre
- Hella Lexington as Betty
- Hubert Noël as a soldier
- Albert Michel as a convalescent soldier
- Jacques Dynam as Galdou
- Lucienne Granier as Mrs Delabarre
- Jeanne Provost as Mrs Ravan
- Robert Seller as Colonel Brognot
- Robert Allan
- Louis de Funès as Mr. Rachoux, the gardener
- Maurice Biraud
- R.J. Chauffard
- Monique Defrançois
- Gabriel Gobin

== Bibliography ==
- Orio Caldiron & Matilde Hochkofler. Isa Miranda. Gremese Editore.
