= Alarm in Morocco =

1953 film

- Directed by: Jean-Devaivre
- Written by: André-Paul Antoine; Jean-Devaivre; Jean-Paul Le Chanois
- Produced by: Jean-Devaivre; Lucien Masson
- Starring: Jean-Claude Pascal; Gianna Maria Canale; Erich von Stroheim
- Cinematography: Lucien Joulin
- Edited by: Louis Devaivre; Raymond Lamy
- Music by: Joseph Kosma
- Production companies: La Société des Films Sirius; Fono Roma
- Distributed by: La Société des Films Sirius
- Release date: 15 November 1953
- Running time: 110 minutes
- Countries: France; Italy
- Language: French

Alarm in Morocco (French: Alerte au sud, Italian: Allarme a sud) is a 1953 French-Italian adventure film directed by Jean-Devaivre and starring Jean-Claude Pascal, Gianna Maria Canale and Erich von Stroheim. Partly shot on location in Morocco, it was made using the Gevacolor process.

== Plot ==
In the south of French Morocco, two members of the Foreign Legion uncover what they believe to be the testing of a secret weapon.

== Cast ==
- Jean-Claude Pascal as Jean Pasqier
- Gianna Maria Canale as Nathalie Provence
- Erich von Stroheim as Conrad Nagel
- Jean Tissier as Guillaume Provence
- Albert Dinan as Roland
- Peter van Eyck as Howard
- Daniel Sorano as Serge Depoigny
- Lia Amanda as Michèle
- Jean Murat as Le Colonel
- Daniel Lecourtois as Le commandant
- Simone Bach as Solange
- Richard Francoeur as Le commissaire
- Thomy Bourdelle as Berthier
- Antoine Balpêtré as Le juge
- Marcel Pérès as Le général
- Paulette Andrieux as La petite rousse
- Dario Michaelis as Le balafré
- Gérard Buhr as Bernis
- Marcel Portier
- François Joux

== Bibliography ==
- Arthur Lennig. Stroheim. University Press of Kentucky, 2004.
