= Farandole (film) =

1945 film

- Directed by: André Zwoboda
- Written by: André Cayatte; Henri Jeanson
- Produced by: Fernand Weill
- Starring: André Luguet; Lise Delamare; Gaby Morlay
- Cinematography: Armand Thirard
- Edited by: Louisette Hautecoeur
- Music by: Georges Auric
- Production company: Compagnons du Film
- Distributed by: Compagnie Commerciale Française Cinématographique
- Release date: 10 February 1945
- Running time: 102 minutes
- Country: France
- Language: French

Farandole is a 1945 French comedy film directed by André Zwoboda and starring André Luguet, Lise Delamare, Gaby Morlay. It takes its title from the Farandole, a traditional dance from Provence whose structure the plot follows. It was shot at the Saint-Maurice Studios in Paris. The film's sets were designed by the art director Robert Hubert. It was filmed following the Liberation but released while the Second World War was still being fought.

== Synopsis ==
The film is structurally similar to Arthur Schnitzler's La Ronde with a series of stories all linked together.

== Cast ==
- André Luguet as Maxime Théric
- Lise Delamare as Blanche
- Gaby Morlay as Elizabeth
- Paulette Dubost as Raymonde "Milienne", la prostituée
- Louis Salou as Auguste Moine
- André Alerme as Pascal Bondieu, l'escroc
- Jany Holt as Marianne, la dactylo qui tue la femme de son amant
- Bernard Blier as Sylvestre Clarel, l'amant
- Maurice Escande as Me Monestier, l'avocat accusateur
- Jean Davy as l'avocat de Marianne
- Gustave Gallet as le président du tribunal
- Guillaume de Sax as Brincard, le banquier véreux
- Guy Decomble as Paul Blanc, le journaliste
- Pierre Labry as l'inspecteur Mazeau
- Alfred Adam as "Zanzi" l'ami de Milienne

== Bibliography ==
- Oscherwitz, Dayna & Higgins, MaryEllen. The A to Z of French Cinema. Scarecrow Press, 2009.
