= The Priest of Saint-Amour =

1952 film

- Directed by: Émile Couzinet
- Written by: Émile Couzinet
- Based on: The Priest of Saint-Amour by Jean Guitton
- Produced by: Émile Couzinet
- Starring: Frédéric Duvallès; Pierre Larquey; Jeanne Fusier-Gir
- Cinematography: Pierre Dolley
- Edited by: Henriette Wurtzer
- Music by: Vincent Scotto
- Production company: Burgus Films
- Distributed by: Héraut Film
- Release date: 14 November 1952
- Running time: 88 minutes
- Country: France
- Language: French

The Priest of Saint-Amour (French: Le curé de Saint-Amour) is a 1952 French comedy film directed by Émile Couzinet and starring Frédéric Duvallès, Pierre Larquey and Jeanne Fusier-Gir. The film's sets were designed by the art director René Renneteau.

== Synopsis ==
A Marquise wishes to marry off her niece to a baron, she is love with a commoner and runs away with him. In Saint-Amour a kindly priest is able to resolve the matter to everyone's happiness.

== Cast ==
- Frédéric Duvallès as Le curé
- Pierre Larquey as Célestin
- Jeanne Fusier-Gir as Marquise de Saint-Ange
- Jacques Torrens as Jacques
- Yorick Royan as Nicole
- Marcel Vallée as Le policier
- Maryse Martin
- Roger Duncan
- Georges Coulonges
- Marcel Roche
- Jean Mille
- Maurice Lambert
- Mme Pujol-Amar
- Madeleine Darnys
- Nadia Landry
- Gilberte Sterlin
- Pierre Magnier

== Bibliography ==
- Bessy, Maurice & Chirat, Raymond. Histoire du cinéma français: 1951-1955. Pygmalion, 1989.
- Rège, Philippe. Encyclopedia of French Film Directors, Volume 1. Scarecrow Press, 2009.
