= Daniel Sorano =

French actor

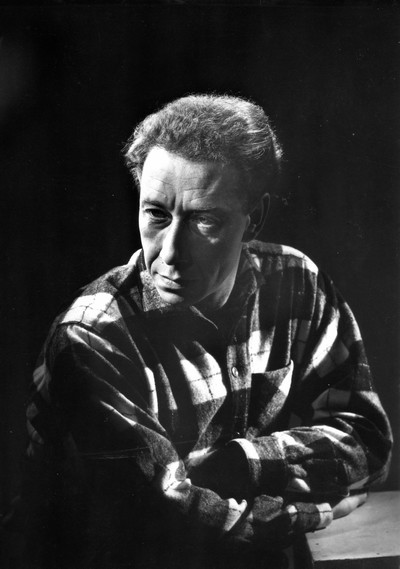
- Born: 14 December 1920; Toulouse, France
- Died: 18 May 1962 (aged 41); Amsterdam, Netherlands
- Occupation: Actor
- Years active: 1950–1962 (film)

Daniel Sorano (1920–1962) was a French stage and film actor.

== Filmography ==
Year	Title	Role	Notes
1950	Vendetta in Camargue	Daniel Tiersot	
1951	That Rascal Anatole	Anatole	
1952	Trois vieilles filles en folie	Dudule	
1952	Buridan, héros de la tour de Nesle	Lancelot de la Bigorne	
1953	When Do You Commit Suicide?	Midol	
1953	Alarm in Morocco	Serge Depoigny	
1954	After You Duchess		
1954	Après vous, duchesse		
1955	The Grand Maneuver	Le maître d'armes	
1957	Les Truands	Le barman	
1958	The Daughter of Hamburg	Jean-Marie	
1959	Le Vent se lève	Mathias	
1960	Marche ou crève	Milan	
1960	Les magiciennes	Wladimir	
1961	Arrêtez les tambours	Resistance leader	
1961	The Three Musketeers	Richelieu	
1962	Le scorpion	Peter Carl	

== Bibliography ==
- Goble, Alan. The Complete Index to Literary Sources in Film. Walter de Gruyter, 1999.
