= The Cucuroux Family =

1953 film by Émile Couzinet

- Directed by: Émile Couzinet
- Written by: Yves Mirande (play); Émile Couzinet
- Produced by: Émile Couzinet
- Starring: Georges Rollin; Nathalie Nattier; Jean Tissier
- Cinematography: Scarciafico Hugo
- Edited by: Henriette Wurtzer
- Music by: Paulette Zévaco
- Production company: Burgus Films
- Distributed by: Héraut Film
- Release date: 25 December 1953
- Running time: 82 minutes
- Country: France
- Language: French

The Cucuroux Family (French: La famille Cucuroux) is a 1953 French comedy film directed by Émile Couzinet and starring Georges Rollin, Nathalie Nattier and Jean Tissier. An upper-class Frenchman's plans to marry a wealthy woman are threatened by the presence of his mistress.

== Cast ==
- Georges Rollin as Gontran de Saint-Paul
- Nathalie Nattier as Nita
- Jean Tissier as Marquis Aristide Cucuroux
- Pierre Larquey as Jean
- Jeanne Fusier-Gir as Célestine
- André Salvador as Coquelicot
- Catherine Cheiney as Henriette
- Yorick Royan as Geneviève de Coutville

== Bibliography ==
- Rège, Philippe. Encyclopedia of French Film Directors, Volume 1. Scarecrow Press, 2009.
