= Jean Parédès =

French actor

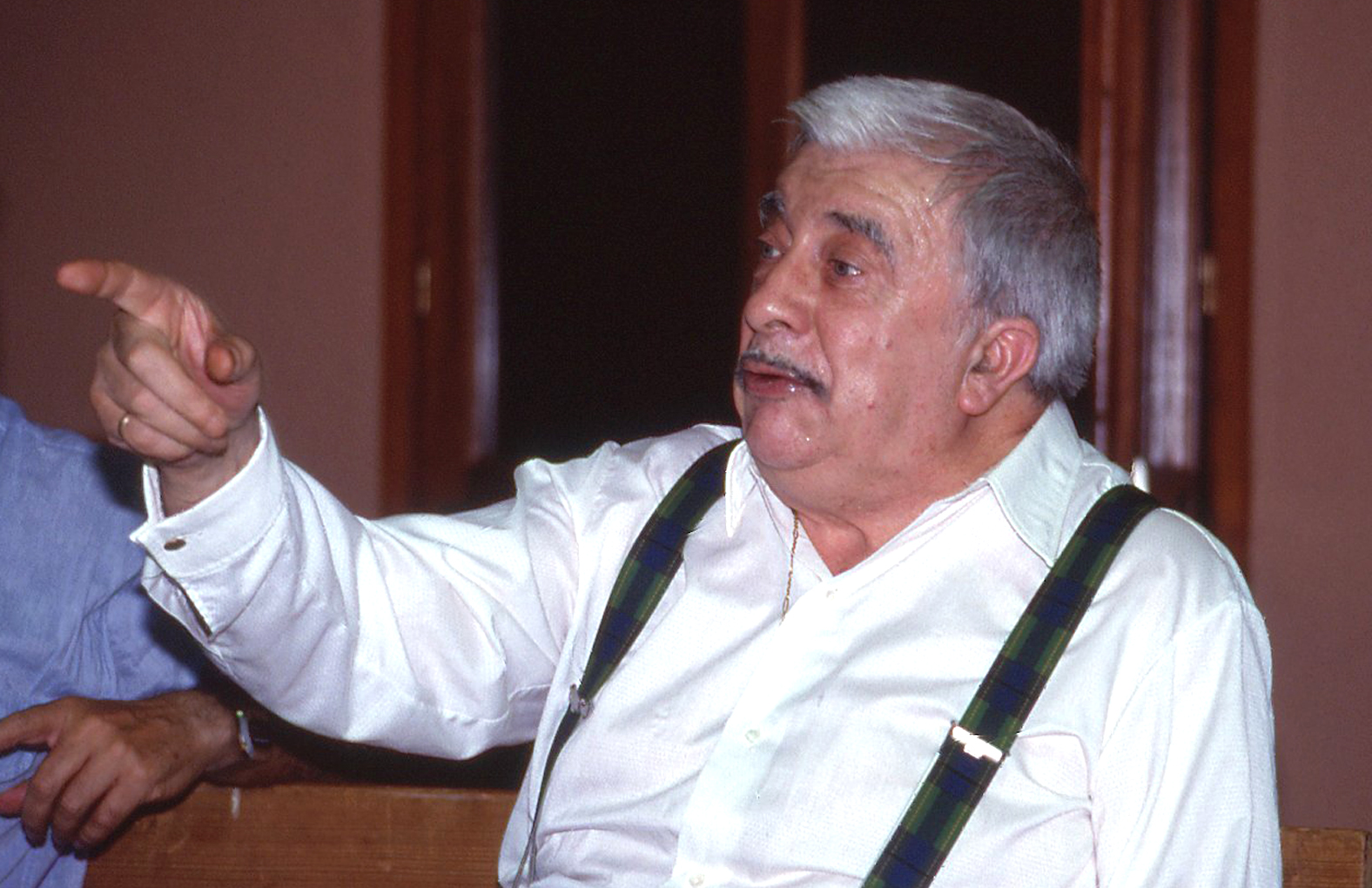
- Jean Parédès
- Born: 17 October 1914; Pusignan, Rhône, France
- Died: 13 July 1998 (aged 83); La Seyne-sur-Mer, Var, France
- Occupation: Actor
- Years active: 1939–1989 (film & TV)

Jean Parédès (1914–1998) was a French film actor.

== Selected filmography ==
- Three from St Cyr (1939) - Bréval
- The Fatted Calf (1939) - Albert - le garçon de café
- The Phantom Carriage (1939) - Un salutiste (uncredited)
- Night in December (1940) - Un figurant
- Les musiciens du ciel (1940) - (uncredited)
- Premier rendez-vous (1941) - Max de Vatremont
- Who Killed Santa Claus? (1941) - Kappel, le sacristain
- Caprices (1942) - Constant
- La Nuit fantastique (1942) - Cadet
- Signé illisible (1942) - Robert Bigard
- Love Letters (1942) - Désiré Ledru
- The White Truck (1943) - Ernest
- Bonsoir mesdames, bonsoir messieurs (1944) - Zéphyr dit Le Ténor sans Voix
- L'aventure est au coin de la rue (1944) - Paul Roulet
- L'extravagante mission (1945) - Hipplyte Castrito
- La Vie de Bohème (1945) - Le vicomte / Il visconte
- 120, Gare Street (1946) - Marc Covet
- Trente et quarante (1946) - Monsieur Leprince
- The Village of Wrath (1947) - Mascaret
- Coincidences (1947) - Montburon
- One Night at the Tabarin (1947)) - Jean
- Le diamant de cent sous (1948) - Charles
- City of Hope (1948) - Albaric
- Toute la famille était là (1948) - Victor Catignac
- My Aunt from Honfleur (1949) - Adolphe
- Scandal on the Champs-Élysées (1949) - Étienne
- Mademoiselle de la Ferté (1949) - Barradère
- The Inn of Sin (1950) - Jacques
- Wedding Night (1950) - Gaston
- Le trésor des Pieds-Nickelés (1950) - Filochard
- Without Trumpet or Drum (1950) - Le fou
- Le gang des tractions-arrière (1950) - Ernest Michaux
- Et moi j'te dis qu'elle t'a fait d'l'oeil! (1950) - Yves Ploumanach
- The Darling of His Concierge (1951) - Eugène Crochard
- Une fille à croquer (1951) - Fou
- Les deux Monsieur de Madame (1951) - Adolphe Gatouillat
- Fanfan la Tulipe (1952) - Le capitaine de la Houlette
- Women Are Angels (1952) - Philogène
- Adorable Creatures (1952) - The Butler (uncredited)
- Beauties of the Night (1952) - Paul - le pharmacien
- Pleasures of Paris (1952) - Albert
- The Happiest of Men (1952) - François Lombard
- The Three Musketeers (1953) - Le comte de Wardes
- Légère et court vêtue (1953) - Gaëtan
- The Lady of the Camellias (1953) - Comte Varville
- After You Duchess (1954) - Jeff
- The Air of Paris (1954) - Jean-Marc
- Madame du Barry (1954) - Lebel
- Cadet Rousselle (1954) - Le général
- French Cancan (1955) - Coudrier
- If Paris Were Told to Us (1956) - Un médecin
- Michel Strogoff (1956) - Alcide Jolivet
- La garçonne (1957) - Edgar Lair
- Love Is at Stake (1957) - De Bérimont
- Filous et compagnie (1957) - Guillaume Donzain
- La Tour, prends garde ! (1958) - Taupin
- Oh! Qué mambo (1959) - Nikita
- The Bureaucrats (1959) - Gorguchon
- Le panier à crabes (1960)
- Girl on the Road (1962) - Le maître d'hôtel
- Du mouron pour les petits oiseaux (1963) - Monsieur Fleurville
- Love Is a Ball (1963) - Freddie
- What's New Pussycat? (1965) - Marcel
- The Double Bed (1965) - L'antiquaire (segment 3 "La répétition")
- Angelique and the King (1966) - Saint-Amon
- Johnny Banco (1967) - L'Anchois
- Astérix et Cléopâtre (1968) - Jules César (voice)
- A Very Curious Girl (1969) - M. Paul, dit La Tisane
- L'homme qui vient de la nuit (1971) - Patrick Tournon
- Papa les petits bateaux... (1971) - Commissaire Duvalier
- Q (1974) - Le premier ministre
- Violette (1978) - Le chanteur de la complaine
- The Lady Banker (1980) - Le directeur de la prison (scenes deleted)
- Engrenage (1980) - Jacques Bhome
- L'émir préfère les blondes (1983) - Le propriétaire du cheval
- Le Bourreau des cœurs (1983) - Max
- La femme ivoire (1984) - M. Desplat
- L'angelo custode (1984)
- Chouans! (1988) - le Chapelain

== Bibliography ==
- Hayward, Susan. French Costume Drama of the 1950s: Fashioning Politics in Film. Intellect Books, 2010.
