= My Aunt from Honfleur (1949 film) =

1949 film

- Directed by: René Jayet
- Written by: Robert Bibal; Jean Guitton
- Based on: My Aunt from Honfleur by Paul Gavault
- Starring: Suzanne Dehelly; Jean Parédès; Paulette Dubost
- Cinematography: René Colas
- Music by: Vincent Scotto
- Production companies: Optimax Films; Art et Industrie Cinématographiques
- Distributed by: Les Films Lutétia
- Release date: 14 April 1949
- Running time: 82 minutes
- Country: France
- Language: French

My Aunt from Honfleur (French: Ma tante d'Honfleur) is a 1949 French comedy film directed by René Jayet and starring Suzanne Dehelly, Jean Parédès and Paulette Dubost. It is based on the 1914 play My Aunt from Honfleur by Paul Gavault.

== Cast ==
- Suzanne Dehelly as Mme Raymond, la tante d'Honfleur
- Jean Parédès as Adolphe
- Roger Nicolas as Charles
- Jeanne Fusier-Gir as Mme Dorlange
- Dorette Ardenne as Yvonne
- Paulette Dubost as Lucette
- Raymond Cordy as Clément
- Roger Bontemps as Le fêtard
- Léo Campion
- Mona Goya
- Charles Dechamps as M. Dorlange
- Colette Georges
- Jacques Grello
- René Marc as Un gendarme
- Léon Pauléon as Livarot
- Robert Rocca as Le maître d'hôtel
- Émile Ronet as Le brigadier
- Nicole Rozan
- Georges Sauval as Le gardien de la tour

== Bibliography ==
- Goble, Alan. The Complete Index to Literary Sources in Film. Walter de Gruyter, 1999.
