= Jean Tissier =

French actor (1896–1973)

- Born: 1 April 1896; Paris, France
- Died: 31 March 1973 (aged 76); Granville, Manche, France
- Occupation: Actor
- Years active: 1932-1972 (film)
- Spouse: Georgette Tissier

Jean Tissier (1896–1973) was a French stage, film and television actor.

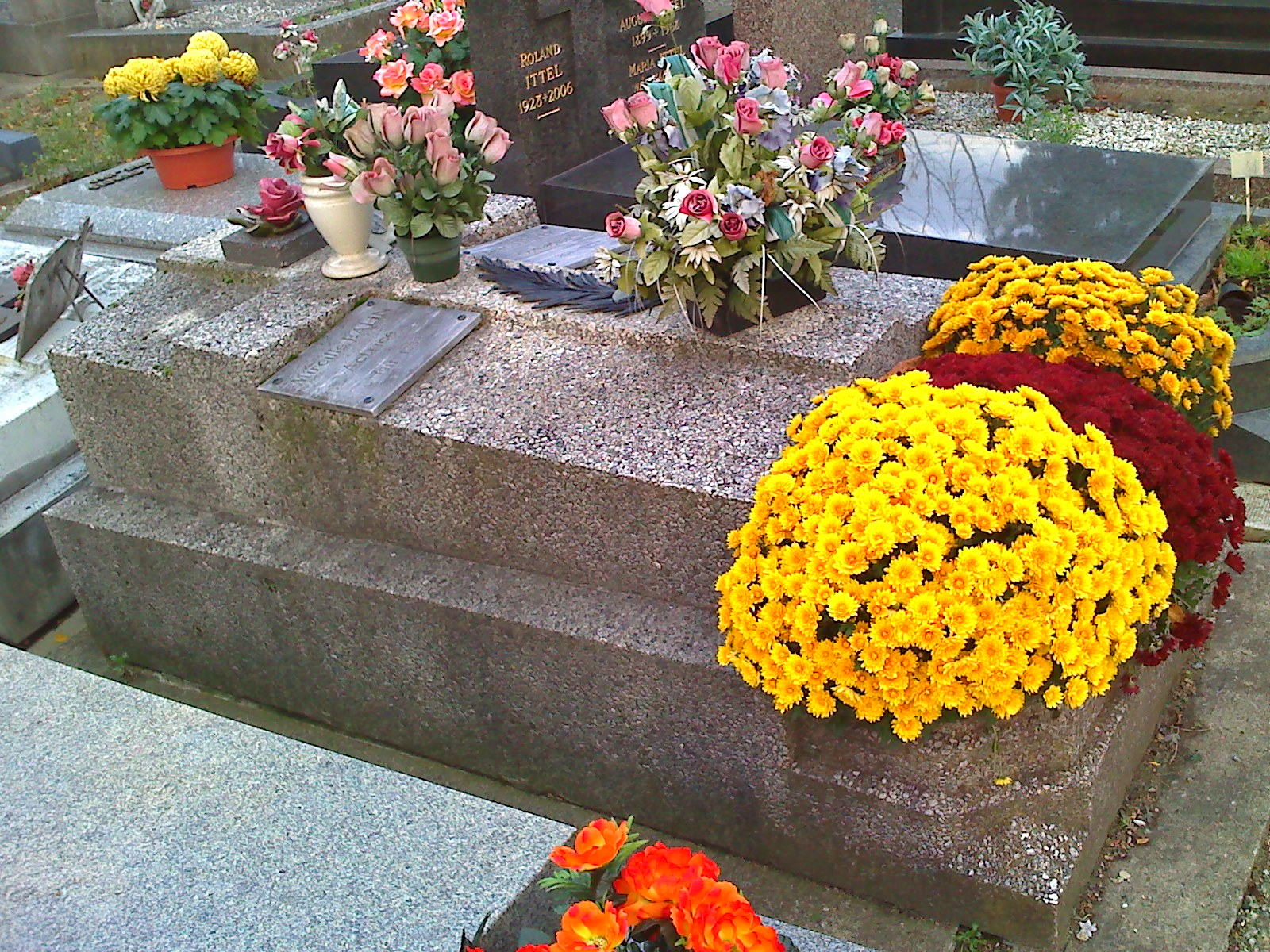
The grave of French actors Mireille Balin and Jean Tissier

A prolific actor, he had more than two hundred fifty appearances on screen during his career. He was married to the actress Georgette Tissier.

== Selected filmography ==
- A Rare Bird (1935)
- The Mascot (1935)
- The Slipper Episode (1935)
- Return to Paradise (1935)
- The Brighton Twins (1936)
- Nitchevo (1936)
- The Great Refrain (1936)
- The Bureaucrats (1936)
- The Club of Aristocrats (1937)
- Boulot the Aviator (1937)
- Blanchette (1937)
- Sarati the Terrible (1937)
- Hercule (1938)
- The Two Schemers (1938)
- Crossroads (1938)
- Alert in the Mediterranean (1938)
- I Was an Adventuress (1938)
- The Little Thing (1938)
- Whirlwind of Paris (1939)
- Case of Conscience (1939)
- Latin Quarter (1939)
- Night in December (1940)
- False Alarm (1940)
- Beating Heart (1940)
- Romance of Paris (1941)
- The Last of the Six (1941)
- The Acrobat (1941)
- The Murderer Lives at Number 21 (1942)
- The Lover of Borneo (1942)
- The Golden Age (1942)
- At Your Command, Madame (1942)
- The Woman I Loved Most (1942)
- Adrien (1943)
- Picpus (1943)
- Lucrèce (1943)
- The Ménard Collection (1944)
- The Black Cavalier (1945)
- The Eleventh Hour Guest (1945)
- The Faceless Enemy (1946)
- The Captain (1946)
- Lessons in Conduct (1946)
- Her Final Role (1946)
- Rendezvous in Paris (1947)
- The Adventures of Casanova (1947)
- The Spice of Life (1948)
- City of Hope (1948)
- The Eleven O'Clock Woman (1948)
- The Ladies in the Green Hats (1949)
- The Nude Woman (1949)
- The Widow and the Innocent (1949)
- Rome Express (1950)
- Blonde (1950)
- Vendetta in Camargue (1950)
- The Unexpected Voyager (1950)
- Minne (1950)
- The Bread Peddler (1950)
- Messalina (1951)
- Come Down, Someone Wants You (1951)
- Rendezvous in Grenada (1951)
- The Little Cardinals (1951)
- That Rascal Anatole (1951)
- This Age Without Pity (1952)
- Twelve Hours of Happiness (1952)
- The Beauty of Cadiz (1953)
- The Cucuroux Family (1953)
- When Do You Commit Suicide? (1953)
- Alarm in Morocco (1953)
- A Caprice of Darling Caroline (1953)
- Naked in the Wind (1953)
- My Childish Father (1953)
- Double or Quits (1953)
- Little Jacques (1953)
- Royal Affairs in Versailles (1954)
- It's the Paris Life (1954)
- Adam Is Eve (1954)
- Crime at the Concert Mayol (1954)
- The Count of Bragelonne (1954)
- Scandal in Montmartre (1955)
- My Priest Among the Poor (1956)
- Baratin (1956)
- A Night at the Moulin Rouge (1957)
- The Inspector Likes a Fight (1957)
- And Your Sister? (1958)
- Life Together (1958)
- Marie of the Isles (1959)
- The Enigma of the Folies-Bergere (1959)
- Vice Squad (1959)
- Not Three (1964)
- The Duke's Gold (1965)
- The Gardener of Argenteuil (1966)

== Bibliography ==
- Goble, Alan. The Complete Index to Literary Sources in Film. Walter de Gruyter, 1999.
