= Chourinette =

1934 film

- Directed by: André Hugon
- Written by: Georges Berr
- Produced by: Joseph N. Ermolieff; André Hugon
- Starring: Mireille Hartuch; Frédéric Duvallès; Jean Sinoël
- Cinematography: Marc Bujard; Georges Kostal
- Edited by: Maurice Serein
- Music by: Jacques Janin
- Production company: Films André Hugon
- Distributed by: Gaumont-Franco Film-Aubert
- Release date: 2 March 1934
- Running time: 95 minutes
- Country: France
- Language: French

Chourinette is a 1934 French comedy drama film directed by André Hugon and starring Mireille Hartuch, Frédéric Duvallès and Jean Sinoël. The film's sets were designed by Robert-Jules Garnier.

== Synopsis ==
When parental interference prevents a young lawyer from marrying his beloved he plans to commit suicide. The arrival of his fiancée prevents this and the two escape together to a provincial relative's house.

== Cast ==
- Mireille Hartuch as Chourinette
- Frédéric Duvallès as Laloupe
- Jean Sinoël as Pêchelune
- Yvonne Hébert as Jacqueline
- Antonin Berval as Vernonet
- Marguerite Templey as Madame Tourtier
- Pierre de Guingand as Ferdinand de Brézolles
- Robert Allard
- André Bertic
- Édouard Delmont
- Robert Goupil
- Raoul Marco
- Maximilienne
- Germaine Michel
- Andrée Pasty

== Bibliography ==
- Bessy, Maurice & Chirat, Raymond. Histoire du cinéma français: 1929-1934. Pygmalion, 1988.
- Crisp, Colin. Genre, Myth and Convention in the French Cinema, 1929-1939. Indiana University Press, 2002.
- Rège, Philippe. Encyclopedia of French Film Directors, Volume 1. Scarecrow Press, 2009.
