= Guillaume de Sax =

Belgian actor

- Born: Guillaume Henri Robert de Segur Lamoignon; December 23, 1889; Belgium
- Died: November 6, 1945 (aged 55); Paris, France
- Occupation: Actor
- Years active: 1937–1945
- Spouse: Cécile Sorel (m. 1926; sep. 1941)

Guillaume de Sax (1889–1945) was a Belgian actor.

De Sax was born Guillaume Henri Robert de Segur Lamoignon in Belgium and died in France. He was married to the actress Cécile Sorel.

== Partial filmography ==
- Ernest the Rebel (1938)
- Three Waltzes (1938)
- I Was an Adventuress (1938)
- Coral Reefs (1939)
- Immediate Call (1939)
- Angelica (1939)
- Cristobal's Gold (1940)
- Sins of Youth (1941)
- Miss Bonaparte (1942)
- The Lover of Borneo (1942)
- No Love Allowed (1942)
- Twisted Mistress (1942)
- Colonel Pontcarral (1942)
- Strange Inheritance (1943)
- La Main du diable (1943)
- Picpus (1943)
- Vautrin (1943)
- Farandole (1945)
- The Eleventh Hour Guest (1945)

== Bibliography ==
- Waldman, Harry. Maurice Tourneur: The Life and Films. McFarland & Co, 2008.
