= Monsieur de Falindor =

1947 film

- Directed by: René Le Hénaff
- Written by: René Le Hénaff; Gil Roland
- Based on: Monsieur de Falindor by Armand Vérhylle and Georges Manoir
- Produced by: André Hugon; Marcel Bertrou
- Starring: Jacqueline Dor; Pierre Jourdan; Gilbert Gil
- Cinematography: Raymond Agnel
- Edited by: Marinette Cadix
- Music by: Louis Beydts
- Production companies: Berton et Compagnie; Films André Hugon
- Distributed by: Cinéma de France
- Release date: 29 January 1947
- Running time: 75 minutes
- Country: France
- Language: French

Monsieur de Falindor is a 1947 French comedy film directed by René Le Hénaff and starring Jacqueline Dor, Pierre Jourdan and Jacqueline Dor, Pierre Jourdan and Gilbert Gil. The film's sets were designed by the art director Raymond Nègre.

== Cast ==
- Jacqueline Dor as Annette de Royval
- Pierre Jourdan as Maxime de Falindor
- Marcelle Duval as Dame Hermance
- Françoise Féron as Gabrielle de Savoisy
- Gilbert Gil as Maître Basilius
- Michel Gudin as Saturnin de Royval
- Gil Roland as Maître Basilius
- Janine Viénot as Diane de Vimeuil

== Bibliography ==
- Goble, Alan. The Complete Index to Literary Sources in Film. Walter de Gruyter, 1999.
- Rège, Philippe. Encyclopedia of French Film Directors, Volume 1. Scarecrow Press, 2009.
