= Georges Rollin =

- Born: 6 April 1912; Pont-à-Mousson, Meurthe-et-Moselle, France
- Died: March 1964 (aged 51); France
- Occupation: Actor
- Years active: 1933-1964 (film)

Georges Rollin (1912–1964) was a French film actor.

== Selected filmography ==
- Ultimatum (1938)
- J'accuse! (1938)
- The Most Beautiful Girl in the World (1938)
- Final Accord (1938)
- Notre-Dame de la Mouise (1941)
- The Last of the Six (1941)
- The Chain Breaker (1941)
- Love Marriage (1942)
- The Law of Spring (1942)
- Annette and the Blonde Woman (1942)
- The Trump Card (1942)
- It Happened at the Inn (1943)
- The Man Without a Name (1943)
- Father Goriot (1945)
- False Identity (1947)
- The Sky Sorcerer (1949)
- The Woman with the Orchid (1952)
- The Cucuroux Family (1953)
- The Congress of Mother-in-Laws (1954)

== Bibliography ==
- Greco, Joseph. The File on Robert Siodmak in Hollywood, 1941-1951. Universal-Publishers, 1999.
