= André Alerme =

French actor (1877–1960)

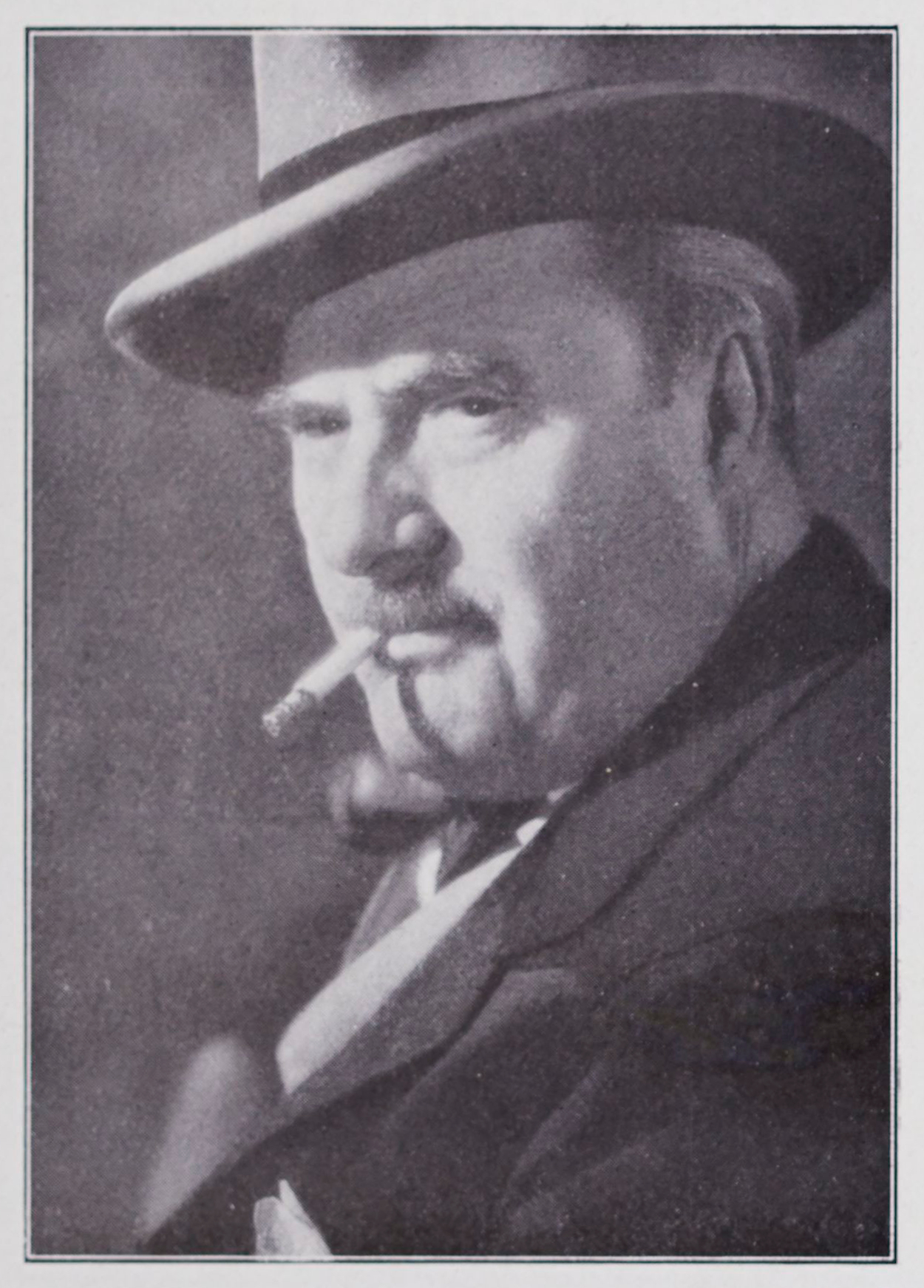
Alerme while appearing in the play The Train for Venice (1937)

André Alerme (9 September 1877 – 31 January 1960) was a French actor.

Alerme was born Marie André Alerme in Dieppe, Seine-Maritime, France and died at the age of 82 in Montrichard, Loir-et-Cher, France.

== Selected filmography ==
- Black and White (1931)
- His Highness Love (1931)
- The Wonderful Day (1932)
- Orange Blossom (1932)
- His Best Client (1932)
- La dame de chez Maxim's (1933)
- Miquette (1934)
- The Ideal Woman (1934)
- Hotel Free Exchange (1934)
- Tovaritch (1935)
- Happy Arenas (1935)
- Ferdinand the Roisterer (1935)
- Carnival in Flanders (1935)
- On the Road (1936)
- The Secret of Polichinelle (1936)
- Counsel for Romance (1936)
- The Great Refrain (1936)
- The Assault (1936)
- The Man of the Hour (1937)
- Balthazar (1937)
- The Silent Battle (1937)
- Mademoiselle ma mère (1938)
- My Priest Among the Rich (1938)
- Final Accord (1938)
- Le drame de Shanghaï (1938)
- Education of a Prince (1938)
- Nord-Atlantique (1939)
- Paradise Lost (1940)
- Romance of Paris (1941)
- Last Adventure (1942)
- Patricia (1942)
- The Lover of Borneo (1942)
- The Golden Age (1942)
- Twisted Mistress (1942)
- Love Letters (1942)
- The Blue Veil (1942)
- The Phantom Baron (1943)
- Arlette and Love (1943)
- The White Waltz (1943)
- The Man Without a Name (1943)
- Farandole (1945)
- The Black Cavalier (1945)
- The Misfortunes of Sophie (1946)
- Lessons in Conduct (1946)
- The Tragic Dolmen (1948)
- Banco de Prince (1950)
- This Age Without Pity (1952)
