= Clérambard =

1969 film directed by Yves Robert

- Directed by: Yves Robert
- Screenplay by: Jean-Loup Dabadie; Yves Robert
- Based on: Marcel Aymé's play (1950)
- Produced by: Alain Poiré; Yves Robert
- Starring: Philippe Noiret; Dany Carrel; Lise Delamare
- Cinematography: René Mathelin
- Edited by: Ghislaine Desjonquères
- Music by: Vladimir Cosma
- Distributed by: Gaumont Distribution
- Release date: 1969
- Running time: 100 minutes
- Country: France
- Language: French

Clérambard is a 1969 French comedy film directed by Yves Robert and starring Philippe Noiret, Dany Carrel and Lise Delamare. It is based on the 1950 play by Marcel Aymé. Set in France shortly before 1914, it tells the story of an impoverished aristocrat who undergoes a religious conversion and, abandoning his ancestral castle, takes his family to live like gypsies.

== Plot ==
In a crumbling medieval castle, the penniless Count of Clérembard tyrannises his wife, his son Octave, and his mother-in-law. Their only income comes from knitting and selling pullovers, and their only meat from what the Count can shoot in the vicinity. The local lawyer, Galuchon, offers to pay off the Count's vast debts if Octave will marry the eldest of his three daughters: the youngest is a beauty, the next pretty, and the eldest a fright. While the Count is ready to grab this solution to his problems, Octave rebels. Though he has never been able to afford her, he is in love with La Langouste, the town's prostitute.

Gustalin, a neighbouring farmer fed up with his livestock disappearing to the Count's gun, decides to give him a fright. Dressing as St Francis of Assisi, he suddenly appears before him and gives him a book of the saint's deeds. On reading it, the Count decides to renounce all worldly goods and, after selling the castle to Galuchon, to take to the road with his family in a gypsy caravan, sharing the life of the poor and communing with nature. If Octave really loves La Langouste, why shouldn't he marry her? She is half-convinced about retiring from her trade and gives Octave a free session.

When Galuchon arrives to sign the deed for the sale of the castle, he brings his three daughters. Octave, emboldened by his experience with La Langouste, takes the youngest into the empty caravan and afterwards tells Galuchon that he will marry her in return for an annual allowance. The Count is sorry that La Langouste has been jilted and says she can join them in the caravan anyhow. Gustalin reappears to say that he is sorry to have misled the Count, who has now lost his castle, but the Count doesn't mind as he is set on his new life. In the town square, the people see two angels harness his horse to the caravan and they all follow it out into the countryside.

== Cast ==
- Philippe Noiret as Hector, Count of Clérambard
- Martine Sarcey as Louise, Countess of Clérambard
- Gérard Lartigau as Octave, their son
- Lise Delamare as Madame de Léré, mother of Louise
- Dany Carrel as La Langouste
- Robert Dalban as Gustalin, the neighbouring farmer
- Claude Piéplu as Maître Galuchon, the lawyer
- Lyne Chardonnet as Brigitte Galuchon
- Josiane Lévêque as Évelyne Galuchon
- Françoise Arnaud as Étiennette Galuchon
- Roger Carel as The parish priest

== Production ==
Principal photography took place from 14 April to 14 June 1969, with filming locations including Dijon, Marigny-le-Cahouët and Semur-en-Auxois.
