= Au diable la vertu =

1953 film by Jean Laviron

- Directed by: Jean Laviron
- Written by: François Chalais; Jean Laviron
- Produced by: Les Films Marceau - Arca Films (France)
- Starring: Henri Génès; Louis de Funès
- Music by: Daniel White
- Distributed by: Les Films Marceau
- Release date: 3 May 1953 (France)
- Running time: 90 minutes
- Country: France
- Language: French

Au diable la vertu (English: To hell with virtuousness), is a French comedy film from 1954, directed by Jean Laviron, written by François Chalais, starring Henri Génès and Louis de Funès. The scenario was based on the work of Jean Guitton – "Elle attendait ça".

== Cast ==
- Henri Génès : Pierre Montabel, businessman
- Liliane Bert : Gisèle Montabel, wife Pierre
- Julien Carette : Mr Tellier, the manager of the private agency
- Maurice Regamey : Jacques Lambert, the associate of Pierre
- Félix Oudart : the Merciful canon, the brother of Miss de St-Hilaire
- Lili Bontemps : Monique, the friend of Jacques
- Christian Duvaleix : Robert Crémieux, the thief
- Louis de Funès : Mr Lorette, the clerk of the judge of education
- Robert Vattier : the judge of education
- Catherine Gay : Rita Johnson, the stripper
- Simone Paris : Mss de St-Hilaire, the limited partner
- Josselin : Maître Nivert, the lawyer having lost the voice of Pierre
- Albert Rémy : Henri, the servant of "Montabel"
- Gaston Orbal : Norbert Demorey, the president of the association
- Frédéric Bart : the inspector Perrini
- Jim Gérald : the movie director of striptease
- Nicole Jonesco : Hélène
- Jack Ary : the state trooper of nurse
- André Numès Fils : the agent bringing convocation
- Crésus : the fiancé of Hélène
- André Dalibert : a spectator in striptease
