= The Eleventh Hour Guest =

1945 film

- Directed by: Maurice Cloche
- Written by: Maurice Cloche; Jean Ferry; Nino Frank
- Produced by: François Chavane
- Starring: Jean Tissier; Blanchette Brunoy; Roger Pigaut
- Cinematography: Marcel Grignon
- Edited by: Raymond Lamy
- Music by: Georges Van Parys
- Production company: Éclair-Journal
- Distributed by: Éclair-Journal
- Release date: 15 August 1945
- Running time: 90 minutes
- Country: France
- Language: French

The Eleventh Hour Guest (French: L'invité de la onzième heure) is a 1945 French mystery film directed by Maurice Cloche and starring Jean Tissier, Blanchette Brunoy and Roger Pigaut. It was shot at the Billancourt Studios in Paris. The film's sets were designed by the art directors Maurice Colasson and Georges Wakhévitch.

== Synopsis ==
An inventor claims to have invented an incredible new machine which acts as a thought detector amongst other things. On the evening he unveils it to his family and intended wife, tragedy strikes and he is found dead.

== Cast ==
- Jean Tissier as Christophe Berri
- Roger Pigaut as Le docteur Rémi Lambert
- Blanchette Brunoy as Antoinette Langeais
- Junie Astor as Isabelle Bourgoin
- Lily Baron as Olga
- Guillaume de Sax as Thomas Bourgoin
- Marcel Delaître as Monsieur Sulnac
- André Fouché as Serge
- René Génin as Calixte
- Jean Hébey as Frédéric
- Lily Mounet as Madame Sulnac
- Georgette Tissier as La soubrette

== Bibliography ==
- Rège, Philippe. Encyclopedia of French Film Directors, Volume 1. Scarecrow Press, 2009.
