= Lise Delamare =

French actress (1913–2006)

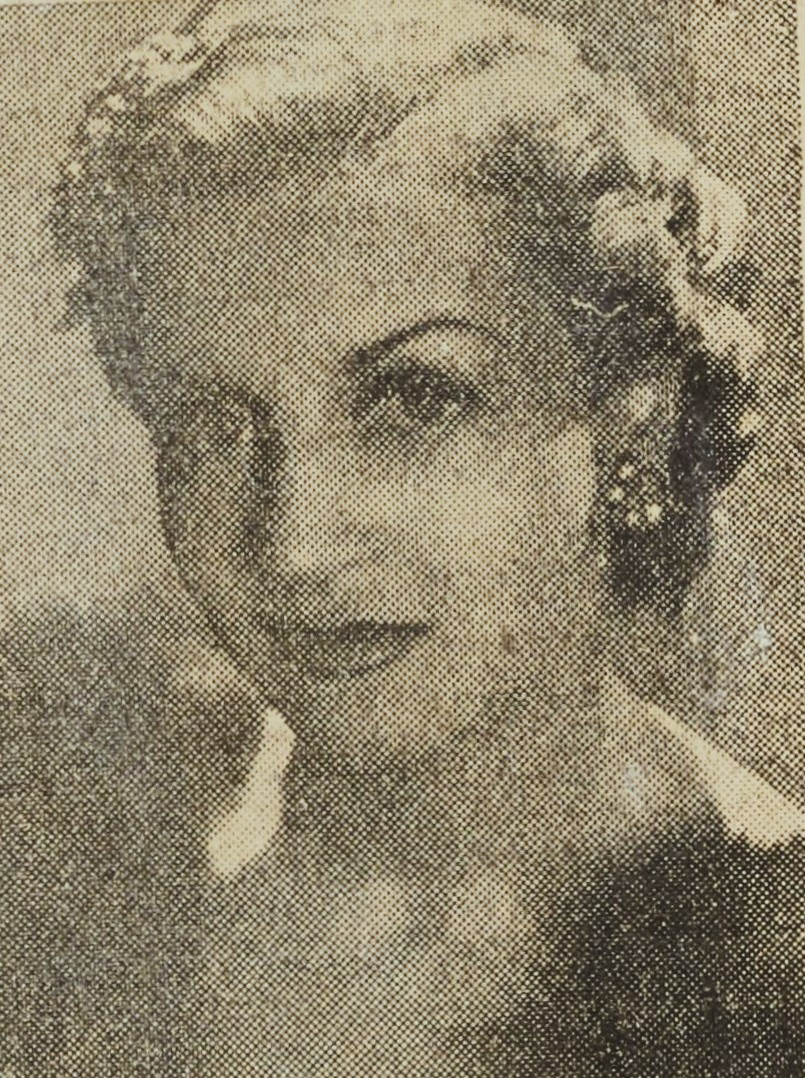
- Born: Jolyse Effrey Jeanne Delamare; 9 April 1913; Colombes, Seine-Saint-Denis, Île-de-France, France
- Died: 25 July 2006 (aged 93); Paris, France
- Occupations: Film actor Television actor
- Years active: 1933–1991

Lise Delamare (born Jolyse Effrey Jeanne Delamare; 9 April 1913 – 25 July 2006) was a French stage and film actress.

== Partial filmography ==
- George and Georgette (1934)
- Les précieuses ridicules (1934)
- Pension Mimosas (1935) – Nelly
- Notre-Dame d'amour (1936) – Roseline
- The Cheat (1937) – Denise Moret
- La Marseillaise (1938) – La Reine Marie-Antoinette
- Sins of Youth (1941) – Madeleine
- The Duchess of Langeais (1942) – Madame de Serizy
- La Symphonie fantastique (1942) – Harriet Smithson
- Twisted Mistress (1942) – Hélène
- Le Destin fabuleux de Désirée Clary (1942) – Joséphine de Beauharnais
- The Count of Monte Cristo (1943) – Haydée (French version only)
- The White Waltz (1943) – Hélène Madelin
- Sowing the Wind (1944) – Fernande
- Farandole (1945) – Blanche
- Father Goriot (1945) – Madame de Beauséant
- Lunegarde (1946) – Madame de Vertumne
- Raboliot (1946) – Flora
- The Captain (1946) – Léonora Galigai
- Monsieur Vincent (1947) – Françoise Marguerite de Silly, comtesse de Joigny
- A Certain Mister (1950) – Madame Lecorduvent
- The King of the Bla Bla Bla (1950) – Lucienne Lafare
- The Grand Maneuver (1955) – Juliette Duverger
- Lola Montès (1955) – Mrs. Craigie, Lola's mother
- Escapade (1957) – Mme. Mercenay
- Nathalie (1957) – La comtesse de Lancy
- L'ennemi dans l'ombre (1960) – La marquise
- Captain Blood (1960) – Marie de Médicis
- Bernadette of Lourdes (1961) – La mère générale
- Vive Henri IV... vive l'amour! (1961) – Mme de Montglat
- Les démons de minuit (1961)
- Clérambard (1969) – Madame de Lere
- Hail the Artist (1973) – Lucienne – l'actrice qui joue Lady Rosemond
- Baxter (1998) – Madame Deville
