= The White Waltz =

1943 film

- Directed by: Jean Stelli
- Written by: François Campaux; Jean Stelli
- Produced by: Raymond Artus
- Starring: Lise Delamare; André Alerme; Aimé Clariond
- Cinematography: René Gaveau
- Edited by: Claude Nicole
- Music by: René Sylviano
- Production company: Compagnie Générale Cinématographique
- Distributed by: La Société des Films Sirius
- Release date: 15 December 1943
- Running time: 100 minutes
- Country: France
- Language: French

The White Waltz (French: La valse blanche) is a 1943 French drama film directed by Jean Stelli and starring Lise Delamare, André Alerme and Aimé Clariond. It was produced and released during the German occupation of France.

== Synopsis ==
Bernard, a promising composer is engaged to Hélène, but is jealous of her relationship with Professor d'Estérel who she assists. After an argument he goes out into heavy rain and falls ill. He is sent to a sanatorium in the mountains to recover. There he encounters Jacqueline, a girl he once knew at the conservatoire, who is dying of tuberculosis. To try and soften the last weeks of her life he pretends to romance her. Hélène also helps to support this act of kindness.

== Cast ==
- Lise Delamare as Hélène Madelin
- André Alerme as Monsieur Despillois
- Aimé Clariond as Le professeur d'Estérel
- Julien Bertheau as Bernard Lampré
- Ariane Borg as Jacqueline Lorbodsen dite Jackie
- Marcelle Géniat as Nany
- Raymond Cordy as Le peintre René Dupré
- Marcelle Monthil as Mademoiselle Zamb
- Michel de Bonnay as Jeannot
- Annette Poivre as Lily
- Paul Barge as Le concierge
- Lucien Desagneaux as Un élève du Conservatoire
- Luce Fabiole as La mère de Jeannot
- Georges Gosset as L'ami d'Hélène
- Albert Morys as Un malade
- Maurice Tricard as Le docteur Bohains
- Roger Vincent as Le critique

== Bibliography ==
- Rège, Philippe. Encyclopedia of French Film Directors, Volume 1. Scarecrow Press, 2009.
- Weber, Alain. La bataille du film: 1933-1945, le cinéma français entre allégeance et résistance. Ramsay, 2007.
