= André Lavagne =

French composer

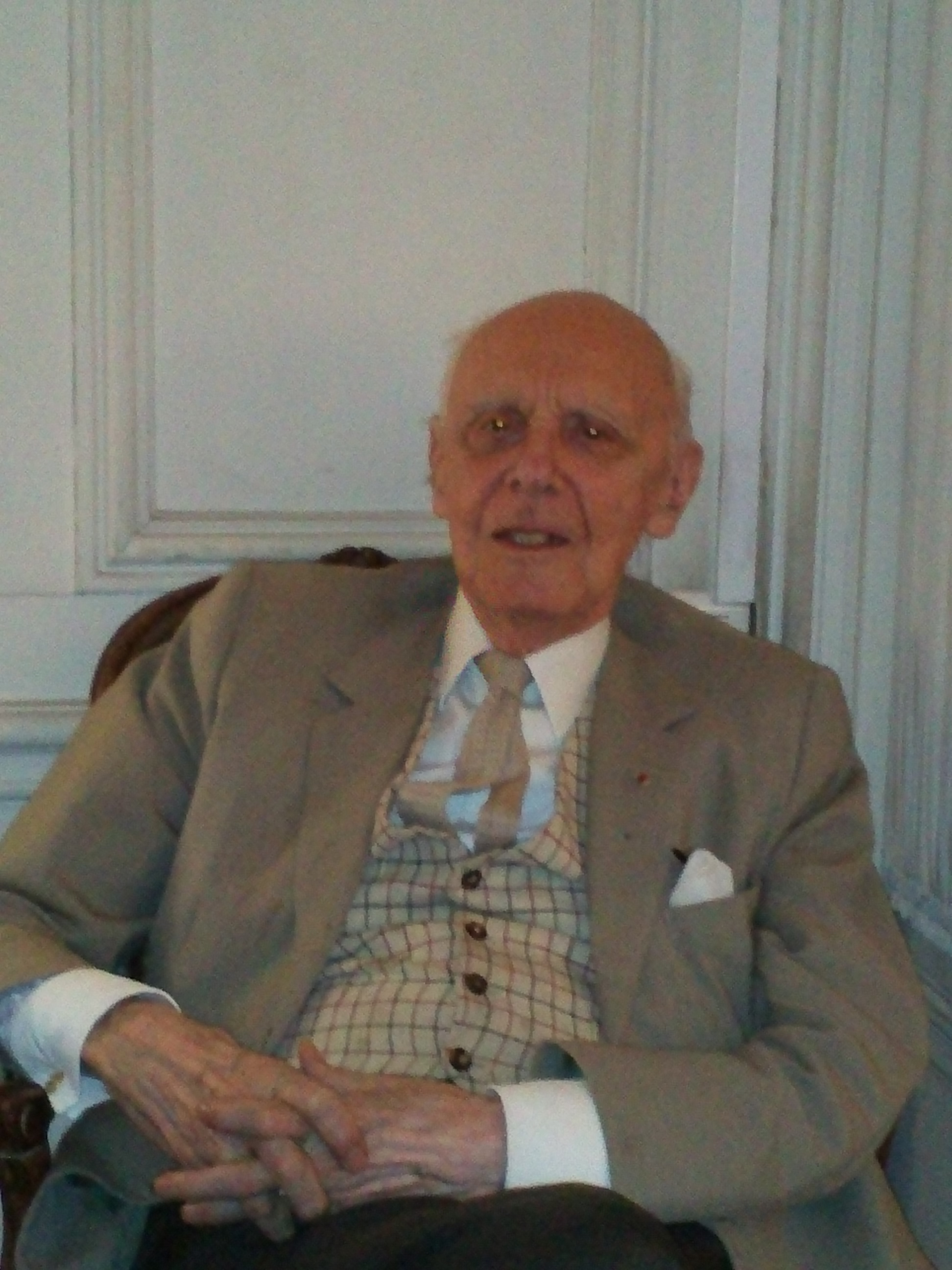
André Lavagne in May 2012

André Lavagne (12 July 1913 – 21 March 2014) was a French composer. He mostly worked on short movies, such as: L'amour maternel chez les animaux (1944) and Un amour de parapluie (1951). He was born in Paris. Lavagne died from natural causes on 21 March 2014 in Paris. He was 100 years old.
