= Légère et court vêtue =

1953 film

- Directed by: Jean Laviron
- Written by: Jean Guitton; Jean Laviron
- Produced by: Arca Films (France)
- Starring: Madeleine Lebeau; Louis de Funès
- Music by: Daniel White
- Distributed by: D.F.F.
- Release date: 6 November 1953 (France)
- Running time: 88 minutes
- Country: France
- Language: French

Légère et court vêtue ('Light and court dressed'), is a French comedy film from 1953, directed by Jean Laviron, written by Jean Guitton, starring Madeleine Lebeau and Louis de Funès. The scenario was based on the work of Jean Guitton Un amour fou ('A crazy love').

== Cast ==
- Madeleine Lebeau : Jacqueline Vermorel, wife of Jacques
- Jean Parédès : Gaétan, the unknown "madman"
- Jacqueline Pierreux : Simone, Pierre's lover
- Jacques-Henri Duval : Pierre Plouvier, an admirer of Jacqueline
- Pierre Destailles : Maître Jacques Vermorel, advocate
- Louis de Funès : Paul Duvernois, the alleged detective
- Nicole Jonesco : Hélène, advocate's maid
- Verlor et Darvil : the singers of the generic song
