= The Bureaucrats (1936 film) =

1936 film

- Directed by: Yves Mirande
- Written by: Georges Courteline (novel); Yves Mirande
- Produced by: Bernard Simon
- Starring: Lucien Baroux; Pierre Larquey; Gabriel Signoret
- Cinematography: Charles Bauer; Marius Raichi; Charles Van Enger
- Edited by: Maurice Serein; M.J. Yvanne
- Music by: Armand Bernard; André Hornez
- Production company: Paris Ciné Films
- Distributed by: Compagnie Commerciale Française Cinématographique
- Release date: 15 December 1936
- Running time: 95 minutes
- Country: France
- Language: French

The Bureaucrats (French: Messieurs les ronds de cuir) is a 1936 French comedy film directed by Yves Mirande and starring Lucien Baroux, Pierre Larquey and Gabriel Signoret. It was remade as 1959 film of the same title.

== Plot ==
The film, which is a satire of government bureaucracy, is about public servants who spend so much time sitting in their office chairs that they need to order special cushions for their buttocks. The premise is referenced in the original French title Messieurs les ronds de cuir, which translates into Men with the leather circles, alludes to.

== Cast ==
- Lucien Baroux as Lahrier
- Pierre Larquey as Le conservateur
- Gabriel Signoret as M. Soupe
- Saturnin Fabre as Le tondu
- Roger Duchesne as Chavarax
- Jean Tissier as Nègre
- Josette Day as Mme Chavarax
- Arletty as La belle-soeur de la hourmerie
- Armand Lurville as La Hourmerie
- Georges Bever as Ovide
- André Numès Fils as Sainthomme
- Betty Spell as Mlle de Rocroy
- Jeanne Véniat as Mme La Hourmerie
- Paul Faivre as Van der Hogen
- Emile Saulieu as Le concierge
- Léonce Corne as Le chef du service des expéditions
- Simone Chobillon

== Production ==
The film's sets were designed by the art director René Renoux.

== Bibliography ==
- Andrews, Dudley. Mists of Regret: Culture and Sensibility in Classic French Film. Princeton University Press, 1995.
