= Pierre Larquey =

French actor (1884–1962)

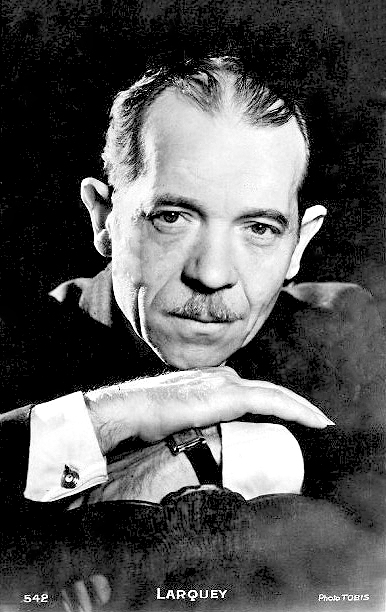
- Larquey c. 1935
- Born: 10 July 1884; Cénac, Gironde, France
- Died: 17 April 1962 (aged 77); Maisons-Laffitte, France
- Occupation: Actor
- Years active: 1913-1962

Pierre Larquey (10 July 1884 – 17 April 1962) was a French film actor. He appeared in more than 200 films between 1913 and 1962. Born in Cénac, Gironde, France, he died in Maisons-Laffitte at the age of 77.

== Selected filmography ==
- Patrie (1914)
- Monsieur le directeur (1925)
- Alone (1931) - Le comandant
- Tout s'arrange (1931) - Un ami de M. Ribadet
- American Love (1931) - Le maître d'hôtel à la barbiche (uncredited)
- Le disparu de l'ascenseur (1932) - Michaud - le secrétaire
- Prisonnier de mon coeur (1932)
- Vive la classe (1932) - L'adjudant
- The Miracle Child (1932) - Durieux père
- Le chien jaune (1932) - (uncredited)
- Topaze (1933) - Tamise
- Once Upon a Time (1933) - Redno
- Knock (1933) - Le tambour de ville
- Un fil à la patte (1933) - Bouzin
- Madame Bovary (1934) - Hippolyte
- Mariage à responsabilité limitée (1934) - Georges Lambert - le mari
- We Are Not Children (1934) - M. Breton
- Street Without a Name (1934)
- Les Misérables (1934) - L'employé de Mairie (uncredited)
- The Scandal (1934) - Parizot
- Casanova (1934) - Pogomas
- Vive la compagnie (1934) - Le sergent Poponaz
- Le Grand Jeu (1934) - Gustin
- Le paquebot Tenacity (1934) - L'ivrogne
- La cinquième empreinte (1934) - Richard - le pâtissier
- Poliche (1934)
- Le greluchon délicat (1934) - Paperhanger
- Three Sailors (1934) - Gruchon
- If I Were Boss (1934) - Jules
- L'école des contribuables (1934) - Menu
- A Man of Gold (1934) - Moineau
- Hotel Free Exchange (1934) - Pinglet
- Le cavalier Lafleur (1934) - Gonfaron
- L'auberge du Petit-Dragon (1934) - Le commissaire
- Dedê (1934) - (uncredited)
- Zouzou (1934) - Papa Melé
- Gold in the Street (1934) - Adolphe Tourbier - un chimiste
- Antonia (1935) - Le garçon
- Compartiment de dames seules (1935) - Monicourt
- Bux the Clown (1935) - Le clown Boum
- Justin de Marseille (1935) - Le Bègue
- Gangster malgré lui (1935)
- A Rare Bird (1935) - Valentin
- Le chant de l'amour (1935) - Casimir
- Second Bureau (1935) - Asjundant Colleret
- La rosière des Halles (1935) - Lucien Dunois
- J'aime toutes les femmes (1935) - Wessmaier
- Beautiful Days (1935) - Le père de Pierre
- Fanfare of Love (1935) - Emile
- The Squadron's Baby (1935) - Le fonctionnaire Mazure
- Un soir de bombe (1935) - Baudry-Duclin & Basu
- À la manière de... (1935) - Monsieur Fine, le prétendant de Madame Capefigue
- La marmaille (1935) - Bouton
- La petite sauvage (1935) - Dagobert, le concierge
- La mariée du régiment (1936)
- Taras Bulba (1936) - Sachka
- Le roman d'un spahi (1936) - Le colonel
- A Hen on a Wall (1936) - Bob Pouvrier
- Disk 413 (1936) - Belinsky - le fonctionnaire
- Seven Men, One Woman (1936) - L'entrepreneur Langlois
- Prête-moi ta femme (1936) - Adolphe Rissolin
- Les grands (1936) - Chamboulin
- Ménilmontant (1936) - Le père Jos
- The Bureaucrats (1936) - Le conservateur
- The Dying Land (1936) - Le père Lumineau
- La main passe (1936)
- La joueuse d'orgue (1936) - Magloire
- Romarin (1937) - Larquus
- La loupiote (1937) - Le père Ballot
- Trois artilleurs au pensionnat (1937) - Félicien, le pharmacien
- La griffe du hasard (1937) - Monsieur Lappe
- Police mondaine (1937) - Le commissaire Gustave Picard
- Rendez-vous Champs-Elysées (1937) - Totor
- The Citadel of Silence (1937) - Bartek
- Mademoiselle ma mère (1937) - Le patron de l'hostellerie
- The Club of Aristocrats (1937) - Miser
- The Green Jacket (1937) - Pinchet - le secrétaire perpétuel de l'Institut
- The Ladies in the Green Hats (1937) - Ulysse Hyacinthe
- Un scandale aux galeries (1937) - Monsieur Lafila
- Nights of Princes (1938) - Chouvaloff
- Titin des Martigues (1938) - Lacroustille
- Le monsieur de 5 heures (1938) - Montredon
- That's Sport (1938) - Trapon
- Un soir à Marseille (1938) - Parpèle, le reporter
- The Girls of the Rhône (1938) - Fabregas
- Trois artilleurs en vadrouille (1938) - Le pharmacien Zéphitard
- Clodoche (1938) - Clodoche
- Adrienne Lecouvreur (1938) - Pitou
- Un fichu métier (1938) - Casimir
- Véréna's Wedding (1938) - Gustav Peters
- Monsieur Coccinelle (1938) - Alfred Coccinelle
- Mother Love (1938) - Raoul Dalaciaud - le patron de Gilbert
- Prince de mon coeur (1938) - Sekow - le préfet de police
- The City of Lights (1938) - Alexis
- Three Artillerymen at the Opera (1938) - Zéphitard
- Un gosse en or (1939) - Durand
- Les gangsters du château d'If (1939) - Esprit Saint
- Fort Dolorès (1939) - Jefke Vandenbom - le Belge
- The Mayor's Dilemma (1939) - Fabien, l'huissier
- Midnight Tradition (1939) - Béatrix
- Grandfather (1939) - Grand-père
- His Uncle from Normandy (1939) - Maître Curot
- Une main a frappé (1939) - Valtat et Toto-la-Puce
- The Emigrant (1940) - Monrozat
- Sixième étage (1940) - Hochepot
- L'empreinte du Dieu (1940) - Mosselmanns
- Moulin Rouge (1941) - Perval
- Hopes (1941) - Martin
- Fromont jeune et Risler aîné (1941)
- Portrait of Innocence (1941) - Le père Finot
- Pension Jonas (1942) - Barnabé Tignol
- The Newspaper Falls at Five O'Clock (1942) - Phalanpin
- The Lover of Borneo (1942) - Lajoie
- Soyez les bienvenus (1942) - Le régisseur
- Le Lit à colonnes (1942) - Dix-Doigts
- Chiffon's Wedding (1942) - Jean
- The Murderer Lives at Number 21 (1942) - Monsieur Colin
- The Blue Veil (1942) - Antoine Lancelot
- The Benefactor (1942) - Noblet
- La grande marnière (1943) - Malaizot
- Une étoile au soleil (1943)
- Des jeunes filles dans la nuit (1943) - Anatole Bonnefous
- La Main du diable (1943) - Ange
- The Secret of Madame Clapain (1943) - Hurteaux
- The Man Who Sold His Soul (1943) - L'abbé Lampin
- Le Corbeau (1943) - Le docteur Michel Vorzet
- The Angel of the Night (1944) - Heurteloup (uncredited)
- La Rabouilleuse (1944) - Jean-Jacques Rouget
- The Ménard Collection (1944) - Le psychiatre fou
- Father Goriot (1945) - Le père Goriot
- Sylvie and the Ghost (1946) - Baron Eduard
- Faut ce qu'il faut (1946)
- Song of the Clouds (1946) - Le jardinier du château
- La Tentation de Barbizon (1946) - Jérôme Chambon
- Jericho (1946) - Béquille
- Goodbye Darling (1946) - Édouard
- Six Hours to Lose (1947) - Joseph
- Sybille's Night (1947) - Ancelin
- La colère des dieux (1947) - Emmanuel
- The Woman in Red (1947) - Le père Simon
- Quai des Orfèvres (1947) - Emile Lafour, un chauffeur de taxi
- La cabane aux souvenirs (1947) - Le Pacha
- Four Knaves (1947) - Arthur Bonpain - un cambrioleur
- Cab Number 13 (1948) - Pierre Loriot, il cocchiere (segments "Delitto" & "Castigo")
- The Renegade (1948) - Ricardo
- The White Night (1948) - Emile
- The Secret of Monte Cristo (1948) - Jacob Muller
- Passeurs d'or (1948) - Père Maes
- The Woman I Murdered (1948) - René Dufleuve
- La bataille du feu (1949) - Pascla Brignoux
- La maternelle (1949) - Paulin
- Night Round (1949) - Monsieur Labiche
- Millionaires for One Day (1949) - Jules Martin dit "Père Jules", le doyen des François
- La souricière (1950) - Le juge Gravelle
- The Ferret (1950) - Monsieur Thiais
- Death Threat (1950) - Morel
- * Le Grand Cirque (1950) - Le curé
- Plus de vacances pour le Bon Dieu (1950) - Le père Antoine
- One Only Loves Once (1950) - Ravenel
- Old Boys of Saint-Loup (1950) - Monsieur Jacquelin - le directeur du collège
- The Marriage of Mademoiselle Beulemans (1950) - Le curé
- Topaze (1951) - Tamise
- La peau d'un homme (1951) - Frédéric Sabat
- The Beautiful Image (1951) - L'oncle Antonin
- The Passage of Venus (1951) - Virgile Seguin
- Le Dindon (1951) - Géronte
- Mammy (1951) - Dr. André Pierre
- Et ta soeur (1951) - Maître Blaisot
- Monsieur Octave (1951) - Monsieur Octave
- Trois vieilles filles en folie (1952) - Sébastien
- Monsieur Leguignon, Signalman (1952) - M. Petitot
- The Red Head (1952) - Le parrain
- The Nude Dancer (1952) - Charmois
- Crazy for Love (1952) - Testu
- The Priest of Saint-Amour (1952) - Célestin
- Grand Gala (1952) - M. Punch, le clown
- My Husband Is Marvelous (1952) - Le père Henri
- Mandat d'amener (1953)
- The Porter from Maxim's (1953) - Le chanoine Mercey
- Little Jacques (1953)
- Maternité clandestine (1953) - Pépère, le clochard
- The Cucuroux Family (1953) - Jean
- Minuit... Champs-Elysées (1954) - Monsieur Gilbert
- Royal Affairs in Versailles (1954) - Un guide du musée de Versailles
- Tabor (1954) - L'aumônier
- Three Days of Fun in Paris (1954) - Le cultivateur Colladan
- Faites-moi confiance (1954) - Merlin l'Enchanteur
- The Congress of Mother-in-Laws (1954) - Le maire
- Les Diaboliques (1955) - M.Drain, professeur
- Madelon (1955) - Le curé
- Si Paris nous était conté (1956) - Pierre Broussel
- Hello Smile ! (1956) - Lui même lançant le message à la radio (uncredited)
- Lovers and Thieves (1956) - Le maître-nageur
- Ah, quelle équipe! (1957) - Pierre Maurel dit M. Pierre
- The Crucible (1957) - Francis Nurse
- Les Espions (1957) - Le chauffeur de taxi
- Mon coquin de père (1958) - Monsieur Breton
- La p... sentimentale (1958) - Le grand-père
- Ça n'arrive qu'aux vivants (1959) - Le gardien de nuit
- Soupe au lait (1959) - Le pharmacien
- The President (1961) - Augustin
- Par-dessus le mur (1961) - Le trimardeur
- Les bras de la nuit (1961) - Belleau
- La traversée de la Loire (1962)
- Dossier 1413 (1962) - M. Baranger, chimiste biologiste
