= The Bureaucrats (1959 film) =

1959 film

- Directed by: Henri Diamant-Berger
- Written by: Georges Courteline (novel); Henri Diamant-Berger
- Produced by: Henri Diamant-Berger
- Starring: Noël-Noël; Philippe Clay; Jean Richard
- Cinematography: André Germain
- Edited by: Françoise Diot
- Music by: Francis Lopez
- Production company: Cinelor
- Release date: 1 July 1959
- Running time: 85 minutes
- Country: France
- Language: French

The Bureaucrats (French: Messieurs les ronds de cuir) is a 1959 French comedy film directed by Henri Diamant-Berger and starring Noël-Noël, Philippe Clay and Jean Richard. It was shot at the Billancourt Studios in Paris. The film's art direction was by Roger Briaucourt. It is a remake of the 1936 film of the same title, with both based on a novel by Georges Courteline.

== Partial cast ==
- Noël-Noël as M. de la Hourmerie
- Philippe Clay as Letondu
- Jean Richard as Boudin
- Jacques Grello as Chavarax
- Paul Demange as Ovide
- Bernard Lavalette as Van Der Hogen
- Lucien Baroux as Le père Soupe
- Pierre Brasseur as M. Nègre
- Pierre Doris as Léonce
- Jean Poiret as René Lahrier
- Micheline Dax as Gaby
- Mathilde Casadesus as Mme Nègre
- Robert Burnier as Rodolphe Salis
- Madeleine Suffel as Mme de La Hourmerie
- Hubert Deschamps as Le curé dans le train
- Jean Parédès as Gorguchon

== Bibliography ==
- Dayna Oscherwitz & MaryEllen Higgins. The A to Z of French Cinema. Scarecrow Press, 2009.
