= Jacques Fabbri =

French actor

- Born: 4 July 1925; Paris, France
- Died: 24 December 1997 (aged 72); Tourgéville, France
- Occupation: Actor

Jacques Fabbri (French pronunciation: [ʒak fabʁi]; 4 July 1925 – 24 December 1997) was a French actor. He began his acting career in 1949, and acted in about 50 films.

== Selected filmography ==
- Rendezvous in July (1949) - Bernard
- The Girl from Maxim's (1950) - Le duc
- The Seven Deadly Sins (1952) - Julien (segment "Luxure, La / Lust")
- Three Women (1952) - Albert (segment "Mouche")
- Women Are Angels (1952) - Théodore
- My Brother from Senegal (1953) - Le brigadier de gendarmerie
- Daughters of Destiny (1954) - Pierre d'Arc (segment "Jeanne")
- Une vie de garçon (1954) - Octave
- The Unfrocked One (1954) - L'ordonnance
- Crainquebille (1954) - Le clochard distingué
- Les hommes ne pensent qu'à ça (1954) - M. Jacques - le garçon boucher
- Cadet Rousselle (1954) - Le colonel
- Les chiffonniers d'Emmaüs (1955) - Matthieu, le flic
- The Grand Maneuver (1955) - L'ordonnance d'Armand
- Mitsou ou Comment l'esprit vient aux filles... (1956) - Le vaguemestre
- On Foot, on Horse, and on Wheels (1957) - Auguste
- Ce joli monde (1957) - Ravaillac
- Fumée blonde (1957) - Le mari
- Secrets of a French Nurse (1958) - Docteur Carré
- Madame et son auto (1958) - L'aubergiste
- Les naufrageurs (1959) - Le gitan
- Bobosse (1959) - Le radio-reporter
- The Cat Shows Her Claws (1960) - Gustave - le chef du réseau Sud
- Love and the Frenchwoman (1960) - Train conductor (segment "Mariage, Le")
- Le pavé de Paris (1961) - Le père
- Les filles sèment le vent (1961)
- La Belle Américaine (1961) - Le gros / Fatso
- Napoleon II, the Eagle (1961) - Docteur Malfati
- Mon oncle du Texas (1962) - Le patron de l'hôtel de New York
- L'empire de la nuit (1962) - L'acrobate Strom
- Les pieds dans le plâtre (1965) - Achille
- The Lady in the Car with Glasses and a Gun (1970) - Doctor
- Daisy Town (1971) - Le maire (voice)
- The Suspects (1974) - Commissaire Bretonnet
- La Ballade des Dalton (1978) - Thadeus Collins, le directeur de prison (voice)
- I'm Shy, But I'll Heal (1978) - Le routier
- The Lady Banker (1980) - Moïse Nathanson
- Diva (1981) - Commissaire Jean Saporta
- Signé Furax (1981) - Le commissaire en uniforme
- Guy de Maupassant (1982) - Daremberg
- Un matin rouge (1982) - Robert
- Bonjour l'angoisse (1988) - Patron de café 1
- La Femme fardée (1990) - Elledocq
- Croce e delizia (1995) - Germont (final film role)
