= Émile Couzinet =

French film producer and film director

Émile Cousinet
- Born: 12 November 1896; Bourg, Gironde
- Died: 24 October 1964 (aged 67); Bordeaux
- Occupations: film producer and film director

Émile Cousinet (12 November 1896 – 24 October 1964) was a French film producer and film director.

== Biography ==
The son of a carpenter, Couzinet became a traveling projectionist and then director of the Royan Casino.

In the 1920s, he decided to invest in the exploitation of movie theatres, including those of art et essai. In 1930, due to the unbridled competition of the barriers of Bordeaux, he acquired his own studios, the "Studios de la Côte de Beauté", a cinema complex installed in the seaside resort of Royan. After the destruction of the city at the end of World War II, he recreated his studios in Bordeaux, which then took the name Studios de la Côte d'Argent. The infrastructures were developed near the castle Tauzin which became its main residence

He produced himself vaudevilles, of which he was also the screenwriter (occasionally under the name of Robert Eyquem) sometimes at the first degree or a little grivois, often adapted from boulevard theatre. Thus, Trois jours de bringue à Paris is an adaptation of La Cagnotte by Eugène Labiche whereas Le Don d'Adèle is drawn from a play by Pierre Barillet and Jean-Pierre Gredy.

As a representative pillar of popular cinema, he produced jubilant films including Le Club des fadas, Trois Vieilles Filles en folie, The Cucuroux Family, Le Congrès des belles-mères, and also Mon curé champion du régiment. If comedy was his favorite field, Couzinet also touched on other genres such as swashbuckler films (Buridan, héros de la Tour de Nesle), literary adaptation (Colomba after Prosper Mérimée) or family melodrama (Quai des illusions, a film for which he employed a certain Sergio Leone as an assistant.

Well-known actors such as Pierre Larquey, Jeanne Fusier-Gir and Gaby Morlay acted in his films. He also facilitated the beginnings of careers for actors such as Jean Carmet, who appeared in Mon curé champion du régiment and Robert Lamoureux, who held his own role in Le Don d'Adèle.

The Couzinet empire gradually disappeared from the late 1950s in the context of concentration of the film industry.

== Filmography ==
- 1939: L'Intrigante
- 1939: Le Club des fadas
- 1942: Andorra ou les hommes d'airain
- 1943: Le Brigand gentilhomme
- 1947: Hyménée
- 1948: Colomba
- 1949: Le Bout de la route
- 1950: A Hole in the Wall
- 1950: Three Sailors in a Convent
- 1951: Adele's Gift
- 1951: That Rascal Anatole
- 1951: Buridan, héros de la Tour de Nesle
- 1952: Trois Vieilles Filles en folie
- 1952: When Do You Commit Suicide?
- 1952: The Priest of Saint-Amour
- 1953: The Cucuroux Family
- 1954: The Congress of Mother-in-Laws
- 1954: Three Days of Fun in Paris
- 1956: Mon curé champion du régiment
- 1957: Trois marins en bordée
- 1959: Quay of Illusions
- 1962: Césarin joue les étroits mousquetaires

== Bibliography ==
- Mamolar, Françoise (June 2008). Citizen Couzinet, Hollywood-sur-Gironde (in French). Vaux-sur-Mer: Éditions Bonne-Anse. p. 120. ISBN 978-2-916470-03-0.
