= Georges Courteline =

French dramatist and novelist (1858–1929)

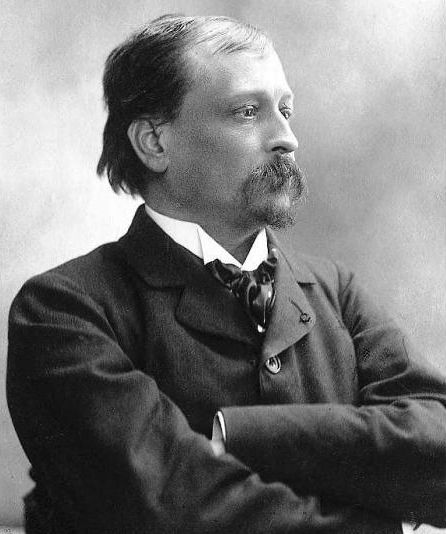
Georges Courteline (c.1890)

Georges Courteline (French pronunciation: [ʒɔʁʒ kuʁtəlin]) born Georges Victor Marcel Moinaux ([ʒɔʁʒ viktɔʁ maʁsɛl mwano]; 25 June 1858 – 25 June 1929) was a French dramatist and novelist, a satirist notable for his sharp wit and cynical humor.

== Biography ==
His family moved from Tours in Indre-et-Loire to Paris shortly after his birth. During the time of the Paris Commune, at age 13, he was sent to school in Meaux and after graduation in 1876, he went on to serve in the French military before taking a job as a civil servant. Interested in poetry and authorship, he became involved in writing poetry reviews and was part of a small newspaper. By the 1890s, he had begun writing plays under the name Courteline for the theatres of Montmartre where he lived.

Gifted with a quick wit, he became a leading dramatist, producing many plays as well as a number of novels. The overall tone of his works was satirical in nature, often making fun of everything from the wealthy elitists of Paris to the bloated government bureaucracies. In 1899, Courteline was awarded the Legion of Honour and in 1926 was elected to the Académie Goncourt.

In 1929, Courteline died on his 71st birthday in Paris and was interred in the Père Lachaise Cemetery. Rue de Lariche, the street in the city of Tours where he was born, was renamed in his honour.

== Selected works ==
- Les Gaités de l'escadron (1886) - a novel, subsequently dramatized for the theatre in 1895.
- Le 51e Chasseurs (1887) – a novel.
- Les Femmes d'amis (1888) – a novel.
- Le Train de 8 heures 47 (1888) – a novel.
- Madelon, Margot et Cie (1890).
- Potiron (1890) - recit.
- Messieurs les ronds-de-cuir (1893) – a novel.
- Boubouroche (1893) – a theatrical play in two acts.
- Ah! Jeunesse! (1894) – a novel.
- Ombres Parisiennes (1894) – recits.
- La Peur des coups (1895) – theatre in one act.
- Les Gaitiės de l'escadron (1895) - theatre in nine scenes.
- La vie de caserne (1895)
- Un client sérieux (1896) - theatre in one act.
- Le Droit aux étrennes (1896) - theatre in five scenes.
- Hortense, couche-toi! (1897) – theatre in one act.
- Monsieur Badin (1897) – theatre in one act.
- L'Extra-Lucide (1897) - theatre in one act.
- Une lettre chargée (1897) – theatre in one act.
- Théodore cherche des allumettes (1897) - theatre in one act.
- Godefroy (1897) - theatre in one act.
- La Voiture versée (1897) – theatre in one act.
- Gros Chagrins (1897) – theatre in one act.
- Les Boulingrin (1898) – theatre in one act.
- Le gendarme est sans pitié (1899) – theatre in one act.
- Le commissaire est bon enfant (1900) – theatre in one act.
- L'Article 330 (1900) - theatre in one act.
- Les Marionnettes de la vie (1900)
- Sigismond (1901) - theatre, a fantasy in one act with choir.
- Les Balances (1901) – theatre in one act.
- La Paix chez soi (1903) - theatre in one act.
- L'Illustre Piégelé (1904).
- L'Ami des Lois (1904) - three short plays.
- Facéties de Jean de La Butte (1904).
- Les tire-au-cul : les gaîtés de l'escadron (1904).
- Coco, Coco et Toto (1905).
- La Conversion d'Alceste (1905) – theatre in verse in one act.
- Le Petit Malade 1905
- Le père Machin-Chouette : les gaîtés de l'escadron (1905)
- Les Fourneaux (1905)
- La Cruche (1909) - theatre in two acts.
- Un visiteur sans gêne (1911)
- Les Linottes (1912) – a novel.
- Le Gora (1920)

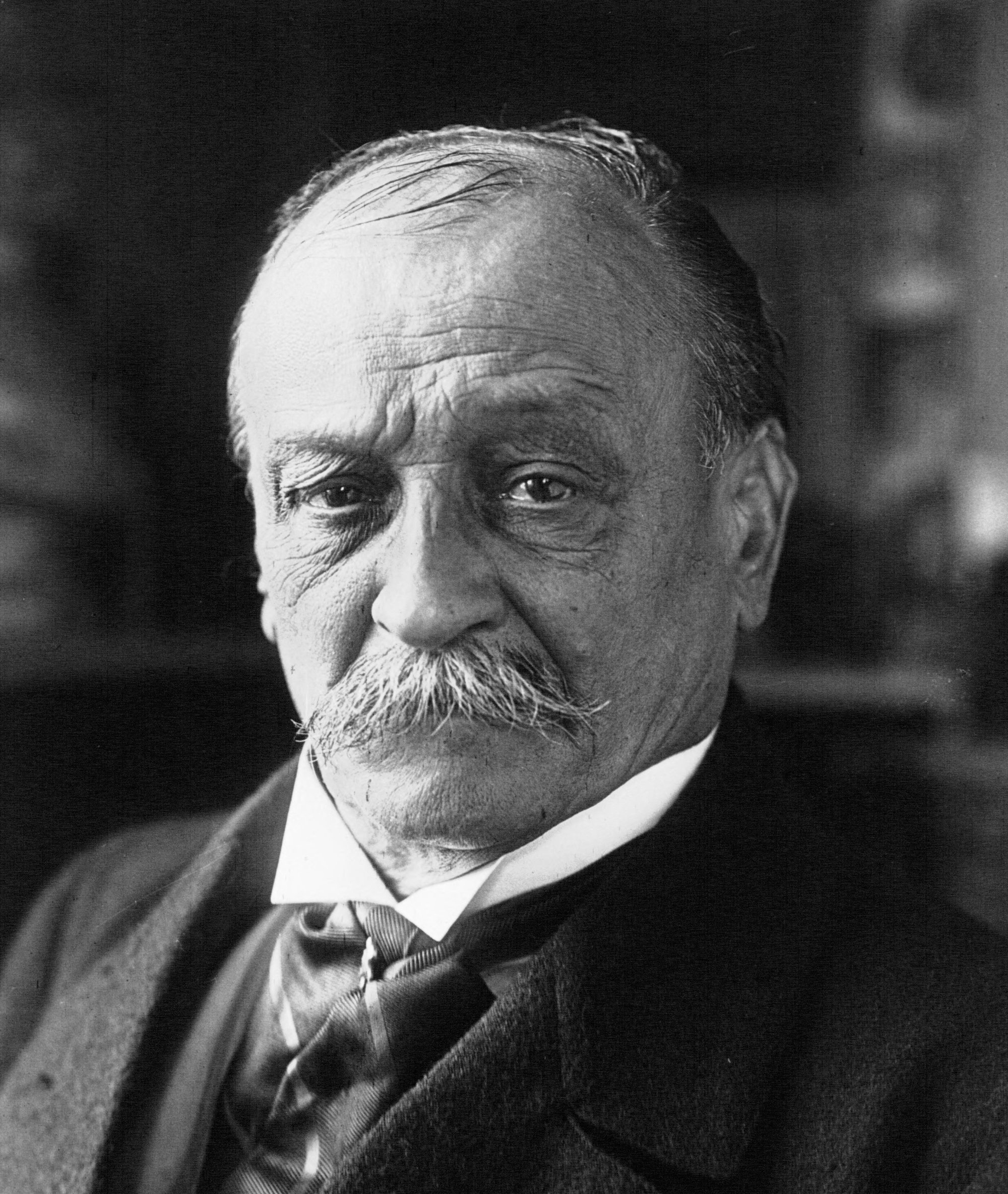
Courteline in 1921

== Filmography ==
- The Gaieties of the Squadron, directed by Maurice Tourneur and Joseph Faivre (1913, based on the play Les Gaîtés de l'escadron)
- Théodore cherche des allumettes, directed by Andrew Brunelle (1923, based on the play Théodore cherche des allumettes)
- Le Train de 8h47, directed by Georges Pallu (1927, based on the novel Le Train de 8 heures 47)
- Fun in the Barracks, directed by Maurice Tourneur (1932, based on the play Les Gaîtés de l'escadron)
- Boubouroche, directed by André Hugon (1933, based on the play Boubouroche)
- Le Train de 8 heures 47, directed by Henry Wulschleger (1934, based on the novel Le Train de 8 heures 47)
- The Bureaucrats, directed by Yves Mirande (1936, based on the novel Messieurs les ronds-de-cuir)
- The Cheerful Squadron, directed by Paolo Moffa (1954, based on the play Les Gaîtés de l'escadron)
- Scènes de ménage, directed by André Berthomieu (1954, based on the plays La Peur des coups, La Paix chez soi and Les Boulingrin)
- The Bureaucrats, directed by Henri Diamant-Berger (1959, based on the novel Messieurs les ronds-de-cuir)
