= Marcel Aboulker =

French Algerian screenwriter and film director

Marcel Aboulker (1 January 1905 in Algiers – 7 September 1952 in Garches) was a French screenwriter and film director. Aboulker built up a successful career from the late 1940s directing comedy films before his death from illness at the age of 47.

== Selected filmography ==
- Radio Surprises (1940)
- Les Aventures des Pieds-Nickelés (1948)
- Le trésor des Pieds-Nickelés (1950)
- The Girl from Maxim's (1950)
- Women Are Angels (1952)

== Bibliography ==
- Oscherwitz, Dayna & Higgins, MaryEllen. The A to Z of French Cinema. Scarecrow Press, 2009.
