= Jean Laviron =

French film director and screenwriter

Jean Laviron (26 April 1915, in Paris – 15 February 1987, in Fresneaux-Montchevreuil) was a French film director and screenwriter.

== Filmography ==
=== Director ===
- 1951 : Un amour de parapluie
- 1951 : Come Down, Someone Wants You
- 1953 : Au diable la vertu
- 1953 : Légère et court vêtue
- 1954 : Soirs de Paris
- 1954 : Yours Truly, Blake
- 1959 : Les Motards
- 1960 : Les Héritiers
- 1962 : L'inspecteur Leclerc enquête (2 episodes)
- 1965 : Mon filleul et moi
- 1967 : Les créatures du bon Dieu
- 1970 : Ça vous arrivera demain
- 1975 : Erreurs judiciaires, TV serial
- 1978 : Preuve à l'appui (TV serial)
- 1979 : Par-devant notaire

=== Screenwriter ===
- 1950 : Les Derniers jours de Pompéi by Marcel L'Herbier
- 1951 : Descendez, on vous demande
- 1953 : Au diable la vertu
- 1953 : Légère et court vêtue
- 1954 : Soirs de Paris
- 1959 : Les Motards
- 1960 : Les Héritiers
- 1965 : Mon filleul et moi
- 1979 : Par-devant notaire

=== Assistant director ===
- 1951 : Rome-Paris-Rome (Signori, in carrozza !) by Luigi Zampa
- 1946 : The Queen's Necklace by Marcel L'Herbier
- 1946 : Happy Go Lucky by Marcel L'Herbier
- 1945 : La vie de bohème by Marcel L'Herbier
- 1943 : L'Honorable Catherine by Marcel L'Herbier
- 1942 : La Nuit fantastique by Marcel L'Herbier

=== External links ===
Jean Laviron at IMDb
