= Claude Autant-Lara filmography =

Films by the French filmmaker Claude Autant-Lara

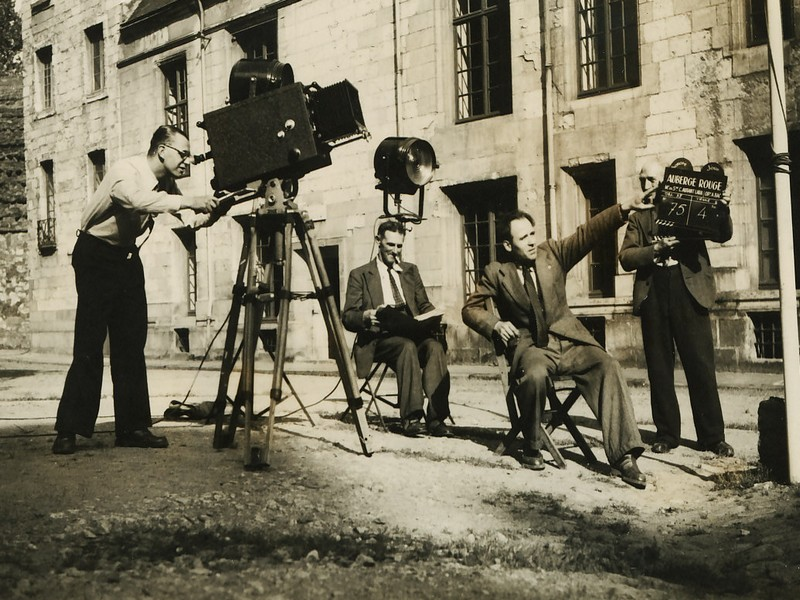
Claude Autant-Lara, second from the right, during the filming of The Red Inn (1951)

Claude Autant-Lara (5 August 1901 – 5 February 2000) was a French film director, screenwriter and set designer. His career in cinema began as an art director and costume designer in 1919 and spanned for more than 50 years. He frequently adapted literary works and made films characterised by anticlerical themes, sexual frankness and bourgeois realism.

== Filmography as director ==
Claude Autant-Lara directed the following films.

- 1923: Fait Divers (short film)
- 1925: Construire un feu (short film after "To Build a Fire" by Jack London)
- 1926: Vittel (short film)
- 1929: Boul se met au verre... (short film)
- 1931: Buster se marie (French version of the Buster Keaton film Parlor, Bedroom and Bath) [co-directed with Edward Brophy]
- 1932: La Dame d'en face (short film)
- 1932: Le Gendarme est sans pitié (short film)
- 1932: Invite Monsieur à dîner (short film)
- 1932: Monsieur le duc (short film)
- 1932: La Peur des coups (short film)
- 1932: Un client sérieux (short film)
- 1932: Le Plombier amoureux (French version of The Passionate Plumber with Buster Keaton)
- 1932: L'Athlète incomplet (French version of Local Boy Makes Good)
- 1933: Ciboulette; (film version of the operetta Ciboulette)
- 1937: L'Affaire du courrier de Lyon (The Courier of Lyon) [co-directed with Maurice Lehmann]
- 1938: Le Ruisseau (The Gutter) [co-directed with Maurice Lehmann]
- 1939: Fric-Frac [co-directed with Maurice Lehmann]
- 1939: The Mysterious Mr. Davis [in English]
- 1942: Le Mariage de Chiffon (Chiffon's Wedding)
- 1942: Lettres d'amour (Love Letters)
- 1943: Douce (Love Story)
- 1946: Sylvie et le Fantôme (Sylvie and the Ghost)
- 1947: Le Diable au corps (Devil in the Flesh)
- 1949: Occupe-toi d'Amélie (Keep an Eye on Amelia)
- 1951: L'Auberge rouge (The Red Inn) [also screenwriter]; remade in 2007
- 1952: Les Sept Péchés capitaux (The Seven Deadly Sins; segment "L'Orgueil/Pride") [also screenwriter]
- 1953: Le Bon Dieu sans confession (Good Lord Without Confession) [also screenwriter]
- 1954: Le Blé en herbe (The Game of Love)
- 1954: Le Rouge et le Noir (The Red and the Black )
- 1955: Marguerite de la nuit (Marguerite of the Night)
- 1956: La Famille Anodin (The Anodin Family) (TV serial)
- 1956: La Traversée de Paris (Four Bags Full)
- 1958: Le Joueur (The Gambler)
- 1959: En cas de malheur (In Case of Adversity / Love Is My Profession)
- 1959: La Jument verte (The Green Mare)
- 1960: Les Régates de San Francisco (The Regattas of San Francisco)
- 1960: Le Bois des amants (Between Love and Duty)
- 1961: Tu ne tueras point (Thou Shalt Not Kill)
- 1961: Le Comte de Monte-Cristo (The Story of the Count of Monte Cristo)
- 1961: Vive Henri IV... vive l'amour! (Long Live Henry IV... Long Live Love!)
- 1963: Le Meurtrier (Enough Rope)
- 1963: Le Magot de Josefa (Josefa's Loot)
- 1965: Humour noir (Black Humor; segment "La Bestiole")
- 1965: Journal d'une femme en blanc (A Woman in White)
- 1966: Une femme en blanc se révolte / Nouveau journal d'une femme en blanc
- 1967: Le Plus Vieux Métier du monde (The Oldest Profession; segment "Aujourd'hui")
- 1968: Le Franciscain de Bourges (Franciscan of Bourges)
- 1969: Les Patates
- 1973–1974: Lucien Leuwen (TV mini-series based on the novel by Stendhal)
- 1977: Gloria
