= The Red Inn =

1951 film

- Theatrical release poster
- Directed by: Claude Autant-Lara
- Written by: Jean Aurenche; Pierre Bost; Claude Autant-Lara
- Produced by: Simon Schiffrin
- Starring: Fernandel; Françoise Rosay; Julien Carette
- Cinematography: André Bac
- Edited by: Madeleine Gug
- Music by: René Cloërec
- Production company: Memnon Films
- Distributed by: Cocinor
- Release date: 19 October 1951
- Running time: 95 minutes
- Country: France
- Language: French

The Red Inn (French: L'auberge rouge) is a 1951 French comedy crime film directed by Claude Autant-Lara and starring Fernandel, Françoise Rosay and Julien Carette. It premiered on 19 October 1951. A remake of the film, directed by Gérard Krawczyk, premiered in 2007.

== Plot ==
Set in 1833, it tells the story of how a monk visits the inn l'Auberge rouge in Peyrebeille, where the innkeeper confesses to a number of serious sins. The film is based on the actual crime case of the Peyrebeille Inn.

== Production ==
The film was originally supposed to be an adaptation of Honoré de Balzac's 1831 short story The Red Inn ("L'auberge rouge"), as part of the commemoration to mark a hundred years since Balzac's death. When the financing encountered problems and took longer than expected, the filmmakers decided to keep the title, but change the project into a treatment of the events of the Auberge rouge in Peyrebeille, which are unrelated to Balzac's story.

The story had been filmed twice before, as a 1910 French silent film adapted by Abel Gance, and later as a 1923 film directed by Jean Epstein, with both of those earlier versions sticking much closer to the original story.

It was shot at the Billancourt Studios in Paris. The film's sets were designed by the art director Max Douy.

== Cast ==
- Fernandel as the monk
- Françoise Rosay as Marie Martin
- Marie-Claire Olivia as Mathilde
- Jean-Roger Caussimon as Dauvin
- Nane Germon as Elisa
- Jacques Charon as Rodolphe
- Julien Carette as Pierre Martin
- Grégoire Aslan as Barbeuf
- Andrée Viala as La Marquise De La Roche de Glun
- Didier D'yd as Janou
- Lud Germain as Fétiche
- Robert Berri as Le Cocher
- André Cheff as Le dandy
- André Dalibert as le bûcheron
- Manuel Gary as Un gendarme
- René Lefevre-Bel as Un gendarme

== Bibliography ==
- Leahy, Sarah & Vanderschelden, Isabelle. Screenwriters in French cinema. Manchester University Press, 2021.
