= The Phantom Baron =

1943 film

- Directed by: Serge de Poligny
- Written by: Serge de Poligny; Louis Chavance; Jean Cocteau
- Produced by: Aimé Frapin; Jean Séfert
- Starring: Odette Joyeux; Jany Holt; Alain Cuny
- Cinematography: Roger Hubert
- Edited by: Jean Feyte
- Music by: Louis Beydts
- Production company: Consortium de Productions de Films
- Distributed by: Consortium du Film
- Release date: 16 June 1943
- Running time: 99 minutes
- Country: France
- Language: French

The Phantom Baron (French: Le Baron fantôme) is a 1943 French drama film directed by Serge de Poligny and starring Odette Joyeux, Jany Holt, and Alain Cuny. It was made during the German occupation of France, and it was an example of the fantastique genre in film which was among those less likely to face difficulties with the censorship of the time.

== Plot ==
In 1826 the Countess of Saint-Hélié arrives from Paris, with her daughter Elfy and her adopted daughter Anne, at an old castle in south-west France where she intends to live with her uncle, the aged Baron Carol. His servant Toussaint tells her that the Baron has mysteriously disappeared and is a "ghost"; the countess moves into the habitable part of the house anyway. Ten years later Baron Carol has never returned, and Elfy and Anne have grown into beautiful young women. Hervé, Toussaint's nephew, who has been their childhood playmate, now lives in the game-keeper's house.

The countess wants to marry her daughter to Albéric de Marignac, a young cavalry officer, but Elfy has no dowry and his colonel opposes their marriage. Albéric seeks support from "Monseigneur", a man who pretends to be Louis XVII, escaped from the Temple prison and living anonymously in the locality. However both Elfy and Anne are secretly in love with Hervé; and Anne believes that Hervé loves Elfy.

On the eve of her engagement to Albéric, Elfy disappears and everyone joins a search of the castle. The old baron's black cat guides Anne and Hervé to a dungeon into which Elfy has fallen and fainted. Anne privately discovers a secret room nearby which contains Baron Carol's treasures, and also his mummified body which crumbles to dust when she screams. She finds the baron's testament which declares Hervé to be his son and heir. Anne keeps the document to herself.

Elfy announces that she wants to marry Hervé, angering her mother. One night, Hervé, who is prone to sleepwalking, comes to Anne's room and carries her through the castle and grounds, demonstrating that he was in love with her without acknowledging it. Anne reveals the contents of the baron's will and Hervé's fortune. Rivalries and misunderstandings lead Albéric to challenge Hervé to a duel, during which a stray shot wounds Monseigneur, who is then revealed to be a poacher called Eustache Dauphin. Elfy is reconciled to Albéric, and Anne and Hervé are united. Eustache Dauphin is appointed game-keeper to the castle.

== Cast ==
- André Lefaur as Eustache Dauphin, known as Monseigneur - the fake Louis XVII
- Odette Joyeux as Elfy de Saint-Hélié
- Jany Holt as Anne
- Alain Cuny as Hervé
- Gabrielle Dorziat as the Comtesse de Saint-Hélié
- André Alerme as the Colonel
- Aimé Clariond as the Bishop
- Marguerite Pierry as Fébronie Dauphin
- Claude Sainval as Albéric de Marignac
- Charles Vissière as Toussaint, the baron's servant
- Jean Cocteau as the Baron Julius Carol, the phantom baron
- Marguerite de Morlaye as an old lady
- Marcel Pérès as Léopold, Fébronie's brother
- Jean Diéner - as Joseph, the coachman
- Jacques Ory as the young Hervé
- Marie Magali as the young Elfy de Saint-Hélié
- Mercédès Brare as the young Anne

== Production ==
Serge de Poligny described the origins of the film in an interview at the time of its release. He explained that the starting point was a romantic idea discovered in an old magic book (a young girl on her engagement day falls into a dungeon and finds a treasure) which he then elaborated with the addition of a story about one of the false claimants to the French throne who proliferated in the years following the execution of Louis XVI. He then spent months cycling around to find suitably picturesque locations, and selected the Château de Rauzan in Gironde and the Château de Pontarmé in l'Oise. Only after establishing the spirit and mood of the production did he allow himself to consider the technical aspects of filming it

The screenplay was written by Louis Chavance in collaboration with Serge de Poligny, and Jean Cocteau wrote the dialogue. The film's art direction was by Jacques Krauss and the costumes were designed by Christian Dior. Apart from the location filming at Rauzan and Pontarmé, the interiors for the film were shot at the Saint-Maurice Studios in Paris.

== Reception ==
The film was praised for its "unusual and poetic climate" and for the intelligence and subtlety of its direction. This film along with La Fiancée des ténèbres (1945) have been judged to be the best in the career of Serge de Poligny, sharing their sense of a mysterious and captivating atmosphere.
