= Lunegarde (film) =

1946 French film by Marc Allégret

- Directed by: Marc Allégret
- Written by: Pierre Benoît (novel); Marcel Achard; Jacques Viot
- Produced by: Josette France; Pierre Gurgo-Salice; Adrien Remaugé
- Starring: Gaby Morlay; Jean Tissier; Saturnin Fabre
- Cinematography: Jules Kruger
- Edited by: Yvonne Martin
- Music by: Pierre Sancan
- Production company: Lux Compagnie Cinématographique de France
- Distributed by: Pathé Consortium Cinéma
- Release date: 16 January 1946
- Running time: 90 minutes
- Country: France
- Language: French

Lunegrade is a 1946 French drama film directed by Marc Allégret starring Gaby Morlay, Jean Tissier and Saturnin Fabre. It is based on a novel by Pierre Benoit. It was shot in 1944 but had a delayed release. It recorded admissions in France of 1,587,359.

The film's sets were designed by the art directors Paul Bertrand and Lucien Carré.

== Cast ==
- Gaby Morlay as Armance de Lunegarde
- Gisèle Pascal as Elisabeth de Lunegarde
- Jean Tissier as Bob
- Saturnin Fabre as M. de Vertumne
- Gérard Landry as Georges Costes
- Lise Delamare as Mme de Vertumne
- Renée Devillers as la supérieure
- Lucien Nat as M. de Lunegarde
- Colette Richard as Mlle de Vertumne
- Dany Robin as Martine
- Joëlle Bernard
- Mercédès Brare
- José Davilla
- Danièle Delorme
- Jacques Dynam
- Gabrielle Fontan
- Marcel Pérès
- Jean-Jacques Rouff
- Odette Talazac

== Bibliography ==
- Goble, Alan. The Complete Index to Literary Sources in Film. Walter de Gruyter, 1999.
