= Philippe Agostini =

French cinematographer, director, and screenwriter (1910–2001)

- Born: 11 August 1910; Paris, France
- Died: 20 October 2002 (aged 92)
- Occupations: Cinematographer, film director, screenwriter

Philippe Agostini (11 August 1910-20 October 2002) was a French cinematographer, director and screenwriter

== Biography ==
Agostini was born 11 August 1910 in Paris (France) and died 20 October 2001. He was married to actress and playwright Odette Joyeux until the end of her life.

He was the founder of École Louis-Lumière (situated on rue de Vaugirard), Philippe Agostini debuted as assistant to the chief operators Georges Périnal and Armand Thirard. In the 1930s, he began a fruitful career as director of photography, working with directors with such differing styles as Robert Bresson, Marcel Carné, Max Ophüls, Claude Autant-Lara, Jean Grémillon, Yves Allégret, Jules Dassin and even Julien Duvivier. His career as a director was much less remarkable.

== Filmography ==
=== As cinematographer ===
- 1934 : Itto
- 1936 : Forty Little Mothers
- 1936 : Hélène
- 1936 : Aventure à Paris
- 1936 : À nous deux, madame la vie
- 1936 : Baccara
- 1937 : Hercule
- 1937 : Life Dances On
- 1938 : I Was an Adventuress
- 1938 : Rasputin (La Tragédie impériale)
- 1938 : Storm Over Asia
- 1938 : Le Ruisseau
- 1939 :The Fatted Calf
- 1939 : Le Jour se lève
- 1940 : Thunder Over Paris
- 1942 : Chiffon's Wedding
- 1942 : Love Letters
- 1943 : Les Deux timides
- 1943 : White Wings
- 1943 : Monsieur des Lourdines
- 1943 : Les Anges du péché
- 1943 : Douce
- 1944 : First on the Rope
- 1945 : Enquête du 58
- 1945 : Les dames du Bois de Boulogne
- 1946 :Sylvie and the Ghost
- 1946 : Lessons in Conduct
- 1946 : Les Portes de la nuit
- 1948 : The Last Vacation
- 1949 : White Paws
- 1949 : Monseigneur
- 1950 : lt=Julie de Carneilhan
- 1950 : L'Inconnue de Montréal
- 1951 : Topaze
- 1951 : Gigolo
- 1951 : La Peau d'un homme
- 1951 : The Night Is My Kingdom
- 1952 : Le Plaisir
- 1953 : Une fille dans le soleil
- 1953 : Their Last Night
- 1953 : The Lady of the Camellias
- 1953 : The Beauty of Cadiz
- 1954 : Châteaux en Espagne (El Torero)
- 1955 : Il Padrone sono me...
- 1955 : Du rififi chez les hommes
- 1956 : Si Paris nous était conté
- 1956 : Le Monde du silence
- 1956 : Le Pays d'où je viens
- 1956 : Paris, Palace Hotel
- 1957 : Les Trois font la paire
- 1957 : Le Corbusier, l'architecte du bonheur
- 1964 : Le Vrai visage de Thérèse de Lisieux

=== As director ===
- 1957 : The Innocent with Forty Children
- 1960 : Tu es Pierre
- 1960 : Dialogue of the Carmelites
- 1962 : Rencontres
- 1963 : La Soupe aux poulets
- 1964 : Le Vrai visage de Thérèse de Lisieux
- 1966 : L'Âge heureux (TV)
- 1967 : La Bonne peinture (TV)
- 1969 : Le Trésor des Hollandais (TV)
- 1971 : La Petite fille à la recherche du printemps
- 1975 : L'Âge en fleur (TV)

=== As screenwriter ===
- 1956 : The Bride Is Much Too Beautiful
- 1958 : Le Naïf aux quarante enfants
- 1960 : Le Dialogue des Carmélites
- 1962 : Rencontres
- 1964 : Le Vrai visage de Thérèse de Lisieux
- 1967 : La Bonne peinture (TV)
- 1975 : L'Âge en fleur (série TV)
- 1984 : Le Dialogue des Carmélites (TV)
