= Rencontres =

- Directed by: Philippe Agostini
- Written by: Philippe Agostini; Odette Joyeux; Bertram L. Lonsdale
- Starring: Michèle Morgan
- Cinematography: Jacques Lemare; Jacques Robin
- Music by: Marcel Stern
- Release date: 16 February 1962
- Running time: 95 min
- Countries: Italy; France
- Language: French

Rencontres (English title: Meetings) is a 1962 French language motion picture drama directed by Philippe Agostini who co-wrote screenplay with Odette Joyeux and Bertram L. Lonsdale.

== Synopsis ==
The film depicts the holiday love affair in which a woman has a disabled brother.

== Cast ==
- Michèle Morgan as Bella Krasner
- Gabriele Ferzetti as Ralph Scaffari
- Pierre Brasseur as Carl Krasner
- Diana Gregor as Laurence Krasner
- Jacques Morel as David
- Nico Pepe as José
- Véronique Vendell as Micky
