= L'Auberge rouge =

The Red Inn
- L'Auberge rouge
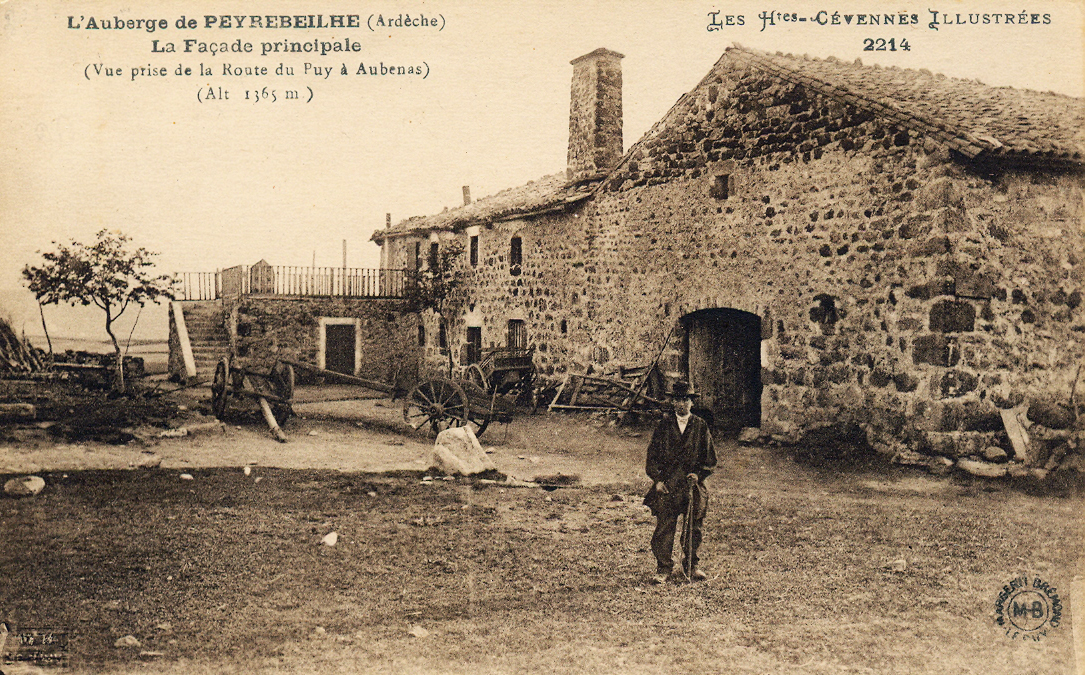
- Old postcard of L'Auberge de Peyrebeille, commonly called L'Auberge Rouge (The Red Inn)
- Interactive map of the The Red Inn area
- Former names: L'Auberge de Peyrebeille

General information
- Location: Lanarce, Ardèche, France
- Coordinates: 44.7550°N 3.9731°E

L'Auberge rouge (The Red Inn) is an inn, originally named L'Auberge de Peyrebeille ("the Inn of Peyrebeille"), in the commune of Lanarce in Ardèche, bordering Issanlas and Lavillatte. In the 19th century, it was the site of a notorious French criminal scandal known as "the Red Inn affair." In 1831, after a customer, Jean-Antoine Enjolras, was found dead by a nearby river with his skull smashed in, the owners of the inn, Pierre and Marie Martin, and their employee, Jean Rochette, were arrested and eventually charged with his murder. During the subsequent trial, numerous witnesses testified to other crimes committed by the accused, including up to fifty murders at the inn, and to aggravating circumstances of rape and cannibalism. There were rumours that the owners used to serve their intended victims meals containing cooked body parts of previous victims. The accused were only convicted of the murder of Enjolras, and were sentenced to death. They were executed by guillotine in front of the inn, with a crowd of 30,000 on-lookers.

Subsequent scholars have raised doubts about the integrity of the trial. Today, the inn is a tourist attraction.

== History ==
For about 23 years (approximately 1805–1830), Pierre and Marie Martin (née Breysee), kept the inn. Originally poor farmers, they were said to have accumulated a fortune of 30,000 gold Francs (approximately 600,000 Euros in today's currency) by the time of their deaths. Pierre Martin was feared by his neighbours as he was a grasping, paid henchman of the local nobility, and had a forceful personality. The Martins were ultra-royalists; he had assisted nobles returning from exile to recover their land from the farmers on the cheap, and she had hidden a refractory priest. The political climate in France changed in 1830 with the overthrow of the ultra-royalist Charles X and his replacement by Louis Philippe: the Martins were no longer useful supporters of the regime but rather of its opponents.

The peasantry of the Ardèche were accustomed to collecting wood in the royal forests, but this had been curbed to protect the interests of sawmills. Sawmills began to be set on fire at night by bands of men who knew the terrain and had no difficulty in putting the gendarmerie to flight. Worried by this, the prefect had ordered that the rule of law must be restored.

In October 1831, a local horse-dealer, (Note: Presumably, though the French Wikipedia states that maquignon could by extension also mean a "shady character" with no actual connection with livestock, similarly to cowboy in English.) Antoine (Jean-Antoine) Enjolras (or Anjolras), went missing; a justice de paix (local magistrate), Étienne Filiat-Duclaux, (Note: A justice de paix was a non-lawyer with much the same civil powers as an English Justice of the Peace, but additionally acting as a police magistrate directing initial investigations. Once serious crime was suspected and suspects identified the case would pass to a professional magistrate (the juge d'instruction) who would take more evidence and work up the case until he was satisfied it was strong enough to go to a jury trial.) determined that Enjolras had visited the inn on 12 October 1831, whilst looking for a lost heifer and had not been seen since. On 25 October, the magistrate arrived at the Martins' to investigate the disappearance of Enjolras, whose body was found the next day on the banks of the Allier a few kilometres from the inn, his skull smashed and his knee crushed. Pierre Martin and his nephew André Martin were arrested on 1 November 1831. The Martins' servant, Jean Rochette (nicknamed "Fetiche" (Note: Literally 'Fetish' but also simply and more plausibly 'Lucky'.)) – incorrectly described in romantic literature as a South American mulatto, but actually a (well-tanned) native of the Ardèche – was arrested the next day. Marie Martin was not arrested until later because the authorities did not believe at first that a woman could be a murderer.

On 18 June 1833, the trial of the "four monsters" began at the court of Ardeche in Privas. The accused were linked to the death of Enjolras by the testimony of Claude Pagès, who said that Pierre Martin, Rochette, and a stranger had used a cart to move the body from the inn to the river. A local beggar, Laurent Chaze, testified in 'patois'; (Note: In this case one of the Vivarois dialects of Occitan. In 1807 most Frenchmen spoke their local patois rather than textbook French; to help size up the problem, the prefect of every department in France was ordered to send in the parable of the prodigal son in the local patois; in the version of Vivarois it begins: Un òme aviá mas dos garçons; lo plus joeine diguèt a son paire: ei temps que sicho mon mèstre e qu’aio d’argent; chal que pòscho m’en anar e que veso de país. Partajatz vòstre bien e bailatz-me çò que deve avèr. Mon enfant diguèt lo paire, coma vodràs, siás un meschant e seràs punit. E puèi badèt un tirant, partagèt son ben e ne faguèt doas parts. Quauques jorns après lo meschant se n’anèt dau vilatge en fasent lo fièr e sens dire adieu a dengús. Traversèt biaucòp de champèstres, de bòscs, de rius e arribèt en una bèla vila ont despensèt tot son argent; quauques mes après, deupoguèt vendre sos abits aub una velha femna e prenguèt una plaça de valet. Lo manderan per los prats per sonhar los asnes et los bueus. Adoncas seguèt bien malaürós. Aguèt ges de lèit per dermir la nuèit, ni de fuòc per se chaufar quand aiá freid. De fei que i’a, aiá ben tant fam qu’auriá ben manjat aquelas fuèlhas de chaul e aquela fruta puriá que manjan los caions. Mas dengús li bailava ren; un sera, lo ventre voide se laissèt tombar sus un sochon, e sonhèt per la fenèstra los augiaus que volavan leugeirament. Puèis veguèt paréisser au cial la luna e las estialas e çò diguèt en plorant : aval, la maison de mon paire ei plena de valets qu’an de pan e de vin e d’uèus e de fromatge tant que ne vòlon; pendent quel temps ieu muere de fam aicí.) his testimony, as translated into French, was that on the night in question – unable to pay for a bed – he had been thrown out of the inn. He had hidden in a shed only to find himself witnessing the murder of a solitary traveller, Enjolras.

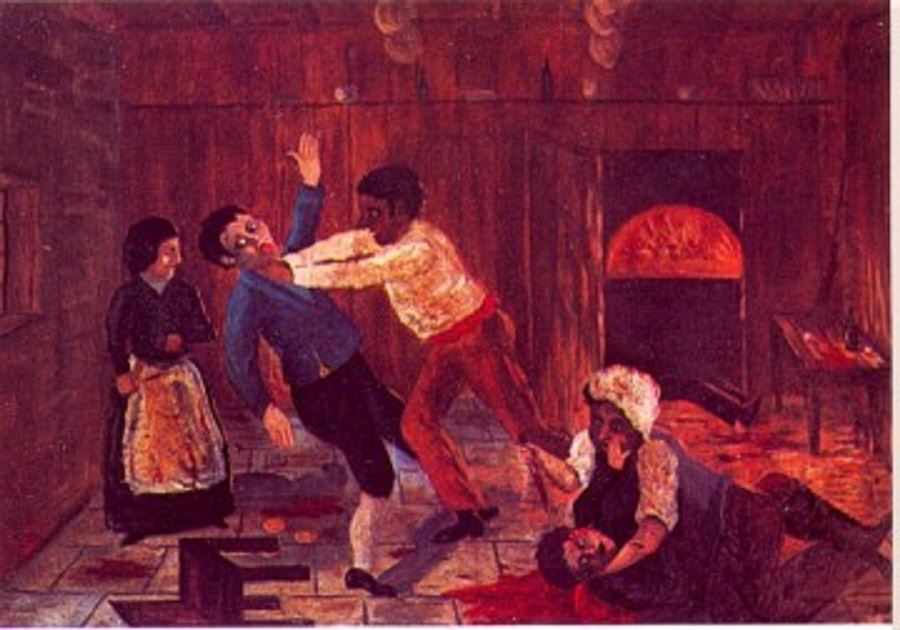
"Meurtres en série à l'Auberge Rouge" – author unknown

=== Alleged serial killings ===
More than 100 other witnesses were called to testify, mainly indirect witnesses relaying rumors of the time. The Code Napoleon permitted hearsay evidence to a much greater extent than Anglo-Saxon common law, but even so much of the evidence given was clearly inadmissible. Claims included:

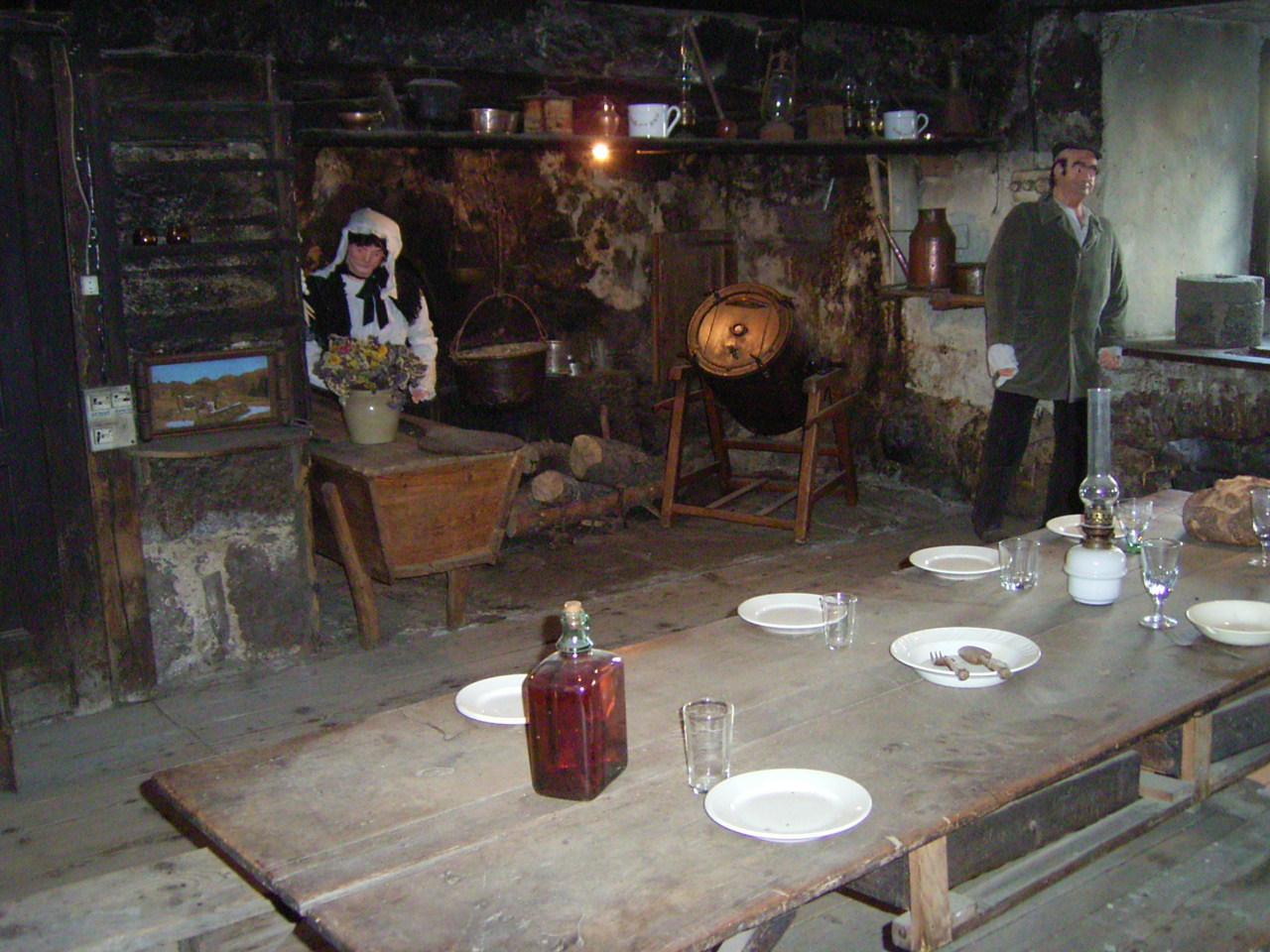
The interior of the Red Inn, now a museum

- The landlady would use the best bits of the corpses to make pâtés and stews for customers to eat
- Certain farmers had seen human hands simmering in the cooking pot
- Others reported having seen bed sheets or walls stained with blood
- Others recounted that sickening smoke frequently came from the chimneys
- The innkeepers would burn the corpses of their victims, including children, in the bread oven or pretend they were found dead from cold on the snow of the plateau

Jean Rochette's lawyer implicitly accepted that his client was a murderer, pleading that Rochette was not responsible for the murders because he had been unable to break free of the influence of his masters. This plea contributed to the fate of the accused. Some historians think that the culpability of the Martins in the "assassination" of Enjolras is far from being proven, arguing that the latter simply died of a heart attack after having too much to drink, and that this would explain why Marie Martin tried to make him drink herbal tea. The summing-up of the president of the court was effectively a second closing speech for the prosecution; the argument of the defence, that Chaze was a drunken down-and-out whose testimony was implausible, was ignored.

=== Verdict and execution ===
On 29 June, after a hearing lasting seven days, André Martin was acquitted; Pierre Martin, Marie Martin and Rochette were found guilty of only one murder, that of Enjolras, and were sentenced to death. After the rejection of their appeal, and of a plea for clemency to King Louis Philippe, they were returned to the scene of their crime in order to be guillotined in front of their inn by the executioner Pierre Roch and his nephew Nicolas. The execution took place on 2 October 1833, at noon as the bell of Lavillatte rang the Angelus. When Rochette was about to be executed, he cried, "Cursed masters, what have you not made me do?" The last words of the accused raised suspicion as to the true nature of the innkeepers. It was said that a crowd of approximately 30,000 attended the execution. Paul d'Albigny reports in his book about the Red Inn that, on the day of the execution, a ball was organized in front of the premises.

The current building has been changed since 1831 and is now a tourist attraction in Ardeche, claiming the title of "authentic auberge de Peyrebeille". A terrace was built at the end of the farmhouse, which shelters a museum preserving the furniture of the time, though the decor has been subjected to some changes. To the east of the historic inn, a hotel-restaurant and gas station have been added.

The French expression "ne pas etre sorti de l'auberge" (roughly equivalent to 'not out of the woods yet') is sometimes said to refer to the crimes at Peyrebeille but, while they gave additional point to the saying, it predates them.

== In popular media ==
=== Board games ===
The Belgian publisher Pearl Games published The Bloody Inn in 2015, a board game designed by Nicolas Robert and inspired by the crimes at Peyrebeille. The English edition is currently published by Asmodee.

=== Film adaptations ===
Two films were inspired by the events:

- The Red Inn (1951), directed by Claude Autant-Lara. A crime-comedy with Francoise Rosay and Julien Carette as the innkeepers and Fernandel in the role of a monk to whom they confess their crimes/sins.
- The Red Inn (2007), a remake of the 1951 film directed by Gérard Krawczyk. With Gérard Jugnot in the role of the priest and Josiane Balasko and Christian Clavier as innkeepers.

=== Books ===
L'Auberge rouge, a short story by Honoré de Balzac, published in 1831, has no connection with the various events at Peyrebeille.

Among the serious works which have reconsidered the case can be noted Peyrebeille by Felix Viallet and Charles Almeras which reaffirms the guilt of the Martins.

L'Auberge sanglante de Peirebeilhe was a novel by Jules Beaujoint that was inspired by various events that happened in 1885 and is illustrated by Jose F. Roy.

Victor Chauvet prepared to publish in the journal Lyon Républican a serial "The Crimes of Peyrebeille", which was announced in a display by Jules Chéret.

L'Auberge rouge (CNRS Éditions), by historian Thierry Boudignon, challenges the official theory and suggests that the case of the Red Inn was a terrible miscarriage of justice based on rumours, dubious witnesses, and the need to "make an example". It is based on the documents from local and national archives, analyses the procedures of the instruction (preparation of the case), and shows that patois was an obstacle because the clerk of the court "interpreted" in French testimony given in patois, rather than simply translating what witnesses said. It concludes that the objective of the magistrates was to develop a convincing narrative in order to influence the decision of the jury. Facts forbidden by law were presented in order to discredit the couple; the inadmissibility of some evidence didn't prevent the legal system (Note: 'La justice, the phrase in the French Wikipedia, can be either 'justice' or 'the legal system'.) from using it to secure a conviction. (Note: The legal system complained repeatedly of "scandalous acquittals" by juries reluctant to convict their fellow citizens, especially respectable ones, but noted also convictions (legally dubious, but considered morally sound) of the disreputable. A generation earlier a senior magistrate had noted: The weakness of age, gender, incapacity, hunger, extreme poverty, drunkenness; a voluntary confession or the negligible profit derived from the crime; the rigour of the penalty; and above all the good reputation of the accused before the crime are often motives to the jurors for absolution... When it is proven that the accused is a mauvais sujet, the juries are severe; if his conduct is that of a scoundrel, they are inexorable and very easy to convince...We can all recall the adroit, well-defended scoundrels accused of serious crimes whom the former courts would not have dared to condemn ... because judicial proof was lacking; but the juries are convinced. Woloch (1995) explicitly notes this problem/feature of jury trial to have been a complaint into the 1840s.)

On the same topic, L'Auberge rouge: l'énigme de Peyrebeille, 1833 (The Red Inn: The Enigma of Peyrebeille, 1833), a novel by Michel Peyramaure, came out in 2003. It abandons the contemporary view that justice was done when the murderers were guillotined. Progressively, the author sows doubt, asking from the evidence reported in contemporary accounts, if this triple execution wasn't the biggest miscarriage of justice in the 19th century.

== See also ==
- List of incidents of cannibalism
