= The Curtain Rises =

- Directed by: Marc Allégret
- Written by: André Cavin; André Cayatte; Henri Jeanson
- Starring: Louis Jouvet; Claude Dauphin; Odette Joyeux
- Cinematography: Émile Bourreaud; Robert Juillard; Christian Matras
- Edited by: Yvonne Martin
- Music by: Georges Auric
- Production company: Regina Films
- Distributed by: Filmsonor
- Release date: 6 October 1938
- Running time: 99 minutes
- Country: France
- Language: French

The Curtain Rises (French: Entrée des artistes) is a 1938 French crime film directed by Marc Allégret and starring Louis Jouvet, Claude Dauphin and Odette Joyeux. It was shot at the Epinay Studios in Paris and on location around the city. The film's sets were designed by the art directors Jacques Krauss and Alexandre Trauner.

== Cast ==
- Louis Jouvet as Le professeur Lambertin
- Claude Dauphin as François Polti
- Odette Joyeux as Coecilia
- Janine Darcey as Isabelle
- André Brunot as Monsieur Grenaison
- Madeleine Lambert as Élisabeth
- Roger Blin as Dominique
- Noël Roquevert as Pignolet
- Julien Carette as Lurette
- Marcel Dalio as le juge d'instruction
- Bernard Blier as Pescani
- Yves Brainville as Sylvestre
- André Roussin as Giflard
- Robert Pizani as Jérome

== Bibliography ==
- Dudley Andrew. Mists of Regret: Culture and Sensibility in Classic French Film. Princeton University Press, 1995.
