= Mercédès Brare =

French actress (1880–1967)

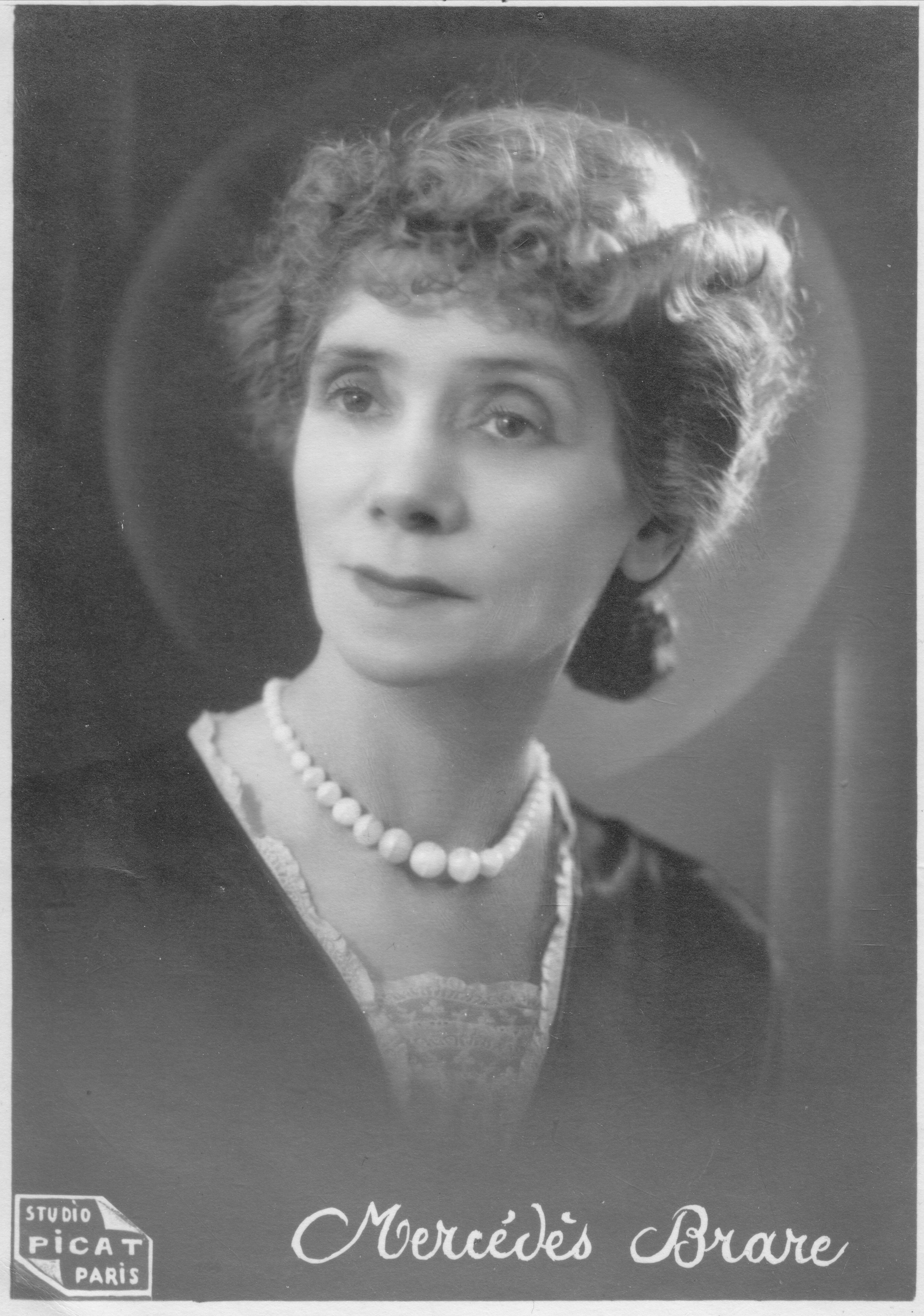
- Mercédès Brare
- Born: Mercédès Emma Josèphe Brare; December 20, 1880; Paris, France
- Died: January 24, 1967 (aged 86); Paris, France
- Occupation: Actress
- Years active: 1902–1951

Mercédès Brare (born Mercédès Emma Josèphe Brare; December 20, 1880 – January 24, 1967) was a French actress active in film roles from the 1930s to the 1950s.

== Filmography ==
- 1931: Faubourg Montmartre by Raymond Bernard
- 1932: His Best Client by Pierre Colombier
- 1933: Toto by Jacques Tourneur - Une concurrente de Miss Occasion
- 1942: Le Grand Combat by Bernard Roland
- 1943: The Phantom Baron by Serge de Poligny
- 1944: Le Voyageur sans bagage by Jean Anouilh
- 1945: Alone in the Night by Christian Stengel
- 1946: Lunegarde by Marc Allégret
- 1946: L'Homme au chapeau rond by Pierre Billon
- 1946: Martin Roumagnac by Georges Lacombe
- 1951: La vie est un jeu by Raymond Leboursier

== Theatre ==
- 1940: Léocadia by Jean Anouilh, Théâtre de la Michodière

== Publications ==
- Poèmes en prose, La Haye-Pesnel, Manche, imprimerie Garlan, 1947 BnF 318662542
- La concierge est dans sa loge, sketch with one character, La Haye-Pesnel, Manche, imprimerie Garlan, 1947
- Hector, sketch with one character, La Haye-Pesnel, Manche, imprimerie Garlan, 1947
