= The Courier of Lyon =

1937 film

- Directed by: Claude Autant-Lara; Maurice Lehmann
- Written by: Jean Aurenche; Claude Autant-Lara; Alfred Delacour (play); Louis-Mathurin Moreau (play); Jacques Prévert; Paul Siraudin (play)
- Produced by: Albert N. Chaperau
- Starring: Pierre Blanchar; Dita Parlo; Jacques Copeau
- Cinematography: Michel Kelber
- Edited by: Yvonne Martin; Marguerite Renoir
- Music by: Louis Beydts
- Production company: Productions Maurice Lehmann
- Distributed by: Compagnie Commerciale Française Cinématographique
- Release date: 10 November 1937
- Running time: 102 minutes
- Country: France
- Language: French

The Courier of Lyon (French: L'affaire du courrier de Lyon) is a 1937 French historical drama film directed by Claude Autant-Lara and Maurice Lehmann and starring Pierre Blanchar, Dita Parlo and Jacques Copeau. It is based on the Courrier de Lyon case of 1796. A previous silent film inspired by the story, was released in 1923.

It was shot at the Epinay Studios in Paris. The film's sets were designed by the art director Jacques Krauss.

== Cast ==
- Pierre Blanchar as Pierre-Joseph Lesurques
- Dita Parlo as Mina Lesurques
- Jacques Copeau as Le procureur-juge Daubenton
- Charles Dullin as Le témoin aveugle
- Sylvia Bataille as Madeleine Brebant
- Hélène Robert as Eugénie Dargence
- Monique Joyce as Claudine Faugier-Odot
- Pierre Alcover as Valentin Durochat
- Jean Tissier as Courriol
- Jean-Pierre Kérien as Jean Bruer
- André Noël as Franck Excofon
- Jean Périer as Le bijoutier Eugène Legrand
- Louis Florencie as Jean Delafolie
- Marcel Duhamel as Guénot
- Palmyre Levasseur as La femme Grossetête
- Gilberte Géniat as La fille Sauton
- Lily Laub as Madame Tallien
- Jacqueline Jessus as Margot Lesurques
- Jacques Varennes as Le président Gohier
- Andrex (actor)|Andrex as L'avocat de Lesurques
- Philippe Rolla as L'accusateur public
- Dorville as Pierre Choppart
- Michel François as Pierre Lesurques
- Bernard Lorrain as Le fils du notaire

== Bibliography ==
- Dayna Oscherwitz & MaryEllen Higgins. The A to Z of French Cinema. Scarecrow Press, 2009.
