= Château de Rauzan =

Castle in Gironde, France

Coordinates: 44°46′50″N 0°07′36″W

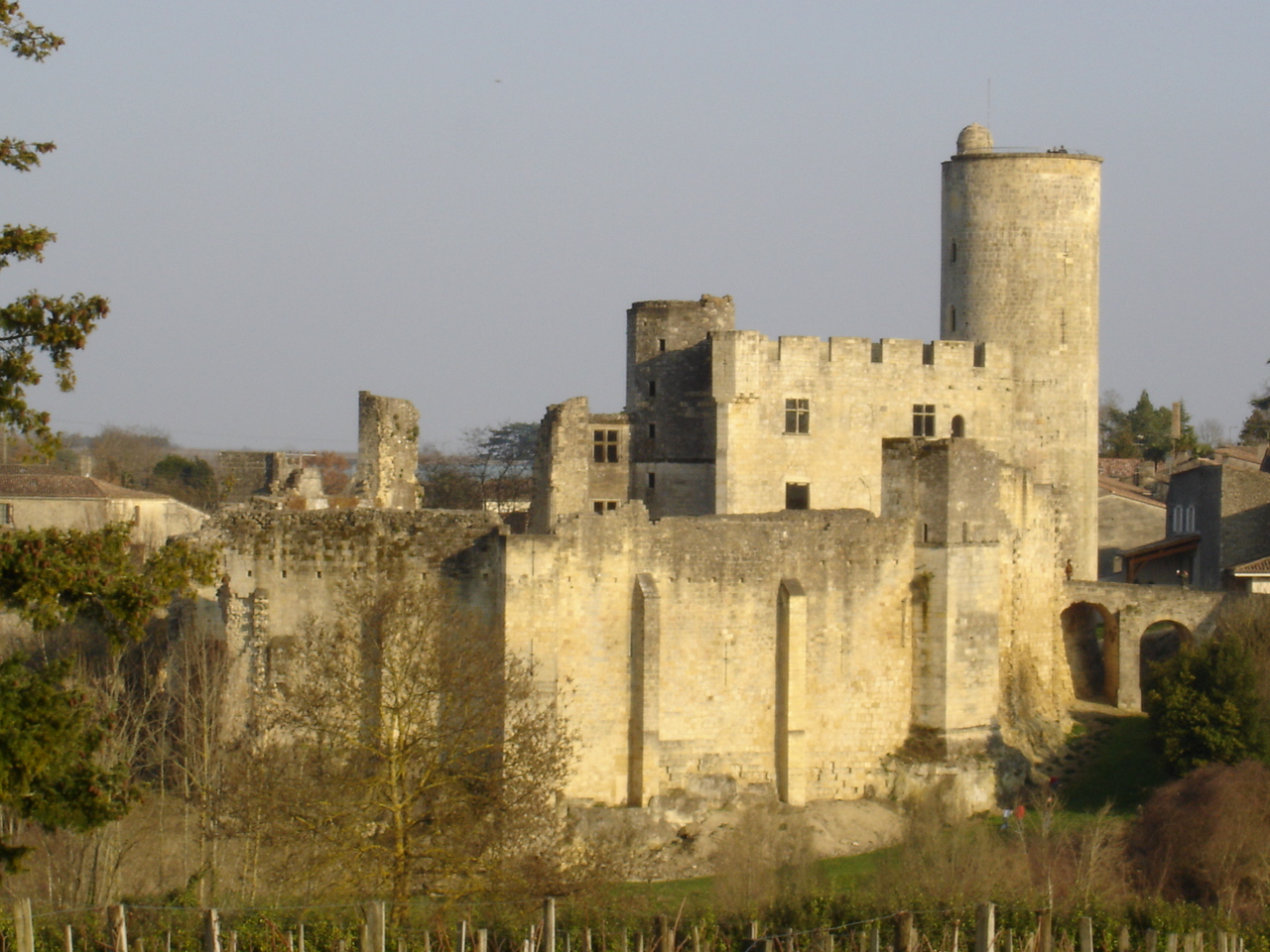
Rauzan Castle

Château de Rauzan is a castle in the French commune of Rauzan, in the Gironde département of France.

Built by John Lackland, Duke of Normandy (1199–1204), Duke of Guyenne (1199–1216) and King of England (1199–1216), the castle was built on a rock occupied since ancient times. During the Hundred Years' War (1337–1453), the castle was captured twice by the French.

It has been listed since 1862 as a monument historique by the French Ministry of Culture. From 1970, the commune of Rauzan, owner since 1900, and lovers of medieval architecture, have undertaken work of clearing and restoration.

== History ==
The castle at Rauzan was erected in the 13th century by John, King of England. It then became the property of Rudel of Bergerac (1223–1320), then of Guillaume-Raymond of Madaillan (1320–1391) who fought at the side of the Black Prince, governor of Guyenne of 1356 to 1370, at the Battle of Poitiers in 1356 and at the imprisonment of the King of France, John II ("John the Good").

In October 1370, Bertrand of Guesclin returned to France where he was made constable to Charles V and began his big venture to expel the English from France. Contrary to the habits of the French chivalry, he did not proceed to the great mountains with the entire French army, but preferred to methodically reconquer whole provinces, besieging castle after castle. He would chase the English from Normandy, Guyenne, Saintonge and Poitou. The castle in Rauzan was captured in 1377.

Rauzan was then the subject of a law suit between Henri IV (1367–1413) and Jeanne of Armagnac, great-granddaughter of Saint Louis and wife of Guillaume-Amanieu of Madaillan (1375–1414), the last male representative of that branch, whose wife had a daughter named Agnès, who died young. At the death of her husband, she won the right to remarry a Frenchman on condition of giving up the castle.

Rauzan then fell to Bernard Angevin (1437–1480), whose opportunistic attitude pointed the English camp to the French camp in accordance to his interests. At the end of the Hundred Years' War, he sided with the crown of France and retained all of his property. As the troubles of the war passed, he refurbished the castle little by little as it evolved from a fortified castle into a residential château.

Rauzan then passed into the hands of Durfort of Duras who gradually abandoned it. Bordeaux quarrymen extracted stones of the building (for cutting tombstones) and blocks of rock on which it was based, which caused the northern part of the château to fall. The ruins became, in 1819, the property of Chastellux before the town acquired it in 1900.

== Building description ==
The building secured three main functions that characterised medieval castles: defence, housing and reflection of the power of the family.

=== The castle entrance ===
The entrance was protected by several defensive elements. A barbican controlled the drawbridge and access to the castle. There was another drawbridge that has disappeared. The door was protected by a portcullis with a watch tower and the keep to the left.

=== The keep ===
The keep's cylindrical plan was built around 1325. Each floor has three arches. On the first floor it had a trapdoor in the centre of the room provided access to the storerooms below. The second floor has the oldest castle fireplace. Parts of the third and fourth floors are more spacious because they were built on an octagonal plan and have much wider arches. Also, they are not cluttered with chimneys because they were heated with heating vents.

=== The stately home ===
Built in the early century 14th, the stately home was completely remodeled in the 15th century. When it was built, a central separating wall and cross windows were introduced onto the courtyard outside. It can be accessed from the courtyard on the ground floor or the staircase serving all floors. On the first floor was the reception room in which only a few frescoes remain. The lord’s apartments were in the second floor; all of the rooms in this home contained fireplaces.

The ladies' quarters (northeast) were built in the 16th century but were completely destroyed in 19th century, when the castle was abandoned.

A round walk served various homes. The door of honour is Gothic styled and decorated with the arms of Bernard Angevin and Duras Durfort.

=== The west buildings ===
Along the west wall, facing the stately home, sit buildings that overlook the courtyard which remain on the foundation today. This structure was a very common defensive system. Parts which remain include latrines leading into the ditch, a walkway accessed by stairs. A ditch and towers to the prison lay around the well; both have been ruined.

=== The northern wall ===
Nothing remains in this part of the building due to the quarrymen of Bordeaux extracting its stone for carving tombstones which caused the wall to collapse in 1845.

== Film ==
Serge de Poligny filmed Le Baron fantôme (The Phantom Baron, 1942) at Château de Rauzan.

== See also ==
- List of castles in France
