= Madeleine Gug =

French film editor

- Born: 4 August 1913; Les Pavillons-sous-Bois, France
- Died: 24 August 1991 (aged 78); Nice, France
- Occupation: Film editor
- Years active: 1938–1969 (film)

Madeleine Gug (1913–1971) was a French film editor. She worked with Henri-Georges Clouzot on the 1955 film Les Diaboliques. She also collaborated on a number of occasions with Claude Autant-Lara.

== Selected filmography ==
- Troubled Heart (1938)
- White Patrol (1942)
- The Inevitable Monsieur Dubois (1943)
- Shot in the Night (1943)
- Home Port (1943)
- Vautrin (1943)
- Love Story (1943)
- Six Hours to Lose (1946)
- Sylvie and the Ghost (1946)
- Devil in the Flesh (1947)
- Keep an Eye on Amelia (1949)
- Barry (1949)
- I Like Only You (1949)
- Wedding Night (1950)
- The Red Inn (1951)
- Love, Madame (1952)
- Twelve Hours of Happiness (1952)
- The Wages of Fear (1953)
- Good Lord Without Confession (1953)
- Les Diaboliques (1955)
- Lola Montès (1955)
- Marguerite de la nuit (1955)
- The Affair of the Poisons (1955)
- La Traversée de Paris (1956)
- Lovers of Paris (1957)
- The Gambler (1958)
- In Case of Adversity (1958)
- Between Love and Duty (1960)
- The Trip to Biarritz (1963)
- Enough Rope (1963)
- A Woman in White (1965)
- Two for the Road (1967)

== Bibliography ==
- Susan Hayward. Les Diaboliques. University of Illinois Press, 2005.
