= Monseigneur (film) =

1949 film

- Directed by: Roger Richebé
- Written by: Pierre Lestringuez; Roger Richebé; Carlo Rim
- Based on: Monseigneur by Jean Martet
- Produced by: Pierre Lestringuez; Roger Richebé
- Starring: Fernand Ledoux; Bernard Blier; Nadia Gray
- Cinematography: Philippe Agostini
- Edited by: Yvonne Martin
- Music by: Henri Verdun
- Production company: Les Films Roger Richebé
- Distributed by: Les Films Roger Richebé
- Release date: 16 December 1949
- Running time: 95 minutes
- Country: France
- Language: French

Monseigneur is a 1949 French drama film directed by Roger Richebé and starring Fernand Ledoux, Bernard Blier and Nadia Gray. It was shot at the Neuilly Studios in Paris and on location around the city. The film's sets were designed by the art director Jacques Krauss; Pierre Balmain was the costume designer.

== Synopsis ==
Piétrefond, a historian, claims to have discovered in the archives that a humble locksmith Louis Mennechain is really descendant of the guillotined monarch of France Louis XVI. Louis is taken up by an attractive duchess and her friends, and begins to become dazzled before his new status. Piétrefond reveals to him that the whole thing is really a scam to make money, and Louis returns to his fiancée Anna and his previous existence. Yet doubts continue in his mind about his possible royal heritage.

== Cast ==
- Fernand Ledoux as Piétrefond
- Bernard Blier as Louis Mennechain
- Nadia Gray as La duchesse de Lémoncourt
- Yves Deniaud as Bellare
- Marion Tourès as Anna
- Paul Frankeur as Le forain
- Gabriel Gobin as Tatave
- Jeanne Lion as Mme de Ponthieux
- Paul Faivre as Le général de Lormaux
- Richard Francoeur as Le maître d'hôtel
- Georges Tourreil as Le marquis
- Léon Walther as Le majordome
- Maurice Escande as Le duc de Saint Germain

== Bibliography ==
- Bessy, Maurice & Chirat, Raymond. Histoire du cinéma français: encyclopédie des films, 1940–1950. Pygmalion, 1986
- Oscherwitz, Dayna & Higgins, MaryEllen . The A to Z of French Cinema. Scarecrow Press, 2009.
- Rège, Philippe. Encyclopedia of French Film Directors, Volume 1. Scarecrow Press, 2009.
