= The Red Inn (2007 film) =

L'Auberge rouge
- Theatrical release poster
- Directed by: Gérard Krawczyk
- Written by: Christian Clavier; Michel Delgado
- Based on: L'auberge rouge by Jean Aurenche
- Produced by: Christian Fechner; Alexandra Fechner; Hervé Truffaut; Jean Louis Nieuwbourg
- Starring: Josiane Balasko; Gérard Jugnot; Christian Clavier
- Cinematography: Gérard Sterin
- Edited by: Nicolas Trembasiewicz
- Music by: Alexandre Azaria
- Production company: Les Films Christian Fechner
- Distributed by: Warner Bros. Pictures
- Release date: 5 December 2007
- Running time: 95 minutes
- Country: France
- Language: French
- Budget: $24 million
- Box office: $8.1 million

L'Auberge rouge (The Red Inn) is a 2007 French comedy crime film directed by Gérard Krawczyk. The film is a remake of the 1951 film L'Auberge rouge by Claude Autant-Lara, which was inspired by crimes that happened at Peyrebeille Inn.

== Plot ==
In the 19th century, the Crouteux Inn, located in the Pyrenees mountains, is owned by Pierre and Rose Martin. The innkeepers regularly order their deaf-mute adopted son, Violet, to rob and murder their guests. One evening, a group of travelers take refuge in the inn after having trouble with their stagecoach. Among the travelers is Father Carnus, who is traveling with a novice to a local monastery. Pierre wants to kill the group and take their possessions, but after his deeply religious wife refuses to kill the priest, things go badly for the couple.

== Cast ==
- Christian Clavier as Pierre Martin
- Josiane Balasko as Rose Martin
- Gérard Jugnot as Father Carnus
- Jean-Baptiste Maunier as Octave
- Sylvie Joly as Countess of Marcillac
- Anne Girouard as Marie-Odile de Marcillac
- Urbain Cancelier as Philippe de Marcillac
- François-Xavier Demaison as Simon Barbeuf
- Jean-Christophe Bouvet as Lawyer Rouget
- Laurent Gamelon as The woodcutter
- Christian Bujeau as The captain
- Juliette Lamboley as Mathilde
- Fred Epaud as Violet
- Jan Rouiller as Duflot
- Olivier Saladin as The coachman

== Production ==
Filming took place at the Plateau de Beille in the Ariège department and at the Pont d'Espagne in Cauterets (Hautes-Pyrénées).
