= Alone in the Night (1945 film) =

1945 film

- Directed by: Christian Stengel
- Written by: Yves Boisyvon; Jacqueline Boisyvon; Christian Stengel; Marc-Gilbert Sauvajon
- Produced by: Raymond Borderie; Adrien Remaugé
- Starring: Bernard Blier; Sophie Desmarets; Jacques Pills
- Cinematography: Christian Matras
- Edited by: Claude Ibéria
- Music by: Francis Lopez; Louiguy; Jean Solar
- Color process: Black and white
- Production company: Général Films
- Distributed by: Pathé Consortium Cinéma
- Release date: 21 November 1945
- Running time: 100 minutes
- Country: France
- Language: French

Alone in the Night (French: Seul dans la nuit) is a 1945 French crime film directed by Christian Stengel, and starring Bernard Blier, Sophie Desmarets and Jacques Pills.

== Synopsis ==
A series of murders are being perpetrated in Paris. Strangely, during each of the crimes, a signature song of a famous popular singer is heard, at first by an eccentric old man. The police inspector on his first case follows several leads around the entourage of the singer, and the daughter of a police commissioner through a radio show draws the chase through a nocturnal Paris, to a disused theatre where the assassin has lured his final victim.

== Cast ==
- Bernard Blier as L'inspecteur Robert Pascal
- Sophie Desmarets as Thérèse Planquine, daughter of the commissaire
- Jacques Pills as Marny, alias : Jacques Sartory, a popular singer
- Jean Davy as Alain Dalbrey, Sartory's secretary
- Louis Salou as Mr Tolu, an eccentric old man
- Jacques Morel as Raymond Melor, the impersonator
- Marcel André as Police commissaire Planquine
- Jean Wall as Stéphane Marcheau, pianist and composer
- Robert Le Fort as Inspecteur Legal
- Annette Poivre as Mireille, short-hand typist
- Ginette Baudin as Liliane Roy, friend of Sartory
- André Wasley as Inspecteur Bernard
- Jacques Dynam as Hunter
- Nathalie Nattier as Louise Chabot, one of the victims
- Sylvaine Claudel as apprentice
- Ariane Muratore as Madame Lalorgue
- Odette Barancey as Odette, the Planquines's servant
- Luce Fabiole as Madame Henry
- Emile Riandreys as Deval, journalist
- Jacques Hélian and his orchestra
- Mercédès Brare
- Denise Benoît
- Léonce Corne

== Background ==
The person originally chosen for the role of Jacques Sartory was André Claveau, but as he was still under a cloud due to his activities during the Occupation, the producers moved on to Jacques Jansen, known for opera and operetta, before finally casting Jacques Pills.

The film recorded admissions in France of 2,844,119. It was shot at the Joinville Studios in Paris. The film's sets were designed by the art director Robert Gys.

== Bibliography ==
- Raymond Chirat : Catalogue des films français de long métrage. Films de fiction 1940-1950 (Editions Imprimerie Saint-Paul, S.A., Luxembourg 1981), N°684.
