= Sylvie and the Ghost =

1946 film

- Directed by: Claude Autant-Lara
- Screenplay by: Jean Aurenche
- Based on: Sylvie et le fantôme by Alfred Adam
- Produced by: André Paulvé
- Starring: Odette Joyeux; François Périer; Pierre Larquey
- Cinematography: Philippe Agostini
- Edited by: Madeleine Gug
- Music by: René Cloërec
- Production company: Écran Français
- Distributed by: DisCina
- Release date: 6 February 1946
- Running time: 97 minutes
- Country: France
- Language: French

Sylvie and the Ghost (French: Sylvie et le fantôme) is a 1946 French fantasy/comedy film directed by Claude Autant-Lara and starring Odette Joyeux, François Périer and Pierre Larquey. It was shot at the Saint-Maurice Studios in Paris. The film's sets were designed by the art directors Jacques Krauss and Lucien Carré.

== Plot ==
Sylvie and her family live in a magnificent ancestral château, but they need money. Her father, Baron Eduard, sells a large portrait of Alain de Francigny to an art dealer eager to get a bargain. Alain and Sylvie's grandmother were lovers. She visited him using a secret passage that the portrait now conceals. Alain was killed in a duel with Sylvie's grandmother's first husband. Alain's faithful spaniel, who pined away after his death, is by his side in the portrait, and the family dog, Pyramus, barks relentlessly at the image.

Sylvia, who is about to celebrate her 16th birthday, has been fascinated by Alain for years. She believes in his ghost, although she has never seen it.

To delay Sylvie's distress at the sale, the picture is crated and taken down the hidden stair in secret. At the bottom, Alain's ghost emerges, followed by his little spaniel. They move about the castle, observing the family, particularly Sylvia.

Frederick, the son of the art dealer, feels sorry for Sylvia, and asks his father why they could not have loaned the Baron the money. His father is disgusted with him.

Sylvie mourns the fact that Alain will not be there for her 16th birthday. Her father reassures her—and gets an idea. He will hire an actor to appear as Alain's ghost. In the middle of the night, a thief, Ramure, sneaks in to steal the painting and is disappointed to find it gone. Alain and his dog, who are sleeping in the empty frame, are awakened by his flashlight.

Ramure finds his way to Sylvie's room and steals a cameo, an heirloom from her grandmother. Frederick enters through a window, a bouquet of flowers in his hand, and tells Ramure to put the brooch back. Their quarrel awakens Pyramus and Hector, but Hector thinks they are candidates for the role of Alain's ghost. The real actor, Anicet, arrives. He specializes in portraying Hamlet's father's ghost, and is disappointed that the role does not require him to frighten anyone. Then the police arrive at the door, seeking Ramure, who escaped from custody.The Baron goes down to invite them to search the grounds.

When the Baron returns, Ramure suggests that all three of them participate in the illusion.

The night of the ball. Sylvia credits the disappearance of her cameo to Alain, who is now wearing evening clothes. He descends the stairs with her. The “actors” dress in identical sheets, with pointed hoods.

Sylvia talks to Ramure (in costume) alone and asks him for the cameo. He slips away while she pins it on. Frederick enters the ball, shrouded, scaring everyone away to the garden, except Sylvia. She confides her attraction for a young man whose name she does not know—Frederick himself. Or is it Ramure? When it is Anicet's turn. Alain tries to steal the robes and eventually trips him. Anicet falls downstairs into the arms of the police, who unmask him, revealing the Baron's plot.

Alain steals the robes.in order to appear to Sylvia, but is pursued by the company. Eventually Ramure goes to Sylvia and Frederick breaks in on them. They both love her. Ramure jumps into the moat to escape the police. Frederick leaves and Alain, in robes, approaches Sylvia. Thinking it is Frederick, she tells him that he makes her want to live in the world. Alain withdraws and goes downstairs with the Baron. His hood is removed and his invisibility and ability to fly show he is a real ghost,

On the landing, Sylvie removes an ornament from her hair. Alain is able to pick up the ghost of it, as Sylvie and Frederick walk away, arm in arm. Holding the glittering star tenderly, Alain rises above the château, into a sky spangled with stars, summoning his faithful spaniel to follow. He rises higher and higher, until the star becomes fixed in the sky.

== Cast ==
- Odette Joyeux as Sylvie
- François Périer as Ramure
- Pierre Larquey as Baron Eduard
- Claude Marcy as La comtesse des Vertus
- Jean Desailly as Frederick
- Paul Demange as The Counsellor
- Marguerite Cassan as Marthe
- Raymond Rognoni as Damas
- Gabrielle Fontan as Mariette
- Jacques Tati as The Ghost of Alain de Francigny
- Louis Salou as Anicet
- Julien Carette as Hector, the majordomo
- Ana María Cassan as Girl
- Lise Topart as Girl

== Production ==
The special effect of the ghost appearing was achieved by filming through a glass pane and using two identical sets. Through the glass, the primary set would be visible. This was a regular set where all actors appeared, except the ghost (Tati). At the same time the reflection would be visible of the second set, placed at a ninety degree angle to the primary set. This set was covered entirely in black velvet, and the only actor on this set was Tati (see Pepper's ghost).
