= Rauzan =

- Commune
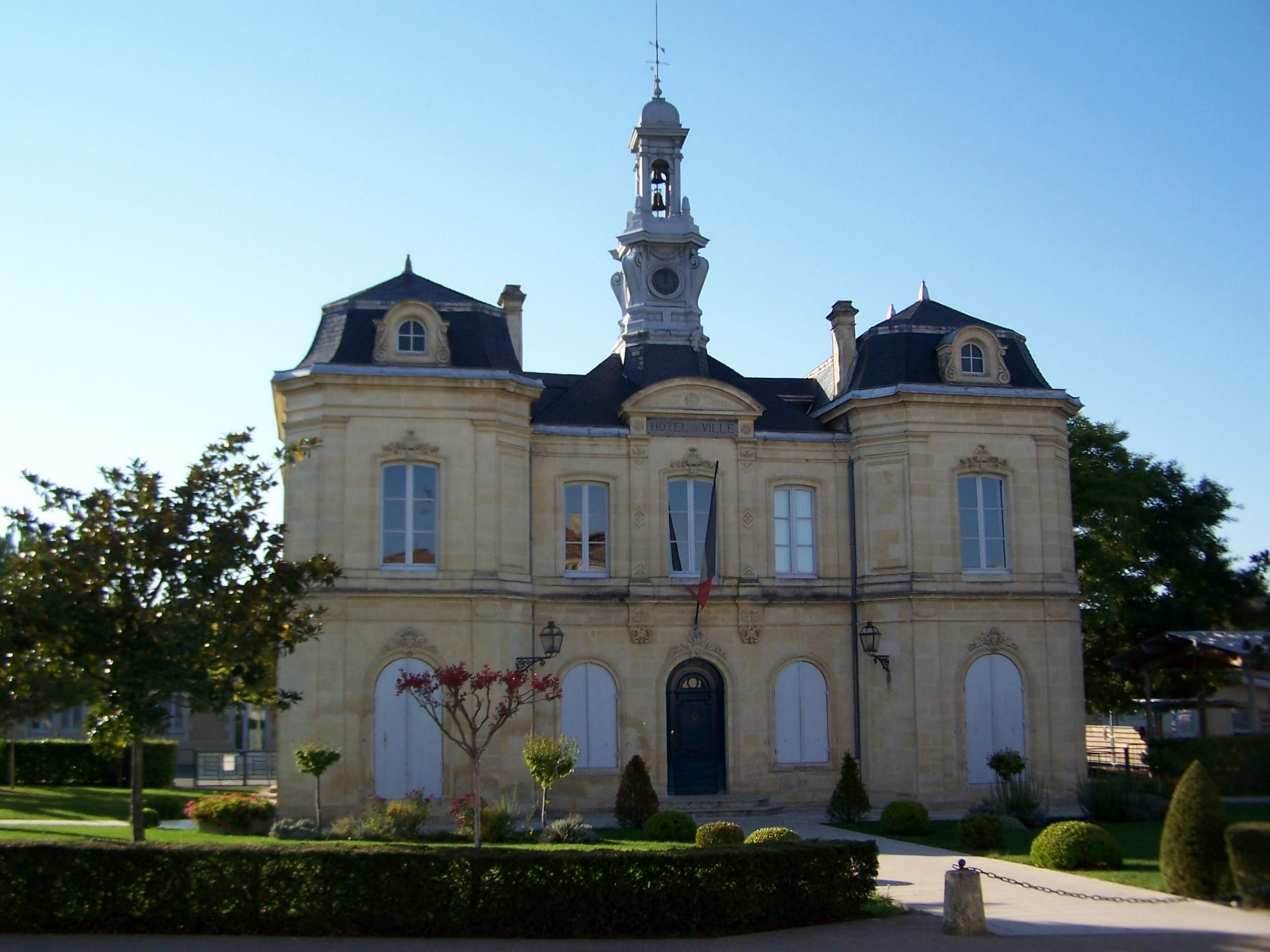
- Town hall

- Coat of arms
- Location of Rauzan
- Location within France Location within Nouvelle-Aquitaine
- Coordinates: 44°46′47″N 0°07′25″W
- Country: France
- Region: Nouvelle-Aquitaine
- Department: Gironde
- Arrondissement: Libourne
- Canton: Les Coteaux de Dordogne
- Intercommunality: Castillon Pujols

Government
  - Mayor (2024–2026): Christophe Quebec
- Area^{1}: 6.5 km^{2} (2.5 sq mi)
- Elevation: 75 m (246 ft)
- Highest elevation: 100 m (330 ft)
- Lowest elevation: 5 m (16 ft)
- Population (2023): 1,247
  - Density: 190/km^{2} (500/sq mi)
- Time zone: UTC+01:00 (CET)
  - Summer (DST): UTC+02:00 (CEST)
- INSEE/Postal code: 33350 /33420
- ^{1} French Land Register data, which excludes lakes, ponds, glaciers > 1 km^{2} (0.386 sq mi or 247 acres) and river estuaries.

Rauzan (French pronunciation: [ʁozɑ̃]; Occitan: Rausan) is a commune in the Gironde department in Nouvelle-Aquitaine in southwestern France. It contains the ruins of a castle, the Château de Rauzan, a tourist attraction.

== Population ==
Historical population
Year	Pop.	±% p.a.
1968	858	—
1975	903	+0.73%
1982	888	−0.24%
1990	978	+1.21%
1999	1,035	+0.63%
2007	1,121	+1.00%
2012	1,181	+1.05%
2017	1,211	+0.50%
2023	1,247	+0.49%
Source: INSEE

== See also ==
- Communes of the Gironde department
