= Love Letters (1942 film) =

1942 film

- Directed by: Claude Autant-Lara
- Written by: Jean Aurenche; Maurice Blondeau
- Based on: Love Letters by Jean Aurenche
- Produced by: Wilfrid Baumgartner; Denise Tual; Roland Tual
- Starring: Odette Joyeux; François Périer; Julien Carette
- Cinematography: Philippe Agostini
- Edited by: Yvonne Martin
- Music by: Maurice Yvain
- Production company: Productions Synops
- Distributed by: Les Films Roger Richebé
- Release date: 23 December 1942
- Running time: 110 minutes
- Country: France
- Language: French

Love Letters (French: Lettres d'amour) is a 1942 French historical drama film directed by Claude Autant-Lara and starring Odette Joyeux, François Périer and Julien Carette. It was shot at the Boulogne Studios in Paris during the German Occupation. The film's sets were designed by the art directors Robert Dumesnil and Jacques Krauss while the costumes were designed by Christian Dior.

== Cast ==
- Odette Joyeux as Zélie Fontaine
- François Périer as François de Portal
- Julien Carette as Loriquet - le maître à danser
- Simone Renant as La préfète Hortense de la Jacquerie
- André Alerme as Le marquis de Longevialle
- Jean Debucourt as L'empereur Napoléon III
- Jean Parédès as Désiré Ledru
- Robert Vattier as Maître Boubousson
- Louis Salou as Monsieur de Mortemort
- Jacqueline Champi as Marinette
- Ariane Murator as Charlotte
- Gilles Quéant as Le fou de la danse
- Yves Deniaud as Le maire
- Georges Pally as Daronne
- Jean-Pierre Kérien as Le postillon
- Martial Rèbe as Le président
- Robert Arnoux as Monsieur de la Jacquerie
- Henri de Livry as Le ministre de la Justice

== Bibliography ==
- Rège, Philippe. Encyclopedia of French Film Directors, Volume 1. Scarecrow Press, 2009.
- Siclier, Jacques. La France de Pétain et son cinéma. H. Veyrier, 1981.
- Williams, Alan L. Republic of Images: A History of French Filmmaking. Harvard University Press, 1992.
