= Love Story (1943 film) =

1943 film

- Directed by: Claude Autant-Lara
- Screenplay by: Jean Aurenche; Pierre Bost
- Based on: Douce by Michel Davet
- Produced by: Pierre Guerlais
- Starring: Odette Joyeux; Madeleine Robinson; Marguerite Moreno; Jean Debucourt; Roger Pigaut
- Cinematography: Philippe Agostini
- Edited by: Madeleine Gug
- Music by: René Cloërec
- Production company: Industrie Cinématographique
- Distributed by: La Société des Films Sirius
- Release date: 10 November 1943
- Running time: 109 minutes
- Country: France
- Language: French

Love Story (French: Douce) is a 1943 French historical romantic drama film directed by Claude Autant-Lara and starring Odette Joyeux, Madeleine Robinson and Marguerite Moreno. The film's sets were designed by the art director Jacques Krauss.

== Plot ==
At the end of the 19th century, Irène was the governess of the young Douce de Bonafé and had the manager Fabien as a lover, with whom Douce was in love. Fabien would like to take Irene to Canada, but she is tempted by the idea of marrying the master of the house, a widower, Douce's father. She throws herself into Fabien's arms, who leaves with her and takes revenge on Irene and her masters, but he is gradually seduced by the young girl.

Douce is ready to live poor, far from France and her family, but not to replace her governess. She is about to return to her family when she tragically dies.

== Cast ==
- Odette Joyeux as Douce
- Madeleine Robinson as Irène Comtat
- Marguerite Moreno as Madame Bonafé
- Jean Debucourt as Engelbert Bonafé
- Roger Pigaut as Fabien Marani
- Gabrielle Fontan as Estelle
- Julienne Paroli as La vieille Thérèse
- Georges Bever as Le frotteur

== Bibliography ==
- Leteux, Christine. Continental Films: French Cinema Under German Control. University of Wisconsin Pres, 2022.
