= Lanarce =

- Commune
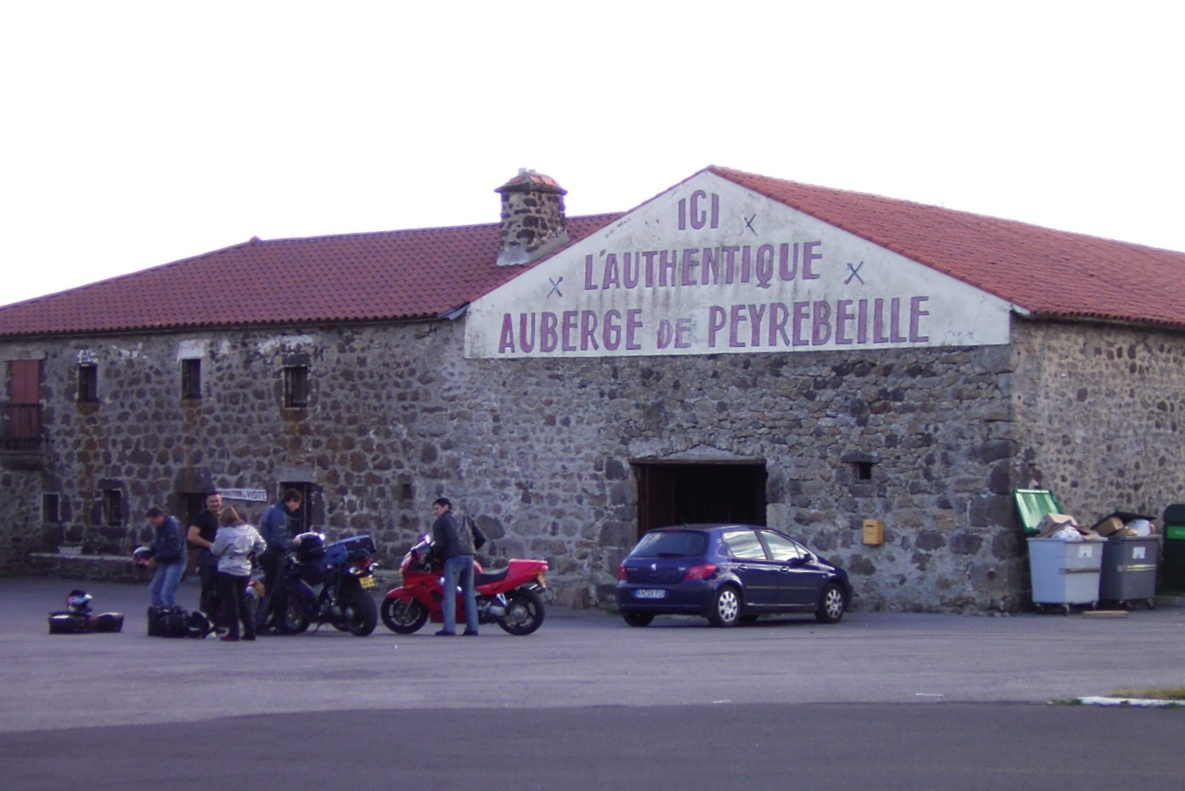
- The Auberge rouge in Lanarce
- Location of Lanarce
- Location within France Location within Auvergne-Rhône-Alpes
- Coordinates: 44°43′45″N 4°00′14″E
- Country: France
- Region: Auvergne-Rhône-Alpes
- Department: Ardèche
- Arrondissement: Largentière
- Canton: Haute-Ardèche

Government
  - Mayor (2020–2026): Bernard Jacquemin
- Area^{1}: 22.37 km^{2} (8.64 sq mi)
- Elevation: 1,185 m (3,888 ft)
- Highest elevation: 1,412 m (4,633 ft)
- Lowest elevation: 1,094 m (3,589 ft)
- Population (2023): 212
  - Density: 9.48/km^{2} (24.5/sq mi)
- Time zone: UTC+01:00 (CET)
  - Summer (DST): UTC+02:00 (CEST)
- INSEE/Postal code: 07130 /07660
- ^{1} French Land Register data, which excludes lakes, ponds, glaciers > 1 km^{2} (0.386 sq mi or 247 acres) and river estuaries.

Lanarce (French pronunciation: [lanaʁs]; Occitan: La Narsa) is a commune in the Ardèche department in southern France.

== Geography ==
The village of Lanarce, situated along a busy road between Montélimar to Le Puy-en-Velay demonstrates the difficulty of Ardeche mountain life. Built more than 1000m above sea level, it is covered in snowdrifts and swamps, depending on the season. Lanarce has interesting volcanic geography, with bog-filled maars—low volcanic craters.

== Population ==
Historical population
Year	Pop.	±% p.a.
1968	377	—
1975	310	−2.76%
1982	280	−1.44%
1990	248	−1.51%
1999	199	−2.42%
2007	173	−1.73%
2012	158	−1.80%
2017	200	+4.83%
2023	212	+0.98%
Source: INSEE

== Local sites ==
- The Auberge de Peyrebeille, or Auberge rouge, an old inn now serving as a museum covering the many murders that took place in the first half of the 19th century. It remains more or less as it was in 1833, when Jean Rochette and Mr & Mrs Martin were executed. It is now surrounded by more modern buildings: a motel, a restaurant and a service station.
- The "ferme de Bourlatier" (in the commune of Saint-Andéol-de-Fourchades)

== See also ==
- Communes of the Ardèche department
