= Lessons in Conduct =

1946 film

- French film poster
- French: Leçon de conduite
- Directed by: Gilles Grangier
- Written by: Jean Halain; Georges Lacombe; Gaston Modot
- Produced by: André Hunebelle
- Starring: Odette Joyeux; Gilbert Gil; Jean Tissier
- Cinematography: Philippe Agostini
- Edited by: Jean Sacha
- Music by: Jean Marion
- Production company: PAC
- Distributed by: UFPC
- Release date: 29 May 1946
- Running time: 82 minutes
- Country: France
- Language: French

Lessons in Conduct (French: Leçon de conduite) is a 1946 French comedy film directed by Gilles Grangier and starring Odette Joyeux, Gilbert Gil and Jean Tissier. It was shot at the Cité Elgé studios in Paris. The film's sets were designed by the art director Paul-Louis Boutié.

== Synopsis ==
In provincial Grande the spoilt Micheline continually displays entitled behaviour and tries to steal the boyfriends of other girls. To teach her a lesson some locals led by Jacques stage a fake kidnapping and hold her in a nearby forest. Even then she still manages to impose her will on her captors. When real criminals then kidnap her for ransom, Jacques and his companions set out to rescue her.

== Main cast ==
- Odette Joyeux as Micheline
- Gilbert Gil as Jacques
- Jean Tissier as Frédo
- André Alerme as M. Granval
- Bernard La Jarrige as Roland
- Max Révol as Alexandre
- Max Dalban as Mario
- Anne-Marie Hunebelle
- Félix Claude
- Renée Vos as Danielle
- Pierre Magnier as M. Derlancourt
- Maurice Baquet as Jean
- Yves Deniaud as Angélo
