= Michel Peyramaure =

French writer (1922–2023)

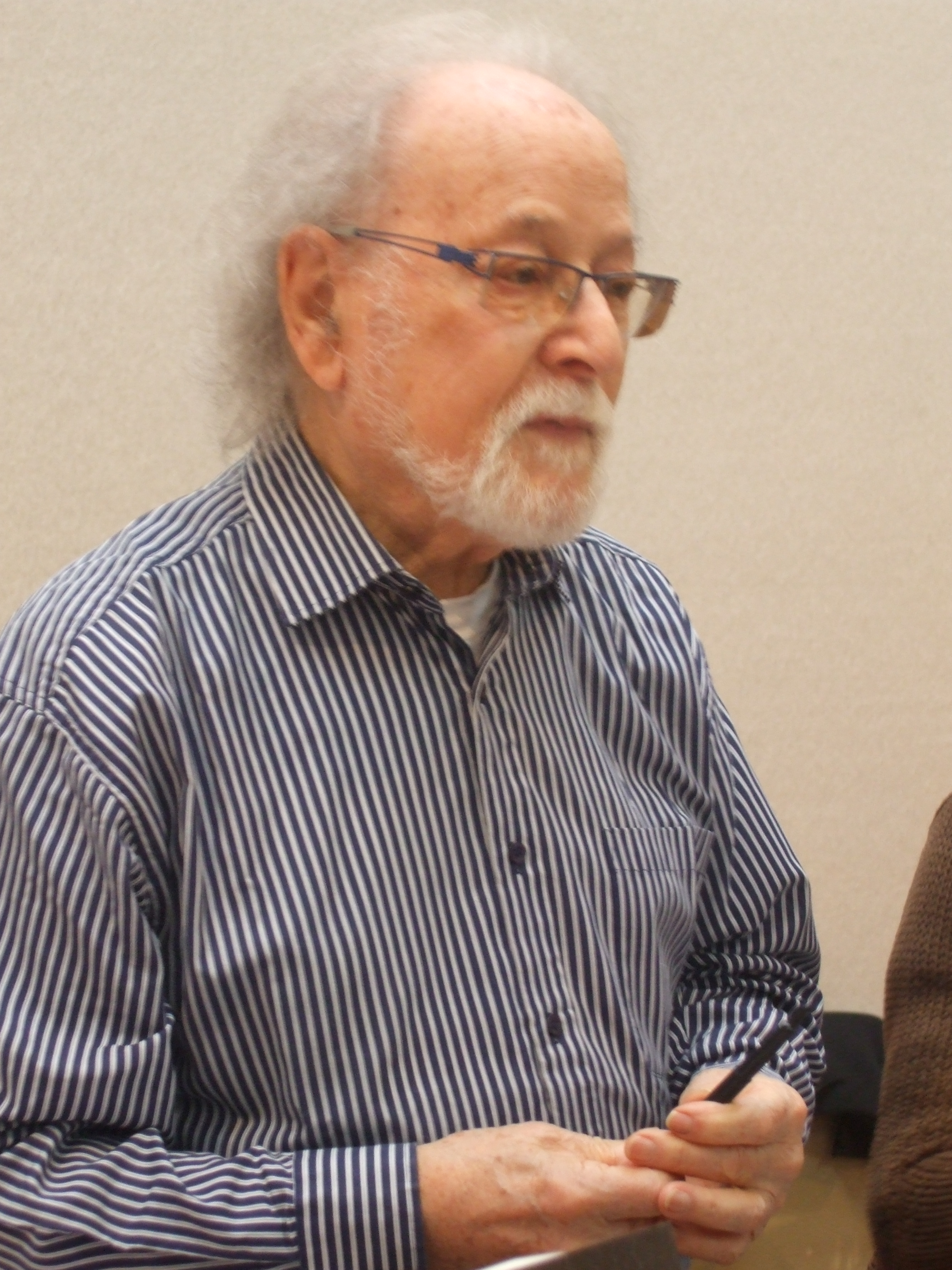
Michel Peyramaure

Michel Peyramaure (French pronunciation: [miʃɛl pɛʁamɔʁ]; 30 January 1922 – 11 March 2023) was a French writer. He received the 1979 Grand prix de littérature de la SGDL.

== Publications ==
- Paradis entre quatre murs, Robert Laffont, 1954
- Le Bal des ribauds, Robert Laffont, « Couleurs du temps passé », 1955; réédition, Les Monédières, 1983 ISBN 978-2-9034-3828-9
- Divine Cléopâtre, Robert Laffont, « Couleurs du temps passé », 1957
- Les Lions d'Aquitaine, Robert Laffont, 1957
- L’Aigle des deux royaumes (Aliénor d'Aquitaine), Robert Laffont, « Couleurs du temps passé », 1959
- Dieu m'attend à Médina, le roman d'Isabelle la Catholique, Robert Laffont, 1960
- La Fille des grandes plaines, Robert Laffont, « Bibliothèque pour tous », 1963
- Les Cendrillons de Monaco, Robert Laffont, « L' Amour et la couronne », 1964
- Les Dieux de plumes, Presses de la Cité, 1965
- La Vallée des mammouths, Robert Laffont, « Plein Vent » No. 10, 1966; réédition, Gallimard-Jeunesse, « Folio junior », No. 108, 1980
- Les Colosses de Carthage, Robert Laffont, « Plein Vent » No. 29, 1967; réédition, Pocket, septembre 1999 ISBN 978-2-2660-9198-5
- Cordillère interdite, Robert Laffont, « Plein Vent » No. 62, 1970
- Le Chevalier de paradis, Casterman, « La Palme d'or », 1971; réédition, Lucien Souny, juin 1991 ISBN 978-2-9052-6252-3
- Le Rétable, Robert Laffont, mars 1971; réédition sous le titre Le Retable, L. Souny, 1990
- L'Œil arraché, Robert Laffont, 1974
- L’Auberge de la mort : l'énigme de Peyrebeille, 1833 (l'histoire vraie de l'auberge sanglante à Peyrebeille), Éditions Pygmalion, « Bibliothèque infernale », 1976; réédition sous le titre L'Auberge rouge : l'énigme de Peyrebeille, 1833, Éditions Pygmalion, « Bibliothèque infernale », 2001
- Nous irons décrocher les nuages, Robert Laffont, « Plein Vent » No. 116, 1976
- La Passion Cathare :
  - Vol. 1 : Les Fils de l’orgueil, Robert Laffont, 1977 ISBN 978-2-2210-0124-0
  - Vol. 2 : Les Citadelles ardentes, Robert Laffont, 1978 ISBN 978-2-2210-0144-8
  - Vol. 3 : La Tête du dragon, Robert Laffont, 1978 ISBN 978-2-2210-0125-7
- Autour du Limousin, texte de Michel Peyramaure; lithographies originales de Jean-Baptiste Valadié, Plaisir du livre, 1977
- Sentiers et randonnées du Limousin, cartes exécutées par Michel Pluvinage, Fayard, 1979
- La Lumière et la Boue (roman de la guerre de Cent Ans)
  - Vol. 1 : Quand surgira l’étoile Absinthe, Robert Laffont, 1980 ISBN 978-2-2210-0442-5
  - Vol. 2 : L’Empire des fous, Robert Laffont, 1980 ISBN 978-2-2210-0575-0
  - Vol. 3 : Les Roses de fer, Robert Laffont, 1981 ISBN 978-2-2210-0681-8
- L'Orange de Noël, Robert Laffont, 1982 ISBN 978-2221-008478
- Le Printemps des pierres, Robert Laffont, février 1983 ISBN 978-2-2210-1119-5
- Les Montagnes du jour : monographie sentimentale des Monédières, Éditions les Monédières, 1983
- Les Empires de cendre (La conquête de la Gaule vue par César et un jeune grec intégré en pays Arvernes) :
  - Les Portes de Gergovie, Robert Laffont, décembre 1983 ISBN 978-2-2210-4250-2
  - La Chair et le Bronze, Robert Laffont, février 1985 ISBN 978-2-2210-4645-6
  - La Porte noire, Robert Laffont, février 1986 ISBN 978-2-2210-4982-2
- Amour du Limousin, photogr. de Bernard Tardien et Jean-François Amelot, Pierre Fanlac éditeur, 1986
- La Caverne magique, Robert Laffont, juin 1986 ISBN 978-2221-050286
- La Division maudite (roman-document sur la marche de l'armée allemande de Montauban au front de Normandie, par Tulle et Oradour-sur-Glane), Robert Laffont, 1987
- La Passion Béatrice (d'après le scénario original de Colo Tavernier O'Hagan), Robert Laffont, octobre 1987 ISBN 978-2-2210-5419-2
- Je suis Napoléon (roman jeunesse), Belfond, 1989
- Les Dames de Marsanges :
  - Vol. 1 : Les Dames de Marsanges, Robert Laffont, mai 1988 ISBN 978-2-2210-5602-8
  - Vol. 2 : La Montagne terrible, Robert Laffont, février 1989 ISBN 978-2-2210-5940-1
  - Vol. 3 : Demain, après l'orage, Robert Laffont, mars 1990 ISBN 978-2-2210-6734-5
- Napoléon : Chronique romanesque :
  - Vol. 1 : L’Étoile Bonaparte, Robert Laffont, 1991
  - Vol. 2 : L’Aigle et la Foudre, Robert Laffont, 1991
- Les Flammes du paradis, Robert Laffont, mai 1992 ISBN 978-2-2210-7404-6
- Les Tambours sauvages (roman sur les premiers colons français dans la colonie française de Canada), Presses de la Cité, 1992
- Le Beau Monde. Histoire d'Anna Labrousse, servante, Robert Laffont, janvier 1994 ISBN 2-7242-8125-X
- Les Demoiselles des écoles, Robert Laffont, 1994 ISBN 978-2-7242-8922-0
- Pacifique sud - Bougainville à Tahiti, Presse de la Cité, avril 1994 ISBN 978-2-2580-0097-1
- Martial Chabannes, gardien des ruines, Éditions Seghers, 1995
- Louisiana (l'épopée des premiers colons français de Louisiane), Presses de la Cité, 1996
- Un monde à sauver, Bartillat, 1996
- Cléopâtre, reine du Nil, Robert Laffont, mai 1997 ISBN 978-2-2210-8584-4
- Henri IV
  - Vol. 1 : L'Enfant roi de Navarre (+ appendice Despeches de guerre & d'amour du Béarnais), Robert Laffont, 1998
  - Vol. 2 : Ralliez-vous à mon panache blanc !, Robert Laffont, 1998
  - Vol. 3 : Les Amours, les Passions et la Gloire, Robert Laffont, 1998
- Suzanne Valadon :
  - Vol. 1 : Les Escaliers de Montmartre, Robert Laffont, 1998
  - Vol. 2 : Le Temps des ivresses, Robert Laffont, 1998
- Lavalette, grenadier d'Égypte, Robert Laffont, 1998 ISBN 978-2-2210-8733-6
- La Tour des anges - Le palais des papes en Avignon, Robert Laffont, 1998
- La Cabane aux fées et autres histoires mystérieuses, Éditions du Rocher, « Mystères des provinces », 1999
- Jeanne d'Arc
  - Vol. 1 : Et Dieu donnera la victoire, Robert Laffont, 1999
  - Vol. 2 : La Couronne de feu, Robert Laffont, 1999
- Vu du clocher, Bartillat, 1999
- Les Chiens sauvages, Robert Laffont, 2000
- Le Roman des Croisades :
  - La Croix et le Royaume, Robert Laffont, 2001
  - Les Étendards du Temple, Robert Laffont, 2001
- Le Roman de Catherine de Médicis, Presse de la Cité, 2002
- La Divine - Le Roman de Sarah Bernhardt, Robert Laffont, mai 2002
- Le Bonheur des Charmettes, éditions de la Table Ronde, 2002; réédition, éditions de Borée, octobre 2008 (jeunesse de Jean-Jacques Rousseau)
- Fille de la colère. Le Roman de Louise Michel, Robert Laffont, janvier 2003
- Balades des chemins creux, nouvelles, éditions Anne Carrère, 2003
- Les Bals de Versailles, Robert Laffont, décembre 2003 (sur les amours de Louis XIV)
- Un château rose en Corrèze, Presses de la Cité, « Romans Terres de France », 2003
- Le Pays Cathare en aquarelles, Ouest-France, 2003 livre touristique sur le Languedoc-Roussillon
- Soupes d'orties, Anne Carrière, 2003
- Les Grandes Falaises (roman de la Préhistoire), Presses de la Cité, 2003
- Les Amants maudits - George Sand, Musset, Chopin, Robert Laffont, 2004
- Les Fleuves de Babylone, Presses de la Cité, novembre 2005
- Les Fêtes galantes, Robert Laffont, 2005
- Le Parc-aux-Cerfs, Robert Laffont, 2005
- Le Temps des moussons, Presses de la Cité, 2006 ISBN 2-258-07162-3
- Les Prisonniers de Cabrera- L'Exil forcé des soldats de Napoléon
- Les Trois Bandits :
  - Vol. 1 : Cartouche, Robert Laffont, mai 2006 ISBN 978-2-2211-0670-9
  - Vol. 2 : Mandrin, Robert Laffont, février 2007 ISBN 978-2-2211-0689-1
  - Vol. 3 : Vidocq, Robert Laffont, mai 2007 ISBN 978-2-2211-0690-7
- Le Chat et la Plume, La Lauze, octobre 2007 ISBN 978-2-3524-9022-7
- La Petite Danseuse de Degas, Paris, Bartillat, 2007 ISBN 978-2-8410-0399-0
- La Vallée endormie Robert Laffont, 2007
- Les Femmes de la Révolution :
  - Vol. 1 : La Reine de Paris - Le Roman de Madame Tallien, Robert Laffont, 2008
  - Vol. 2 : L’Ange de la paix - Le Roman d'Olympe de Gouges, Robert Laffont, novembre 2008
  - Vol. 3 : Les Grandes Libertines - Le Roman de Sophie Arnould et Françoise Raucourt, Robert Laffont, 2009
- Conditionnel passé, texte in Inconnues corréziennes, résonance d'écrivains, ouvrage collectif, éditions Libel, 2009
- Les Villes du silence - Le Roman des Étrusques, Calmann-Lévy, mai 2010 ISBN 978-2-7021-4108-3
- Le Bal des célibataires (suite de L'Orange de Noël, ce roman a été écrit postérieurement au téléfilm éponyme et s'est librement inspiré de son scénario original).
- Batailles en Margeride, éditions du Rouergue, mars 2005 (sur les maquis de la Résistance en Limousin)
- Le Château de la chimère, éditions de la Table ronde, 2009
- La Confession impériale, Robert Laffont, 2010 ISBN 978-2-221-11642-5
- Tempête sur le Mexique, Calmann-Lévy, 2011 ISBN 978-2-7021-4176-2
- Un vent de paradis - Le Roman des troubadours, NIL, 2011 ISBN 978-2-2211-2604-2
- Mourir pour Saragosse, Calmann-Lévy, 2012 ISBN 978-2-7021-4285-1
- Beaux Nuages du soir, Robert Laffont, 2012 ISBN 978-2-221-13105-3
- Les Folies de la duchesse d’Abrantès, Calmann-Lévy, 2013 ISBN 978-2-7021-4440-4
- Les Rivales : Lucrèce Borgia et Isabelle d'Este, Robert Laffont, 2014 ISBN 978-2-2211-4668-2
- La Maison des tourbières, Calmann-Lévy, 2015 ISBN 978-2-7021-5732-9
- Un château rose en Corrèze, Presse de la Cité, « Terres de France », 2003 et 2011
- Le Pays du bel espoir, Presse de la Cité, 2004
- Les Roses noires de Saint-Domingue, Presse de la Cité, « Sud lointain », 2007 ISBN 978-2-2580-7420-0
- La Porte du non-retour, Presse de la Cité, 2008
- Les Épées de feu, Robert Laffont, 2013 ISBN 978-2-2211-3981-3
- L’Orpheline de la forêt Barade, Calmann-Lévy, 2014
- Trois Cavaliers dans la forêt, Ouest-France, 2017
- Les Tentes noires, Calmann-Lévy, septembre 2018
- Le Sabre de l’Empire, Robert Laffont, 2015 ISBN 978-2-2211-8922-1
- La Non Pareille, Calmann-Lévy, 2019 ISBN 978-2-7021-6696-3
- La Scandaleuse, Calmann-Lévy, 2020 ISBN 978-2-7021-6894-3
- La Vie passionnée : le roman de Marceline Desbordes-Valmore, Calmann-Lévy, 2021 ISBN 978-2-7021-8409-7
- Inventaire avant fermeture : vivre en province, Calmann-Lévy, 2021 ISBN 978-2-7021-8404-2
