= Good Lord Without Confession =

1953 film

- Directed by: Claude Autant-Lara
- Written by: Claude Autant-Lara; Roland Laudenbach; Ghislaine Autant-Lara
- Based on: Monsieur Dupont est mort by Paul Vialar
- Produced by: Joseph Bercholz
- Starring: Danielle Darrieux; Henri Vilbert; Claude Laydu
- Cinematography: André Bac
- Edited by: Madeleine Gug
- Music by: René Cloërec
- Production company: Les Films Gibé
- Distributed by: Pathé Consortium Cinéma
- Release date: 4 September 1953
- Running time: 105 minutes
- Country: France
- Language: French

Good Lord Without Confession (French: Le Bon Dieu sans confession) is a 1953 French drama film directed by Claude Autant-Lara and starring Danielle Darrieux, Henri Vilbert and Claude Laydu. It was shot at the Francoeur Studios in Paris. The film's sets were designed by the art director Max Douy. The film premiered at the Venice Film Festival in September 1953 and went on general release in France the following month. Henri Vilbert won the Volpi Cup for Best Actor for his performance.

== Synopsis ==
At the funeral of François Dupont, his various associates walk in the procession including his wife, children, business partner and mistress Janine. The various characters recall their experiences with the deceased. In flashback we see Janine's relationship with Dupont, and how she had manipulated and exploited him through the turbulent years of the Occupation and Liberation. Ultimately her machinations fail and she loses the man she really loves, her husband Maurice.

== Cast ==
- Danielle Darrieux as Janine Fréjoul
- Henri Vilbert as François Dupont
- Claude Laydu as Roland Dupont
- Ivan Desny as Maurice Fréjoul
- Grégoire Aslan as Varesco
- Myno Burney as Marie Dupont
- Isabelle Pia as Denise Dupont
- Jean Dunot as Marfoisse
- Julien Carette as Eugène
- Claude Berri as Le fils d'Eugène
- Georges Bever as Albert, le domestique
- Jo Dest as Weber
- Michel Dumur as Roland enfant
- Marie-Chantal Fefert as Denise enfant
- Marcelle Féry as La concierge
- René Lacourt as Le bistrotier
- Michel Le Royer as Thierry, le petit ami de Denise
- Madeleine Suffel as La marchande des quatre saisons

== Bibliography ==
- Biggs, Melissa E. French films, 1945-1993: a critical filmography of the 400 most important releases. McFarland & Company, 1996.
- Walker-Morrison, Deborah. Classic French Noir: Gender and the Cinema of Fatal Desire. Bloomsbury Publishing, 2020.
