= Between Love and Duty =

1960 film

- Directed by: Claude Autant-Lara
- Written by: René Hardy; Albert Husson; Jacques Rémy; Ghislaine Autant-Lara
- Based on: Terre inhumaine by François de Curel
- Produced by: Marcello Danon; Yves Laplanche; Ray Ventura
- Starring: Laurent Terzieff; Erika Remberg; Horst Frank; Gert Fröbe
- Cinematography: Jacques Natteau
- Edited by: Madeleine Gug
- Music by: René Cloërec
- Production companies: Da.Ma. Cinematografica; Hoche Productions
- Distributed by: Cocinor
- Release date: 3 August 1960
- Running time: 95 minutes
- Countries: France; Italy
- Language: French

Between Love and Duty (French: Le bois des amants, Italian: Il bosco degli amanti) is a 1960 French-Italian war drama film directed by Claude Autant-Lara and starring Laurent Terzieff, Erika Remberg, Horst Frank and Gert Fröbe. Set during the Second World War, it draws inspiration from the plot of the much older play Terre inhumaine by François de Curel. It was shot at the Billancourt Studios in Paris and extensively on location around Finistère. The film's sets were designed by the art director Max Douy.

== Synopsis ==
In 1943 in Brittany during the German Occupation, Hertha von Stauffen arrives to stay with her husband, a colonel in the Germany Arm. However while her husband is away, she encounters Charles Parisot, a local French Resistance operative, who is on a mission to guide British RAF bombers for a raid. The two quickly fall in love, but it is a doomed relationship in the midst of the war.

== Cast ==
- Laurent Terzieff as Charles Parisot
- Erika Remberg as Hertha von Stauffen
- Horst Frank as Le colonel von Stauffen
- Françoise Rosay as Madame Parisot
- Gert Fröbe as Le général
- Lutz Gabor as Le lieutenant Müller
- Richard Larke as Le lieutenant-instructeur de la R.A.F.
- Claude Vernier as Un soldat allemand
- Monique Bertho as Jeannette
- Hans Verner as L'interprète/Interpreter
- Marcel Bernier as Un soldat allemand
- Albert Daumergue as Le sommelier
- Gottfried John as Le téléphoniste
- Claude Farell as Unknown role

== Bibliography ==
- Gili, Jean A. & Tassone, Aldo. Parigi-Roma: 50 anni di coproduzioni italo-francesi (1945-1995). Editrice Il castoro, 1995.
- Goble, Alan. The Complete Index to Literary Sources in Film. Walter de Gruyter, 1999.
- Rège, Philippe. Encyclopedia of French Film Directors, Volume 1. Scarecrow Press, 2009.
