= Gigolo (1951 film) =

1951 film

- Directed by: Roger Richebé
- Written by: Jean Aurenche; Maurice Blondeau
- Based on: Gibier de potence by Jean-Louis Curtis
- Produced by: Roger Richebé
- Starring: Arletty; Georges Marchal; Nicole Courcel
- Cinematography: Philippe Agostini
- Edited by: Yvonne Martin
- Music by: Henri Verdun
- Production company: Films Roger Richebé
- Distributed by: Films Roger Richebé
- Release date: 8 November 1951
- Running time: 106 minutes
- Country: France
- Language: French

Gigolo or Gallows Bird (French: Gibier de potence) is a 1951 French drama film directed by Roger Richebé and starring Arletty, Georges Marchal and Nicole Courcel. It is based on the 1949 novel of the same title by Jean-Louis Curtis. It was shot at the Neuilly Studios in Paris. The film's sets were designed by the art director Jacques Krauss.

== Synopsis ==
In 1930s Paris Marceau leaves an orphanage and falls under the influence of Alice, an older woman who introduces him to the world of vice until he has become a gigolo. He is called up to serve during the Second World War and is then held as a prisoner of war. Released and returning to the capital he wishes to live an honest life helped by Dominique a kind young woman he has met. However, Alice refuses to let him out of her clutches and is ready to go so far as to kill him.

== Cast ==
- Arletty as Madame Alice
- Georges Marchal as Marceau Le Guern
- Nicole Courcel as Dominique D'Arjelouve
- André Carnège as Le frère Benedict
- Renée Cosima as Ginette
- Robert Dalban as Le boucher
- Allain Dhurtal as Philippe D'Arjelouve
- Pierre Dux as Le père Quentin
- Mona Goya as Henriette
- Simone Michels as La bouchère
- Pierre Morin as Le commissaire
- Marcel Mouloudji as Ernest
- Maurice Nasil as Le notaire Comarieu
- Pierre Palau as Monsieur Paul
- Simone Paris as Madame Dancourt
- Georges Paulais as Le frère Bartholomé
- Maria Ventura as Consuelo

== Bibliography ==
- Goble, Alan. The Complete Index to Literary Sources in Film. Walter de Gruyter, 1999.
- Rège, Philippe. Encyclopedia of French Film Directors, Volume 1. Scarecrow Press, 2009.
