= Chiffon's Wedding =

1942 film

- Directed by: Claude Autant-Lara
- Written by: Jean Aurenche; Maurice Blondeau
- Based on: Chiffon's Wedding by Sibylle Riqueti de Mirabeau
- Produced by: Pierre Guerlais
- Starring: Odette Joyeux; André Luguet; Jacques Dumesnil
- Cinematography: Philippe Agostini; Jean Isnard
- Edited by: Raymond Lamy
- Music by: Roger Desormière
- Production company: Industrie Cinématographique
- Distributed by: Sirius Films
- Release date: 6 August 1942
- Running time: 103 minutes
- Country: France
- Language: French

Chiffon's Wedding (French: Le mariage de Chiffon) is a 1942 French historical comedy film directed by Claude Autant-Lara and starring Odette Joyeux, André Luguet and Jacques Dumesnil. It is based on the 1894 novel of the same title by Sibylle Riqueti de Mirabeau. The film's sets were designed by the art director Jacques Krauss.

== Cast ==
- Odette Joyeux as Corysande dite Chiffon
- André Luguet as Le duc d'Aubières
- Jacques Dumesnil as Marc de Bray
- Suzanne Dantès as La comtesse de Bray
- Louis Seigner as Philippe de Bray
- Georges Vitray as Van Doren
- Monette Dinay as Alice de Liron
- Bernard Blier as Le garçon d'hôtel
- Marthe Mellot as La marchande de journaux de la gare
- Richard Francoeur as Léon
- Pierre Jourdan as L'officier
- France Ellys as Sophie
- Yvonne Yma as Mathilde - la cuisinière
- Raymond Bussières as Marcel Férez
- Robert Le Vigan as Maître Blondin - l'huissier
- Pierre Larquey as Jean

== Bibliography ==
- Rège, Philippe. Encyclopedia of French Film Directors, Volume 1. Scarecrow Press, 2009.
- Siclier, Jacques. La France de Pétain et son cinéma. H. Veyrier, 1981.
- Williams, Alan L. Republic of Images: A History of French Filmmaking. Harvard University Press, 1992.
