= Angels of Sin =

- Directed by: Robert Bresson
- Written by: Robert Bresson; Raymond Léopold Bruckberger; Jean Giraudoux
- Produced by: Roger Richebé
- Starring: Renée Faure; Jany Holt
- Cinematography: Philippe Agostini
- Edited by: Yvonne Martin
- Music by: Jean-Jacques Grünenwald
- Distributed by: Synops
- Release date: 23 June 1943
- Running time: 80 minutes; 86 minutes (restored version)
- Country: France
- Language: French

Angels of Sin (French: Les Anges du péché) is a 1943 French film directed by Robert Bresson, in his feature directorial debut. Made in 1943, nine years after his comedy short Public Affairs, it was Bresson's only film released during the German occupation of France. Working titles included Bethany, and Bresson's favored title The Exchange, but producers felt these were not sensational enough.

This film was made with a cast of professional actors, an aspect it shares with Bresson's next film, Les Dames du Bois de Boulogne, which would be his last done that way. Though usually seen as being the most "conventional" of Bresson's features, the religious subject matter and the directness of the film's style are seen by many as auspicious of the director's later work.

Bresson collaborated on the film's screenplay with Raymond Leopold Bruckberger, a Dominican priest, and the noted dramatist Jean Giraudoux, who received top billing on the film's posters above the then-unknown Bresson.

== Synopsis ==
Anne-Marie (Renée Faure), a well–off young woman, decides to become a nun, joining a convent that rehabilitates female prisoners. Through their program, she meets a woman named Thérèse (Jany Holt) who refuses any help because she says she was innocent of the crime for which she was convicted. After being released from prison, Thérèse murders the man she feels is responsible for her imprisonment and comes to seek sanctuary from the law in the convent. Anne-Marie clashes with her sisters and elders over her zealousness to reform Thérèse, who manipulates and antagonizes her.

== Cast ==
- Renée Faure as Anne-Marie Lamaury
- Jany Holt as Thérèse
- Sylvie as La prieure
- Mila Parély as Madeleine
- Marie-Hélène Dasté as Mère Saint-Jean
- Yolande Laffon as Madame Lamaury
- Paula Dehelly as Mère Dominique
- Silvia Monfort as Agnès
- Gilberte Terbois as Soeur Marie-Josèphe
- Louis Seigner as Le directeur de la prison
- Georges Colin as Le chef de la P.J.
- Geneviève Morel as Soeur Berthe
- Christiane Barry as Soeur Blaise
- Jean Morel as L'inspecteur de police

== Bressonian trademarks ==
Though fairly conventional for its time in its approach to narrative filmmaking, Angels of Sin nonetheless contains elements which would later become common in Bresson's work, including a featuring of ellipsis: the shop owner is hardly visible throughout a sequence in which Thérèse buys a gun; there is also little context around the relationship of Thérèse and the man she murders (who, when shot, is only shown in silhouette). Additionally, the film has a prison setting, which would recur in the films A Man Escaped (1956), Pickpocket (1959), The Trial of Joan of Arc (1962), and L'Argent (1983). Lastly, the film ends with a shot of crossed hands being handcuffed: this form of close-up on hands became one of Bresson's most famous stylistic trademarks, and this particular arrangement of the cuffed hands is repeated in the aforementioned The Trial of Joan of Arc.

Though not a Bressonian trademark itself, the film also utilizes more fades to black than is common in other French films of the time, showing an early experimentation with film editing.
