= Élisa (1957 film) =

1957 film

- Directed by: Roger Richebé
- Written by: Roger Richebé
- Based on: La Fille Elisa by Edmond de Goncourt
- Produced by: Roger Richebé
- Starring: Dany Carrel; Serge Reggiani; Valentine Tessier
- Cinematography: Roger Hubert
- Edited by: Yvonne Martin
- Music by: Henri Verdun
- Production company: Les Films Roger Richebé
- Distributed by: Les Films Roger Richebé
- Release date: 8 March 1957
- Running time: 90 minutes
- Country: France
- Language: French

Élisa is a 1957 French historical drama film directed by Roger Richebé and starring Dany Carrel, Serge Reggiani and Valentine Tessier. It is based on a novel by Edmond de Goncourt. It was shot in Eastmancolor. The film's sets were designed by the art director Jacques Krauss.

== Cast ==
- Dany Carrel as Élisa
- Serge Reggiani as Bernard Voisin
- Valentine Tessier as Mme. Irma
- Marthe Mercadier as Mme Clotilde
- Georges Baconnet as Le commissaire
- Laurence Badie as Une fille emprisonnée
- Guy Bertil as Le jeune homme
- Annie Berval as Enerstine
- Irène Bréor as Divine
- Anne Béranger as Alexandrine
- Daniel Ceccaldi as Le coiffeur
- Georges Chamarat as Le docteur de la maision de correction
- Marie-Hélène Dasté as La mère de Guy
- Marpessa Dawn as La négresse
- Michel Etcheverry as Le président
- Micheline Gary as Gobe Lune
- Claude Godard as Lina
- Raymond Gérôme as Villedieu
- Bernard Lajarrige as M. Granier
- Claude Mauduyt as Caroline
- Lucien Raimbourg as Bardy
- Lysiane Rey as Clairette
- Fernand Sardou as M. Alfred

== Bibliography ==
- Goble, Alan. The Complete Index to Literary Sources in Film. Walter de Gruyter, 1999.
- Rège, Philippe. Encyclopedia of French Film Directors, Volume 1. Scarecrow Press, 2009. ISBN 978-0-8108-6939-4
