= Jacques Krauss =

French art director

- Born: 21 October 1900; Paris, France
- Died: 8 June 1957 (aged 56); Paris, France
- Occupation: Art director
- Years active: 1934–1957
- Father: Henry Krauss

Jacques Krauss (21 October 1900 – 8 June 1957) was a French art director. He had a notable influence on the visual look of French poetic realist films before the Second World War, due to his work with Julien Duvivier.

He was born in Paris, the son of the actor Henry Krauss.

== Selected filmography ==
- If I Were Boss (1934)
- Maria Chapdelaine (1934)
- A Rare Bird (1935)
- Thirteen Days of Love (1935)
- La Bandera (1935)
- They Were Five (1936)
- Claudine at School (1937)
- The Man of the Hour (1937)
- Pépé le Moko (1937)
- Woman of Malacca (1937)
- Another World (1937)
- A Woman of No Importance (1937)
- The Courier of Lyon (1937)
- The Curtain Rises (1938)
- Final Accord (1938)
- The End of the Day (1939)
- The Phantom Carriage (1939)
- Madame Sans-Gêne (1941)
- Monsieur La Souris (1942)
- Chiffon's Wedding (1942)
- Love Letters (1942)
- Romance for Three (1942)
- The Phantom Baron (1943)
- Sylvie and the Ghost (1946)
- Captain Blomet (1947)
- The Fugitive (1947)
- The Adventures of Casanova (1947)
- Monseigneur (1949)
- Du Guesclin (1949)
- Darling Caroline (1951)
- Gigolo (1951)
- A Caprice of Darling Caroline (1953)
- Caroline and the Rebels (1955)
- Élisa (1957)

== Bibliography ==
- Dudley Andrew. Mists of Regret: Culture and Sensibility in Classic French Film. Princeton University Press, 1995.
