= Max Douy =

French art director (1913-2007)

- Born: 20 June 1913; Issy-les-Moulineaux, France
- Died: 2 July 2007 (aged 94); Nogent-sur-Marne, France
- Occupation: Art director
- Years active: 1932 - 1983 (film)

Max Douy (June 20, 1913 – July 2, 2007) was a French art director.

== Selected filmography ==
- The Rules of the Game (1939)
- There's No Tomorrow (1939)
- The Trump Card (1942)
- Goodbye Leonard (1943)
- Paris Frills (1945)
- Pétrus (1946)
- The Perfume of the Lady in Black (1949)
- Without Leaving an Address (1951)
- Matrimonial Agency (1952)
- Good Lord Without Confession (1953)
- Between Love and Duty (1960)
- A Woman in White (1965)
- Gloria (1977)
- Moonraker (1979)
- The Roaring Forties (1982)

== Bibliography ==
- Hayward, Susan. French Costume Drama of the 1950s: Fashioning Politics in Film. Intellect Books, 2010.
