= Odette Joyeux =

French actress, playwright and novelist

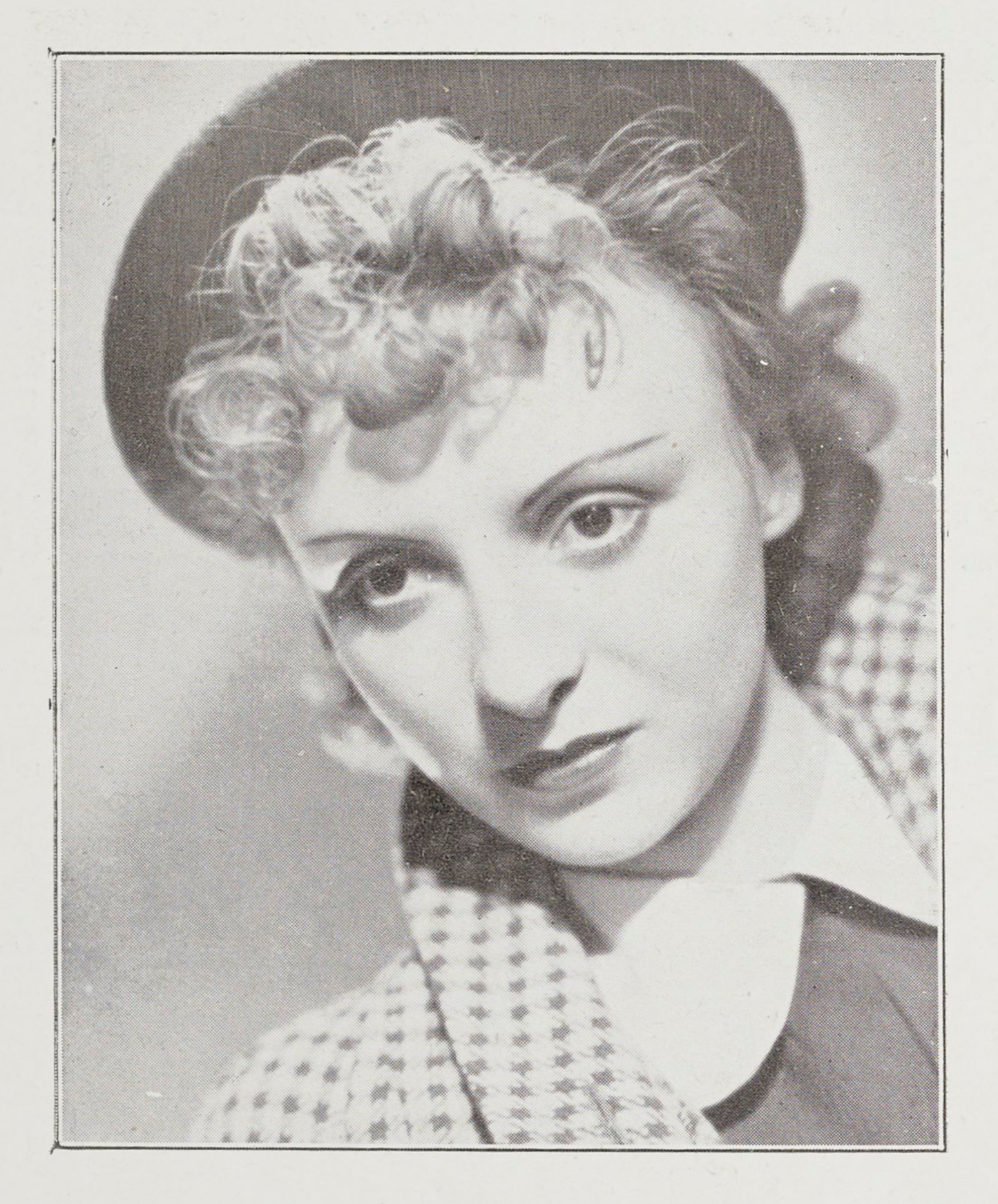
- Born: 5 December 1914; Paris, France
- Died: 26 August 2000 (aged 85); Grimaud, Var, Provence-Alpes-Côte d'Azur, France
- Occupations: Actress, Writer
- Years active: 1930–1973 (Film & TV); 1951–1984 (screenwriter)
- Spouses: Pierre Brasseur (m. 1935; div. 1945) Philippe Agostini (m. 1958–2000)

Odette Joyeux (5 December 1914 – 26 August 2000) was a French actress, playwright and novelist.

== Biography ==
She was born in Paris, where she studied dance at the Paris Opera Ballet before taking the stage. Joyeux started her film career in 1931. Her first notable film was Marc Allégret's Entrée des artistes (1938). During the 1940s she established herself as one of France's most popular cinema actresses; however, she made few film appearances after the 1950s.

Joyeux is the author of some plays and essays on dance as well as a book on the life of inventor Nicéphore Niépce. She also wrote two novels aimed to inspire dance: L'Âge heureux (which was adapted to a television series) and Côté jardin. Additionally, Joyeux wrote The Bride Is Much Too Beautiful (1956) (adapted to film).

She married actor Pierre Brasseur from 1935 until their divorce in 1945, by whom she had one child, Claude Brasseur, who is the father of Alexandre Brasseur.

In 1958 she married director Philippe Agostini. They remained married until her death in Grimaud, Var, Provence-Alpes-Côte d'Azur, France from stroke at age 85.

== Partial filmography ==
- Une femme a menti (1930)
- Le secret du docteur (1930) - Suzy, la bonne
- Jean de la Lune (1931) - Figurante (uncredited)
- Le chien jaune (1932) - (uncredited)
- Lake of Ladies (1934) - Carla Lyssenhop
- Le chant de l'amour (1935) - Tote
- Valse éternelle (1936) - Sophie
- Hélène (1936) - Françoise
- Une femme qui se partage (1937) - Léa
- Trois artilleurs au pensionnat (1937) - Micheline
- La Glu (1938) - Naïk
- Grisou (1938) - Madeleine
- Youth in Revolt (1938) - Zizi
- The Curtain Rises (1938) - Coecilia
- Notre-Dame de la Mouise (1941) - La môme
- Le Lit à colonnes (1942) - Marie-Dorée
- Chiffon's Wedding (1942) - Corysande dite Chiffon
- Love Letters (1942) - Zélie Fontaine
- The Phantom Baron (1943) - Elfy de Saint-Hélié
- Love Story (1943) - Douce
- Les Petites du quai aux fleurs (1944) - Rosine Grimaud
- Échec au roy (1945) - Jeannette de Pincret
- Sylvie and the Ghost (1946) - Sylvie
- Messieurs Ludovic (1946) - Anne-Marie Vermeulen
- Lessons in Conduct (1946) - Micheline
- Passionnelle (1947) - Thérèse de Marsannes
- Scandal (1948) - Cécilia
- Dernière heure, édition spéciale (1949) - Andrée Coche
- Summer Storm (1949) - Marie-Blanche
- La Ronde (1950) - Anna, the Grisette
- If Paris Were Told to Us (1956) - La Passementière
- Love Is at Stake (1957, TV Movie) - Récitante (voice)
- A Golden Widow (1969, screenwriter)

== Honours ==
She was made Chevalier (Knight) of the Légion d'honneur on 29 November 1989, and promoted to Officier (Officer) in 1998.

She was made Officier (Officer) of the Ordre national du Mérite in 1994.
