= La Fiancée des ténèbres =

1945 film

La Fiancée des tenèbres
- Film poster
- Directed by: Serge de Poligny
- Written by: Gaston Bonheur; Serge de Poligny; Jean Anouilh (uncredited); Henri Calef (uncredited)
- Based on: a short story by Gaston Bonheur
- Starring: Pierre Richard-Willm; Jany Holt
- Cinematography: Roger Hubert
- Edited by: Jean Feyte
- Music by: Marcel Mirouze
- Color process: Black and white
- Production company: Eclair-Journal
- Distributed by: Union Française de Production Cinématographique; Cinédis; Gaumont
- Release date: 22 March 1945
- Running time: 92 minutes (2019 Blu-ray restoration)
- Country: France
- Language: French

La Fiancée des ténèbres ("the fiancée of darkness") is a 1945 French film directed by Serge de Poligny and starring Pierre Richard-Willm and Jany Holt. It was one of a small number of films in the fantastique genre made during the German occupation of France. Although filmed in 1944, its completion was delayed by the Liberation and it was not shown until 1945. The film is set in the city of Carcassonne in south-west France.

== Synopsis ==
Roland Samblanca, a pianist and composer, returns with his family to present-day Carcassonne, his native town, in search of inspiration for his music. Roaming through the old mediaeval town he encounters Sylvie, a mysterious young woman who was adopted as an orphaned child by M. Toulzac, a former teacher who now uses a wheelchair. Toulzac secretly maintains the cult of the Cathar or Albigensian religion, which was eradicated in Carcassonne by the Albigensian Crusade in the 13th century, and he sees in Sylvie someone predestined to rediscover the sanctuary of the Cathars and to resume their rites. Sylvie and Roland meet again and feel a growing attraction to each other, but Sylvie believes she is accursed in love because two previous boyfriends have met sudden deaths.

After spending an idyllic day with Roland, Sylvie decides to defy her destiny and run away with him. Sylvie goes to Mlle Perdrière, a Cathar sympathiser, to persuade her to look after M. Toulzac in her stead, but Mlle Perdrière is taken ill and drops dead. Sylvie returns to Toulzac and agrees to descend into a secret tunnel whose entrance has been discovered in his garden. She finds herself in the subterranean cathedral of the Albigensians, lost for centuries, and she begins to perform their ancient rites. Roland has followed her underground and now declares his love for her. The cathedral starts to collapse around them, and Roland and Sylvie narrowly escape into a dreamlike landscape where they spend some hours together. A storm reminds Sylvie of her 'curse' and she leaves while Roland sleeps. When he returns to Carcassonne, Roland visits Toulzac, only to be told that he has died and Sylvie has gone away. Roland returns to his family and resumes his composition at the piano. In the darkness outside, Sylvie stops to look at him through his lighted window, and then continues her way to the railway station.

== Cast ==
- Pierre Richard-Willm as Roland Samblanca
- Jany Holt as Sylvie
- Simone Valère as Dominique
- Édouard Delmont as M. Toulzac
- Line Noro as Mlle Perdrières
- Fernand Charpin as Fontvieille
- Anne Belval as Marie-Claude
- Pierre Palau as the photographer
- Robert Dhéry as the innkeeper of Tournebelle
- Gaston Gabaroche as Éloi

== Production ==
The film was based on a short story, La mort ne reçoit que sur rendez-vous ("Death only receives by appointment"), by Gaston Bonheur, published in Paris-soir (Toulouse) in 1943. Bonheur and the director Serge de Poligny made the screen adaptation with contributions by Henri Calef (in hiding because of his Jewish origins) and Jean Anouilh (who wrote the love-scene on the ramparts of Carcassonne).

It is a rare example of a film inspired by the thought and culture of the Cathars in the south-west of France. The writer Gaston Bonheur was born in the Aude department and he learned the Occitan language as a child. Another native of the region who worked on the film was the composer Marcel Mirouze who wrote the score (and published it as his Symphonie albigeoise). As well as drawing on the religion and history of Carcassonne and the Cathars in the 13th century, the film's central 'fantasy' is to suppose that the Cathar faith has been secretly preserved into the 20th century by a small band of devotees who seek and predict its revival. The confrontation between the mediaeval world and modern reality is a recurrent theme in both the story and the visual style (the opening shot juxtaposes the old and new towns of Carcassonne). Further contrasts of tone are introduced: romance, in the ill-fated love-affair, and satire, in the depiction of the petite bourgeoisie of southern France.

Filming of exteriors began in March 1944 and lasted for four weeks. For security reasons it was sometimes done under close supervision by the German army which was occupying Carcassonne at that time. (In the scene on a river barge, it was a German officer who fired the revolver shot for the recording.) Interiors were then filmed in Paris at the Saint-Maurice studios, where frequent electricity cuts hampered progress. The editing also proved complicated and completion of the film was interrupted by the Liberation of France in summer 1944. The release was consequently delayed until March 1945.

== Reception ==
By the time the film came out, the escapist mood of the occupation years in France had changed and films about war and resistance were now mainly in vogue. The unusual and original nature of the themes of La Fiancée des ténèbres, at a time when there was little knowledge of Catharism, and its disconcerting contrasts of tone meant that it was greeted with widespread incomprehension by both audiences and critics. The absence of any accompanying publicity campaign further contributed to its rapid dismissal. The film was revived in 1968 by the film historian Marcel Oms, and it attracted further interest in subsequent decades in the context of local studies. In 1975 the journal Les Cahiers de la cinémathèque (published in Perpignan) devoted an issue to the director Serge de Poligny. It included this assessment of La Fiancée des ténèbres:

In the history of French cinema there is a film which is universally regarded today as the first and only one to have been inspired by the Cathars. Greeted with sneers at the time of its release amid general incomprehension, on account of the labyrinthine complexity of a screenplay loaded with cultural references; admired for the formal perfection of its imagery, today La Fiancée des ténèbres surprises and fascinates the young generations of spectators who are more aware of questions of the irrational and also more receptive to a narrative which breaks with the over-literary conventions of 1930s cinema.
