= Serge de Poligny =

French film director (born 1903)

- Born: René Serge Quirot de Poligny; 14 April 1903; Paris, France
- Died: 23 March 1983 (aged 79); Saint-Cloud, Paris, France
- Occupations: Film director, screenwriter
- Years active: 1931–1955

Serge de Poligny (14 April 1903–23 March 1983) was a French screenwriter and film director.

== Career ==
Serge de Poligny was born in Paris in 1903. He studied art at the École des Beaux-Arts in the class of the painter Maurice Denis. In 1925 he joined the French subsidiary of the Paramount film company as a set-designer and painter, and soon took on the role of an assistant director. With the arrival of sound films, he took a job with UFA studios in Germany, supervising the French-language versions of films which were made in parallel with their German originals.

Serge de Poligny's first significant film as a director in France was an adaptation of Colette's novel Claudine à l'école in 1937. During the German Occupation in the 1940s, he made two films which have been seen as significant contributions to the genre of fantastique in the cinema. For Le Baron fantôme (1943) he worked with Jean Cocteau on the film's dialogue (Cocteau also acted in the title role), and Christian Dior designed the costumes. De Poligny said that he got the idea for it in an old magic book. His next film, La Fiancée des ténèbres (1945), was based on an old Cathar legend. His film career concluded in the mid-1950s, and he then devoted himself to the production of large-scale live shows, such as the commemorations of the Liberation of Paris (1964 & 1965); the Nuits de l'armée, and horse-riding shows like the Fêtes mondiales du cheval.

== Personal life ==
In 1932 de Poligny married Irène Sachse and they were divorced in 1946. In 1949 he married Yolande Mazuc. Serge de Poligny died at Saint-Cloud on 23 March 1983.

== Selected filmography ==
Director

Year	Title	English title	Notes
1932	Les As du turf	Aces of the Turf	
1932	Vous serez ma femme	You Will Be My Wife	French language version of Der Frechdachs, made in Germany.
1932	Coup de feu à l'aube		French language version of Schuß im Morgengrauen, made in Germany
1933	Rivaux de la piste		French language version of Strich durch die Rechnung, made in Germany
1933	L'Étoile de Valencia	The Star of Valencia	French language version of Der Stern von Valencia, made in Germany
1934	L'or	Gold	French language version of Gold, co-directed with Karl Hartl in Germany
1934	Un de la montagne		French language version of Swiss-German film Die weiße Majestät, filmed in Switzerland
1935	Retour au paradis	Return to Paradise	
1935	Jonny, haute-couture		
1936	La Chanson du souvenir		
1937	Claudine à l'école	Claudine at School	Adapted from the novel by Colette
1939	Le Veau gras	The Fatted Calf	
1943	Le Baron fantôme	The Phantom Baron	Dialogue by Jean Cocteau
1945	La Fiancée des ténèbres		
1947	Torrents		
1950	La Soif des hommes	Thirst of Men	
1952	Alger - Le Cap		Documentary
1952	Cent ans de gloire		Short
1955	Les Armes de la paix		Documentary short

== Bibliography ==
- Crisp, C.G. The classic French cinema, 1930-1960. Indiana University Press, 1993
- Oscherwitz, Dayna & Higgins, MaryEllen. The A to Z of French Cinema. Scarecrow Press, 2009.
