= Yvonne Martin =

French film editor

- Born: Yvonne Beaugé; 29 February 1912; Courbevoie, Île-de-France, France
- Died: 8 March 1994 (aged 82); Dax, Landes, France
- Occupation: Film editor
- Years active: 1934–1985 (film)

Yvonne Martin (born Yvonne Beaugé, 29 February 1912 – 8 March 1994) was a French film editor. She worked on more than sixty films between 1934 and 1985. Her mother, Marguerite Beaugé (1892–1977) was also a renowned film editor.

== Selected filmography ==
- The Blaireau Case (1932)
- Lake of Ladies (1934)
- The Mysteries of Paris (1935)
- Under Western Eyes (1936)
- The Terrible Lovers (1936)
- Woman of Malacca (1937)
- Captain Benoit (1938)
- Personal Column (1939)
- The Emigrant (1940)
- First Ball (1941)
- Love Letters (1942)
- Angels of Sin (1943)
- The Angel They Gave Me (1946)
- That's Not the Way to Die (1946)
- The Lovers of Pont Saint Jean (1947)
- The Ironmaster (1948)
- Monseigneur (1949)
- No Pity for Women (1950)
- The Paris Waltz (1950)
- Gigolo (1951)
- Dirty Hands (1951)
- The Blonde Gypsy (1953)
- The Lovers of Midnight (1953)
- Sophie and the Crime (1955)
- My Priest Among the Poor (1956)
- Élisa (1957)

== Bibliography ==
- Greco, Joseph. The File on Robert Siodmak in Hollywood, 1941-1951. Universal-Publishers, 1999.
