= Claude Autant-Lara =

French film director (1901–2000)

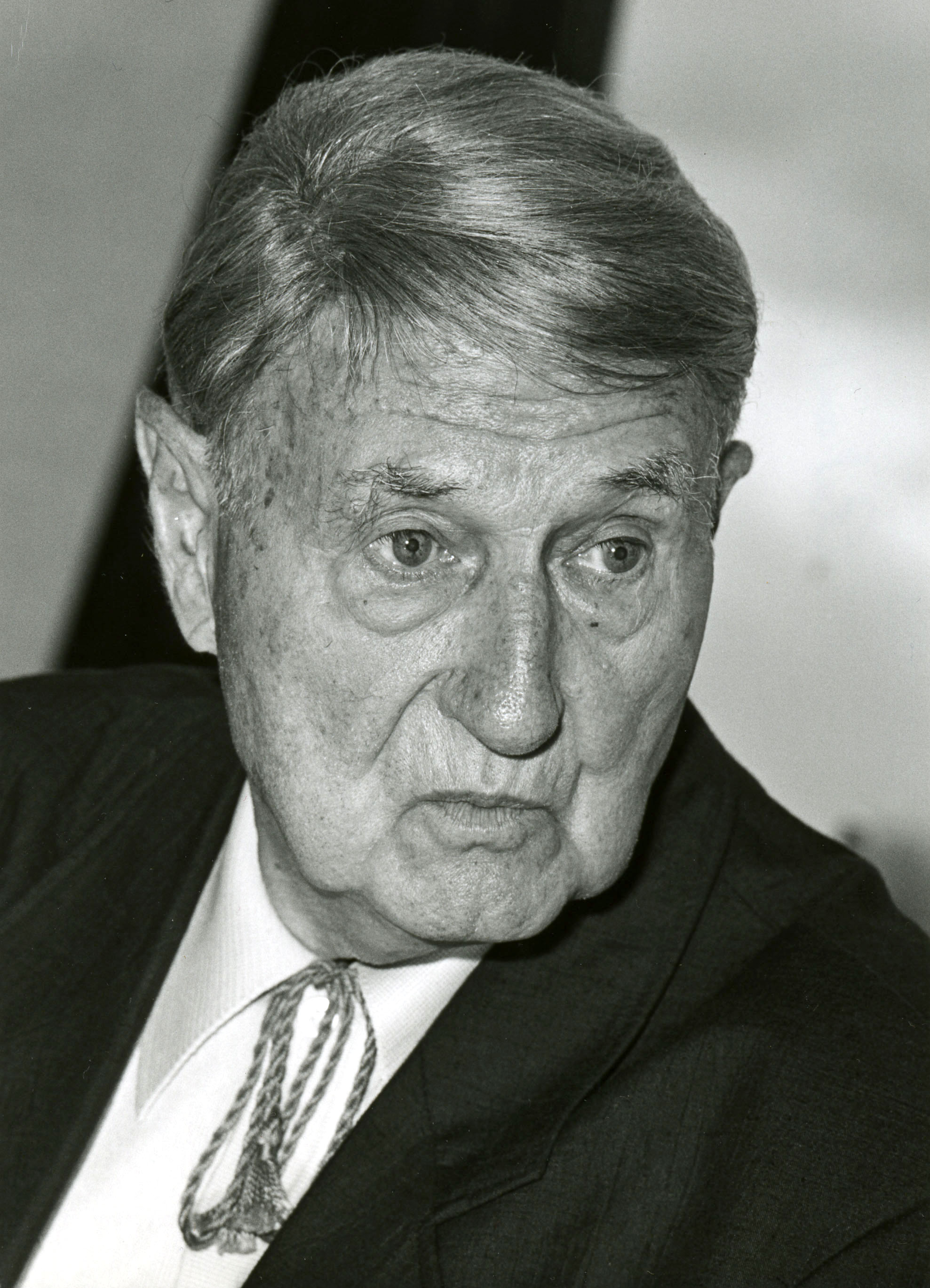
- Autant-Lara in 1989
- Born: Claude Autant; 5 August 1901; Luzarches, Val-d'Oise, France
- Died: 5 February 2000 (aged 98); Antibes, Alpes-Maritimes, France
- Occupations: Film director; screenwriter; set designer; costume designer; politician
- Political party: National Front

Member of the European Parliament
- In office 20 July 1989 – September 1989
- Succeeded by: Jean-Claude Martinez

Personal details
- Spouses: Odette Massonnet (m. 1926; div. 1935): Ghislaine Auboin

Claude Autant-Lara (French: [klod otɑ̃ laʁa]; 5 August 1901 – 5 February 2000) was a French film director, screenwriter, set designer and costume designer who worked in films for over 50 years. His films were often adapted from literary sources and sometimes expressed provocative (e.g. anti-clerical or sexually frank) attitudes. His career was frequently marked by controversy. In his late 80s he was elected to the European Parliament as a member for the far-right French National Front; he stepped down in the wake of outrage after he made antisemitic statements.

== Early life ==
Claude Autant-Lara was born on 5 August 1901 at Luzarches in Val-d'Oise. Édouard Autant, his father, was an architect, and his mother, Louise Lara, was an actress from the Comédie-Française. They were founders of the cultural group "Art et Action", which gave their son an early introduction to the theatre. During World War I his mother's pacifist activities brought her such unpopularity that she went into self-exile in London. Claude accompanied her and continued his education for two years at Mill Hill School in north London. On his return to France he studied at the École des beaux-arts and the École des arts décoratifs in Paris.

== Film career ==
Claude Autant-Lara appearing as an actor in Jean Renoir's Nana (1926).

In 1919, Autant-Lara (at the age of 18) was employed by the filmmaker Marcel L'Herbier as a set designer for Le Carnaval des vérités. L'Herbier continued to engage him for set and costume design on subsequent productions and in 1923 he gave him the opportunity to direct his first short film, Fait-divers, a "film without subtitles for three characters" which featured Louise Lara and Antonin Artaud. Autant-Lara also worked for other leading filmmakers, as assistant director for René Clair, and as costume designer for Jean Renoir on his lavish production of Nana (1926), in which he also acted. In 1927–28 he directed another short experimental film called Construire un feu, based on To Build a Fire by Jack London, for which he used for the first time the hypergonar, an anamorphic optical system to produce widescreen images invented by Henri Chrétien. (The process was not employed again, but in 1952 20th Century Fox purchased Chrétien's device and developed from it the CinemaScope format.)

Disheartened by the failure of this venture and in need of money, Autant-Lara went to Hollywood in 1930 where he found work making French versions of American comedies, including two featuring Buster Keaton. He did not adapt well to the American way of life and after two years he returned to France. There his first opportunity to direct a feature film came in 1933 with Ciboulette, an adaptation of the operetta by Reynaldo Hahn for which Jacques Prévert collaborated on the script. Controversy arose when one the work's original librettists objected publicly to some irreverent alterations which the filmmakers had made, and when the producers cut and re-edited the film, Autant-Lara disowned it. For nearly a decade after this, his work was mainly confined to co-directing films, notably with the producer Maurice Lehmann, but he was often uncredited.

During the German occupation of France in World War II, Autant-Lara (now over 40) finally found opportunities to direct films in his own name, and he began a long collaboration with the screenwriter Jean Aurenche (subsequently in partnership with Pierre Bost). He made three successful films in the period 1942-1944, all of them costume dramas which still carried echoes of the present day. The third of them, Douce, contained bitter portrayals of a bourgeois family and of religion, earning severe disapproval from the influential Centrale Catholique du Cinéma.

After the war he had an international success with Le Diable au corps, based on the controversial novel of 1923 by Raymond Radiguet. The film's portrayal of a schoolboy's adulterous affair during WWI caused fresh scandal in France and consolidated Autant-Lara's reputation for challenging the prevailing moral order.

Over the next decade Autant-Lara had his most successful period with a number of commercial successes, many of them being adaptations of literary works with period settings, including Occupe-toi d'Amélie (Feydeau) in 1949, Le Blé en herbe (Colette) and Le Rouge et le Noir (Stendhal), both in 1954. This habit of relying on literary scripts and plots made Autant-Lara (and his regular screenwriters Aurenche and Bost) the target of sharp criticism by the young François Truffaut in his influential attack on the "tradition de qualité" which he saw as stifling originality in French cinema. As the ideas of the New Wave gathered strength, the subsequent films of Autant-Lara began to seem increasingly outdated.

Nevertheless, his 1956 film La Traversée de Paris, which was among the first to take an unheroic view of the German occupation of France and the operation of the black market, was a notable success both with audiences and with critics (including Truffaut). In other films Autant-Lara continued to address sensitive or unpopular subjects, such as conscientious objection in Tu ne tueras point (1961), and abortion in Journal d'une femme en blanc (1965) and Nouveau journal d'une femme en blanc (1966). Other later films however were perceived as expressing an "aggressive vulgarity" and a kind of "poujadism which confirmed his drift into sneering populism". He became increasingly bitter towards his critics and the producers who were reluctant to finance his films, and his final film Gloria (1977) was largely ignored. Instead of further film-making, he turned to writing and produced a series of polemical books in which he settled scores with his opponents. The tone of these was conveyed in the title of his volume of memoirs, La Rage dans le cœur ("the rage in the heart").

== Political engagement and last years ==
Often outspoken and provocative, Autant-Lara was for much of his career associated with leftist and anti-establishment views. In his professional life he was extensively engaged in defending the cinema and he undertook intense union activity with the Fédération Nationale du Spectacle (President 1957-67), dealing with working conditions for different sections of the profession and their collective agreements, production contracts with other countries, and relations with the political authorities. He repeatedly challenged the rules on censorship, and he was admired for the positive roles for women which his films often gave.

After the damaging attacks on him by a younger generation of critics and filmmakers, and the production difficulties of his later films, he showed a growing readiness to blame the decadence of "the left" and its affiliation to a "Jewish conspiracy" for his problems. By the late 1980s he had joined the far-right National Front led by Jean-Marie Le Pen, and in June 1989, at the age of 87, he was elected to the European Parliament as a National Front MEP. At the opening session of the Parliament in July, following the tradition that the oldest elected member should take the president's chair for the initial proceedings, Autant-Lara used the opportunity to make a strongly anti-American speech, and a large number of other MEPs, including the Socialists and Christian Democrats, walked out of the chamber in protest. In September 1989 the monthly magazine Globe published an interview with Autant-Lara in which he made offensive and anti-semitic statements, particularly directed at Simone Veil, a former president of the European Parliament and a survivor of the Auschwitz concentration camp. He accused her of exploiting her experiences of the Nazi camps to gather sympathy for herself, and he went on to cast doubt on the accepted facts about the Holocaust.

In the considerable scandal which arose after publication of these remarks, he was forced to resign his seat in the Parliament. He was also excluded from the Académie des Beaux-Arts, of which he was a vice-president, when its members voted to prohibit him from taking his seat.

Thereafter he lived quietly in the south of France and he died in Antibes on 5 February 2000 at the age of 98. He was buried in the cemetery of Montmartre (section 26) in Paris.

== Personal life ==
Autant married Odette Massonnet in 1926 (divorced 1935). He later married Ghislaine Auboin (1915–1967), who worked as an assistant director on many of his films from 1942 onwards.

== Publications by Autant-Lara ==
- 1981 : Télémafia. Nice : A. Lefeuvre, 1981. ISBN 2-902639-63-5.
- 1984 : La Rage dans le cœur. [Paris] : H. Veyrier, 1984. ISBN 2-85199-322-4. (Chronique cinématographique du 20e siècle [1])
- 1985 : Hollywood Cake-Walk 1930-1932. Paris : H. Veyrier, 1985. ISBN 2-85199-353-4. (Chronique cinématographique du 20e siècle [2])
- 1987 : Les Fourgons du malheur. Paris : Carrère, 1987. ISBN 2-86804-443-3. (Chronique cinématographique du 20e siècle [3])
- 1989 : Le Bateau coule : discours de réception à l'Académie des Beaux-arts. Paris: Libertés, 1989. ISBN 2-903279-14-4.
- 1990 : Le Coq et le Rat: chronique cinématographique du XXe siècle. Châtillon-sur-Chalaronne: Ed. le Flambeau, 1990. ISBN 2-908040-03-4. (In merdam salutis, 1)
