= Emergency Visitors' Visa Program =

U.S. visa program for Nazi-era refugees

The Emergency Visitors' Visa Program was a United States government program that offered temporary admission to people fleeing Nazi persecution during World War II. The administration of President Franklin D. Roosevelt established it in 1940 after the fall of France. The program allowed selected refugees, including writers, artists, and labor leaders, to enter the United States outside its immigration quotas.

== Origins ==
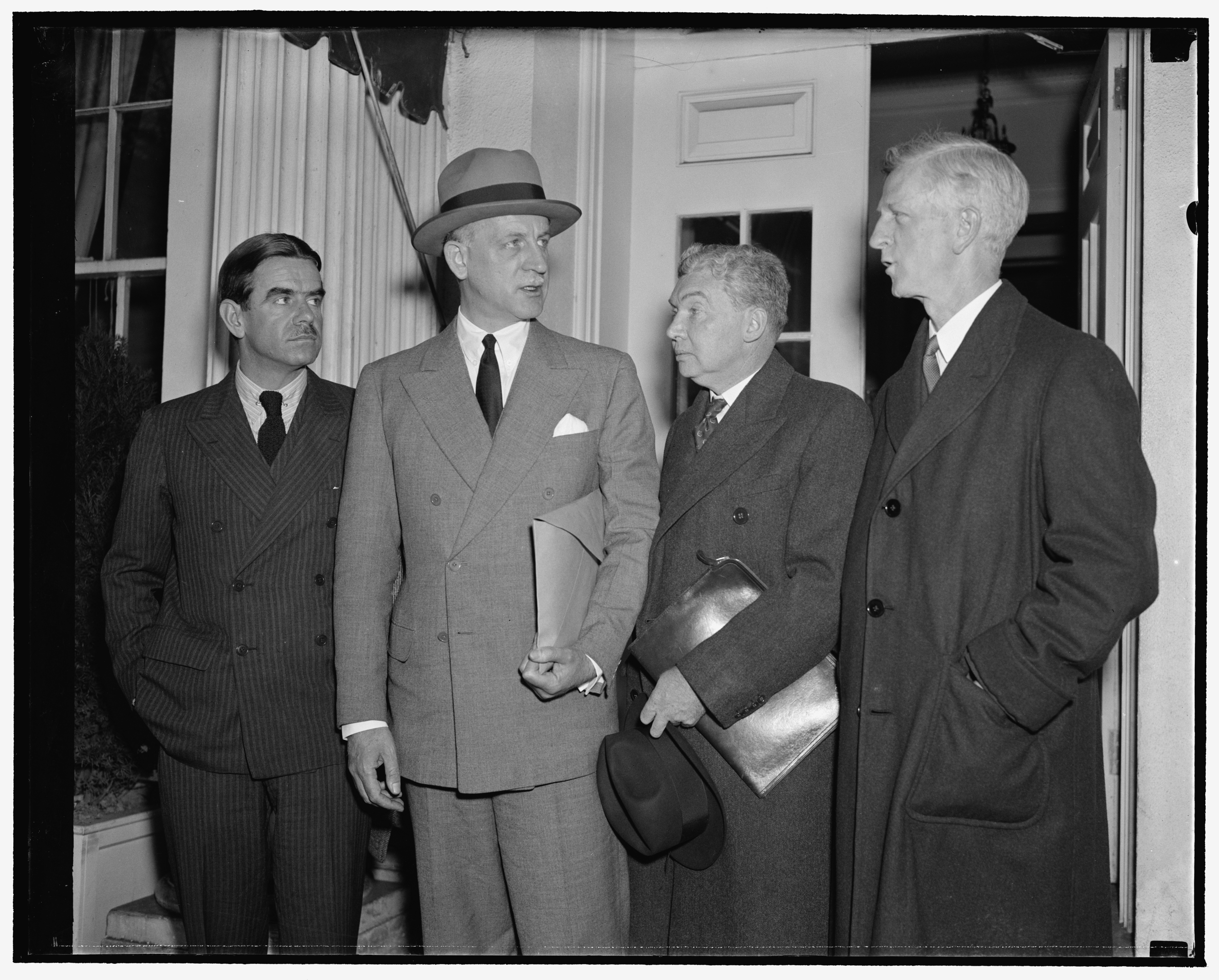
Members of the President's Advisory Committee on Political Refugees at the White House in November 1938

The June 1940 armistice required France to turn over German nationals named by the German government. The provision endangered people who had fled to France from Nazi Germany. The Immigration Act of 1924 limited permanent immigration through national-origin quotas. The President's Advisory Committee on Political Refugees, established in 1938, proposed using visitor visas to admit people targeted for their opposition to the Nazis.

== Operation ==
The State Department and the Justice Department adopted a procedure on July 26, 1940, to review cases before forwarding approved names to U.S. consuls. Applicants had to show they had financial support, provide information about their activities and why they were in danger, and agree to leave the United States when they could. Holders could stay beyond the usual six-month limit for visitors.

The Emergency Rescue Committee sent Varian Fry to Marseille, where he helped refugees obtain visas and leave France. The Jewish Labor Committee secured temporary visas for European labor and socialist leaders and their families through the U.S. consulate in Marseille. In September 1940, U.S. officials admitted 41 passengers aboard the SS Quanza on emergency visitor visas at Norfolk, Virginia, after Mexico refused them entry.

== Restrictions and closure ==
Assistant Secretary of State Breckinridge Long called for closer screening of applicants on security grounds. A November 1940 agreement required the advisory committee to examine candidates more closely and set up a separate committee to review security concerns. Consuls retained the final decision on whether to issue a visa.

The program ended in July 1941, by which time officials had issued 1,236 of the 3,268 visas they had authorized. About 2,000 refugees had arrived on emergency visitor visas by the end of 1941.

== See also ==
- United States and the Holocaust
