= Tonight We Raid Calais =

1943 film by John Brahm

- Theatrical release poster
- Directed by: John Brahm
- Written by: L. Willinger; Rohama Lee
- Screenplay by: Waldo Salt
- Produced by: André Daven
- Cinematography: Lucien Ballard
- Edited by: Allen McNeil
- Music by: Cyril J. Mockridge; Emil Newman
- Distributed by: 20th Century Fox
- Release date: April 30, 1943
- Running time: 70 minutes
- Country: United States
- Language: English

Tonight We Raid Calais is a 1943 American film directed by John Brahm and starring John Sutton, Lee J. Cobb, and Annabella.

== Plot ==
Geoffrey Carter (John Sutton), a young British commando officer, is sent into Nazi-occupied France as a one-man raid to help the RAF destroying a munitions factory with help from a patriotic farmer, M. Bonnard (Lee J. Cobb). Carter is selected because of his ability to speak French fluently.

After landing in France, Carter makes contact with Bonnard at his farm. Bonnard's daughter Odette (Annabella) hates the British and Germans equally since her brother was killed in Oran. She is concerned that harbouring a commando puts the family in danger. Bonnard invents an idea to tell the people in the village that Carter is his missing son, Pierre, who has returned from fighting for the German army.

Bonnard gathers the local farmers in the village to tell them about Carter's plan to set their crops alight in the fields that surround the munitions factory to act as a beacon for an RAF bombing raid. Most of the farmers agree because of their hatred of the occupation, but Grandet (Marcel Dalio) refuses saying that burning their crops would bring more problems and would only result in them having less food.

German Sgt. Block (Howard Da Silva), who is attracted to Odette, becomes suspicious when he hears that Pierre has returned to the village without registering or showing his papers. He visits Mme. Bonnard (Beulah Bondi) and confirms his suspicions by asking to see a photograph of her son. He immediately has Carter and the Bonnard family, with the exception of Odette, arrested and taken into custody. Block tells his captain (Richard Derr) that Odette is a supporter of the German occupation, which the captain exploits by telling her to find out what Carter was planning or her family will be executed.

Odette finds Grandet, who is drinking alone in a local café, to ask him what he knows about Carter's mission. He reveals the objective is to destroy the munitions factory, but for fear of being overheard they part company before he's able to reveal details of the bombing raid. Odette rushes back to the prison and finds her family lined up in front of a firing squad. She tells the captain what she knows, but he gives the order to fire and Odette sees her family executed.

The captain issues arrest orders for anyone in the village suspected to be part of the plot. He then takes a group of soldiers to the factory in an attempt to stop the plot from happening, still not knowing it will be bombed in an air raid. All the women farmers from the village become suspects and are arrested and imprisoned.

Traumatised and feeling vengeful, Odette plays along as a German sympathiser and visits the jail where Carter and the locals are being held. She stabs Block with a shard of glass from a broken mirror when they are alone, takes his keys and releases the other prisoners.

Carter, Odette and the farmers escape and make their way to the fields surrounding the munitions factory and successfully set fire to the crops just in time for the RAF bombers to find their target and destroy the factory.

Carter heads off on the river out of the village back to Calais in a small boat and offers to take the baby Odette is raising, who is Pierre's son, with him back to England and look after him until the end of the war when Odette will come to get him.

== Cast ==
- Annabella as Odette Bonnard
- John Sutton as Geoffrey Carter
- Lee J. Cobb as Bonnard
- Beulah Bondi as Mme. Bonnard
- Blanche Yurka as Widow Grelieu
- Howard Da Silva as Sgt. Block
- Marcel Dalio as Jaques Grandet
- Ann Codee as Mme. Grandet
- Richard Derr as German Captain (unbilled)
- Eula Morgan as Daughter (unbilled)
- other unbilled players include Sven Hugo Borg

== Reception ==
Quentin Tarantino picked Tonight We Raid Calais as one of his five favorite World War II films. It was one of the films he discovered while doing research for his own World War II film, Inglourious Basterds.
