= Marcel Dalio =

French actor (1899–1983)

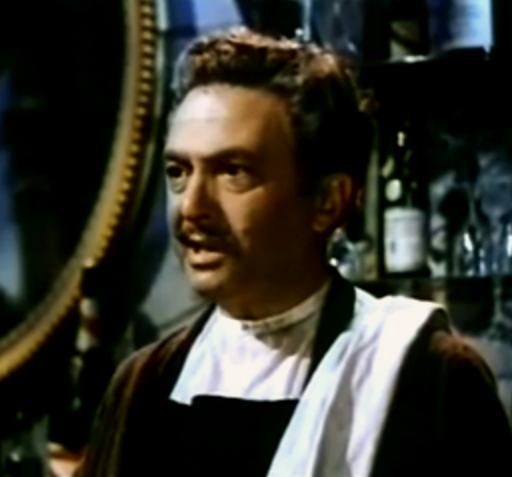
- Dalio in The Snows of Kilimanjaro (1952)
- Born: Marcel Benoit Blauschild; 23 November 1899; Paris, France
- Died: 18 November 1983 (aged 83); Paris, France
- Other names: Israel Mosche Blauschild; Dalio
- Education: Conservatoire de Paris
- Occupation: Actor
- Years active: 1931–1982
- Spouses: Jany Holt (m. 1936; div. 1939) Madeleine Lebeau (m. 1939; div. 1942): Michèle Béryl (m. 19??; ? 19??); Madeleine Prime (m. 19??; ? 19??)

Marcel Dalio (born Marcel Benoit Blauschild; 23 November 1899 – 18 November 1983), sometimes credited mononymously as Dalio, was a French actor. He began his career in the 1930s as a leading man, notably starring in Jean Renoir's La Grande Illusion (1937) and The Rules of the Game (1939), before becoming known as in-demand character actor. His film career spanned nearly 200 productions released between 1931 and 1982, both in France and the United States.

== Life and career ==
=== Early life and career in France ===
Dalio was born Marcel Benoit Blauschild in Paris to Romanian-Jewish immigrant parents. His Jewish name was Israel Mosche. He trained at the Paris Conservatoire and performed in revues from 1920. He appeared in stage plays from the 1920s and acted in French films in the 1930s, typically credited under the mononym "Dalio".

His first big film success was in Julien Duvivier's Pépé le Moko (1937). He followed them with starring roles in two films for Jean Renoir, La Grande Illusion (1937) and The Rules of the Game (1939).

After divorcing his first wife, Jany Holt, he married the young actress Madeleine Lebeau in 1939.

=== Wartime exile ===
In June 1940, Dalio and Lebeau left Paris ahead of the invading German army and reached Lisbon. They are presumed to have received transit visas from Aristides de Sousa Mendes, allowing them to enter Spain and journey on to Portugal. It took them two months to get visas to Chile. However, when their ship, the S.S. Quanza, stopped in Mexico, they were stranded (along with around 200 other passengers) when the Chilean visas they had purchased turned out to be forgeries. Eventually they were able to get temporary Canadian passports and entered the United States. Meanwhile, the advancing German Nazi army in occupied France used posters of his face as a representative of "a typical Jew". All other members of Dalio's family died in Nazi concentration camps.

In Hollywood, although Dalio was never quite able to regain the profile he had in France, he appeared in 19 American films during the Second World War, in stereotypical roles as a Frenchman. Dalio's first film in the United States was the Fred MacMurray comedy One Night in Lisbon (1941) in which he portrayed a hotel concierge. Around the same time, he appeared in the Edward G. Robinson film Unholy Nights and the Gene Tierney film The Shanghai Gesture (also 1941). He remained busy, appearing in Flight Lieutenant (1942) starring Pat O'Brien and Glenn Ford. Dalio next portrayed a Frenchman, Focquet, in the film The Pied Piper (also 1942). In this film, Monty Woolley portrayed an Englishman trying to get out of France with an ever-increasing number of children ahead of the German invasion. Dalio then appeared among the star-studded cast in Tales of Manhattan (both 1942).

In the uncredited role of Emil the croupier in Casablanca (also 1942), he appeared in the scene when Captain Renault closes down Rick's Cafe American using the pretext, "I am shocked, shocked to find that gambling is going on in here!", Emil approaches him and hands him his usual bribe money saying, "Your winnings sir", while Rick darts Emil a flabbergasted look. His wife Madeleine Lebeau was also in the film, playing Yvonne, Rick's intermittent girlfriend. On 22 June, while Lebeau was filming her scenes with Hans Twardowski as the German officer, Dalio filed for divorce in Los Angeles on the grounds of desertion.

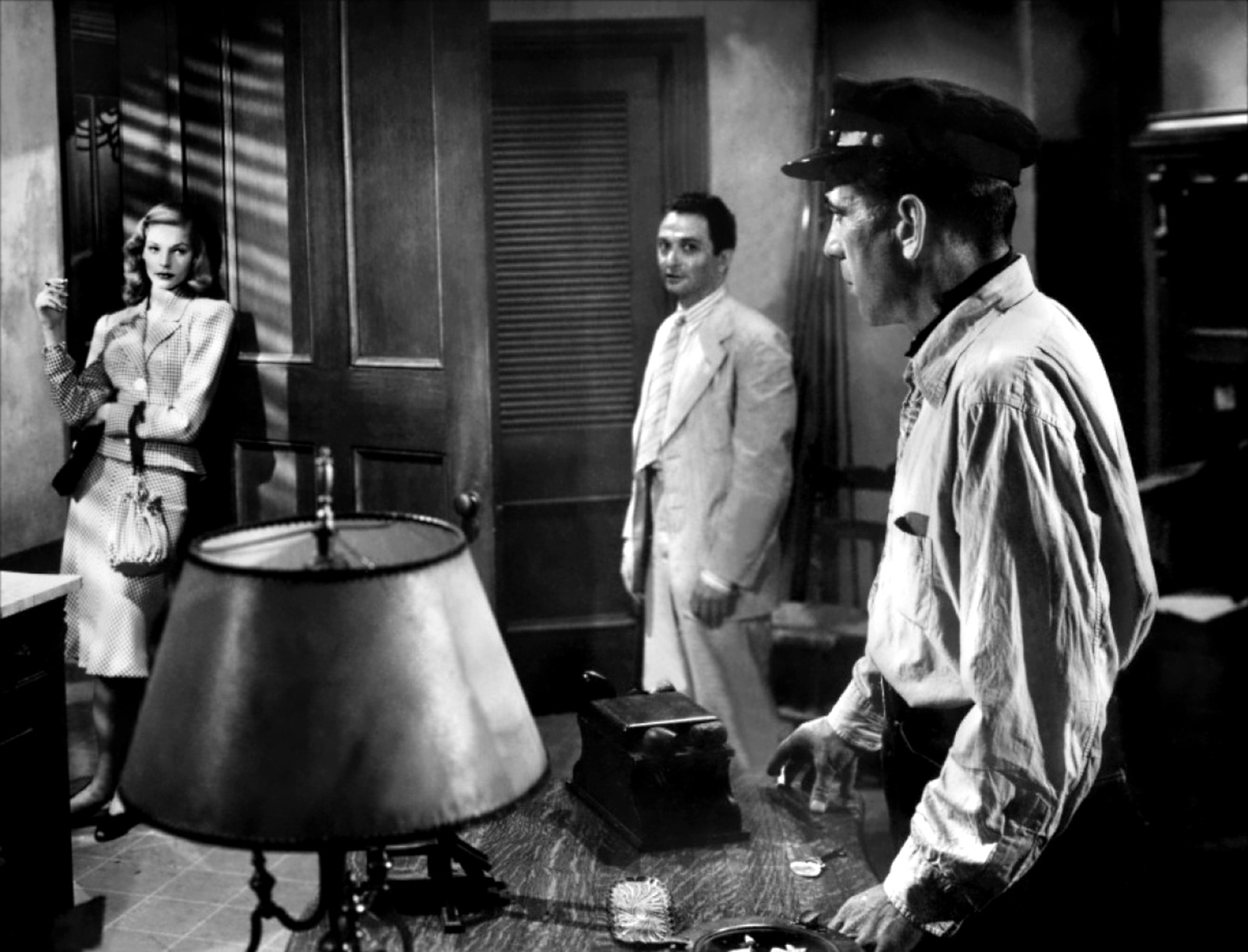
Lauren Bacall, Marcel Dalio and Humphrey Bogart in To Have and Have Not (1944)

He was cast in some larger roles, for example in the war dramas Tonight We Raid Calais and Paris After Dark (both 1943), in the latter his ex-wife Lebeau also appeared. Dalio played a French policeman in The Song of Bernadette (also 1943). His penultimate wartime role in an American film was in the adaptation of To Have and Have Not (1944) reuniting him with Humphrey Bogart.

=== Postwar ===
When the war in Europe ended in May 1945, Dalio returned to France to continue his movie career. His first appearance that year was in Her Final Role (Son dernier rôle, 1946). He appeared in ten more movies in France and one in England through the late 1940s. He played Captain Nikarescu in Black Jack (1950).

Dalio appeared in four American movies in the mid-1950s. Gentlemen Prefer Blondes starring Jane Russell and Marilyn Monroe and Flight to Tangier (both 1953) starring Joan Fontaine, Lucky Me starring Doris Day and Sabrina (both 1954) starring Bogart and Audrey Hepburn. In Sabrina, the bearded Dalio played one of Hepburn's fellow cooking students in Paris. He then briefly returned to France.

Dalio portrayed the Claude Rains character, Captain Renault, in the short-lived television series Casablanca (1955). Dalio had the role of a French sergeant in the war drama Jump into Hell (also 1955) about the French defeat at the Battle of Dien Bien Phu in Vietnam. Dalio appeared in the musical comedy Ten Thousand Bedrooms starring Dean Martin, with Paul Henreid in the supporting cast. He also appeared as a French priest in a war movie, again about the French involvement in Vietnam, called China Gate which features the acting of Nat King Cole. Finally that year, Dalio played Zizi in The Sun Also Rises (all 1957) his third movie based on an Ernest Hemingway novel, this time starring Tyrone Power and Ava Gardner. Over the next four years, he appeared in Lafayette Escadrille, The Perfect Furlough (both 1958) starring Tony Curtis, The Man Who Understood Women starring Henry Fonda, Pillow Talk (both 1959) starring Rock Hudson and Doris Day, Can-Can (1960) starring Frank Sinatra and The Devil at 4 O'Clock (1961) starring Sinatra and Spencer Tracy.

After making more movies in France, Dalio received a major supporting role in the mystery The List of Adrian Messenger (1963), set entirely in England but filmed primarily in Hollywood. Two of Dalio's previous co-stars, Tony Curtis and Frank Sinatra, had cameos in the film. This was followed with the part of Father Cluzeot in the John Wayne movie, Donovan's Reef (also 1963). After appearing again with Tony Curtis in Wild and Wonderful (1964), Dalio returned to France. He continued making movies for Hollywood, but he also appeared in many French productions.

Later movies featuring Dalio include Lady L (1965) starring Sophia Loren and Paul Newman, How to Steal a Million (1966) starring Audrey Hepburn and Peter O'Toole and How Sweet It Is! (1968) starring Debbie Reynolds and James Garner. In Mike Nichols' Catch-22 Dalio played the old Italian living in the whorehouse, while he also appeared in The Great White Hope (both 1970) with James Earl Jones. From then on, he did movies almost entirely in France, the best known of them being the comedy The Mad Adventures of Rabbi Jacob (1973) and the controversial erotic horror La Bête (1975) directed by Walerian Borowczyk.

His last appearance was in a TV movie portraying Lord Exeter in Les Longuelune (1982).

=== Television ===
Dalio also appeared in numerous television shows both in the United States (between 1954 and 1963) and in France (1968 to 1981). These include guest appearances in Alfred Hitchcock Presents, Peter Gunn, 77 Sunset Strip, Maverick (in "Game of Chance" with James Garner and Jack Kelly), Alcoa Presents: One Step Beyond and Ben Casey.

== Personal life ==
Dalio married four times. His first two marriages, both ending in divorce, were to actresses Jany Holt and Madeleine Lebeau. He married Hollywood-based French journalist Madeleine [Alena] Prime in Los Angeles, in 1981, and the two were together until his death.

=== Death ===
Dalio died in Paris on 18 November 1983, just 5 days shy of his 84th birthday. He is buried in Montrouge Cemetery in Hauts de Seine.

== Selected filmography ==
- Olive passager clandestin (1931) – Caravanos
- The Night at the Hotel (1932) – Jérôme
- My Hat (1933) – Bokalas
- Les affaires publiques (1934) – Le speaker / Le sculpteur / Le capitaine des pompiers / L'amiral
- Turandot, Princess of China (1935) – Hippolyte
- Return to Paradise (1935) – Le notaire
- Le golem (1936) – (uncredited)
- When Midnight Strikes (1936)
- Beethoven's Great Love (1936) – L'éditeur Steiner
- Pépé le Moko (1937) – L'Arbi
- White Cargo (1937) – Pérez
- L'Homme à abattre (1937)
- Marthe Richard (1937) – Pedro
- The Pearls of the Crown (1937) – Le ministre d'Abyssinie
- La Grande Illusion (1937) – Le lieutenant Rosenthal
- Sarati the Terrible (1937) – Benoît
- The Kiss of Fire (1937) – Le photographe
- Miarka (1937) – Le maire
- Rail Pirates (1938) – Le mercenaire
- Mollenard (1938) – Happy Jones
- Chéri-Bibi (1938) – Le donneur
- Sirocco (1938) – Matteo Gordina – le Maltais
- The Curtain Rises (1938) – Le jude d'instruction
- Conflict (1938) – L'usurier / The Money-Lender
- The White Slave (1939) – Le sultan Soliman
- Midnight Tradition (1939) – Édouard Mutter, l'antiquaire
- La Règle du jeu (1939) – Marquis Robert de la Cheyniest
- Sacred Woods (1939) – Zakouskine, le danseur
- Thunder Over Paris (1940) – Barel
- One Night in Lisbon (1941) – Concierge
- Unholy Partners (1941) – Molyneaux
- The Shanghai Gesture (1941) – The Master of the Spinning Wheel
- Flight Lieutenant (1942) – Marcel Faulet (uncredited)
- The Pied Piper (1942) – Focquet
- Tales of Manhattan (1942) – 2nd Salesman at Santelli's (Fields sequence) (uncredited)
- Casablanca (1942) – Emil, Croupier at Rick's (uncredited)
- Tonight We Raid Calais (1943) – Jacques Grandet
- The Constant Nymph (1943) – Georges
- Paris After Dark (1943) – Luigi, Quisling Barber
- Flesh and Fantasy (1943) – Clown (uncredited)
- The Desert Song (1943) – Tarbouch
- The Song of Bernadette (1943) – Callet
- Action in Arabia (1944) – Chakka, Arab Henchman at Airport
- Pin Up Girl (1944) – Pierre (uncredited)
- Wilson (1944) – Premier Georges Clemenceau
- To Have and Have Not (1944) – Gérard (Frenchy)
- A Bell for Adano (1945) – Zito
- Her Final Role (1946) – Ardouin
- Pétrus (1946) – Luciani
- Temptation Harbour (1947) – Inspector Dupré
- The Damned (1947) – Larga
- Snowbound (1948) – Stefano Valdini
- Judicial Error (1948) – Dinari
- Dédée d'Anvers (1948) – Marco
- Dark Sunday (1948) – Max – l'éditeur
- The Lovers Of Verona (1949) – Amedeo Maglia
- Wicked City (1949) – Aimé – un nervi
- Portrait of an Assassin (1949) – Fred dit Bébé
- Maya (1949) – Le steward
- Death Threat (1950) – Denis
- Black Jack (1950) – Captain Nikarescu
- Oriental Port (1950) – Zarapoulos
- On the Riviera (1951) – Philippe Lebrix
- Rich, Young and Pretty (1951) – Claude Duval
- We Will All Go to Monte Carlo (1951) – Poulos, l'imprésario
- Lovely to Look At (1952) – Pierre
- The Merry Widow (1952) – Police Sergeant
- The Snows of Kilimanjaro (1952) – Emile
- The Happy Time (1952) – Grandpere Bonnard
- Gentlemen Prefer Blondes (1953) – Magistrate
- Flight to Tangier (1953) – Goro
- Monte Carlo Baby (1953) – Melissa Farrell's Agent
- Lucky Me (1954) – Anton
- La Patrouille des sables (1954) – Maillard
- Sabrina (1954) – Baron St. Fontanel
- Tres hombres van a morir (1954) – Maillard
- The Lovers of Lisbon (1955) – Porfirio
- Jump Into Hell (1955) – Sergeant Taite
- Razzia sur la chnouf (1955) – Paul Liski
- Miracle in the Rain (1956) – Marcel, Waiter
- Anything Goes (1956) – Ship's Captain (uncredited)
- Ten Thousand Bedrooms (1957) – Vittorio Cisini
- China Gate (1957) – Father Paul
- The Sun Also Rises (1957) – Zizi
- Tip on a Dead Jockey (1957) – Toto del Aro
- Alfred Hitchcock Presents (1958) (Season 3 Episode 22: "The Return of the Hero") - Corporal Marcel Marchand
- Lafayette Escadrille (1958) – Drill Sergeant
- The Perfect Furlough (1958) – Henri Valentin
- Alcoa Presents: One Step Beyond (10/2/1959) ('The Dark Room', episode) -Jean Gabeau, Ghost
- The Man Who Understood Women (1959) – Le Marne
- Pillow Talk (1959) – Pierot
- Can-Can (1960) – Andre, the head waiter
- Classe Tous Risques (1960) – Arthur Gibelin
- Song Without End (1960) – Chelard
- The Devil at 4 O'Clock (1961) – Gaston
- Jessica (1962) – Luigi Tuffi
- Cartouche (1962) – Malichot
- Le Petit Garçon de l'ascenseur (1962) – Antonio
- The Law of Men (1962) – L'avocat Plautet
- Le Diable et les Dix Commandements (1962) – Le bijoutier / Jeweler (segment "Luxurieux point ne seras")
- L'Abominable Homme des douanes (1963) – Gregor
- The List of Adrian Messenger (1963) – Max Karoudjian
- Donovan's Reef (1963) – Father Cluzeot
- À couteaux tirés (1964) – Jean Grégor / Gregor Veloni
- Wild and Wonderful (1964) – Dr. Reynard
- The Monocle Laughs (1964) – Elie Mayerfitsky
- Male Companion (1964) – Socratès
- Tintin and the Blue Oranges (1964) – (voice, uncredited)
- Lady L (1965) – Sapper
- Made in Paris (1966) – Georges
- Un garçon, une fille. Le dix-septième ciel (1966) – Le maître d'hôtel
- How to Steal a Million (1966) – Senor Paravideo
- Tender Scoundrel (1966) – Le père de Véronique
- The 25th Hour (1967) – Strul
- The Oldest Profession (1967) – Me Vladimir Leskov (segment "Aujourd'hui")
- How Sweet It Is! (1968) – Louis
- Du blé en liasses (1969) – Vanessian
- Justine (1969) – French Consul General
- Catch-22 (1970) – Old Man in Whorehouse
- The Great White Hope (1970) – French Promoter
- L'amour c'est gai, l'amour c'est triste (1971) – M. Paul
- Aussi loin que l'amour (1971) – Le milliardaire
- Papa les p'tits bateaux (1971) – Boudu, le clochard
- Les Yeux fermés (1972) – Le vieux monsieur
- La punition (1973) – Le Libanais
- The Mad Adventures of Rabbi Jacob (1973) – Rabbi Jacob
- Ursule et Grelu (1974) – Le réceptionniste
- Dédé la tendresse (1974)
- La Bête (1975) – Duc Rammendelo De Balo
- Let Joy Reign Supreme (1975) – Le noble suffocant au repas (uncredited)
- Trop c'est trop (1975) – Saint-Pierre
- La chatte sur un doigt brûlant (1975) – Hector Franbourgeois
- Le faux-cul (1975) – Cohen
- Hard Love (1975) – Le maître d'hôtel
- The Wing or the Thigh (1976) – Le tailleur de Duchemin
- Solemn Communion (1977) – Old Charles Gravet
- Shadow of the Castles (1977) – Père Renard
- L'Honorable Société (1978) – Marcel
- One Page of Love (1978) – Le père de Fanny
- Surprise Sock (1978) – Monsieur L'église
- Le paradis des riches (1978) – Mathieu
- Brigade mondaine: Vaudou aux Caraïbes (1980) – Mazoyer
