= Ann Codee =

Belgian actress (1890–1961)

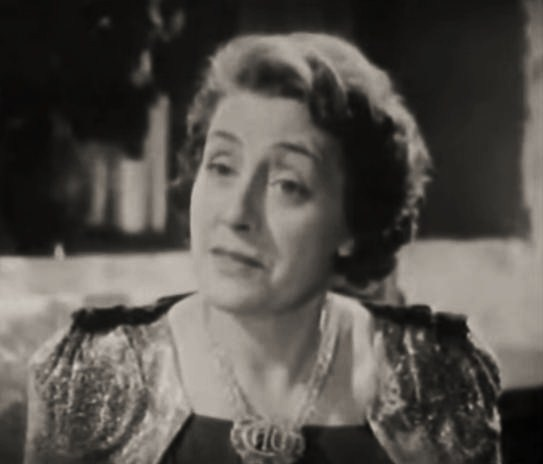
- Codee in Drums of the Desert (1940)
- Born: Anna Maria Van Huffelen; 5 March 1890; Antwerp, Belgium
- Died: 18 May 1961 (aged 71); Los Angeles, California, U.S.
- Resting place: Forest Lawn Memorial Park, Hollywood Hills
- Other name: Anna Cody
- Occupation: Actor
- Years active: 1928–1960
- Spouse: Frank Orth (m. 1911)
- Children: 2

Ann Codee (born Anna Marie Vannuefflin or Ann Van Huffelen; 5 March 1890 – 18 May 1961) was a Belgian actress with numerous hit films on her résumé, such as Can-Can, Kiss Me Kate, and Interrupted Melody. Born in Antwerp, Belgium, her name was sometimes found in newspapers as Anna Cody.

== Biography ==
Codee was born in Brussels, Belgium, or in Antwerp, a sixth-generation member of a family of circus performers. She was a circus star by age 10, and in 1908 she and two sisters began performing in a Circus Days show at the Hippodrome in New York.

She married actor Frank Orth around 1911. She and her husband toured American vaudeville in the 1910s and 1920s as the comedy act "Codee and Orth". The team made its film debut in 1929, appearing in a series of multilingual movie shorts. Thereafter, both Codee and Orth flourished as Hollywood character actors. Codee was seen in dozens of films as florists, music teachers, landladies, governesses and grandmothers. She played a variety of ethnic types, from the very French Mme. Poullard in Jezebel (1938) to the Gallic Tante Berthe in The Mummy's Curse (1941).

Codee's last film appearance was as a tight-corseted committeewoman in Can-Can (1960). Her career highlights include her part in the Natalie Wood film Kings Go Forth (1948) and the Oscar-nominated Ann Miller film Kiss Me Kate (1953). She also had an uncredited role as the biologist Dr. Dupree in the 1953 film The War of the Worlds.

=== Name changes ===
When she began touring with Orth, she changed her last name, and the duo was billed as Orth and Cody. After about three years, Jacob J. Shubert decided to give the act a French flavor. He changed the spelling of her last name, billing the pair as Orth and Codee. He also "fixed her up with 38 trunks, several French poodles and publicized her as a fresh and exciting arrival from 'Gay Paree'".

== Personal life and death ==
Codeedied of a heart attack in Los Angeles, California on May 18, 1961, aged 71. She is buried in Forest Lawn Cemetery in the Hollywood Hills next to her husband. She had a son and a daughter.

== Partial filmography ==
- 42nd Street (1928, Short)
- Meet The Wife (1929, Short) as The Wife
- Stranded in Paris (1929, Short)
- A Bird in the Hand (1929, Short)
- Music Hath Charms (1929, Short) as Violin Teacher
- Meine Frau (1930, Short) as The Wife
- Frank Orthe and Anne Codee in "Imagine my Embarrassment" (1930, Short) as The Sleeping Wife
- Taking Ways (1930, Short) as The Wife
- The Bitter Half (1931, Short) as Ann, the Wife
- Sleepy Head (1931)
- Dumb Luck (1931)
- Under the Pampas Moon (1935) as Madame LaMarr
- Hi, Gaucho! (1935) as Doña Vincenta del Campo
- Brilliant Marriage (1936) as Yvette Duval
- Thin Ice (1937) as Interviewer (uncredited)
- Fit for a King (1937) as Telephone Operator (uncredited)
- Expensive Husbands (1937) as Maria
- Jezebel (1938) as Mme. Poullard (uncredited)
- The Roaring Twenties (1939) as Saleswoman (uncredited)
- Charlie Chan in City in Darkness (1939) as Complainant at Police (uncredited)
- I Was an Adventuress (1940) as Frenchwoman at Party (uncredited)
- Captain Caution (1940) as Landlady
- Drums of the Desert (1940) as Mme. Fouchet
- Arise, My Love (1940) as Mme. Bresson
- Come Live With Me (1941) as Yvonne
- Charlie Chan in Rio (1941) as Margo
- Woman of the Year (1942) as Madame Sylvia (uncredited)
- Dr. Renault's Secret (1942) as Passerby at Marcel's Shop (uncredited)
- Army Surgeon (1942) as Flower Woman (uncredited)
- Reunion in France (1942) as Rosalie (uncredited)
- Old Acquaintance (1943) as Tress, Greer Garson's Maid (uncredited)
- Tonight We Raid Calais (1943) as Mme. Grandet
- Paris After Dark (1943) as Mme. Benoit (uncredited)
- Shine On, Harvest Moon (1944) as Wardrobe Woman (uncredited)
- Show Business (1944) as French Modiste (uncredited)
- Mr. Skeffington (1944) as French Modiste (scenes deleted)
- Bathing Beauty (1944) as Mme. Zarka
- Marriage Is a Private Affair (1944) as Madame Cushine (uncredited)
- The Mummy's Curse (1944) as Tante Berthe (uncredited)
- Tonight and Every Night (1945) as Annette (uncredited)
- Hangover Square (1945) as Yvette, Netta's Maid (uncredited)
- The Clock (1945) as Lady on Bus (uncredited)
- Secret Agent X-9 (1945, Serial) as 'Mama Pierre' Dupray
- Her Highness and the Bellboy (1945) as Countess Tradiska (uncredited)
- Kitty (1945) as Madame Aurelie (uncredited)
- Johnny Angel (1945) as Charwoman (uncredited)
- This Love of Ours (1945) as Anna
- Holiday in Mexico (1946) as Margaret, Evans' Housekeeper (uncredited)
- It's Great to Be Young (1946) as Mrs. Johnson
- So Dark the Night (1946) as Mama Michaud
- Till the Clouds Roll By (1946) as Mme. Larouche (uncredited)
- The Other Love (1947) as The Florist (uncredited)
- Lured (1947) as Matilda (uncredited)
- The Unfinished Dance (1947) as Mme. Borodin
- Rose of Santa Rosa (1947) as Aunt Isabel
- Tycoon (1947) as When Willie Comes Marching Home
- That Midnight Kiss (1949) as Mme. Bouget
- When Willie Comes Marching Home (1950) as French Resistance Fighter (uncredited)
- The Secret Fury (1950) as Tessa (uncredited)
- Under My Skin (1950) as Henriette (uncredited)
- A Lady Without Passport (1950) as Maria, Marianne's Landlady (uncredited)
- Al Jennings of Oklahoma (1951) as Mme. Le Cler (uncredited)
- Mr. Imperium (1951) as Anna Pelan
- Go for Broke! (1951) as Pianist (uncredited)
- On the Riviera (1951) as Mme. Madeleine Periton (uncredited)
- Rich, Young and Pretty (1951) as Mme. Milan (uncredited)
- An American in Paris (1951) as Therese (uncredited)
- Detective Story (1951) as French Woman (uncredited)
- The Lady Pays Off (1951) as Marie
- What Price Glory (1952) as Nun (uncredited)
- The Iron Mistress (1952) as Landlady (uncredited)
- The Clown (1953) as Ballet Instructor (uncredited)
- The War of the Worlds (1953) as Dr. Dupree (uncredited)
- Dangerous When Wet (1953) as Mrs. Lanet
- Kiss Me Kate (1953) as Suzanne
- The Last Time I Saw Paris (1954) as Nurse #2 (uncredited)
- Alfred Hitchcock Presents (1955) (Season 1 Episode 5: "Into Thin Air" a.k.a. "The Vanishing Lady") - Doctor's Wife
- So This Is Paris (1954) as Grand'mere Marie
- Interrupted Melody (1955) as Madame Gilly
- Daddy Long Legs (1955) as Madame Sevanne (uncredited)
- The Sun Also Rises (1957) as Mme. Blanche, Concierge (uncredited)
- The Young Lions (1958) as French Woman (uncredited)
- Kings Go Forth (1958) as Mme. Brieux
- The Man Who Understood Women (1959) as French Maid (uncredited)
- Can-Can (1960) as League president
