= Paris After Dark =

1943 film by Léonide Moguy

- Directed by: Léonide Moguy
- Written by: Harold Buchman; Georges Kessel
- Produced by: André Daven
- Starring: George Sanders; Philip Dorn; Brenda Marshall; Madeleine Lebeau
- Cinematography: Lucien N. Andriot
- Edited by: Nick DeMaggio
- Music by: Hugo Friedhofer
- Production company: 20th Century Fox
- Distributed by: 20th Century Fox
- Release date: October 15, 1943
- Running time: 85 minutes
- Country: United States
- Language: English

Paris After Dark is a 1943 American war drama film directed by Léonide Moguy and starring George Sanders, Philip Dorn and Brenda Marshall. It portrays the activities of the French resistance in occupied Paris during World War II. The portrayal of the resistance was modeled on the Communist-led Front National, possibly due to the influence of screenwriter Harold Buchman who was known for his left-wing views.

The film's sets were designed by art directors James Basevi and John Ewing.

== Plot ==
French underground activists are secretly printing and distributing leaflets against the Nazis. Many of them work at a factory which is producing German tanks. They are encouraging covert acts of sabotage in the factory. A factory worker is shot and killed after he is caught distributing leaflets. His girlfriend Colette runs a restaurant and has to pretend not to care when two of her German customers tell her about the murder.

A nurse in the hospital, Yvonne Blanchard, and a doctor, Dr. Andre Marbel, are ringleaders. They arrange secret meetings at the doctor's house and in the basement of Colette's restaurant. Yvonne's husband, Jean Blanchard, a former French soldier, is released from a German prison camp. He has been broken in spirit and only wants to cooperate with the Germans to preserve his family. He also sees Dr. Marbel and finds out he has a terminal pulmonary condition. He finds some pamphlets hidden in his wife's dresser drawer. She lies to him that she didn't know what they were and only kept them for another nurse at the hospital. He burns them and tells her she should turn in the other nurse.

The German commander who is in charge of the factory decides to send the machines and most of the workers to Germany to cut down on the sabotage. He tells the doctor because he wants him to vaccinate the workers. The doctor calls an emergency underground meeting at his house. Yvonne attends, telling Jean she has to go back to the hospital to participate in an emergency surgery. He follows her and sees that she's going to the doctor's house, not the hospital, and gets jealous. When she comes home, he slaps her, and she goes to stay in the hospital. The doctor wants to tell Jean about the meeting to alleviate his jealous fears, but Yvonne doesn't want to endanger all the people at the meeting. The next morning, she is helping the doctor give the vaccinations when she sees her little brother George in the line. Later that night at home, George declares he's going to leave France and go fight with De Gaulle. His mother and father and Jean try to dissuade him. Jean tells the barber Luigi about it, not knowing Luigi is taking money from the Germans as an informer.

There is another meeting, this time in Colette's basement. Luigi is flirting with her and tries to follow her into an anteroom, which has a secret passage to the basement from the closet. She signals to the group to disperse. Jean runs into Luigi leaving and learns that Yvonne had come by earlier. He then meets Yvonne and Dr. Marbel in the alley as they are leaving the clandestine meeting and is further convinced they are having an affair.

That night at home, Yvonne encounters George with the family gun. She takes it away from him. He protests he will need it when he runs away. She asks with whom he is going to escape France. He says he has talked to some friends and “they know people who will help us.” She is skeptical about the plan and says not to trust it if they are from the real Underground.

The next day, Jean encounters George leaving and is unable to stop him. He watches from the window as a Gestapo agent leaves Luigi's barbershop and follows George and his friends. Then he knows that Luigi is a traitor and that he is the one who gave him information. George and his friends are apprehended on the road and taken back to the factory where the workers have learned the Allies have landed in northern Africa and commenced a work stoppage. George makes an inflammatory speech and is shot and killed by the Colonel Pirosh who has massed his soldiers to quell the protest at the factory.

Pirosh himself is shot but no one knows by whom. 50 factory workers are taken into Gestapo custody.

He is wounded and promises if the doctor operates on him and the operation is a success, he will free all of the workers. The doctor operates. Nurse Yvonne assists but, at one point, hands the doctor the wrong instrument, hoping to kill the patient. Then the doctor insists she hand him the correct instrument and she does.

Luigi again appears at Colette's restaurant, still trying to flirt with her. Jean follows him there and has a fight with him, knocks him through the false door at the back of the closet, down the basement steps. Jean eventually chokes Luigi to death. Then he looks around the basement and figures out this is the Underground headquarters. Colette and some other Underground resisters appear after she called on them for help.

Jean tells them he took care of the quisling, and they should be more careful. They tell him about the meetings at Dr. Marbel's house and he realizes his wife is innocent of what he was suspecting about her. They welcome him back to the fight, saying, “Resistance to fascism is not just for the workers. It belongs to everybody.”

The Nazi colonel survives and demands all 50 of the workers should be killed unless they turn over the man who shot him. The doctor protests to no avail that he is breaking his promise. Jean leaves a note for Yvonne saying that he was the one who shot Colonel Pirosh. He also confesses to the doctor and some other members of the Underground. He says he is going to turn himself in to save the other workers. He asks the doctor to take care of Yvonne. He shows the doctor the gun he used, and the doctor confirms it uses the same caliber of bullet that he took out of the Colonel. It's the same family gun that Yvonne took away from George.

The doctor says there is a British plane coming to take the leaders of the Underground to safety that night and Yvonne will be on it.

Yvonne comes to the doctor's house to stop Jean from turning himself in, but he has already gone. She tells the doctor she did it with the family gun. She wants to go to the Gestapo herself to save Jean. He tells her about Jean's lung condition and that he would not have lived very long anyway.

Together they make a secret transmission to Paris saying that France is still fighting and eventually the Germans will lose. Jean is able to hear the broadcast while he's standing before the Nazi police.

== Cast ==
- George Sanders as Dr. Andre Marbel
- Philip Dorn as Jean Blanchard
- Brenda Marshall as Yvonne Blanchard
- Madeleine Lebeau as Collette
- Marcel Dalio as Luigi - Quisling Barber
- Robert Lewis as Colonel Pirosh
- Henry Rowland as Captain Franck
- Louis Borel as Picard
- Curt Bois as Max
- Christiane Tourneur as Max's Wife
- Michael Visaroff as Paul
- John Wengraf as Mannheim
- Raymond Roe as George Benoit
- Jean Del Val as Papa Benoit
- Ann Codee as Mme. Benoit
- Gaston Glass as Soldier
- Guy Kingsford as English Pilot
- Frank Arnold as French Soldier
- John Beverly as German Detective
- Walter Bonn as German Detective
- Eugene Borden as Central Committee Member
- Peter Lawford as Frenchman

== Bibliography ==
- Dick, Bernard F. The Star-spangled Screen: The American World War II Film. University Press of Kentucky, 1996.
- McLaughlin, Robert and Parry, Sally. We'll Always Have the Movies: American Cinema during World War II. University Press of Kentucky, 2006.
