= Patrick Murphy Malin =

American activist (1903–1964)

Patrick Murphy Malin (1903 – December 13, 1964) was an American activist and administrator who followed Roger Nash Baldwin as the second Executive Director of the American Civil Liberties Union.

== Early life ==
Malin was born in Joplin, Missouri in 1903, the son of a banker. He entered the family business at age ten, and was expected to eventually become president of the bank. However, Woodrow Wilson's World War I speeches gave him a desire to travel and get a government job. He attended the University of Pennsylvania's Wharton School, graduating as valedictorian in 1924.

== Career ==
From 1924 to 1929, Malin served as private secretary to International YMCA director Sherwood Eddy. While on his first trip abroad, he met Caroline Biddle. The two would wait four years, allowing Biddle to graduate from college, before they married. In 1930, Malin joined the economics faculty at Swarthmore College, where he would remain for twenty years until taking the job with the ACLU. During World War II, however, he worked for the Intergovernmental Committee on Refugees, headquartered in London. In September 1940, he was dispatched by President Franklin D. Roosevelt to issue visas to the Jewish refugees of the S.S. Quanza when it stopped in Norfolk, Virginia to refuel.

== ACLU executive director ==
Malin had been an ACLU member since the Twenties, but had not thought of working for the organization until shortly before he was selected to succeed Baldwin. He served twelve years in that position. Malin oversaw a tremendous increase in the ACLU's membership, and established its present-day chapter structure, but faced criticism from those who said that the organization had not aggressively confronted Joseph McCarthy.

== Later life ==
In 1962, Malin left the ACLU to become president of Robert College (now Boğaziçi University) in Istanbul. He died there on December 13, 1964.
