= Victoria Redel =

American poet and writer (born 1959)

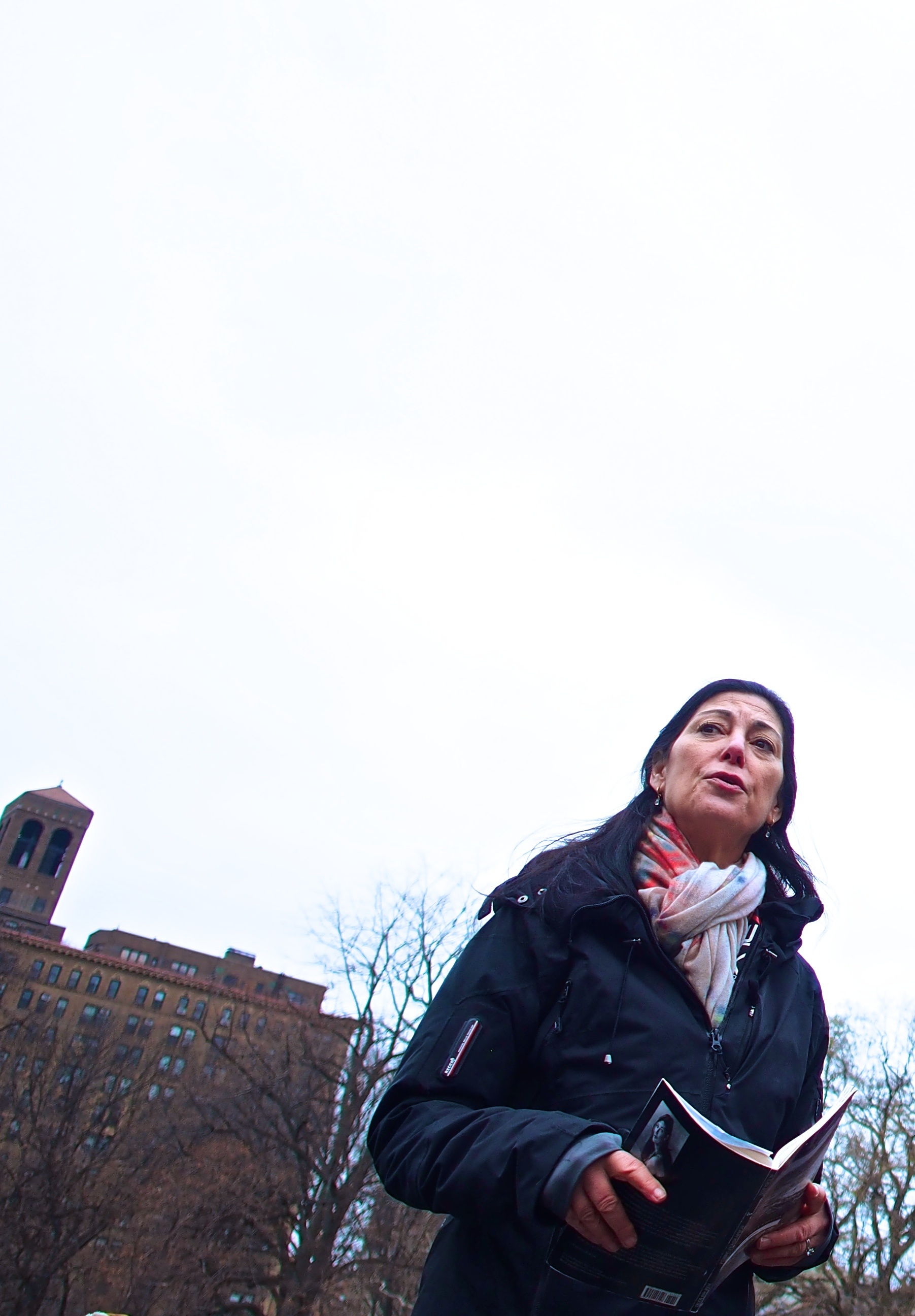
Victoria Redel attends a rally at Washington Square, New York in December 2014

Victoria Redel (born 1959) is an American poet and fiction writer who lives in New York City. She is the author of six books of fiction: Before Everything, Make Me Do Things, The Border of Truth, Loverboy, Where the Road Bottoms Out, and I Am You, and four books of poetry: Paradise, Woman Without Umbrella, Swoon and Already the World. She has taught at Columbia University, Vermont College and is currently on the faculty of Sarah Lawrence College. She has two sons.

== Awards and honors ==
Redel has received awards in fiction and poetry including fellowships from the Guggenheim Foundation, the National Endowment for the Arts, the Fine Arts Work Center. She won the Tom and Stan Wick Poetry award for Already the World and the S. Mariela Gable Award for Loverboy. Swoon was a finalist for the James Laughlin Award.

Her novel Loverboy was a Los Angeles Best Book. The novel was adapted into a feature-length film of the same name directed by Kevin Bacon and starring Kyra Sedgwick. Other actors in the film include Oliver Platt, Marisa Tomei, Matt Dillon, and Sandra Bullock.

== Background ==
Redel is a first generation American born into a Jewish family of Belgian-Polish, Romanian and Egyptian descent. Her mother, Natalie Soltanitzky, a noted ballet teacher and Director of the Ballet Guild School of Westchester, was born in Romania, coming to New York in 1942 after spending two years in Paris under German Occupation. Her father, Irving Redel, left Belgium in 1940. He and his parents were among the 86 passengers on the ship Quanza who were initially refused entry into the United States and Mexico and were about to be returned to Lisbon. The situation of the Quanza became the setting for Redel’s novel The Border of Truth. Victoria Redel is the youngest of three daughters. She grew up in Scarsdale, New York, is a graduate of Dartmouth College and received an MFA in poetry from Columbia University.

For her short-story collection Make Me Do Things, which was released in 2013, she had a cinematic book trailer produced.
