= Madeleine Lebeau =

French actress (1923–2016)

- Lebeau singing "La Marseillaise" in Casablanca
- Born: Marie Madeleine Berthe Lebeau; 10 June 1923; Antony, Hauts-de-Seine, France
- Died: 1 May 2016 (aged 92); Estepona, Málaga, Spain
- Occupation: Actress
- Years active: 1939–1970
- Notable work: Casablanca, 8½
- Spouses: Marcel Dalio (m. 1939; div. 1942) Tullio Pinelli (m. 1988; died 2009)

Marie Madeleine Berthe Lebeau (French: [maʁi madlɛn bɛʁt ləbo]; 10 June 1923 – 1 May 2016) was a French film actress who also appeared in American films, most notably Casablanca.

== Early life ==
Lebeau married actor Marcel Dalio in 1939; it was his second marriage. They had met while performing a play together. She had already appeared in her first film, an uncredited role as a student in the melodrama Young Girls in Trouble (Jeunes filles en détresse, 1939). In June 1940, Lebeau and Dalio (who was Jewish) fled Paris ahead of the invading German Army and reached Lisbon. They are presumed to have received transit visas from Aristides de Sousa Mendes, allowing them to enter Spain and journey on to Portugal. It took them two months to obtain visas to Chile.

However, when their ship, the S.S. Quanza, stopped in Mexico, they were stranded, along with around 200 other passengers, when the Chilean visas they had purchased turned out to be forgeries. Eventually, they were able to get temporary Canadian passports and entered the United States. Lebeau made her Hollywood debut in Hold Back the Dawn (1941), which featured Charles Boyer and Olivia de Havilland in the leading roles. The following year, she appeared in the Errol Flynn movie Gentleman Jim, a biography of Irish-American boxer James J. Corbett.

Lebeau learned English during the seven-week stay with Dalio on the S.S. Quanza while it was seeking a port for landing.

== Casablanca ==
Later that year she was cast in the role of Yvonne, Humphrey Bogart's character's discarded mistress, in Casablanca. Warner Bros. signed her to a $100-a-week contract for twenty-six weeks to be in a number of films. On 22 June, while she was filming her scenes in Casablanca, her husband, Marcel Dalio, who played Emil the croupier in the same film, filed for divorce in Los Angeles on the ground of desertion. They divorced in 1942. Shortly before the release of the film, Warner Bros. terminated her contract. After Joy Page died in April 2008, Lebeau was the last surviving credited cast member of Casablanca.

She told Charlotte Chandler, author of a biography of female lead Ingrid Bergman, in the 1990s: "It wasn't that I was cut out, it was because they kept changing the script, and each time they changed it, I had less of a part". "It was not personal, but I was so disappointed".

Lebeau's most notable moments in Casablanca are during the scene when French nationals sing "La Marseillaise", drowning out a group of German soldiers singing "Die Wacht am Rhein". The camera captures the (genuine) tears on her face, and later at the end of the anthem when she cries out "Vive la France ! Vive la démocratie!" France had fallen to Nazi forces, and many of the actors performing in the scene were real-life refugees from Europe.

== After Casablanca ==
Following Casablanca, Lebeau appeared in two further American films. The first was a large role in the war drama Paris After Dark (1943), with her former husband. The following year, Lebeau had a smaller role in Music for Millions. Courtesy of MGM, Lebeau helped entertain the troops at Camp Roberts, California in 1943, starring in The Desert Song. She appeared on Broadway in the play The French Touch in a production directed by René Clair. After the end of World War II, Lebeau returned to France and continued her acting career. She appeared in Les Chouans (The Royalists, 1947) and worked in Great Britain, appearing in a film with Jean Simmons, Cage of Gold (1950).

== Later years ==
She would appear in 20 more films, mainly French, including La Parisienne (1957), with Brigitte Bardot as the star, as well as in Federico Fellini's 8½ (1963). Lebeau's last two films were Spanish productions in 1965.

In 1988, she married Italian screenwriter Tullio Pinelli who had contributed to the script of 8½.

=== Death ===
Lebeau died on 1 May 2016 in Estepona, Spain, aged 92, after breaking her thigh bone. French culture minister Audrey Azoulay said of Madelaine Lebeau after her death: "She was a free woman who lived by her own rules, totally inhabiting the roles entrusted to her by leading directors. She will forever be the face of the French resistance."

== Filmography ==
Year	Title	Role	Notes
1939	Jeunes filles en détresse (Girls in Distress)	Une élève de la pension	Uncredited
1941	Hold Back the Dawn	Anni	
1942	Gentleman Jim	Anna Held	
1942	Casablanca	Yvonne	
1943	Paris After Dark	Collette	
1944	Music for Millions	Jane	
1947	The Royalists	Marie de Verneuil	
1948	The Secret of Monte Cristo	Marguerite Vigouroux	
1950	Cage of Gold	Marie	
1950	Et moi j'te dis qu'elle t'a fait d'l'oeil!	Aurélie Lambrusque	
1951	Sins of Madeleine	Malou	
1951	Paris Still Sings	Gisèle	
1952	Fortuné de Marseille	Tonia	
1953	L'étrange amazone	Eliane	
1953	Mandat d'amener	Françoise Delanglade	
1953	Légère et court vêtue (Lightly and Shortly Dressed)	Jacqueline Lorette / Kiki	
1953	L'aventurière du Tchad (The Adventurer of Chad)	Fanny Lacour	
1954	Si Versailles m'était conté (Royal Affairs in Versailles)	Une dame de la cour	Uncredited
1954	Quay of Blondes	Nelly	
1954	Cadet Rousselle	Marguerite de Beaufort	
1955	Napoléon	Emilie Pellapra	
1955	La pícara molinera	Jacqueline	
1956	Le pays d'où je viens (The Country I Come From)	Adrienne Terreau	
1957	La Parisienne	Monique Wilson	
1958	Life Together	Peggy	
1959	Vous n'avez rien à déclarer?	Gloria Frontignac	
1959	Le chemin des écoliers (Way of Youth)	Flora	
1963	8½	Madeleine, the French actress	
1964	Gunmen of the Rio Grande	Jennie Lee	
1964	Angélique, Marquise des Anges	La Grande Demoiselle	
1965	La vuelta		
1967	La bouquetière des innocents	Marie de Médicis	TV movie
