= The Royalists =

1947 French historical drama film

- Directed by: Henri Calef
- Written by: Charles Spaak; Pierre Brive
- Based on: Les Chouans by Honoré de Balzac
- Produced by: Charles Legrand
- Starring: Jean Marais; Madeleine Robinson; Madeleine Lebeau
- Cinematography: Claude Renoir
- Edited by: Jacques Grassi; Raymonde Nevers
- Music by: Joseph Kosma
- Production company: Productions Georges Legrand
- Distributed by: Les Films Corona
- Release date: 20 March 1947
- Running time: 109 minutes
- Country: France
- Language: French
- Box office: 2,735,821 admissions (France)

The Royalists (French: Les Chouans) is a 1947 French historical drama film directed by Henri Calef and starring Jean Marais, Madeleine Robinson and Madeleine Lebeau. It is an adaptation of Honoré de Balzac's 1829 novel Les Chouans. It was shot at the Epinay Studios of Eclair and on location at the Rocher-Portail Castle near Fougères. The film's sets were designed by the art director Robert Dumesnil. A later film version, titled Chouans! (1988), was directed by Philippe de Broca.

== Cast ==
- Jean Marais as Marquis of Montauran
- Madeleine Robinson as Madam du Gua
- Madeleine Lebeau as Marie-Nathalie de Verneuil
- Marcel Herrand as Corentin
- Pierre Dux as Hulot
- Paul Amiot as Count of Beauvent
- Roland Armontel as Beau Pied
- Jean Brochard as Marche à Terre
- Guy Favières as Galope Chopine
- Georges Paulais as Marquis of Guénic
- Jacques Charon as Lieutenant Merle
- Louis Seigner as the priest Gudin
- Léo Lapara as Pille-Miche
- Howard Vernon as Capitain Gérard

== Bibliography ==
- Oscherwitz, Dayna & Higgins, MaryEllen. The A to Z of French Cinema. Scarecrow Press, 2009.
