= SS Quanza =

Portuguese refugee/passenger/cargo ship

Quanza
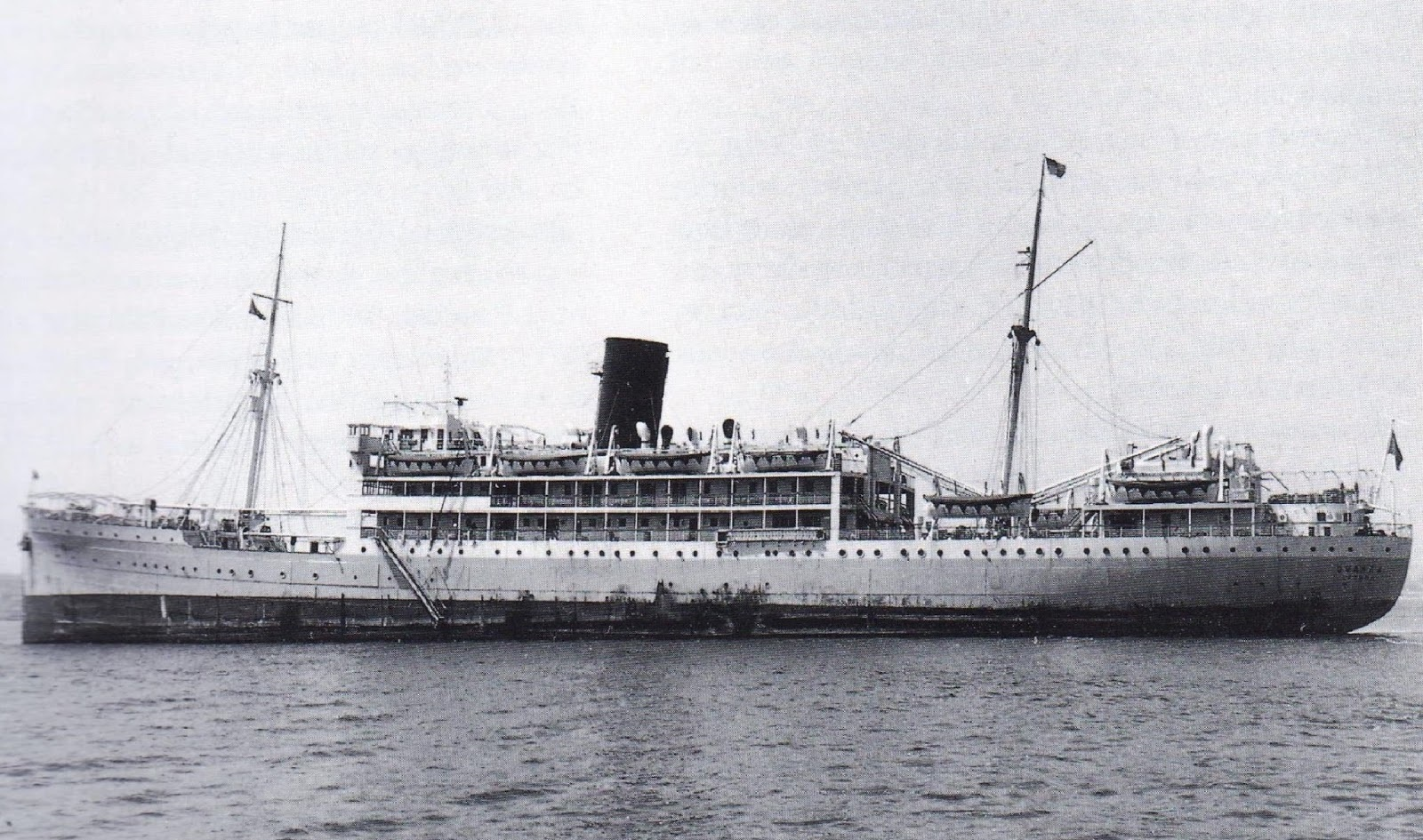
- Side view of SS Quanza

History
- Name: Portugal
- Owner: Companhia Nacional de Navegação, Lisbon
- Port of registry: Lisbon
- Route: Lisbon to Southern Africa
- Builder: Blohm & Voss, Hamburg
- Yard number: 480
- Launched: 1 June 1929
- Completed: 5 September 1929
- Renamed: Quanza (1929)
- Fate: Scrapped 1968 in Spain

General characteristics
- Type: Passenger-cargo
- Tonnage: 6,636 gross register tons (GRT); 3,944 net register tons (NRT)
- Length: 418.2 ft (127.5 m)
- Beam: 52.6 ft (16.0 m)
- Depth: 28.6 ft (8.7 m)
- Propulsion: Twin screw
- Speed: 14 knots (26 km/h; 16 mph)

SS Quanza was a World War II-era Portuguese passenger-cargo ship, best known for carrying 317 people, many of them refugees, from Nazi-occupied Europe to North America in 1940. At least 100 of its passengers were Jewish.

== Early history ==
Launched as Portugal, the vessel went into service in 1929 as Quanza. Her normal route was from Lisbon, Portugal, to Angola, South Africa and Mozambique, though some voyages were made to South America.

== August – September 1940 voyage ==
In August 1940, Quanza was chartered by a group of passengers seeking to flee Europe, including French actors Marcel Dalio and Madeleine Lebeau. The passengers traveled with a variety of visas, some of which were forged. Because the captain doubted the validity of the visas, he required that many passengers also buy return tickets on the likelihood that no country would admit them. The ship left Lisbon on 9 August, beginning its first trans-Atlantic voyage. After a difficult crossing that included a hurricane, the ship arrived in New York City on 19 August. 196 passengers disembarked, 66 of whom were American citizens. One of these was Dr. Stephan Kuttner (1907–1996), who later became one of the most important scholars of medieval canon law in the world. He was a Roman Catholic, but his ancestry was German Jewish. He was fortunate enough to have a passport from the Vatican for himself and his family. The remaining 121 passengers were denied entry, including nearly all of the Jewish passengers. Quanza proceeded to Veracruz, Mexico, where it arrived on 30 August. Only 35 passengers were allowed to disembark, leaving 86 on board, mostly Belgian Jews. The ship was then ordered to return to Europe, causing despair among the remaining passengers.

The ship made a brief stop for coal in Norfolk, Virginia, in the US. During the stop, Jacob Morewitz, a Jewish maritime lawyer from Newport News, filed a lawsuit in federal court on behalf of four of the refugees, suing the Portuguese National Line for $100,000 for breach of contract. The suit held Quanza in port for six days, during which time Jewish leaders, including Rabbi Stephen Wise of the World Jewish Congress and Cecilia Razovsky of the National Council of Jewish Women, lobbied for the remaining passengers' admittance. Meanwhile, Quanza's passengers became so desperate that one leapt from the ship to swim for land; though he reached shore successfully, he was quickly apprehended and returned to the ship. Following the incident, the ship's captain posted armed guards on the decks.

When First Lady Eleanor Roosevelt was informed by Jewish-American associations of the situation, she appealed to her husband, President Franklin D. Roosevelt, who dispatched State Department official Patrick Murphy Malin to investigate the passengers' status. Malin designated all 86 as political refugees and issued them visas, though six chose voluntarily to return to Europe. The eighty who remained in the US entered the country on 14 September. Some of the refugees later sent President Roosevelt roses with a note reading, "with everlasting gratitude for your humane gesture, from the refugees of the SS Quanza."

Assistant Secretary of State Breckinridge Long, who was nominally in charge of refugee issues, was enraged by the granting of visas to the Quanza refugees and insisted that it must not occur again. Long renewed his efforts to block immigration, and by mid-1941, almost no war refugees were allowed into the US.

== Fictional representations ==
In 1991, Susan Lieberman and Jacob Morewitz's grandson Stephen Morewitz wrote a play about the events titled Steamship Quanza. Victoria Redel, whose father and grandmother had been on the voyage, published a novel about the ship's crossing in 2007 titled The Border of Truth.

== Non-fictional representations ==
"Nobody Wants Us" Emmy nominated PBS documentary that chronicles the experiences of three teenagers that were imprisoned on SS Quanza in the port of Hampton Roads, Virginia. Along with 83 other refugees, they were hoping to be allowed on American soil — where millions of others in distress had safely landed before them. The film also highlights individuals who helped the refugees escape the Holocaust.

== See also ==
- MS St. Louis
