= Harry-Max =

French actor

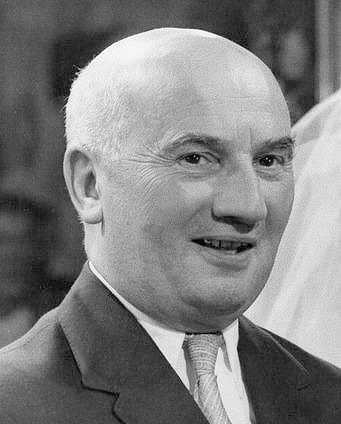
- Born: 23 November 1901; Paris, France
- Died: 13 March 1979 (aged 77); Ivry-sur-Seine, France
- Occupation: Actor
- Years active: 1938–1975

Harry-Max (born Maxime Louis Charles Dichamp; 23 November 1901 – 13 March 1979) was a French film actor. He appeared in more than eighty films from 1938 to 1975.

== Filmography ==
Film
Year	Title	Role	Notes
1938	Monsieur Coccinelle		Uncredited
1947	Six Hours to Lose	Minor Role	Uncredited
1947	Man About Town	Un spectateur	Uncredited
1947	Amours, délices et orgues		
1947	The Crowned Fish Tavern	Un mécanicien du bateau	
1947	Four Knaves	Monsieur Dubois - l'entomologiste	Uncredited
1947	Monsieur Vincent	Jeanne - la jeune soeur novice	Uncredited
1948	White as Snow	Le juge d'instruction	
1948	L'assassin est à l'écoute		
1948	Three Boys, One Girl		
1948	The Heart on the Sleeve	Musard - le comptable	
1949	Bal Cupidon		
1949	The Nude Woman	Le critique	
1949	The Farm of Seven Sins		Uncredited
1949	Millionnaires d'un jour		Uncredited
1950	Lady Paname		
1950	Cartouche, roi de Paris		
1950	Mademoiselle Josette, My Woman	Le fondé de pouvoirs	
1951	The Beautiful Image		Uncredited
1951	La vie est un jeu		
1951	The Prettiest Sin in the World	Le patron	
1951	Never Two Without Three	Le maître d'hôtel	
1951	La Poison	Henri	Uncredited
1951	My Wife Is Formidable	Le veilleur de nuit à l'hôtel	Uncredited
1952	Massacre en dentelles		
1952	Fanfan la Tulipe	Minor Role	Uncredited
1952	Foyer perdu		
1952	The Happiest of Men	Moulinot	
1953	Wonderful Mentality	Le commissaire	
1953	The Slave	L'imprésario	
1953	The Most Wanted Man	Le Barman	Uncredited
1954	Crainquebille	Le Président	
1954	On Trial	L'avocat	
1954	Cadet Rousselle		
1955	The Heroes Are Tired		
1955	Je suis un sentimental	Le typo	
1955	Lola Montès	Man in the box	Uncredited
1955	Milord l'Arsouille		
1956	Hello Smile !	Double-Note	Uncredited
1956	Mon curé champion du régiment		
1956	Law of the Streets	Le commissaire de police	
1956	The Babes in the Secret Service	Le médecin de la prison	
1956	Short Head	Cyril Mauvoisin, l'entraîneur	
1956	Paris Palace Hotel	Le septuagénaire	Uncredited
1956	Mitsou ou Comment l'esprit vient aux filles...	Le concierge du 'Music-Hall'	
1957	La polka des menottes	Le chef de cabinet du ministre	
1957	À pied, à cheval et en voiture		Uncrtedited
1957	La Parisienne	L'ambassadeur	
1958	White Cargo	Un employé de l'imprimerie	Uncredited
1958	Seventh Heaven	Le maire à Cannes	Uncredited
1958	Montparnasse 19	Le docteur	Uncredited
1958	Girl and the River	Le juge de paix	
1958	Miss Pigalle		
1958	A Dog, a Mouse, and a Sputnik	Le médecin	
1958	Clara et les méchants	Le cafetier	
1959	Le petit prof	Un Mouriot	
1959	La bête à l'affût	Me Darcet, le notaire	
1959	Les affreux		
1960	Certains l'aiment froide	Le commissaire	
1960	Pierrot la tendresse	Le notaire	
1961	Le Tracassin	Crollebois	
1962	Comment réussir en amour		Uncredited
1962	Les culottes rouges	Le médecin militaire	Uncredited
1963	Maigret Sees Red	Curtis	
1964	The Adventures of Salavin	Un clochard	
1964	Comment épouser un premier ministre	Le père de Marion	
1968	Stolen Kisses	Monsieur Henri	
1969	Hibernatus	Le plus vieil ami de Paul	
1969	Appelez-moi Mathilde	Le compice	
1970	Caïn de nulle part	Le père	
1970	Céleste	Le préposé des bains-douches	
1971	Le Chat	Le retraité	
1971	Les Assassins de l'ordre	Moulard	
1971	Mais qui donc m'a fait ce bébé?		
1972	We Won't Grow Old Together	Père de Jean	
1972	Le Rempart des béguines	Le grand-père	
