= Par la fenêtre =

Par la fenetre
- Directed by: Gilles Grangier
- Written by: Jacques Alain
- Starring: Bourvil; Suzy Delair; Michèle Philippe
- Cinematography: Maurice Barry
- Edited by: Andrée Danis
- Music by: Georges Van Parys; Étienne Lorin
- Distributed by: Ciné Sélection
- Release date: 1948
- Running time: 85 mins
- Country: France
- Language: French
- Box office: 3,213,162 admissions (France)

Par la Fenetre is a 1948 French comedy film starring Bourvil. It was a sizeable box office hit.

It was shot at the Saint-Maurice Studios in Paris.

== Plot ==
A man goes to Paris and finds work as a painter.

== Reception ==
The film was the fifteenth most popular movie at the French box office in 1948. It ranked after The Charterhouse of Parma, Operation Swallow: The Battle for Heavy Water, Clochemerle, To the Eyes of Memory, Les Casse Pieds, Les Aventures des Pieds-Nickelés, Forever Amber, Blanc comme neige, Notorious, Ali Baba and the 40 Thieves, Man to Men, The Ironmaster, How I Lost the War and The Bandit of Sherwood Forest.
