= The Chocolate Girl (1950 film) =

1950 film

- Directed by: André Berthomieu
- Written by: Paul Gavault (play); André Hornez; André Berthomieu
- Starring: Giselle Pascal; Claude Dauphin; Henri Genès
- Cinematography: Charles Suin
- Edited by: Louisette Hautecoeur; Henri Taverna
- Music by: Paul Misraki
- Production company: Hoche Productions
- Distributed by: Les Films Corona
- Release date: 3 March 1950
- Country: France
- Language: French

The Chocolate Girl (French: La petite chocolatière) is a 1950 French musical comedy film directed by André Berthomieu and starring Giselle Pascal, Claude Dauphin and Henri Genès. It is based on a play by Paul Gavault. An earlier adaptation The Chocolate Girl was released in 1932.

It was shot at the Saint-Maurice Studios in Paris and on location around the city. The art director Raymond Nègre designed the film's sets.

== Main cast ==
- Giselle Pascal as Benjamine Lapistolle
- Claude Dauphin as Paul Normand
- Henri Genès as Félicien Bédarride
- Jeannette Batti as Rosette
- Bernard Lajarrige as Raoul Pinglet
- Georges Lannes as Lapistolle
- Henri Crémieux as Mingassol
- Paulette Dubost as Julie
- Charles Bouillaud as Le maître d'hôtel
- Max Elloy as Le garçon
- Colette Georges as Simone
- Jean Hébey as Le fêtard
- Gaston Orbal as Eugène

== Bibliography ==
- Goble, Alan. The Complete Index to Literary Sources in Film. Walter de Gruyter, 1999.
