= Dominique Nohain =

French actor, dramatist, screenwriter and theatre director

- Born: Dominique Legrand; 8 July 1925; Paris
- Died: 30 May 2017 (aged 91)
- Occupations: actor, dramatist, screenwriter and theatre director

Dominique Nohain (8 July 1925 – 30 May 2017) was a French actor, dramatist, screenwriter and theatre director. He was the son of Jean Nohain and thus cousin with Jean-Claude Dauphin.

== Biography ==
In 1944, he joined the Leclerc Division and took part in the Liberation of Paris with his father.

He began a career as an actor in cinema and theater and also appeared in some of his father's shows. With André Leclerc and Pierre Louis, he was the co-writer of the famous 36 chandelles television variety show of the 1950s. He later became a playwright and directed the Théâtre Tristan-Bernard.

== Filmography ==
Cinema

- 1944 : Bifur 3 by Maurice Cam
- 1945 : Dawn Devils by Yves Allégret : Simon dit Chouchou
- 1946 : Mensonges by Jean Stelli
- 1946 : Loves, Delights and Organs by André Berthomieu (plus adaptation) : Étienne
- 1948 : The Firemen's Ball by André Berthomieu
- 1957 : C'est arrivé à 36 chandelles by Henri Diamant-Berger : himself

Television

- 1976 : Au théâtre ce soir : Seul le poisson rouge est au courant by Jean Barbier and Dominique Nohain, mise-en-scene Dominique Nohain, directed by Pierre Sabbagh, théâtre Édouard VII
- 1979 : Au théâtre ce soir : Crime à la clef by Alain Bernier and Roger Maridat, mise-en-scène Jean-Paul Cisife, directed by Pierre Sabbagh, Théâtre Marigny
- 1979 : Au théâtre ce soir : Le Troisième Témoin by Dominique Nohain, mise-en-scène by the author, directed by Pierre Sabbagh, Théâtre Marigny
- 1980 : Au théâtre ce soir : Comédie pour un meurtre by Jean-Jacques Bricaire and Maurice Lasaygues, mise-en-scène Dominique Nohain, directed by Pierre Sabbagh, Théâtre Marigny

== Theatre ==
=== Author ===
- Le Troisième témoin
- L'Oiseau de bonheur
- Seul le poisson rouge est au courant (co author : Jean Barbier)
- L'Escargot écossais

=== Actor ===
- 1952 : Défense de doubler by Dominique Nohain, directed by Émile Dars - Théâtre Les Célestins, Lyon
- 1957 : Auguste by Raymond Castans, directed by Jean Wall, Théâtre des Nouveautés
- 1961 : Deux pieds dans la tombe by Frédéric Valmain after Jack Lee, directed by Jean Dejoux - Théâtre Charles de Rochefort
- 1961 : Coralie et Cie by Maurice Hennequin and Albin Valabrègue, directed by Jean Le Poulain - Théâtre Sarah-Bernhardt
- 1964 : Le Troisième Témoin by Dominique Nohain, mise-en-scène by the author - Théâtre Charles de Rochefort
- 1965 : L'Oiseau du bonheur by Dominique Nohain, mise-en-scène by the author - Théâtre de l'Ambigu-Comique
- 1973 : Seul le poisson rouge est au courant by Dominique Nohain and Jean Barbier, directed by Dominique Nohain - Théâtre Charles de Rochefort
- 1974 : L'Escargot écossais by Dominique Nohain, directed by the author - Théâtre Charles de Rochefort
- 1978 : Crime à la clef by Alain Bernier and Roger Maridat, directed by Jean-Paul Cisife - Théâtre Tristan-Bernard
- 1979 : Comédie pour un meurtre by Jean-Jacques Bricaire and Maurice Lasaygues, directed by Dominique Nohain - Théâtre Tristan-Bernard

=== Theatre director ===
- 1964 : Le Troisième Témoin by Dominique Nohain - Théâtre Charles de Rochefort
- 1977 : L'Oiseau du bonheur by Dominique Nohain - Théâtre Tristan-Bernard
- 1979 : Comédie pour un meurtre by Jean-Jacques Bricaire and Maurice Lasaygues - Théâtre Tristan-Bernard
- 1983 : Erreur judiciaire by Maurice Blum - Théâtre Tristan-Bernard
- 1983 : Balle de match by Alain Bernier and Roger Maridat - Théâtre Tristan-Bernard
