= The Firemen's Ball (1948 film) =

1948 film

- Directed by: André Berthomieu
- Written by: André Berthomieu; Jean Nohain
- Based on: The Firemen's Ball by Jean Nohain
- Produced by: Gilbert Cohen-Seat; Claude Dauphin; Robert Dorfmann
- Starring: Claude Dauphin; Paulette Dubost; Dominique Nohain
- Cinematography: Jean Bachelet
- Edited by: Henri Taverna
- Music by: Georges Derveaux
- Production companies: Maítrise Artisanale de l'Industrie Cinematographique; Silver Films
- Distributed by: Les Films Corona
- Release date: 20 October 1948
- Running time: 95 minutes
- Country: France
- Language: French

The Firemen's Ball (French: Le bal des pompiers) is a 1948 French comedy drama film directed by André Berthomieu and starring Claude Dauphin, Paulette Dubost and Dominique Nohain. The film's sets were designed by the art director Raymond Nègre.

== Synopsis ==
From the perspective of the 1944 Liberation of France the film depicts three generations of the Grégeois family and their military service for their country during difficult years. The grandfather was wounded in the First World War, his son is taken prisoner during the Fall of France in 1940 and the grandson is killed in action fighting with the Free French to liberate his homeland.

== Cast ==
- Claude Dauphin as Camille, Olivier and Henri Grégeois
- Paulette Dubost as Germaine
- Dominique Nohain as Michel
- Michèle Philippe as Paméla Noël
- Henri Crémieux as Fatafia
- Blanche Denège as Cécile Grégeois
- Paul Faivre as Berton
- Christian Simon as Marceau
- André Versini as Marcellin
- Robert Rollis as Raymond
- Charles Bouillaud as Coquillard
- Frédéric O'Brady as L'imprésario
- Jo Dest as Dr. Frantz
- Robert Arnoux as Touvoir
- Pierre-Louis as Badin
- Jean Valmence as Paulo

== Bibliography ==
- Goble, Alan. The Complete Index to Literary Sources in Film. Walter de Gruyter, 1999.
- Rège, Philippe. Encyclopedia of French Film Directors, Volume 1. Scarecrow Press, 2009.
