= Blanche Denège =

French actress (1876–1957)

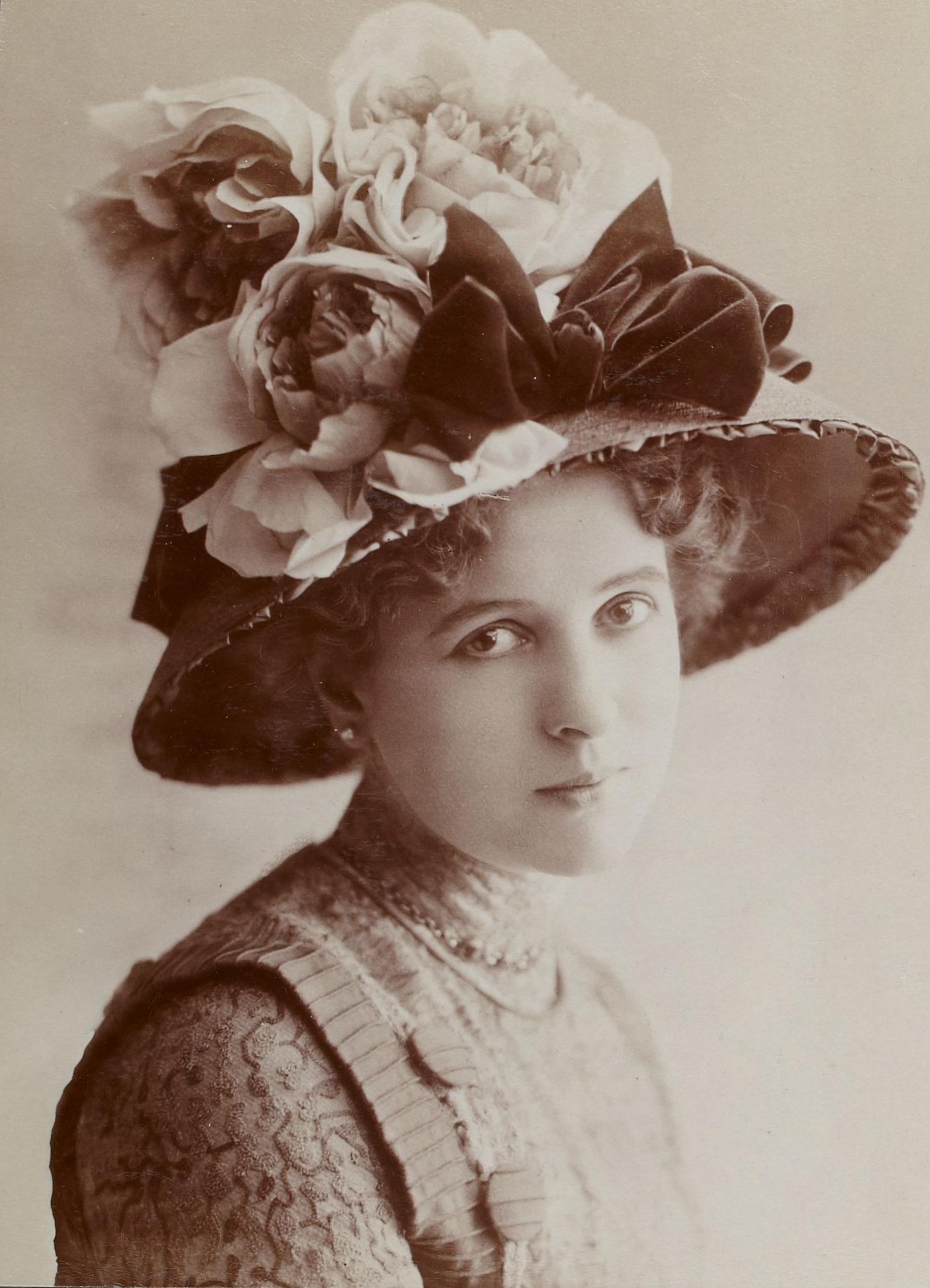
- Born: Jeanne Céleste Antoinette Guy; 11 August 1876; Paris, France
- Died: 16 November 1957 (aged 81); Paris, France
- Occupation: Actress
- Years active: 1911–1950s

Blanche Denège (1876–1957; née Jeanne Céleste Antoinette Guy), was a French stage and film actress. Denège was born in the 2nd arrondissement of Paris. Denège started her career in stage acting; and eventually worked in silent films, followed by talkies. She died on 16 November 1957 in the 14th arrondissement of Paris.

== Filmography ==
- A Conquest (1911), silent film directed by Henri Pouctal; as Henriette
- Sans Fortune (1922), directed by Geo Kessler; as Diane de Nangis
- Passport 13.444 (1931), directed by Léon Mathot
- Orange Blossom (1932), directed by Henry Roussel; as Mme de Méricourt
- The Dreamy Mouth (1932), directed by Paul Czinner
- L’Aimable Lingère (1932), directed by Émile-Bernard Donatien
- Broken Wings (1933), directed by André Berthomieu; as Blanche Grasset
- Iris Perdue et Retrouvée (1933), directed by Louis J. Gasnier; as Mme de Persani
- Mademoiselle Josette, My Woman (1933), directed by André Berthomieu; as Mme Dupré
- The Premature Father (1933), directed by René Guissart; as Mme Puma
- Stradivarius (1935), directed by Géza von Bolváry and Albert Valentin
- The Flame (1936), directed by André Berthomieu
- La Porte du large (1936), directed by Marcel L'Herbier
- Chaste Susanne (1937), directed by André Berthomieu; as Mme des Aubraies
- Nights of Fire (1937), directed by Marcel L'Herbier; as Une invitée aux fiançailles
- Ramuntcho (1938), directed by René Barberis; as the good mother
- The End of the Day (1939), directed by Julien Duvivier; as Mme Laroche
- The Man from Niger (1940), directed by Jacques de Baroncelli; as Sœur Théoneste
- Tempête (1940), directed by Bernard Deschamps; as the tobacconist
- Facing Destiny (1940), directed by Henri Fescourt
- The Firemen's Ball (1948), directed by André Berthomieu; as Cécile Grégeois
- The Heart on the Sleeve (1949), directed by André Berthomieu; as Augustine, the priest's maid
- Tire au flanc (1950), directed by Fernand Rivers
- Chacun son tour (1951), directed by André Berthomieu; as aunt Clémence
- Never Two Without Three (1951), directed by André Berthomieu; as the godmother
- Une histoire d'amour (1951), directed by Guy Lefranc; as a guest
- Three Women (1952), directed by André Michel
- La Vérité sur Bébé Donge (1952), directed by Henri Decoin; as a guest
- The Seven Deadly Sins (1952), in the pride sketch directed by Claude Autant-Lara
- Leathernose (1952), directed by Yves Allégret; as a guest
- Matrimonial Agency (1952), directed by Jean-Paul Le Chanois
- Children of Love (1953), directed by Léonide Moguy
