= The Nude Woman (1949 film) =

1949 film

- Directed by: André Berthomieu
- Written by: Charles Exbrayat; Solange Térac
- Based on: The Nude Woman by Henry Bataille
- Produced by: François Carron
- Starring: Yves Vincent; Gisèle Pascal; Jean Tissier
- Cinematography: Michel Kelber
- Edited by: Henri Taverna
- Music by: Henri Verdun
- Production companies: Productions Sigma; Sociedade Pernambucana de Indústrias Artísticas
- Distributed by: Les Films Vog
- Release date: 2 September 1949
- Running time: 90 minutes
- Country: France
- Language: French

The Nude Woman (French: La femme nue) is a 1949 French drama film directed by André Berthomieu and starring Yves Vincent, Gisèle Pascal and Jean Tissier. It is based on the 1909 play of the same title by Henry Bataille. The film's sets were designed by the art director Raymond Nègre.

== Synopsis ==
The artist Pierre Bernier has earned fame for his painting The Nude Woman, the model for which, Loulou, he has subsequently married. Now, however, Pierre is in love with a high society lady. In her desperation to keep him, Loulou attempts suicide.

== Cast ==
- Yves Vincent as Pierre Bernier
- Gisèle Pascal as Loulou
- Jean Tissier as Roussel
- Paulette Dubost as Suzon
- Jean Davy as Ronchard
- Michèle Philippe as La princesse de Chabran / The Princess
- Pierre Magnier as Le prince de Chabran / The Prince
- Arthur Allan as Jacopoulos
- Annie Avril as La bonne
- Germaine Charley as Mme Garzin
- Eddy Debray as Le chirurgien
- Maurice Dorléac as Le médecin
- Paul Faivre as Le père Louis
- Suzanne Guémard as L'infirmière
- Harry-Max as Le critique
- Marcel Loche as Le portier
- Michel Nastorg as Le peintre
- Robert Rollis as Le menuisier
- Jean Toulout as Garzin
- Georges Vitray as Gréville

== Bibliography ==
- Goble, Alan. The Complete Index to Literary Sources in Film. Walter de Gruyter, 1999..
- Rège, Philippe. Encyclopedia of French Film Directors, Volume 1. Scarecrow Press, 2009.
