= Charles Bouillaud =

French actor (1904–1965)

Charles Bouillaud (11 May 1904 – 12 June 1965) was a French actor.

== Selected filmography ==
- Hôtel du Nord (1938) - Un inspecteur (uncredited)
- The Emigrant (1940) - (uncredited)
- My First Love (1945) - Le pion
- Peloton d'exécution (1945)
- Gringalet (1946) - Bit part (uncredited)
- Not So Stupid (1946) - Joseph
- Carré de valets (1947) - Le procureur
- Par la fenêtre (1948) - Joseph - le concierge (uncredited)
- White as Snow (1948) - L'inspecteur Robillard
- The Shadow (1948) - Sylvain
- Impeccable Henri (1948)
- The Heart on the Sleeve (1948) - Paulo - le guitariste
- The Firemen's Ball (1948) - Coquillard
- Doctor Laennec (1949) - Un domestique
- The Widow and the Innocent (1949) - L'inspecteur Bontemps
- The Heroic Monsieur Boniface (1949) - Le troisième gangster
- La Petite Chocolatière (1949) - Le maître d'hôtel
- On ne triche pas avec la vie (1949) - Thomas
- Nous irons à Paris (1950) - Un membre de la maréchaussée
- King Pandora (1950) - Grenu
- Mademoiselle Josette, My Woman (1950) - Le portier
- God Needs Men (1950) - Le gendarme
- Pigalle-Saint-Germain-des-Prés (1950) - Un inspecteur
- The King of Camelots (1951) - Emile
- Deux sous de violettes (1951) - Un agent de police (uncredited)
- Chacun son tour (1951) - Pitois
- Never Two Without Three (1951) - Joseph dit Jojo
- My Wife Is Formidable (1951) - Le chef de réception à l'hôtel
- Massacre in Lace (1952) - Un employé de la rédaction
- The Crime of Bouif (1952) - L'agent Balloche
- An Artist with Ladies (1952) - L'Inspecteur
- Allô... je t'aime (1952) - Martinet
- We Are All Murderers (1952) - L'agent (uncredited)
- Foyer perdu (1952) - Thomas - le clerc
- Monsieur Taxi (1952) - L'agent de la circulation
- Crimson Curtain (1952) - Le policier au commissariat (uncredited)
- My Husband Is Marvelous (1952)
- Tambour battant (1953) - Arthur
- The Last Robin Hood (1953) - Julien
- The Drunkard (1953) - Le substitut Barillier
- The Fighting Drummer (1953) - L'assureur
- L'Oeil en coulisses (1953) - Le voisin à la fenêtre
- The Three Musketeers (1953) - L'aubergiste de 'l'auberge des bourgeois de Calais'
- Virgile (1953) - L'agent (uncredited)
- His Father's Portrait (1953) - Martin
- Piédalu député (1954)
- Crainquebille (1954) - L'abbé
- Rasputin (1954) - L'industriel Posinoff
- Le Feu dans la peau (1954) - Eugène
- The Contessa's Secret (1954) - Masson - un indicateur
- Cadet Rousselle (1954) - Un colonel
- Death on the Run (1954) - Le policier #1
- Interdit de séjour (1955) - Un gardien (uncredited)
- Casse-cou, mademoiselle! (1955)
- The Duratons (1955) - Maître Robinot
- Men in White (1955) - Le guérisseur
- Black Dossier (1955) - Le valet de Broussard
- Je suis un sentimental (1955) - Un gendarme (uncredited)
- Chiens perdus sans collier (1955) - Un agent de police (uncredited)
- Gas-Oil (1955) - Le gendarme dactylographe
- Quatre jours à Paris (1955) - Le portier
- Lady Chatterley's Lover (1955) - Un habitué du pub
- Milord l'Arsouille (1955)
- People of No Importance (1956) - Le voisin de Viard
- La Bande à papa (1956) - Le capitaine des pompiers (uncredited)
- Marie Antoinette Queen of France (1956) - Un garde (uncredited)
- The Whole Town Accuses (1956) - Pistard
- La joyeuse prison (1956) - Blafard - un détenu faussaire (uncredited)
- Coup dur chez les mous (1956) - Le docteur
- Le Sang à la tête (1956) - Le chef de gare (uncredited)
- Plucking the Daisy (1956) - Le bistrot (uncredited)
- Ah, quelle équipe! (1957)
- The Happy Road (1957) - Driver of truck in the ditch (uncredited)
- Until the Last One (1957) - Un gendarme
- The Adventures of Arsène Lupin (1957) - Otto - le valet de chambre
- Le rouge est mis (1957) - Un inspecteur (uncredited)
- Cinq millions comptant (1957) - Anatole - le concierge de 'Télé-Mondial'
- Sénéchal le magnifique (1957) - Un accessoiriste (uncredited)
- Love in the Afternoon (1957) - Ritz Employee (uncredited)
- La roue (1957)
- Vacances explosives! (1957) - Un homme à l'hôtel (as Bouillaud)
- Les Espions (1957) - Un agent (uncredited)
- Porte des Lilas (1957) - L'agent (uncredited)
- Le Désir mène les hommes (1957)
- Mademoiselle Strip-tease (1957)
- Not Delivered (1958) - L'inspecteur Remaillard
- Maigret Sets a Trap (1958) - L'inspecteur suppléant Monclare
- Cargaison blanche (1958)
- Paris Holiday (1958) - Porter (uncredited)
- Police judiciaire (1958) - Monsieur Joly, le mari de l'Hôtelière assassinée
- Incognito (1958) - Un agent
- Be Beautiful But Shut Up (1958) - L'agent du commissariat (uncredited)
- Le Miroir a deux faces (1958) - Un professeur
- Sunday Encounter (1958) - Le réceptionniste (uncredited)
- The Lord's Vineyard (1958) - Jean - le domestique des Bourjeon
- Asphalte (1959) - Le barman (uncredited)
- Bobosse (1959) - Le régisseur
- Archimède le clochard (1959) - Le greffier de la prison (uncredited)
- Witness in the City (1959) - Un chauffeur de taxi ami de Raymond
- Oh! Qué mambo (1959) - L'agent
- The Gendarme of Champignol (1959) - L'adjudant Fournier
- Babette Goes to War (1959) - Pierrot
- Maigret et l'Affaire Saint-Fiacre (1959) - Le garçon de café
- Way of Youth (1959) - Le consommateur enrhumé chez Tiercelin (uncredited)
- Le vendeur de journaux (uncredited)
- Marie of the Isles (1959) - Un excité
- Préméditation (1960) - Le gardien
- Le Baron de l'écluse (1960) - Émile
- Bouche cousue (1960) - Le portier
- Comment qu'elle est? (1960) - (uncredited)
- The Old Guard (1960) - Le fils Bleuzet
- Love and the Frenchwoman (1960) - Ginette"s boss (segment "Virginité, La")
- Croesus (1960) - Le premier gendarme
- The Truth (1960) - L'avocat d'Annie
- L'ours (1960)
- Les Tortillards (1960) - Le maire de la ville et auteur de la pièce
- The Fenouillard Family (1960)
- The President (1961) - Un gendarme en faction
- L'imprevisto (1961)
- La peau et les os (1961)
- The Long Absence (1961) - Favier
- Le cave se rebiffe (1961) - Un graveur
- Le Miracle des loups (1961) - Olivier Le Daim
- Par-dessus le mur (1961)
- Paris Blues (1961) - Luggage Carrier in Train (uncredited)
- Famous Love Affairs (1961) - (segment "Jenny de Lacour") (uncredited)
- L'assassin est dans l'annuaire (1962) - (uncredited)
- A Monkey in Winter (1962) - Le chauffeur de taxi
- Un chien dans un jeu de quilles (1962)
- Arsène Lupin Versus Arsène Lupin (1962) - Le conducteur de la locomotive (uncredited)
- The Mysteries of Paris (1962) - Godin
- C'est pas moi, c'est l'autre (1962) - Le gendarme Brichetot (uncredited)
- Comment réussir en amour (1962) - (uncredited)
- Five Miles to Midnight (1962)
- Le Doulos (1963) - Le barman du Cotton Club
- Two Are Guilty (1963) - Un inspecteur
- Any Number Can Win (1963) - Un voyageur (uncredited)
- The Day and the Hour (1963) - Un voyageur
- Maigret Sees Red (1963) - Le pharmacien Dullac
- Cherchez l'idole (1964) - Un contrôleur (uncredited)
- Dandelions by the Roots (1964) - Léon
- Coplan prend des risques (1964) - (uncredited)
- Requiem pour un caïd (1964)
- The Adventures of Salavin (1964) - Le patron
- Week-end à Zuydcoote (1964) - Le rouspéteur
- Les gros bras (1964) - Le concierge de l'hôtel 'Prince de Galles' (uncredited)
- Up from the Beach (1965) - French horn player
- Les Mordus de Paris (1965) - (final film role)
