= The Angel of the Night =

1944 film

- Directed by: André Berthomieu
- Written by: Marcel Lasseaux (play); André Obey
- Produced by: Raymond Borderie; Adrien Remaugé
- Starring: Jean-Louis Barrault; Michèle Alfa; Henri Vidal
- Cinematography: Jean Bachelet
- Edited by: Jeannette Berton
- Music by: Roger-Roger; Maurice Thiriet
- Production company: Pathé Consortium Cinéma
- Distributed by: Pathé Consortium Cinéma
- Release date: 19 January 1944
- Running time: 95 minutes
- Country: France
- Language: French

The Angel of the Night (French: L'ange de la nuit) is a 1944 French drama film directed by André Berthomieu and starring Jean-Louis Barrault, Michèle Alfa and Henri Vidal. The film's sets were designed by the art directors Lucien Aguettand and Raymond Nègre.

== Main cast ==
- Jean-Louis Barrault as Jacques Martin
- Michèle Alfa as Geneviève
- Henri Vidal as Bob
- Gaby André as Simone
- Yves Furet as Hugues
- Claire Jordan as Claudie
- Lydie Vallois as Jeanine
- Cynette Quero as Hélène
- René Fluet as Pierre
- Manuel Gary as Roland
- Albert Morys as François
- Alice Tissot as Mme Robinot
- Simone Signoret as Une étudiante
- Pierre Larquey as Heurteloup

== Bibliography ==
- Dayna Oscherwitz & MaryEllen Higgins. The A to Z of French Cinema. Scarecrow Press, 2009.
