= Robert Rollis =

French actor

Robert Rollis (16 March 1921 – 6 November 2007) was a French actor. He mainly starred as a film actor, but also appeared in television and also in theatre in the 1950s and early 1960s. Amongst many roles, he starred in Yves Robert's War of the Buttons (La Guerre des boutons) in 1962.

== Selected filmography ==
- Crossroads (1938)
- The Novel of Werther (1938)
- Sins of Youth (1941)
- Annette and the Blonde Woman (1942)
- Dawn Devils (1946)
- Loves, Delights and Organs (1947)
- The Firemen's Ball (1948)
- The Nude Woman (1949)
- The King of Camelots (1951)
- Never Two Without Three (1951)
- The Long Teeth (1952)
- Adorables créatures (1952)
- The House on the Dune (1952)
- Wonderful Mentality (1953)
- Faites-moi confiance (1954)
- Death on the Run (1954)
- Papa, maman, la bonne et moi (1954)
- Papa, maman, ma femme et moi (1955)
- Madelon (1955)
- Three Days to Live (1957)
- Love Is at Stake (1957)
- The Gendarme of Champignol (1959)
- The Indestructible (1959)
- Les Tortillards (1960)
- The Fenouillard Family (1960)
- Ravishing (1960)
- All the Gold in the World (1961)
- L'honorable Stanislas, agent secret (1962)
- Les Veinards (1963)
- The Counterfeit Constable (1964)
- What's New Pussycat? (1965)
- The Little Bather (1968)
- A Slightly Pregnant Man (1973)
- Toutes griffes dehors (1982)
- Le Braconnier de Dieu (1983)
