= Paul Faivre =

French actor

- Born: 3 March 1886; Belfort, France
- Died: 5 March 1973 (aged 87); Paris, France
- Occupation: Actor
- Years active: 1930-1967

Paul Faivre (3 March 1886 – 5 March 1973) was a French actor.

== Selected filmography ==
- The House Opposite (1937)
- The Lady from Vittel (1937)
- Cinderella (1937)
- Behind the Facade (1939)
- Vidocq (1939)
- Moulin Rouge (1941)
- Annette and the Blonde Woman (1942)
- The Woman I Loved Most (1942)
- Romance for Three (1942)
- The Count of Monte Cristo (1943)
- Domino (1943)
- Florence Is Crazy (1944)
- Sowing the Wind (1944)
- Boule de suif (1945)
- My First Love (1945)
- The Black Cavalier (1945)
- Jericho (1946)
- Not So Stupid (1946)
- The Captain (1946)
- Monsieur Grégoire Escapes (1946)
- Gringalet (1946)
- The Misfortunes of Sophie (1946)
- Cyrano de Bergerac (1946)
- Fantômas (1946)
- Love Around the House (1947)
- Four Knaves (1947)
- Mirror (1947)
- Loves, Delights and Organs (1947)
- Rendezvous in Paris (1947)
- The Last Vacation (1948)
- The Firemen's Ball (1948)
- White as Snow (1948)
- The Shadow (1948)
- Under the Cards (1948)
- The Heart on the Sleeve (1948)
- The Widow and the Innocent (1949)
- Monseigneur (1949)
- The Nude Woman (1949)
- The Sinners (1949)
- Thirst of Men (1950)
- King Pandora (1950)
- The New Masters (1950)
- Quay of Grenelle (1950)
- Mademoiselle Josette, My Woman (1950)
- The Beautiful Image (1951)
- The Lovers of Bras-Mort (1951)
- The King of Camelots (1951)
- My Husband Is Marvelous (1952)
- The House on the Dune (1952)
- It Happened in Paris (1952)
- She and Me (1952)
- Monsieur Leguignon, Signalman (1952)
- Imperial Violets (1952)
- Run Away Mr. Perle (1952)
- The Happiest of Men (1952)
- The House on the Dune (1952)
- Capitaine Pantoufle (1953)
- The Last Robin Hood (1953)
- Wonderful Mentality (1953)
- Poisson d'avril (1954)
- Leguignon the Healer (1954)
- Stain in the Snow (1954)
- Thirteen at the Table (1955)
- The Duratons (1955)
- Blackmail (1955)
- Eighteen Hour Stopover (1955)
- Blood to the Head (1956)
- The She-Wolves (1957)
- The Seventh Commandment (1957)
- The Singer from Mexico (1957)
- The Gentleman from Epsom (1962)
- Monsieur (1964)
