= Jacques Louvigny =

French actor

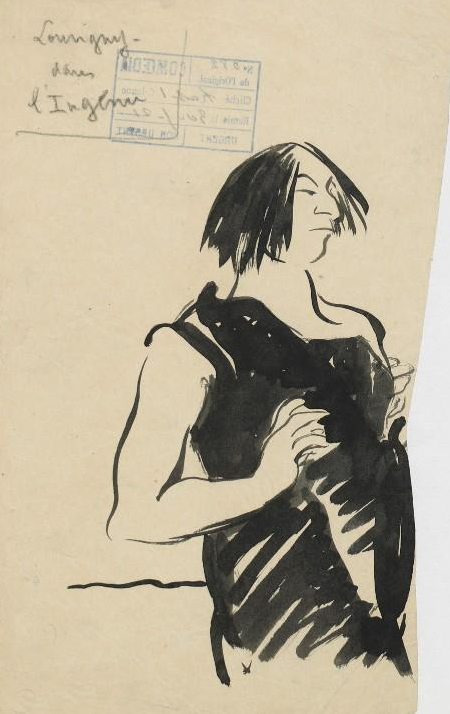
- A 1921 caricature of Louvigny
- Born: 15 February 1884; Bordeaux, France
- Died: 9 February 1951 (aged 66); Paris, France
- Occupation: Actor
- Years active: 1914-1950 (film)

Jacques Louvigny (1884–1951) was a French stage and film actor.

== Selected filmography ==
- Delphine (1931)
- On purge bébé (1931)
- Fanfare of Love (1935)
- The Squadron's Baby (1935)
- The Lover of Madame Vidal (1936)
- Hôtel du Nord (1938)
- Mollenard (1938)
- Thunder Over Paris (1940)
- At Your Command, Madame (1942)
- Colonel Pontcarral (1942)
- Fever (1942)
- Frederica (1942)
- I Am with You (1943)
- Madly in Love (1943)
- The Island of Love (1944)
- Death No Longer Awaits (1944)
- Florence Is Crazy (1944)
- My First Love (1945)
- Not So Stupid (1946)
- Gringalet (1946)
- Pastoral Symphony (1946)
- Song of the Clouds (1946)
- Four Knaves (1947)
- Loves, Delights and Organs (1947)
- The Heart on the Sleeve (1948)
- White as Snow (1948)
- Colomba (1948)
- The Shadow (1948)
- To the Eyes of Memory (1948)
- All Roads Lead to Rome (1949)

== Bibliography ==
- Hayward, Susan. Simone Signoret: The Star as Cultural Sign. Continuum, 2004.
