= The Widow and the Innocent =

1949 film

- Directed by: André Cerf
- Written by: André Cerf
- Produced by: Pierre Gérin
- Starring: Sophie Desmarets; Jean Desailly; Saturnin Fabre
- Cinematography: André Thomas
- Edited by: Andrée Sélignac
- Music by: Francis Lopez
- Production company: Les Productions Cinématographiques
- Distributed by: Ciné Sélection
- Release date: 24 August 1949
- Running time: 95 minutes
- Country: France
- Language: French

The Widow and the Innocent (French: La veuve et l'innocent) is a 1949 French comedy film directed by André Cerf and starring Sophie Desmarets, Jean Desailly and Saturnin Fabre. The film's sets were designed by the art director Robert-Jules Garnier.

== Synopsis ==
Nicole, a young lawyer, is given her first case in court. However her defence of Achille Panoyau, accused of murder, is unsuccessful and he is sentenced to be executed. She then tells her fiancée Claude that she will not marry him unless he can save Panoyau from "the widow" - a nickname for the guillotine. Claude does this by stealing the guillotine and taking it with them on their honeymoon. Whilst evading the police on their tail they manage to discover the real murderer and Panoyau is set free.

== Cast ==
- Sophie Desmarets as Nicole - l'avocate
- Jean Desailly as Claude Girelle
- Saturnin Fabre as Achille Panoyau - l'accusé
- Jean Tissier as Lepautre
- Raymond Bussières as Paulo
- Albert Duvaleix as Tiercelet
- Yvette Andréyor as Madame Tiercelet
- Christian Argentin as Le ministre
- Charles Bouillaud as L'inspecteur Bontemps
- Christiane Dauran as L'employée
- Eddy Debray as Le médecin
- Paul Faivre as Le procureur
- Jean Barrère as Le gérant de l'hôtel
- Georges Paulais as Le receleur
- Marcel Pérès as Lahotte
- Marcel Raine as L'avocat général
- Jacques Tarride as Charles
- André Versini as Gégène

== Bibliography ==
- Hubert-Lacombe, Patricia. Le cinéma français dans la guerre froide: 1946-1956. L'Harmattan, 1996.
- Rège, Philippe. Encyclopedia of French Film Directors, Volume 1. Scarecrow Press, 2009.
