= Paul-Louis Boutié =

French art director

- Born: 15 July 1910; Leuville-sur-Orge, France
- Died: 10 April 2004 (aged 93); Paris, France
- Occupation: Art director
- Years active: 1938–1967 (film)

Paul-Louis Boutié (1910-2004) was a French art director who designed the sets for many film productions in postwar France cinema.

== Selected filmography ==
- Beautiful Star (1938)
- The Acrobat (1941)
- Gringalet (1946)
- Lessons in Conduct (1946)
- The Sea Rose (1946)
- Six Hours to Lose (1947)
- After Love (1948)
- The White Night (1948)
- The King (1949)
- Marlene (1949)
- Two Loves (1949)
- Murders (1950)
- Rendezvous in Grenada (1951)
- A Girl on the Road (1952)
- Monsieur Leguignon, Signalman (1952)
- My Brother from Senegal (1953)
- The Last Robin Hood (1953)
- The Sleepwalker (1951)
- The Ostrich Has Two Eggs (1957)
- Fugitive in Saigon (1957)
- The Inspector Likes a Fight (1957)
- The Seventh Commandment (1957)
- Thérèse Étienne (1958)
- Eyes of Love (1959)
- The Fenouillard Family (1961)
- Taxi for Tobruk (1961)
- Le Masque de fer (1962)
- OSS 117 Mission for a Killer (1965)
- Diamonds Are Brittle (1965)
- The Majordomo (1965)
- The Gardener of Argenteuil (1966)

== Bibliography ==
- Coates-Smith, Michael & McGee, Garry. The Films of Jean Seberg. McFarland, 2014.
