= Wonderful Mentality =

1953 film

- Directed by: André Berthomieu
- Written by: André Berthomieu; Roger Pierre
- Produced by: André Berthomieu
- Starring: Jean Richard; Michèle Philippe; Jean Martinelli
- Cinematography: Georges Million
- Edited by: Louisette Hautecoeur
- Music by: Georges Van Parys
- Production company: Bertho Films
- Distributed by: Columbia Films
- Release date: 15 March 1953
- Running time: 90 minutes
- Country: France
- Language: French

Wonderful Mentality (French: Belle mentalité) is a 1953 French comedy film directed by André Berthomieu and starring Jean Richard, Michèle Philippe and Jean Martinelli. The film's sets were designed by the art director Raymond Nègre.

== Synopsis ==
Honoré, a valet, has an extremely logical mind and is unable to tell a lie. This comes in very fortunate for the family he works for.

== Cast ==
- Jean Richard as Honoré Bonvalet
- Michèle Philippe as Solange de Fleury
- Jean Martinelli as Jacques de Fleury
- Jeanne Fusier-Gir as Madame de Fleury
- Roger Pierre as Frédo
- Jean-Marc Thibault as Le journaliste
- Elisa Lamotte as Loulou Régina
- Paul Faivre as Le père Bonvalet
- Claire Gérard as La mère d'Honoré
- Geneviève Kervine as Marinette
- Dorette Ardenne as La secrétaire
- Huguette Vergne as La femme de chambre
- Harry-Max as Le commissaire
- Maurice Biraud
- Nono Zammit
- Max Desrau
- Jack Ary as Un gendarme
- Max Martel
- Geneviève Morel as La cuisinière
- Robert Rollis as Un photographe de presse

== Bibliography ==
- Rège, Philippe. Encyclopedia of French Film Directors, Volume 1. Scarecrow Press, 2009.
