= Deputy Eusèbe =

1939 film

- Directed by: André Berthomieu
- Written by: Tristan Bernard; Ákos Tolnay; Jacques de Féraudy
- Produced by: Michael Salkind
- Starring: Michel Simon; Elvire Popesco; Jules Berry
- Cinematography: Fred Langenfeld
- Edited by: Henri Taverna
- Music by: Michel Michelet
- Production companies: Compagnie Métropolitaine de Films; Productions Salkind
- Distributed by: Forrester-Parant
- Release date: 24 February 1939
- Running time: 85 minutes
- Country: France
- Language: French

Deputy Eusèbe (French: Eusèbe député) is a 1939 French comedy film directed by André Berthomieu and starring Michel Simon, Elvire Popesco and Jules Berry. The film's sets were designed by the art director Robert Gys.

== Synopsis ==
Eusèbe Bonbonneau, a solicitor's clerk, discovers that a candidate is running for Chamber of Deputies. It becomes clear that a corrupt businessman is pushing a candidate, having usurped his identity, in order to secure backing for a new casino project. The real Eusèbe goes to Paris to investigate and is persuaded by the flamboyant actress Mariska to really stand in the election. He wins and is elected as a deputy where he becomes an unwitting tool of corrupt interests.

== Cast ==
- Michel Simon as Eusèbe Bonbonneau
- Elvire Popesco as Mariska
- Jules Berry as Félix Jacassar
- Marguerite Moreno as Émilie Bonbonneau
- André Lefaur as Le comte de Marignan
- Gaston Dubosc as Le notaire
- Marcelle Rexiane as La secrétaire
- René Bergeron as Pinson
- Albert Broquin as Le régisseur
- Hugues de Bagratide as Un invité
- Henri de Livry as Le patron du restaurant
- Paul Demange as Le concierge
- Georges Douking as Firmin
- Louis Florencie as Le ministre
- Édouard Francomme as Un électeur
- Jean Heuzé as Le commissaire
- Jean Hébey as Le maître d'hôtel
- Gaston Mauger as Gaburon
- Marthe Mussine as Yvonne Solange
- Jane Pierson as L'habilleuse
- Robert Seller as L'acteur

== Bibliography ==
- Bessy, Maurice & Chirat, Raymond. Histoire du cinéma français: encyclopédie des films, Volume 2. Pygmalion, 1986.
- Crisp, Colin. Genre, Myth and Convention in the French Cinema, 1929-1939. Indiana University Press, 2002.
- Rège, Philippe. Encyclopedia of French Film Directors, Volume 1. Scarecrow Press, 2009.
