= Four Knaves =

1947 film

- Directed by: André Berthomieu
- Written by: André Berthomieu; Georges Dolley; Jean Gehret; Henri Jeanson
- Produced by: Adrien Remaugé
- Starring: Jean Desailly; Martine Carol; Denise Grey
- Cinematography: Fred Langenfeld
- Edited by: Jeannette Berton
- Music by: Georges Van Parys
- Production company: Société Nouvelle Pathé Cinéma
- Distributed by: Pathé Consortium Cinéma
- Release date: 8 October 1947
- Running time: 90 minutes
- Country: France
- Language: French

Four Knaves (French: Carré de valets) is a 1947 French comedy film directed by André Berthomieu and starring Jean Desailly, Martine Carol and Denise Grey. It was shot at the Francoeur Studios in Paris. The film's sets were designed by the art director Raymond Nègre.

== Synopsis ==
Jacques de la Bastide is a struggling lawyer who is dominated by his overbearing mother. For once he manages to win a case, getting three petty criminals off. To his surprise he finds out from Catherine, the attractive daughter of one of the men, that they are disappointed as they had been hoping to have board and lodging in prison over the winter. He agrees to take them on as servants in his own household.

== Cast ==
- Jean Desailly as Jacques de la Bastide
- Martine Carol as Catherine Bonpain
- Denise Grey as Madame de la Bastide
- Pierre Larquey as Arthur Bonpain - un cambrioleur
- Liliane Bert as Betty
- Paul Faivre as Le président Piquet
- Robert Berri as Philibert - un escroc
- Henri Charrett as Un invité
- Roger Saget as Biscotin
- Christiane Muller as Madame Biscotin
- Eliane Charles as Solange
- Jacques Louvigny as Firmin - le valet
- Alexandre Mathillon as Dubois
- Yves Deniaud as Jules Furet - un cambrioleur
- Harry-Max as Monsieur Dubois - l'entomologiste
- Louis Florencie as Monsieur Georges
- Bernard Lajarrige as Albert Furet - un cambrioleur

== Bibliography ==
- Bessy, Maurice & Chirat, Raymond. Histoire du cinéma français: encyclopédie des films, 1940–1950. Pygmalion, 1986
- Rège, Philippe. Encyclopedia of French Film Directors, Volume 1. Scarecrow Press, 2009.
