= Georges Million =

French cinematographer (1898–1958)

- Born: September 24, 1898; Paris
- Died: January 16, 1958 (aged 59); Paris
- Occupation: Cinematographer
- Years active: 1921–1958 (film)

Georges Million (24 September 1898 – 16 January 1958) was a French cinematographer. He worked on more than fifty films between 1921 and 1958.

== Selected filmography ==
- Verdun: Visions of History (1928)
- The Mad Night (1932)
- Thirteen Days of Love (1935)
- The Call of Silence (1936)
- The Men Without Names (1937)
- Boulot the Aviator (1937)
- Sisters in Arms (1937)
- The Guardian Angel (1942)
- Eight Men in a Castle (1942)
- Malaria (1943)
- Shot in the Night (1943)
- The Man Without a Name (1943)
- Special Mission (1946)
- A Cop (1947)
- Impeccable Henri (1948)
- Judicial Error (1948)
- The Man Who Returns from Afar (1950)
- The Ferret (1950)
- Death Threat (1950)
- Casabianca (1951)
- His Father's Portrait (1953)
- Wonderful Mentality (1953)
- The Last Robin Hood (1953)

== Bibliography ==
- Powrie, Phil & Rebillard, Éric. Pierre Batcheff and stardom in 1920s French cinema. Edinburgh University Press, 2009.
