= Paulette Dubost =

French actress (1910–2011)

- Born: Paulette Emma Marie Deplanque; 8 October 1910; Paris, France
- Died: 21 September 2011 (aged 100); Longjumeau, France
- Occupation: Actress
- Years active: 1917–2007
- Spouse: Andre Ostertag (1936–44; divorced)

Paulette Dubost (8 October 1910 – 21 September 2011) was a French actress who began her career at the age of 7 at the Paris Opera.

She appeared in over 250 films and worked with directors such as Marcel Carné, Jean Renoir, Max Ophüls (Le Plaisir 1952 and Lola Montès, 1955) and François Truffaut. Her best-known role is as Lisette in Renoir's The Rules of the Game (La règle du jeu, 1939). Originally intended to be a small role offering only a couple of days' work, the extent of her part grew during the four-month shooting schedule.

She died at age 100.

== Selected filmography ==
- J'ai quelque chose à vous dire (1931, Short)
- Le Bal (1931) - Mademoiselle Yvette, La cliente
- A Dog That Pays Off (1932) - Une locataire
- Amourous Adventure (1932)
- A Telephone Call (1932) - Clara
- Night Shift (1932) - La petite femme
- You Will Be My Wife (1932) - Annette
- The Regiment's Champion (1932)
- Un homme sans nom (1932)
- I by Day, You by Night (1932) - La collègue de Juliette
- Riri et Nono amoureux (1932)
- L'homme qui ne sait pas dire non (1932)
- En plein dans le mille (1932) - Paulette
- L'enfant de ma soeur (1933) - Radada
- Youth (1933) - Gisèle
- Paris-Soleil (1933)
- Rivaux de la piste (1933) - L'amie de Hanni Spengler
- Le Martyre de l'obèse (1933) - Babette
- Les vingt-huit jours de Clairette (1933) - Nichotte
- On the Streets (1933) - Pauline
- The Orderly (1933) - Marie
- To Be Loved (1933) - Maryse
- Cette nuit-là (1933) - Alice
- Maison hantée (1933)
- The Fakir of the Grand Hotel (1934) - Estelle
- George and Georgette (1934) - Lilian
- Vive la compagnie (1934) - Françoise Martin
- Une fois dans la vie (1934) - Josette
- La cinquième empreinte (1934) - Lucie Cavelier
- Happiness (1934, directed by Marcel L'Herbier) - Louise
- Le Roi des Champs-Élysées (1934) - Germaine
- L'auberge du Petit-Dragon (1934) - Marie
- Le billet de mille (1935)
- Studio à louer (1935) - Estelle
- Count Obligado (1935) - Mitaine
- Ferdinand the Roisterer (1935) - Paulette Fourageot
- La caserne en folie (1935) - Louisette
- La rosière des Halles (1935) - Célestine
- The Squadron's Baby (1935) - Anaïs
- La petite sauvage (1935) - Paulette
- Prince of the Six Days (1936) - Mona, la danseuse
- La brigade en jupons (1936) - Paulette
- La reine des resquilleuses (1937)
- The Lie of Nina Petrovna (1937) - Lotte / Lottle
- Titin des Martigues (1938) - Yvette
- Barnabé (1938) - Rose
- L'ange que j'ai vendu (1938) - Esther Baronski
- Hôtel du Nord (1938, directed by Marcel Carné) - Ginette
- Le paradis des voleurs (1939) - Paulette
- La Règle du jeu (1939, directed by Jean Renoir) - Lisette, sa camériste
- Bécassine (1940) - Bécassine
- Opéra-musette (1942) - Jeanne
- I Am with You (1943) - La standardiste
- Adrien (1943) - Arlette Luciole
- Farandole (1945) - La grue
- Roger la Honte (1946) - Victoire
- Happy Go Lucky (1946) - Brigitte Ancelin
- The Revenge of Roger (1946) - Victoire
- Six heures à perdre (1947) - Annette
- La Dernière Chevauchée (1947) - Milouda
- Plume la poule (1947)
- Ploum, ploum, tra-la-la (1947) - Germaine
- Et dix de der (1948) - Titine
- White as Snow (1948) - Charlotte Béloiseau
- The Tragic Dolmen (1948) - La vicomtesse de Kerlec
- The Firemen's Ball (1948) - Germaine
- My Aunt from Honfleur (1949) - Lucette
- The Nude Woman (1949) - Suzon
- The Chocolate Girl (1949) - Julie
- Le 84 prend des vacances (1950) - Paulette Bernod
- King Pandora (1950) - Angèle
- Uniformes et grandes manoeuvres (1950) - Alice
- Tire au flanc (1950) - Georgette
- Four in a Jeep (1951) - Germaine Pasture
- The Darling of His Concierge (1951) - Mme Motte, la concierge
- Come Down, Someone Wants You (1951) - Irène
- Le Plaisir (House of Pleasure, 1952) - Madame Fernande (segment "La Maison Tellier")
- La fête à Henriette (Holiday for Henrietta 1952, directed by Julien Duvivier) Virginie - la mère d'Henriette
- L'oeil en coulisses (1953) - Mme. Florent
- My Brother from Senegal (1953) - Séraphine - la servante de M. Pinson
- The Sheep Has Five Legs (1954) - Solange Saint-Forget
- The French, They Are a Funny Race (1955, directed by Preston Sturges) - Madame Taupin
- Lola Montès (1955) - Josephine, The maid
- Ces sacrées vacances (1956) - Madame Fouleur - la femme du brigadier
- La joyeuse prison (1956) - Justine Benoit
- Der 10. Mai (1957) - Madame Dubois
- Maigret Sets a Trap (1958) - Mauricette Barberot
- Mädchen in Uniform (1958) - Johanna
- The Adventures of Remi (1958) - Maman Barberin
- Taxi, Roulotte et Corrida (1958) - Germaine Berger
- Soupe au lait (1959) - Mme. Berthaut
- An Angel on Wheels (1959) - La mère de Line
- Way of Youth (1959) - Hélène Michaud
- Picnic on the Grass (1959) - Forestier
- Le Bossu (1959) - Dame Marthe
- La main chaude (1960) - Lise Lacoste
- Tendre et violente Elisabeth (1960) - Mme Lauriston
- Love and the Frenchwoman (1960) - Mme. Tronche (segment "Enfance, L'")
- Arrêtez les tambours (1961) - Widow
- Love Play (1961) - Anne's Maid
- The Seven Deadly Sins (1962) - Madame Jasmin (segment "Envie, L'") (uncredited)
- The Mysteries of Paris (1962) - Mme Pipelet
- Pourquoi Paris? (1962) - La restauratrice
- Enough Rope (1963) - Helen Kimmel
- Seul... à corps perdu (1963) - La servante
- Germinal (1963) - Rose, la servante
- Maigret Sees Red (1963) - La patronne de l'hôtel
- Banana Peel (1963) - Germaine Bontemps / Mme Bordas
- L'assassin viendra ce soir (1964) - Hélène Serval
- La dérive (1964) - La mère de Jacquie
- La chance et l'amour (1964) - Amélie Bizet (segment "Fiancés de la chance, Les")
- That Tender Age (1964) - Françoise Malhouin
- Black Humor (1965) - (segment 1 'La Bestiole')
- Viva Maria! (1965) - Mme Diogène
- Un garçon, une fille. Le dix-septième ciel (1966)
- The Sunday of Life (1967) - Madame Bijou
- Juliette and Juliette (1974) - Mme. Rozenec
- Dear Inspector (1977) - Mother
- Take It from the Top (1978) - La mère de Jean-Pierre
- La barricade du Point du Jour (1978) - Mme Lapoule
- La Gueule de l'autre (1979) - Mme Chalebouis
- Jupiter's Thigh (1980) - La mère de Lise
- The Last Metro (1980, directed by François Truffaut) - Germaine Fabre
- La vie continue (1981) - Elizabeth
- Le retour des bidasses en folie (1983) - La mère supérieure
- Charlots connection (1984) - La blanchisseuse
- La femme ivoire (1984) - Mme Pujol
- Julien Fontanes, magistrat (1985, TV Series) - Mémée Plantini
- Cent francs l'amour (1986) - Gracieuse
- Le Tiroir secret (1986–1987, TV Series)
- La comédie du travail (1988) - La libraire
- May Fools (Milou en mai, 1990) - Mrs. Vieuzac
- Feu sur le candidat (1990) - Miss Martinot
- Le Jour des rois (1991) - Suzanne
- Les Mamies (1992) - Victoire
- H'Biba M'Sika (1994)
- Le roi de Paris (1995) - Raymonde
- Augustin, King of Kung-Fu (1999) - Madame Haton, the old neighbor
- Les Savates du bon Dieu (2000) - La grand-mère
- Les yeux clairs (2005) - Madame Le Sciellour
