= Three Boys, One Girl =

1948 film

- Directed by: Maurice Labro
- Written by: Claude Boissol; Robert-Paul Dagan; Roger Ferdinand (play); Maurice Labro
- Starring: Jean Marchat; Gaby Morlay; Suzy Carrier
- Cinematography: Enzo Riccioni
- Edited by: Robert Isnardon
- Music by: Maurice Thiriet
- Production company: F.A.O.
- Distributed by: Ciné Sélection
- Release date: 4 October 1948
- Running time: 90 minutes
- Country: France
- Language: French

Three Boys, One Girl (French: Trois garçons, une fille) is a 1948 French comedy drama film directed by Maurice Labro and starring Jean Marchat, Gaby Morlay and Suzy Carrier.

The film's sets were designed by the art directors Lucien Carré and Raymond Nègre.

== Cast ==
- Jean Marchat as Georges Dourville
- Gaby Morlay as Hélène Dourville
- Suzy Carrier as Christine Dourville
- Bernard La Jarrige as Michel Dourville
- François Patrice as Gilbert Dourville
- Maurice Favières as Bernard Dourville
- Luce Fabiole as Anna
- Gaby Bruyère as ami de Gilbert
- Marcel Loche as Huissier
- Nelly Wick as Dame
- Harry-Max
- Paul Clérouc
- Jacqueline Dor

== Bibliography ==
- Goble, Alan. The Complete Index to Literary Sources in Film. Walter de Gruyter, 1999.
