= Maigret voit rouge =

- Directed by: Gilles Grangier
- Written by: Gilles Grangier; Jacques Robert
- Based on: Maigret, Lognon and the Gangsters by Georges Simenon
- Produced by: Georges Charlot; Raymond Danon
- Starring: Jean Gabin; Françoise Fabian; Roland Armontel
- Cinematography: Louis Page
- Edited by: Marie-Sophie Dubus
- Music by: Michel Legrand; Francis Lemarque
- Production company: Les Films Copernic
- Distributed by: Les Films Copernic
- Release date: 18 September 1963
- Running time: 87 minutes
- Countries: France; Italy
- Language: French

Maigret voit rouge (English: Maigret Sees Red) is a 1963 French-Italian crime film directed by Gilles Grangier and starring Jean Gabin, Françoise Fabian and Roland Armontel. Based on the 1951 novel Maigret, Lognon and the Gangsters by Georges Simenon, it is Gabin's third appearance as Belgian writer Georges Simenon's fictional detective Jules Maigret.

It was shot at the Billancourt Studios in Paris and on location across the city. The film's sets were designed by the art director Jacques Colombier.

== Synopsis ==
A pedestrian is a victim of a drive-by shooting near the Gare du Nord. However, by the time the police arrive on the scene, the victim has disappeared, leaving behind only his glasses.

== Cast ==
- Jean Gabin as Jules Maigret
- Françoise Fabian as Lily
- Roland Armontel as Le docteur Fezin
- Paul Frankeur as Bonfils
- Paul Carpenter as Harry McDonald
- Edward Meeks as Bill Larner
- Ricky Cooper as Charlie
- Michel Constantin as Cicero
- Roger Dutoit as Bidoine
- Carlo Nell as Le garçon du 'Manhattan'
- Charles Bouillaud as Le pharmacien Dullac
- André Dalibert as Un inspecteur
- Harry-Max as Curtis
- Jean-Louis Le Goff as Un inspecteur
- Paulette Dubost as La patronne de l'hôtel
- Laurence Badie as Lucienne
- Jacques Dynam as Un inspecteur
- Marcel Bozzuffi as Torrence
- Guy Decomble as Lognon
- Vittorio Sanipoli as Pozzo
