= Suzy Carrier =

French film actress (1922–1999)

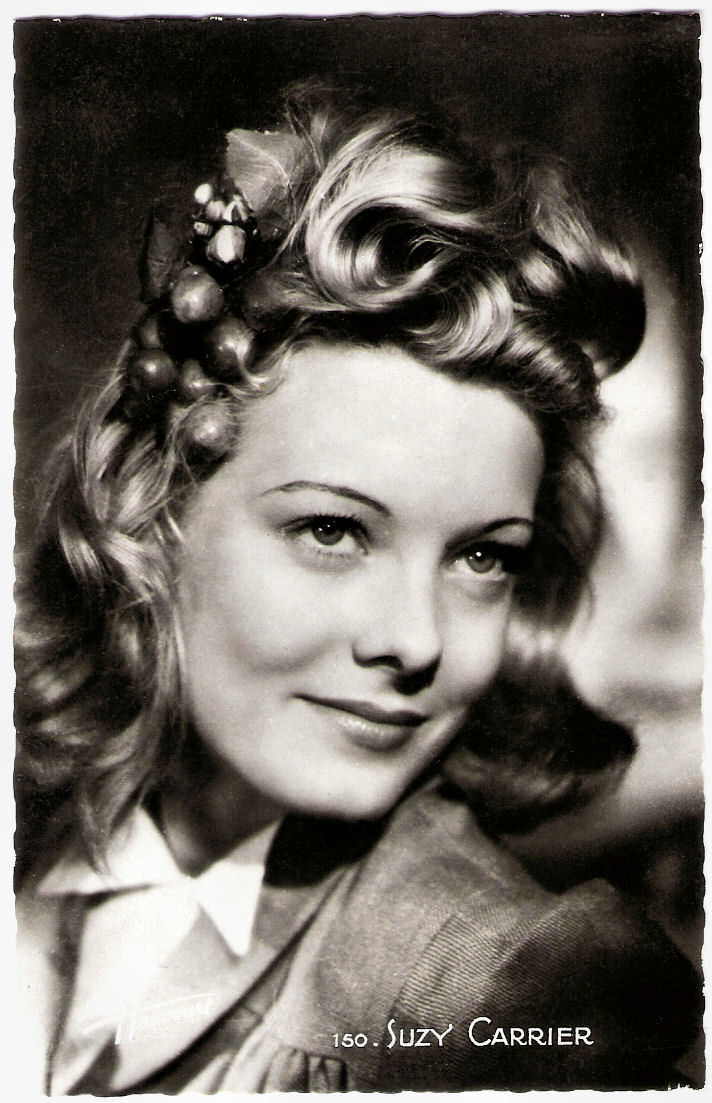
- Postcard of Suzy Carrier, SERP from Paris, 1940s
- Born: 13 November 1922; Moulins, Allier, France
- Died: 29 November 1999 (aged 77); Grasse, Alpes-Maritimes, France
- Occupation: Actress
- Years active: 1942-1974 (film)

Suzy Carrier (13 November 1922 – 29 November 1999) was a French film actress.

== Selected filmography ==
- Colonel Pontcarral (1942)
- The Stairs Without End (1943)
- Secrets (1943)
- Dorothy Looks for Love (1945)
- Distress (1946)
- Gringalet (1946)
- Not So Stupid (1946)
- A Cop (1947)
- Three Boys, One Girl (1948)
- Dakota 308 (1951)
- The Father of the Girl (1953)

== Bibliography ==
- Mitchell, Charles P. The Great Composers Portrayed on Film, 1913 through 2002. McFarland, 2004.
