= The Shadow (1948 film) =

1948 film

- Directed by: André Berthomieu
- Written by: André Berthomieu
- Based on: The Shadow by Francis Carco
- Produced by: Gilbert Cohen-Seat; André Halley des Fontaines
- Starring: Fernand Ledoux; Renée Faure; Berthe Bovy
- Cinematography: Maurice Barry
- Edited by: Pierre Méguérian
- Music by: Raymond Bailly
- Production company: Union Générale Cinématographique
- Distributed by: Alliance Générale de Distribution Cinématographique
- Release date: 23 June 1948
- Running time: 100 minutes
- Country: France
- Language: French

The Shadow (French: L'ombre) is a 1948 French crime drama film directed by André Berthomieu and starring Fernand Ledoux, Renée Faure and Berthe Bovy. It was based on a 1933 novel of the same title by Francis Carco. It was shot at the Saint-Maurice Studios in Paris. The film's sets were designed by the art director Raymond Nègre

== Cast ==
- Fernand Ledoux as Firmin Blache
- Renée Faure as Denise Fournier
- Berthe Bovy as Mme Fournier
- Pauline Carton as La concierge
- Pierre-Louis as L'inspecteur Roberge
- Gérard Nery as Jean Fournier
- Charles Bouillaud as Sylvain
- Albert Broquin as Le concierge
- Eliane Charles as Marthe Halluin
- Lolita De Silva as Mme Milot
- Paul Faivre as Veyrac
- Charles Lavialle as Albert
- Robert Le Fort as Un locataire
- Jeanne Lion as La teinturière
- Jacques Louvigny as Le commissaire principal
- Marcel Pérès as L'inspecteur Merlin
- Gabrielle Rosny as La vieille fille

== Bibliography ==
- Bessy, Maurice & Chirat, Raymond. Histoire du cinéma français: encyclopédie des films, 1940–1950. Pygmalion, 1986
- Goble, Alan. The Complete Index to Literary Sources in Film. Walter de Gruyter, 1999.
- Rège, Philippe. Encyclopedia of French Film Directors, Volume 1. Scarecrow Press, 2009.
