= The Seventh Commandment (1957 film) =

1957 film directed by Raymond Bernard

- Directed by: Raymond Bernard
- Written by: Jacques Companéez; Jean Marsan
- Produced by: François Harispuru
- Starring: Edwige Feuillère; Jacques Dumesnil; Jacques Morel
- Cinematography: André Germain
- Edited by: Raymond Leboursier
- Music by: René Sylviano
- Production companies: Compagnie Commerciale Française Cinématographique; Union des Distributeurs Indépendants
- Distributed by: Compagnie Commerciale Française Cinématographique
- Release date: 1 February 1957
- Running time: 96 minutes
- Country: France
- Language: French

The Seventh Commandment (French: Le septième commandement) is a 1957 French comedy film directed by Raymond Bernard and starring Edwige Feuillère, Jacques Dumesnil and Jacques Morel. The title is a reference to the seventh of the Ten Commandments in the Roman Catholic tradition, "Thou shalt not steal". It was shot at the Neuilly Studios in Paris. The film's sets were designed by the art director Paul-Louis Boutié.

== Synopsis ==
Princesse Nadia Vronskaïa is a veteran con artist, working with her two partners to targets likely suspects. However things go awry when she falls in love with her latest mark. With his help she turns the tables on her former associates.

== Cast ==
- Edwige Feuillère as Princesse Nadia Vronskaïa
- Jacques Dumesnil as Gilbert Odet
- Jacques Morel as Pilou
- Maurice Teynac as Labaroche
- Jeanne Fusier-Gir as Tante Amélie
- Micheline Dax as La brune remplaçante
- Jean Nergal as Van Roosebeck
- Jean Lefebvre as Edouard, le fils d'Amélie
- Philippe Olive as Marquis d'Elgoïbar
- Max Montavon as Le garçon d'étage de Paris
- Henri Virlojeux as Le garçon d'étage de province
- Paul Bisciglia as Le chasseur
- Bernard Musson as Le réceptionniste de l'hôtel
- Paul Faivre as Gabriel, le jardinier de Gilbert
- Jackie Sardou as Hélène, la domestique de Gilbert

== Bibliography ==
- Krawc, Alfred. International Directory of Cinematographers, Set- and Costume Designers in Film: France (from the beginnings to 1980). Saur, 1983.
