= Pierre Gérin =

French film producer

- Born: 6 March 1913; Paris, France
- Died: 29 December 1983 (aged 70); Paris, France
- Occupation: Producer
- Years active: 1946 - 1959 (film)

Pierre Gérin (1913–1982) was a French film producer.

== Selected filmography ==
- Not So Stupid (1946)
- The Last Vacation (1948)
- Impeccable Henri (1948)
- White as Snow (1948)
- The Widow and the Innocent (1949)
- Thirst of Men (1950)
- The Man Who Returns from Afar (1950)
- The Night Is My Kingdom (1951)
- The King of Camelots (1951)
- The Love of a Woman (1953)
- Open Letter (1953)
- Adventures of the Barber of Seville (1954)
- Three Sailors (1957)

== Bibliography ==
- Michel Marie. The French New Wave: An Artistic School. John Wiley & Sons, 2008.
