= Fred Langenfeld =

French cinematographer

- Born: 26 May 1908; Calais, France
- Died: 15 May 1954 (aged 46); Nice, France
- Occupation: Cinematographer
- Years active: 1931–1953

Fred Langenfeld (1908–1954) was a French cinematographer. At the beginning of his career he worked at the Joinville Studios of Paramount in Paris.

== Selected filmography ==
- Reckless Youth (1931)
- The Incorrigible (1931)
- When Do You Commit Suicide? (1931)
- Côte d'Azur (1932)
- Topaze (1933)
- Dédé (1935)
- Ferdinand the Roisterer (1935)
- A Legionnaire (1936)
- The Assault (1936)
- The Woman of Monte Carlo (1938)
- In the Sun of Marseille (1938)
- The Two Schemers (1938)
- The Train for Venice (1938)
- Whirlwind of Paris (1939)
- Deputy Eusèbe (1939)
- Strange Suzy (1941)
- Six Little Girls in White (1942)
- Men Without Fear (1942)
- After the Storm (1943)
- Behold Beatrice (1944)
- Death No Longer Awaits (1944)
- Not So Stupid (1946)
- Gringalet (1946)
- Four Knaves (1947)
- Something to Sing About (1947)
- White as Snow (1948)
- The Heart on the Sleeve (1948)
- 56 Rue Pigalle (1949)
- The Wreck (1949)
- Dominique (1950)
- The King of Camelots (1951)
- Never Two Without Three (1951)
- The Convict (1951)
- The Damned Lovers (1952)
- Soyez les bienvenus (1953)

== Bibliography ==
- Hayward, Susan. Simone Signoret: The Star as Cultural Sign. Continuum, 2004.
- Lorcey, Jacques. Bourvil. PAC, 1981.
