= Not So Stupid (1928 film) =

1928 film

- Directed by: André Berthomieu
- Production company: Les Films Célèbres
- Release date: 28 December 1928
- Country: France
- Languages: Silent; French intertitles

Not So Stupid (French: Pas si bête) is a 1928 French silent comedy film directed by André Berthomieu and starring Andrée Gilda, René Lefèvre, and Jean Heuzé. Berthomieu remade the film in 1946.

== Cast ==
- Andrée Gilda
- René Lefèvre
- Jean Heuzé
- Madeleine Carroll
- Jean Diéner
- Hubert Daix
- Charles Frank

== Bibliography ==
- Alfred Krautz. International Directory of Cinematographers Set and Costume Designers in Film: France. Saur, 1983.
