= Gringalet (1959 film) =

- Directed by: Rubén W. Cavallotti
- Written by: Rodolfo M. Taboada
- Based on: Gringalet by Paul Vandenberghe
- Produced by: Enrique Faustin
- Starring: Walter Vidarte; Graciela Borges; Beatriz Taibo
- Cinematography: Alberto Etchebehere
- Edited by: Jorge Gárate
- Music by: Tito Ribero
- Production company: Argentina Sono Film
- Distributed by: Argentina Sono Film
- Release date: 20 August 1959
- Running time: 90 minutes
- Country: Argentina
- Language: Spanish

Gringalet is a 1959 Argentine film directed by Rubén W. Cavalloti and written by Rodolfo M. Taboada from the play by Paul Vandenberghe. It was released by Argentina Sona Films.

== Plot summary ==
A young painter from the La Boca neighborhood discovers that his father is a millionaire, goes to live with him, changes his life and returns to his neighborhood.

== Cast ==
- Walter Vidarte
- Graciela Borges
- Raúl Rossi
- Beatriz Taibo
- Juan Carlos Barbieri
- Maruja Gil Quesada

== Reception ==
Clarín reviewed the director: "Rubén Cavallotti is steadfast as a narrator".

La Razón wrote, "Narration without major aspirations. He transplants pieces of reality onto the screen, but much of what is seen is not new in our cinema".

A Variety review summarized it as a "yarn concerns a light hearted youth in poor circumstances whose fortune improves". The review noted the film's occasional humor, said that Walter Vidarte was miscast as Gringalet, and called the film "an artificial production".
