= The Happiest of Men =

1952 film

- Directed by: Yves Ciampi
- Written by: Fernand Gravey; Jean Halain
- Based on: Je l'aimais trop by Jean Guitton
- Produced by: Henri Bérard; Adry De Carbuccia; Roland Girard
- Starring: Fernand Gravey; Maria Mauban; Jean Parédès
- Cinematography: Marcel Grignon
- Edited by: Roger Dwyre
- Music by: Louiguy
- Production companies: Les Films du Cyclope; Indus Films
- Distributed by: Pathé Consortium Cinéma
- Release date: 26 November 1952
- Running time: 87 minutes
- Country: France
- Language: French

The Happiest of Men (French: Le plus heureux des hommes) is a 1952 French comedy film directed by Yves Ciampi and starring Fernand Gravey, Maria Mauban and Jean Parédès. The film's sets were designed by the art director René Moulaert.

== Synopsis ==
An industrialist who wants to become a painter and an artist who wants to succeed in business gradually switch places, encouraged by a woman.

== Cast ==
- Fernand Gravey as Armand Dupuis-Martin
- Maria Mauban as Sophie Vadier
- Jean Parédès as François Lombard
- Jean-Claude Pascal as Michel Brissac
- Christiane Barry as Florence Dupuis-Martin
- Harry-Max as Moulinot
- Marcel Josz as Borel
- Pierre Mondy as Inspecteur Gaston
- Louis Arbessier as Valise
- Maurice Biraud as Le jeune avocat
- Jacques Denoël as Le barman
- Hélène Duc as L'avocate mondaine
- Paul Faivre as Le juge d'instruction
- Lucien Frégis as L'agent
- Grégoire Gromoff as Un invité au vernissage
- Jacques Morlaine as Le photographe
- André Numès Fils as Le mangeur de cacahètes
- Claude Péran as Inspecteur Allain
- Philippe Richard as Bayadère
- Jean Sylvère as Un invité au vernissage
- Georgette Talazac as La cliente

== Bibliography ==
- Bessy, Maurice & Chirat, Raymond. Histoire du cinéma français: 1951-1955. Pygmalion, 1989.
- Rège, Philippe. Encyclopedia of French Film Directors, Volume 1. Scarecrow Press, 2009.
