= The Last Vacation =

- Directed by: Roger Leenhardt
- Written by: Roger Leenhardt; Maurice Junod; Roger Breuil
- Produced by: Pierre Gérin
- Starring: Odile Versois; Michel François; Jean Lara
- Cinematography: Philippe Agostini
- Edited by: Myriam Borsoutsky
- Music by: Guy Bernard
- Production companies: Les Films Roger Leenhardt; Les Productions Cinématographiques
- Release date: 24 March 1948
- Running time: 95 minutes
- Country: France
- Language: French

The Last Vacation (French: Les dernières vacances) is a 1948 French drama film directed by Roger Leenhardt and starring Odile Versois, Michel François, and Jean Lara. It was shot at the Saint-Maurice Studios in Paris and on location in Languedoc. The film's sets were designed by the art director Léon Barsacq.

== Cast ==
- Odile Versois as Juliette Lherminier
- Michel François as Jacques Simonet
- Jean Lara as Pierre Gabard
- Renée Devillers as Cécile Simonet
- Pierre Dux as Valentin Simonet
- Frédéric Munié as Edouard
- Raymond Farge as Augustin
- Marcelle Monthil as La mère d'Augustin
- Christiane Barry as Tante Odette
- Berthe Bovy as Tante Délie
- Jean d'Yd as Walter Lherminier
- Didier d'Yd as François
- Paul Faivre as M. Belval
- Gérard Gervais as Gérald
- Arlette Wherly as Gladys
- Suzanne Demars as Emma
- Jack Sergy as Philippe
- Liliane Maguy as Solange
- Henri Busquet as André
- Lucy Valnor as Jeanne

== Bibliography ==
- Michel Marie. The French New Wave: An Artistic School. John Wiley & Sons, 2008.
