= I Am with You (1943 film) =

1943 film

- Italian poster
- Directed by: Henri Decoin
- Written by: Pierre Bénard; Fernand Crommelynck; Marcel Rivet
- Produced by: Raymond Borderie; Adrien Remaugé
- Starring: Yvonne Printemps; Pierre Fresnay; Jacques Louvigny
- Cinematography: Nicolas Hayer
- Edited by: Charles Bretoneiche
- Music by: René Sylviano
- Production companies: Compagnie Industrielle et Commerciale Cinématographique; Pathé Consortium Cinéma
- Distributed by: Pathé Consortium Cinéma
- Release date: 22 December 1943
- Running time: 95 minutes
- Country: France
- Language: French

I Am with You (French: Je suis avec toi) is a 1943 French musical comedy film directed by Henri Decoin and starring Yvonne Printemps, Pierre Fresnay and Jacques Louvigny. It was shot at the Joinville Studios in Paris. The film's sets were designed by the art director Lucien Aguettand.

== Synopsis ==
Concerned that her husband may be unfaithful to her, a woman pretends to go on a trip but instead remains in a nearby hotel. When her husband encounters her he believes he has found his wife's exact double.

== Cast ==
- Yvonne Printemps as Élisabeth & Irène
- Pierre Fresnay as François
- Jacques Louvigny as Le commissaire
- Jean Meyer as Armand
- Palau as Le contrôleur
- Luce Fabiole as Tante Ellen
- Denise Benoît as Irma
- André Valmy as Le gérant de l'hôtel
- Guita Karen as Madeleine
- André Varennes as Le général
- Robert Le Fort as Le violoniste
- Annette Poivre as La postière
- Henry Prestat as Le veilleur de nuit
- Henri de Livry as Le portier
- Paulette Dubost as La standardiste
- Bernard Blier as Robert

== Bibliography ==
- Dayna Oscherwitz & MaryEllen Higgins. The A to Z of French Cinema. Scarecrow Press, 2009.
