= My First Love (1945 film) =

1945 film by André Berthomieu

- Directed by: André Berthomieu
- Written by: Paul Vandenberghe
- Based on: Play by Paul Vandenberghe
- Produced by: Roger De Venloo; Raymond Eger; Adrien Remaugé
- Starring: Jacqueline Delubac; Aimé Clariond; Madeleine Suffel
- Cinematography: Jean Bachelet
- Edited by: Henriette Wurtzer
- Music by: Henri Verdun
- Production companies: Majestic Films; Société Nouvelle Pathé Cinéma
- Distributed by: Pathé Consortium Cinéma
- Release date: 12 September 1945
- Running time: 85 minutes
- Country: France
- Language: French

My First Love (French: J'ai dix-sept ans) is a 1945 French comedy drama film directed by André Berthomieu and starring Jacqueline Delubac, Aimé Clariond and Madeleine Suffel. It was based on a play of the same title by Paul Vandenberghe. The film's sets were designed by the art director Raymond Nègre.

The film had admissions in France of 2,442,552.

== Synopsis ==
Bob, a student, is very emotionally close to his mother Suzanne. He is alarmed when she seems about to begin a relationship with a novelist, regarding it as a betrayal.

== Cast ==
- Jacqueline Delubac as Suzanne
- Gérard Nery as Bob
- Aimé Clariond as Le romancier Maurice Fleurville
- Madeleine Suffel as Louise - la femme de chambre
- Jacques Louvigny as L'oncle Victor
- Jacques Famery as René
- Jean Diéner as Le prof de philo
- Paul Faivre as Le prof de première
- Louis Florencie as Le proviseur
- Robert Moor as Firmin, le valet de chambre
- Charles Bouillaud as Le pion
- Christiane Sertilange as Mado
- Guy Loriquet as Ménard

== Bibliography ==
- Bessy, Maurice & Chirat, Raymond. Histoire du cinéma français: encyclopédie des films, 1940–1950. Pygmalion, 1986
