= Berthe Bovy =

Belgian actress (1887–1977)

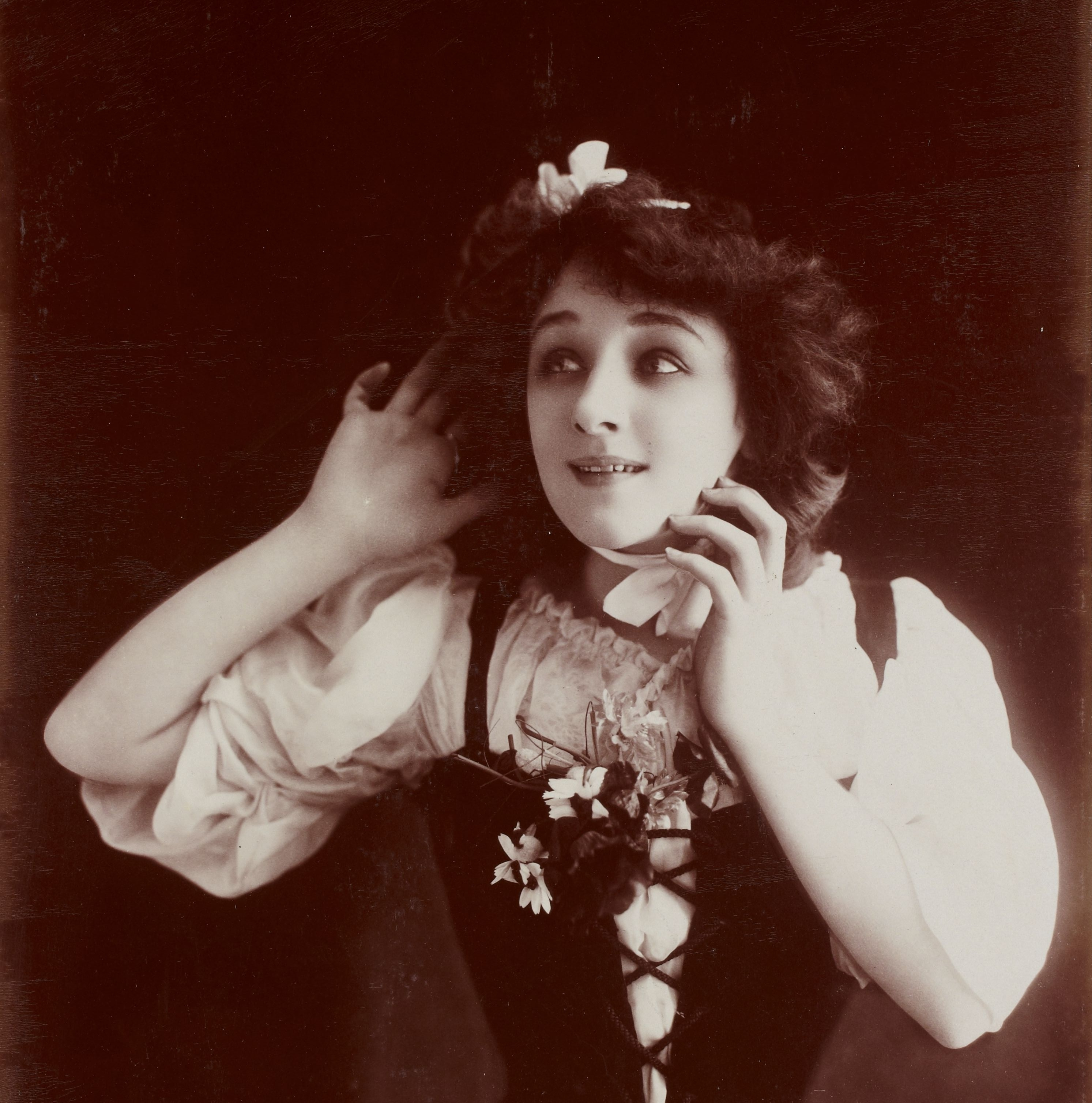
- Born: Berthe Marguerite Jeanne Bovy; 6 January 1887; Cheratte, Belgium
- Died: 27 February 1977 (aged 90); Montgeron, France
- Occupation: Actress
- Years active: 1907–1972
- Spouses: Charles Gribouval; Ion Anton Ion-Don; Pierre Fresnay

Berthe Bovy (6 January 1887 – 26 February 1977), sometimes known as Betty Bovy, was a Belgian actress who appeared in theatre, films and television programmes for over 60 years.

== Biography ==
Born Berthe Marguerite Jeanne Bovy, she was the daughter of poet and journalist Théophile Bovy, she was born in Cheratte, now part of the commune of Visé, in the province of Liège. Seemingly interested in acting from an early age, an interest which her father encouraged, she enrolled in the Koninklijk Conservatorium in Brussels following a meeting with Sarah Bernhardt. From 1904 to 1906 she studied at the CNSAD in Paris. She joined the Comédie-Française in 1907.

She was married and divorced three times, first to Charles Gribouval, secretary of the Comédie-Française, secondly with artist Ion Anton Ion-Don, and thirdly, in 1929, with Pierre Jules Louis Laudenbach, better known by his stage name Pierre Fresnay. She died at Montgeron in France and is buried in the city of Liège.

== Filmography ==
- 1908: The Assassination of the Duke of Guise (Short) - Le page
- 1910: On ne badine pas avec l'amour (Short) - Camille
- 1911: Le roman d'une pauvre fille
- 1912: La conquête du bonheur - Suzette Robert
- 1913: Coeur de femme - Marie-Claire de la Salette
- 1913: Le fils de Lagardère - Bathilde de Wendel
- 1913: Le baiser suprême
- 1913: Le Roman de Carpentier (Short)
- 1921: The Earth - La Trouille
- 1938: Le Joueur - Babouchka
- 1939: Je t'attendrai - Mme Marchand - La mère de Paul
- 1942: The Beautiful Adventure - Madame de Trévillac
- 1945: Boule de Suif - Madame Bonnet
- 1948: The Last Vacation - Tante Délie
- 1948: The Shadow - Mme Fournier
- 1948: D'homme à hommes - La mère de Dunant
- 1948: The Cupboard Was Bare - Madame Lea Lobligeois
- 1949: Fantomas Against Fantomas - La vieille dame
- 1950: La Souricière - Mlle Germaine
- 1951: La Maison Bonnadieu - Madame Ramadin - la grand-mère
- 1954: On Trial - La grand-mère
- 1956: Le Secret de sœur Angèle - La supérieure de Paris
- 1957: Bonjour Toubib - Madame Cohen
- 1962: Mon oncle du Texas - La grand-mère Elisa
- 1967: Le dimanche de la vie - Nanette
- 1971: Aussi loin que l'amour - Une invitée (final film role)
