= The Duratons =

1955 film

- Directed by: André Berthomieu
- Written by: André Berthomieu; Ded Rysel; Jean-Jacques Vital
- Produced by: Jean-Jacques Vital; Robert Woog
- Starring: Jane Sourza; Ded Rysel; Claude Nicot
- Cinematography: Victor Arménise
- Edited by: Gilbert Natot
- Music by: Henri Betti
- Production companies: Films Metzger et Woog; Simoja
- Distributed by: Compagnie Commerciale Française Cinématographique
- Release date: 20 December 1955
- Running time: 90 minutes
- Country: France
- Language: French

The Duratons (French: Les Duraton) is a 1955 French comedy film directed by André Berthomieu and starring Jane Sourza, Ded Rysel and Claude Nicot. It was shot at the Boulogne Studios in Paris and on location in Senlis. The film's sets were designed by the art director Raymond Nègre. It was the second film to be based on the popular radio series The Duraton Family following the 1939 production The Duraton Family directed by Christian Stengel.

== Synopsis ==
Jules Duraton is the local schoolmaster and lives with his family, but he is infuriated by a radio show of an identical name which he believes has made his family a laughing stock. He decides to sue the broadcasters. Matters are complicated when the lawyer hired by the radio company falls in love with Jules Duraton's daughter Solange.

== Cast ==
- Jane Sourza as Irma Duraton
- Ded Rysel as Jules Duraton
- Claude Nicot as Roger Duraton - le fils
- Jean Carmet as Gaston Duvet dans l'émission radiophonique
- Georges Lannes as Hubert Fournier - le directeur de Radio Monde
- Charles Bouillaud as Maître Robinot
- Georges Baconnet as Monsieur Tordu
- Jean Berton as Monsieur Poupinel - l'inspecteur d'académie
- Maurice Dorléac as Le ministre
- Paul Faivre as Le président du tribunal
- Geneviève Morel as Pauline - la bonne des Duraton
- Robert Seller as Le comte de Kerfelus
- Jimmy Urbain as Le petit Michel Lamendin
- Darry Cowl as Monsieur Mathieu - le surveillant général
- Yvonne Galli as Madame Duraton / Elle-même dans l'émission radiophonique
- Jacqueline Cartier as Jacqueline Duraton / Elle-même dans l'émission radiophonique
- Danik Patisson as Solange Duraton
- Roland Alexandre as André Martin

== Bibliography ==
- Dyer, Richard & Vincendeau, Ginette. Popular European Cinema. Routledge, 2013.
- Powrie, Phil & Cadalanu, Marie . The French Film Musical. Bloomsbury Publishing, 2020.
