= The Crime of Bouif (1952 film) =

1952 film

- Directed by: André Cerf
- Written by: André Cerf; André Mouëzy-Éon; Guillaume Hanoteau
- Based on: The Crime of Bouif by André Mouëzy-Éon and Georges de La Fouchardière
- Produced by: Pierre Braunberger
- Starring: Champi; Pierre Jourdan; Fernand Fabre
- Cinematography: Pierre Petit
- Edited by: Andrée Danis
- Music by: Richard Cornu
- Production company: Les Films du Panthéon
- Distributed by: Panthéon Distribution
- Release date: 5 March 1952
- Running time: 85 minutes
- Country: France
- Language: French

The Crime of Bouif (French: Le crime du Bouif) is a 1952 French comedy drama film directed by André Cerf and starring Champi, Pierre Jourdan and Fernand Fabre. It was based on a work by André Mouëzy-Éon and Georges de La Fouchardière which has been adapted for films several times, including a 1933 version. The film's sets were designed by the art director Raymond Nègre.

== Cast ==
- Champi as Bricard dit Le Bouif
- Pierre Jourdan as Exam - le gendre du Bouif
- Fernand Fabre as Xapiros - le propriétaire de l'écurie
- Jean Gaven as Michel
- Frédérique Nadar as Jacqueline - la fille du Bouif
- Catherine Erard as Gaby
- Robert Vattier as Le juge d'instruction
- Luc Andrieux as Le premier policier
- Henri Belly as Le journaliste
- Charles Bouillaud as L'agent Balloche
- Robert Seller as Le comte
- Marcel Meral as Le directeur de l'écurie
- Roger Rafal as Le procureur
- Maurice Jacquemont as Boubou

== Bibliography ==
- Goble, Alan. The Complete Index to Literary Sources in Film. Walter de Gruyter, 1999.
- Rège, Philippe. Encyclopedia of French Film Directors, Volume 1. Scarecrow Press, 2009.
