= Mathilde Casadesus =

French actress (1921–1965)

- Born: 5 May 1921; Paris, France
- Died: 27 August 1965 (aged 44); Menorca, Balearic Islands, Spain
- Other name: Mathilde Lucette Rose Jeanne Casadesus
- Occupation: Actress
- Years active: 1945–1965 (TV & film)

Mathilde Casadesus (1921–1965) was a French film actress.

== Biography ==
Born into a family of renowned musicians, she is the daughter of cellist and composer Marius Casadesus and cellist Lucette Laffite. She is the half-sister of Gréco Casadesus and first cousin of Gisèle Casadesus.

However, she chose to become an actress and, in 1945, began her film career. She appeared in almost thirty films, alongside Bourvil, Fernandel, Gabin and Jean Marais, among others. At the same time, she played numerous roles on stage, and appeared in operettas, notably with Marcel Merkès and Paulette Merval.

Mathilde Casadesus, mother of dancer Lucile Casadesus, died during the filming of How to Steal a Million Dollars with Audrey Hepburn, in which she did not appear.

She died of a heart attack at the age of 44.

She is buried in the Longs Réages cemetery in Meudon.

The Bibliothèque nationale de France holds a portrait of Mathilde Casadesus drawn by Jean Dorville.

== Partial filmography ==
- Box of Dreams (1945) - L'Agitée
- La part de l'ombre (1945)
- The Idiot (1946) - Adélaïde Epantchine
- The Murdered Model (1948) - Madame Malaise
- Tous les deux (1949) - La cliente
- Marlene (1949) - Betty
- The Sinners (1949) - Madame Barattier la Patronne de l'Auberge
- Branquignol (1949) - Suzanne
- King Pandora (1950) - Marika
- The Sleepwalker (1951) - Mademoiselle Thomas
- Le Plaisir (1952) - Madame Louise dite Cocotte (segment "La Maison Tellier")
- The Lady of the Camellias (1953) - Prudence
- The Air of Paris (1954) - Voyageuse
- Ce soir les jupons volent... (1956) - Madame Pommeau
- Gervaise (1956) - Mme Boche - la concierge curieuse
- Burning Fuse (1957) - Mimi
- Me and the Colonel (1958) - Secretary (uncredited)
- Love Is My Profession (1958) - Anna - la patronne du restaurant (uncredited)
- Life Together (1958) - La cuisinière d'Odette
- Le petit prof (1959) - Mme. Boulard
- The Bureaucrats (1959) - Madame Nègre
- Certains l'aiment froide (1960) - Mathilde Rouet, née Valmorin
- Murder at 45 R.P.M. (1960) - Elsa
- Candide ou l'optimisme au XXe siècle (1960) - La baronne de Thunder-Ten-Tronck
- À rebrousse-poil (1961) - Mme. Durand
- Les amours de Paris (1961) - L'infirmière-major
- Conduite à gauche (1962) - La cliente
- The Law of Men (1962) - Madame Thiebaut6
- Le couteau dans la plaie (1962) - Mme. Duval, Concierge
- Moonlight in Maubeuge (1962) - La dame aux courses
- The Reluctant Spy (1963) - Maria Linas - la diva
- Les mordus de Paris (1965)
- Les combinards (1966) - La bouchère de Cussac

== Bibliography ==
- Goble, Alan. The Complete Index to Literary Sources in Film. Walter de Gruyter, 1999.
