= Mademoiselle Josette, My Woman (1950 film) =

1950 film

- Directed by: André Berthomieu
- Written by: Paul Vandenberghe; André Berthomieu
- Based on: Mademoiselle Josette, My Woman by Robert Charvay and Paul Gavault
- Produced by: Roger De Venloo; Roger Ribadeau-Dumas
- Starring: Odile Versois; Fernand Gravey; Robert Arnoux
- Cinematography: Roger Dormoy
- Edited by: Louisette Hautecoeur
- Music by: Georges Van Parys
- Production company: Majestic Films
- Distributed by: La Société des Films Sirius
- Release date: 20 September 1950
- Running time: 92 minutes
- Country: France
- Language: French

Mademoiselle Josette, My Woman (French: Mademoiselle Josette ma femme) is a 1950 French comedy film directed by André Berthomieu and starring Odile Versois, Fernand Gravey and Robert Arnoux. It is based on the 1906 play of the same title by Robert Charvay and Paul Gavault which Berthomieu had previously made into a 1933 film Mademoiselle Josette, My Woman.

The film's sets were designed by Raymond Nègre.

== Cast ==
- Odile Versois as Josette Dupré
- Fernand Gravey as André Ternay
- Robert Arnoux as Panard
- Jean Berton as Le directeur de cabinet
- Charles Bouillaud as Le portier
- Rivers Cadet as Monsieur Dutilleul
- Jacques Essy
- Paul Faivre as Urbain
- Suzanne Guémard as Madame Dupré
- Marcelle Hainia as Madame Dutilleul
- Harry-Max as Le fondé de pouvoirs
- Charles Jarrel as Joe Jackson
- Georges Lannes as Monsieur Dupré
- Marcel Meral as Le valet
- Marcel Mérovée as Le caddie
- Guy Rapp as Le directeur de l'hôpital
- Marcelle Rexiane as Léontine
- Lysiane Rey as Myrianne
- André Versini as Vallorbier

== Bibliography ==
- James L. Limbacher. Haven't I seen you somewhere before?: Remakes, sequels, and series in motion pictures and television, 1896-1978. Pierian Press, 1979.
