= The New Rich =

1938 film

- Directed by: André Berthomieu
- Written by: Charles-Félix Tavano; Roger Ferdinand
- Based on: The New Rich by Charles Albert Abadie and Raymond de Cesse
- Produced by: Fernand Weill
- Starring: Raimu; Michel Simon; Betty Stockfeld
- Cinematography: Georges Benoît
- Edited by: Henri Taverna
- Music by: Marceau Van Hoorebecke
- Production company: Grands Films Artistiques
- Distributed by: Les Films Dispa
- Release date: 15 June 1938
- Running time: 89 minutes
- Country: France
- Language: French

The New Rich (French: Les Nouveaux Riches) is a 1938 French comedy film directed by André Berthomieu and starring Raimu, Michel Simon and Betty Stockfeld. It is based on a 1917 stage farce of the same title by Charles Albert Abadie and Raymond de Cesse. It was shot at the Saint-Maurice Studios in Paris. The film's sets were designed by the art directors Jacques Colombier and Eugène Lourié.

== Synopsis ==
Legendre and Martinet are former workers who have become successful business leaders after winning the lottery. Martinet manages to gain control of their former factory in revenge against their employer, while Legendre is targeted by a chancer who wants him to fund a film starring his girlfriend the attractive Betty. When Legendre discovers that Martinet has mismanaged the factory, he launches a takeover bid and replaces him with his son Georges.

== Cast ==
- Raimu as Legendre
- Michel Simon as Martinet
- Betty Stockfeld as Betty
- Fernand Fabre as Fronsac
- René Bergeron as Chevalier
- Raymond Segard as Georges Martinet
- Gaston Dubosc as Saturnin
- Jean Joffre as Ancelier
- Poussard as Simon
- Marcel Maupi as Jules
- Katia Lova as Evelyne Ancelier
- Germaine Charley as Mme Legendre

== Bibliography ==
- Bessy, Maurice & Chirat, Raymond. Histoire du cinéma français: encyclopédie des films, Volume 2. Pygmalion, 1986.
- Crisp, Colin. Genre, Myth and Convention in the French Cinema, 1929-1939. Indiana University Press, 2002.
- Rège, Philippe. Encyclopedia of French Film Directors, Volume 1. Scarecrow Press, 2009.
