= The Squadron's Baby =

1935 film

- Directed by: René Sti
- Written by: Georges Berr; René Sti
- Produced by: Noë Bloch
- Starring: Michel Simon; Paulette Dubost; Suzy Prim
- Cinematography: Jean Isnard; Louis Née; Armand Thirard
- Edited by: Léonide Moguy
- Music by: Casimir Oberfeld
- Production company: Capitole Films
- Distributed by: Gray-Film
- Release date: 6 December 1935
- Running time: 95 minutes
- Country: France
- Language: French

The Squadron's Baby (French: Le bébé de l'escadron) is a 1935 French comedy film directed by René Sti and starring Michel Simon, Paulette Dubost and Suzy Prim. The film's sets were designed by the art director Eugène Lourié.

== Synopsis ==
Anaïs is seduced by a soldier whose name she does not know and falls pregnant. She persuades the commander to parade the entire garrison so she can find the man.

== Cast ==
- Michel Simon as Perrot-Joly
- Paulette Dubost as Anaïs
- Pierre Larquey as Le fonctionnaire Mazure
- Suzy Prim as Mathilde
- Pierre Brasseur as Max
- Hélène Perdrière as Isabelle
- Paul Azaïs as Fouillard, le soldat au coeur tendre
- Robert Vidalin as Roger
- Jacques Louvigny as L'adjoint
- Henry Roussel as Le Commandant de Gondrecourt

== Bibliography ==
- Bessy, Maurice & Chirat, Raymond. Histoire du cinéma français: 1935-1939. Pygmalion, 1986.
- Crisp, Colin. Genre, Myth and Convention in the French Cinema, 1929-1939. Indiana University Press, 2002.
- Rège, Philippe. Encyclopedia of French Film Directors, Volume 1. Scarecrow Press, 2009.
