= The Stairs Without End =

1943 film

- Directed by: Georges Lacombe
- Written by: Charles Spaak
- Produced by: Joseph Grohando
- Starring: Pierre Fresnay; Madeleine Renaud; Suzy Carrier
- Cinematography: Christian Matras
- Edited by: Raymond Lamy
- Music by: Jean Alfaro ys
- Production company: Les Productions Miramar
- Distributed by: Ciné Sélection
- Release date: 25 August 1943
- Running time: 100 minutes
- Country: France
- Language: French

The Stairs Without End (French: L'escalier sans fin) is a 1943 French drama film directed by Georges Lacombe and starring Pierre Fresnay, Madeleine Renaud and Suzy Carrier.

The film's art direction was by Jean Douarinou.

== Cast ==
- Pierre Fresnay as Pierre
- Madeleine Renaud as Émilienne Périer
- Suzy Carrier as Anne Périer
- Raymond Bussières as Fred
- Colette Darfeuil as Florence
- Fernand Fabre as Stéphane
- France Ellys as Madame Boutron
- Ginette Baudin as Germaine
- Gabrielle Fontan as Madame Bizet
- Jane Maguenat as Madame Le Verrier
- Madeleine Suffel as La concierge
- Jean-Jacques Delbo as Albert
- René Alié as Marco
- Marcel Carpentier as Noblet
- Marcel Pérès as Monsieur Le Verrier
- Odette Barencey as Madame Dubois
- Paul Barge as Brissard
- Henri Bargin
- Michel de Bonnay as Bouboule
- Ellen Briand as Madame Clovis
- Etienne Decroux as Le colonial
- Henry Farty
- Claude Gambier as Raoul
- Georges Gosset as Marcel
- Marie Guilhène
- Marc Hélin as Le régisseur
- Jacqueline Lerinat as Une écuyère
- Palmyre Levasseur as Madame Masson
- Albert Malbert as Masson
- Héléna Manson as Mademoiselle Michaud
- Luis Mariano as Le chanteur
- Frédéric Mariotti
- Nicole Maurel as Suzanne
- Colette Morel
- Julienne Paroli as Madame Pinchard
- Jane Pierson as La fleuriste
- François Richard as Le client de Fred
- Maurice Salabert as Le patron de 'La Fauvette'
- Jean Vincent as Charles
- Roger Vincent as Delormel

== Bibliography ==
- Aitken, Ian. The Concise Routledge Encyclopedia of the Documentary Film. Routledge, 2013.
