= The King of Camelots =

1951 film

- Directed by: André Berthomieu
- Written by: André Berthomieu; Paul Vandenberghe
- Produced by: Pierre Gérin
- Starring: Robert Lamoureux; Colette Ripert; Yves Deniaud
- Cinematography: Fred Langenfeld
- Edited by: Louisette Hautecoeur; Henri Taverna
- Music by: Richard Cornu
- Production companies: Ciné Sélection; Les Productions Cinématographiques
- Distributed by: Ciné Sélection
- Release date: 11 January 1951
- Running time: 84 minutes
- Country: France
- Language: French

The King of Camelots (French: Le roi des camelots) is a 1951 French comedy film directed by André Berthomieu and starring Robert Lamoureux, Colette Ripert and Yves Deniaud. The film's sets were designed by the art director Raymond Nègre.

== Synopsis ==
A young man Robert is initiated into the way of the camelots or street hawkers by the experienced Raymond. Robert is soon a thriving camelot, and begins to teach his own group of protégés.

== Cast ==
- Robert Lamoureux as Robert
- Colette Ripert as Françoise
- Yves Deniaud as Raymond
- Charles Bouillaud as Emile
- Robert Berri as Grand Jo
- Gaston Orbal as Le marquis
- Jacques Gencel as Jeanjean
- Robert Rollis as Fil de fer
- Pierre Mazé as Michel
- Geneviève Morel as Mme Marguerite
- Paul Faivre as Le secrétaire
- Jean Carmet as La Globule
- Lysiane Rey as Yvette

== Bibliography ==
- Hubert-Lacombe, Patricia. Le cinéma français dans la guerre froide: 1946-1956. L'Harmattan, 1996.
- Rège, Philippe. Encyclopedia of French Film Directors, Volume 1. Scarecrow Press, 2009.
