= Loves, Delights and Organs =

1947 film

- Directed by: André Berthomieu
- Written by: Maurice Barry; André Berthomieu; Julien Duvivier; Dominique Nohain; Paul Vandenberghe
- Produced by: François Carron
- Starring: Jean Desailly; Gérard Nery; Catherine Erard
- Cinematography: Jean Bachelet
- Edited by: Henri Taverna
- Music by: Paul Misraki
- Production company: Cygne
- Distributed by: Sirius Films
- Release date: 16 May 1947
- Running time: 97 minutes
- Country: France
- Language: French

Loves, Delights and Organs (French: Amours, délices et orgues) is a 1947 French romantic comedy film directed by André Berthomieu and starring Jean Desailly, Gérard Nery and Catherine Erard. The film's sets were designed by the art director Robert Gys.

== Synopsis ==
In provincial France, a college based in the chateau of a French count is presided over by a jazz-loving principal. He does everything he can to encourage his student's love of life and tries to overcome the count's opposition to his daughter marrying one of the boys.

== Cast ==
- Jean Desailly as Jean Pelletier dit 'Pivoine'
- Gérard Nery as Pierre de Beaucourt
- Catherine Erard as Yolande de Coeur-Joly
- Bernard Lajarrige as Martin
- Dominique Nohain as Etienne Marcay
- Jacques Louvigny as Pacoulin
- Charles Dechamps as Le comte de Coeur-Joly
- Henri Crémieux as Mathieu
- Alice Tissot as Tante Ursule
- Jean Berton as Gouttenoire
- Paul Faivre as Saturnin
- Janine Mareil as Angèle
- Gisèle Pascal as Micheline
- Robert Rollis as Robinot
- Jack Vetter as Bouboule

== Bibliography ==
- Parish, James Robert & Canham, Kingsley. Film Directors Guide: Western Europe. Scarecrow Press, 1976.
- Rège, Philippe. Encyclopedia of French Film Directors, Volume 1. Scarecrow Press, 2009.
