= Gringalet (1946 film) =

1946 film

- Directed by: André Berthomieu
- Written by: André Berthomieu; Paul Vandenberghe
- Based on: Gringalet by Paul Vandenberghe
- Produced by: Adrien Remaugé
- Starring: Charles Vanel; Marguerite Deval; Suzy Carrier
- Cinematography: Fred Langenfeld
- Edited by: Louisette Hautecoeur
- Music by: René Cloërec
- Production company: Société Nouvelle Pathé Cinéma
- Distributed by: Pathé Consortium Cinéma
- Release date: 20 November 1946
- Running time: 105 minutes
- Country: France
- Language: French

Gringalet is a 1946 French comedy film directed by André Berthomieu and starring Charles Vanel, Marguerite Deval and Suzy Carrier. It was based on the play of the same title by Paul Vandenberghe, who co-wrote the screenplay and also appears in the title role. The film was later remade as the 1959 Argentine film Gringalet

The film's sets were designed by the art director Paul-Louis Boutié, contributing to the film's distinct look and feel. Filming took place in France during the mid-1940s, a time when the French film industry was recovering from the effects of World War II. The production benefited from a strong collaboration between the director and the team, including Vandenberghe’s contribution to the screenplay, which enhanced the comedic elements of the original stage play.

== Synopsis ==
Gringalet narrates the story of Lucien Ravaut, played by Charles Vanel, an industrialist and widower who finds he has a clandestine second son. This son, Francis, also known by the nickname "Gringalet," played by Paul Vandenberghe, is a crazy, full-of-life young man, free-spirited and artistic in nature, utterly different from the orderly and established family of Lucien. After being informed of Francis' existence, Lucien invites him into the family's life-a move clearly angering his elder son Philippe and his grandmother. Gringalet's charming and disarming personality quickly won the family over as tension mixed with warmth. His unruly nature mixed well to remind them of joy in life and togetherness; thus, the family eventually embraces him. As the story unfolds, the movie deals with themes in terms of family dynamics, reconciliation, and personality contrast between the disciplined Philippe and the spontaneous Gringalet.

== Reception ==
Upon its release, Gringalet was well-received for its light humor and the great performances by the cast, especially Paul Vandenberghe in the lead role. The appeal of the film lay in its dealing with family relationships and an optimistic message that caught the people trying to regain themselves after the war. The critics remarked on the film's ability to blend slapstick with pathos in a manner that has helped the film stay memorable within French cinema.

== Legacy ==
Besides the commercial success, this film happened to become so successful internationally that a later remake was done in Argentine in 1959. Gringalet is the classical example of post-war French comedy with its dynamic of modernity and tradition, along with offering commentary on the place of family in a rapidly shifting society.

== Cast ==
- Charles Vanel as Lucien Ravaut
- Marguerite Deval as Madame Bachelet
- Suzy Carrier as Josette Blanchard
- Jimmy Gaillard as Philippe Ravaut
- Paul Vandenberghe as Francis Ravaut dit Gringalet
- Paul Faivre as Emile Moret
- Alain Romans as Le pianiste
- Marcelle Hainia as Madame Blanchard
- Christiane Sertilange as Minouche
- Jacques Louvigny as Monsiieur Blanchard
- André Bervil
- Fernand Rauzéna
- Henry Prestat

== Bibliography ==
- Goble, Alan. The Complete Index to Literary Sources in Film. Walter de Gruyter, 1999.
