= Boule de Suif (1945 film) =

- Directed by: Christian-Jaque
- Starring: Micheline Presle; Louis Salou; Berthe Bovy
- Release date: 1945
- Running time: 103 minutes
- Country: France
- Language: French
- Box office: 3,000,550 admissions (France)

Boule de Suif (released in English-speaking countries as Angel and Sinner) is a black and white 1945 French drama film directed by Christian-Jaque and starring Micheline Presle, Berthe Bovy and Louise Conte.

== Background ==
The film was released in the autumn of 1945, and was the first French film incorporating the theme of resistance. It is an adaptation of two short stories by Guy de Maupassant Boule de suif and Mademoiselle Fifi, which are inter-weaved, and is set during the Franco-Prussian War. A reviewer in Britain noted its "sense of humour, drama, satire and technical skill".

A group of inhabitants of Rouen, travelling for various reasons by stagecoach to Le Havre, includes a prostitute, Élisabeth Rousset, known as Boule de Suif, who is generous and helpful to the others in the carriage, all but one of whom disdain her, but is confronted by their stupidity and complacency. They are detained at a tavern in Tôtes until Boule de Suif submits to the demands of the Prussian officer in residence there. Later, Boule de Suif murders the arrogant Prussian lieutenant (whom his friends nicknamed Fifi) and who had shamelessly displayed his taste for plunder and his sadistic inclinations, before she flees.

== Cast ==
- Micheline Presle : Élisabeth Rousset (a prostitute, nicknamed 'Boule de Suif'. who was a French patriot resisted during the Franco-Prussian War.
- Louis Salou : A Prussian officer nicknamed "Fifi"
- Berthe Bovy : Mme Bonnet
- Alfred Adam : Cornudet
- Jean Brochard : Auguste Loiseau
- Suzet Maïs : Mme Loiseau
- Marcel Simon : Le comte Hubert de Bréville
- Louise Conte : La comtesse de Bréville
- Pierre Palau : Edmond Carré-Lamadon
- Janine Viénot : Mme Carré-Lamadon
- Jean Sinoël : Mr Follenvie, the tavern owner
- Gabrielle Fontan : Mme Follenvie
- Berthe Tissen : Daughter of a militia man
- Mona Dol : The sister
- Roger Karl : The major-Colonel
- Jim Gérald : Captain Von Kerfenstein
- Michel Salina : The officer musician
- Denis d'Inès : The curé d'Uville
- Georges Tourreil : The chief of the independent militia (franc-tireur)
- Marcel Mouloudji : A franc-tireur
- Pierre Duncan : A franc-tireur
- Nicolas Bataille : A franc-tireur
- Albert Malbert : Coachman
- Paul Faivre : Poitevin
- Robert Dalban : Oskar
- Howard Vernon : A Prussian
- Marcel Rouzé : Poitevin's servant
- Jean Werner : A Prussian

== Reception ==
It was one of the most popular films of the year in France in 1945.
