= André Cerf =

French actor, screenwriter, film director

- Born: 31 October 1902; Paris, France
- Died: 3 December 1993 (aged 91); Neuilly-sur-Seine, France
- Occupations: Director, screenwriter, actor
- Years active: 1926–1975 (film & TV)

André Cerf (October 31, 1902 – December 3, 1993) was a French screenwriter, actor and film director. He also worked as an assistant director on a number of films including Anatole Litvak's The Crew (1935). He was married to the actress Alix Mahieux.

== Biography ==
He worked as an assistant to Jean Renoir, Marcel L'Herbier, René Clair, Anatole Litvak, Fedor Ozep, and Alexandre Esway.Roger Boussinot, L'Encyclopédie du Cinéma, Ed. Bordas, 1986 p. 256 After writing the screenplay for the film Radio-Folie in 1931, he directed his first feature in 1935, Le Médecin de service. He disappeared from the screen between 1935 and 1947 before returning to cinema as a screenwriter.

He married actress Alix Mahieux.

He is buried in the cimetière nouveau de Neuilly-sur-Seine (division 23).

== Selected filmography ==
- If I Were Boss (1934)
- Forty Little Mothers (1936)
- The Citadel of Silence (1937)
- La Comédie du bonheur (1940)
- The Bouquinquant Brothers (1947)
- The Red Signal (1949)
- La veuve et l'innocent (1949)
- The Widow and the Innocent (1949)
- The Marriage of Mademoiselle Beulemans (1950)
- The Crime of Bouif (1952)

== Bibliography ==
- Bergan, Ronald. Jean Renoir: Projections of Paradise. Skyhorse, 2016.
- Capua, Michelangelo. Anatole Litvak: The Life and Films. McFarland, 2015.
- Rège, Philippe. Encyclopedia of French Film Directors, Volume 1. Scarecrow Press, 2009.
