= King Pandora =

1950 film

- Directed by: André Berthomieu
- Written by: André Berthomieu; Pierre Ferrari; André Hornez; Robert Picq
- Based on: Le Roi Pandore by Maurice Coriem
- Produced by: Ray Ventura
- Starring: Bourvil; Mathilde Casadesus; Paulette Dubost
- Cinematography: Charles Suin
- Edited by: Louisette Hautecoeur
- Music by: Bruno Coquatrix
- Production company: Hoche Productions
- Distributed by: Héraut Film
- Release date: 31 March 1950
- Running time: 95 minutes
- Country: France
- Language: French
- Box office: 3 625 511 admissions (France)

King Pandora (French: Le Roi Pandore) is a 1950 French comedy film directed by André Berthomieu and starring Bourvil, Mathilde Casadesus and Paulette Dubost. It was a sizeable box office hit. It was shot at the Saint-Maurice Studios in Paris. The film's sets were designed by the art director Raymond Nègre.

== Synopsis ==
Following a large inheritance policemen Léon Ménard marries the attractive Queen Marika. However, he is swindled out of his money and returns to the police. His wife, deeply in love with him, is happy with this.

== Cast ==
- Bourvil as Léon Ménard
- Mathilde Casadesus as Marika
- Paulette Dubost as Angèle
- Charles Bouillaud as Grenu
- Frédéric O'Brady as Toliev
- Arthur Allan as Pilovar
- Gaston Orbal as Le capitaine
- Paul Faivre as Le maire
- Pierre Clarel as L'ambassadeur
- Jean Richard as Quichenette
- Rivers Cadet as Célestin
- Marcel Meral as Un garçon de café
- Charles Lavialle as Le vagabond
- Max Elloy as Un créancier
- Georges Lannes as Adrien Cochard

== Bibliography ==
- Crisp, Colin. French Cinema—A Critical Filmography: Volume 2, 1940–1958. Indiana University Press, 2015.
