= Dawn Devils =

1946 film

- Directed by: Yves Allégret
- Written by: Yves Allégret; Maurice Aubergé; Jean Ferry
- Produced by: Roger Sallard; Jean Le Duc; François Carron
- Starring: Georges Marchal; André Valmy; Dominique Nohain; Jacqueline Pierreux
- Cinematography: Jean Bourgoin
- Edited by: Jacques Grassi
- Music by: Arthur Honegger; Arthur Hoérée
- Production company: Gaumont
- Distributed by: Gaumont Distribution; Compagnie Parisienne de Location de Films
- Release date: 9 April 1946
- Running time: 100 minutes
- Country: France
- Language: French

Dawn Devils (French: Les démons de l'aube) is a 1946 French war drama film directed by Yves Allégret and starring Georges Marchal, André Valmy, Dominique Nohain and Jacqueline Pierreux. It was shot at the Victorine Studios in Nice. The film's sets were designed by the art director Georges Wakhévitch.

== Cast ==
- Georges Marchal as Lieutenant Claude Legrand
- André Valmy as Serge Duhamel
- Dominique Nohain as Simon dit Chouchou
- Jacqueline Pierreux as Simone
- Marcel Lupovici as Michel Courant
- Jean Carmet as Durand, dit Durandal
- René Clermont as Un des commandos
- Joé Davray as Fillette
- Jacques Dynam as Gauthier
- Raymond Hermantier as Un des commandos
- Marcel Mérovée as Rousseau
- Jean Pommier as Denis
- Jeff Racine as Gaston de Chanteloup
- Robert Rollis as Blot
- Maurice Régamey as Martin
- Henri San Juan as Un des commandos
- Jacques Sommet as Jaloux
- Fernand René as Le père Poilu
- Jean-François Martial as Un officier allemand
- Simone Signoret as Lily, la cabaretière

== Bibliography ==
- Bessy, Maurice & Chirat, Raymond. Histoire du cinéma français: encyclopédie des films, 1940–1950. Pygmalion, 1986
- DeMaio, Patricia A. Garden of Dreams: The Life of Simone Signoret. Univ. Press of Mississippi, 2014.
- Rège, Philippe. Encyclopedia of French Film Directors, Volume 1. Scarecrow Press, 2009.
