= Raymond Nègre =

French art director

- Born: 13th of July 1908; Domjulien, Vosges, France
- Died: 8th of July 1985 (at 76 years old); Créteil, Val-de-Marne, France
- Occupations: production designer and artistic designor
- Years active: 1937-1971 (film)

Raymond Nègre was a French art director born on 13 July 1908 in Domjulien, Vosges, France and died on the 8th of July 1985 in Créteil (Val-de-Marne). He was active in the film industry from the 1930s until the 1970s in more than sixty films of this period.

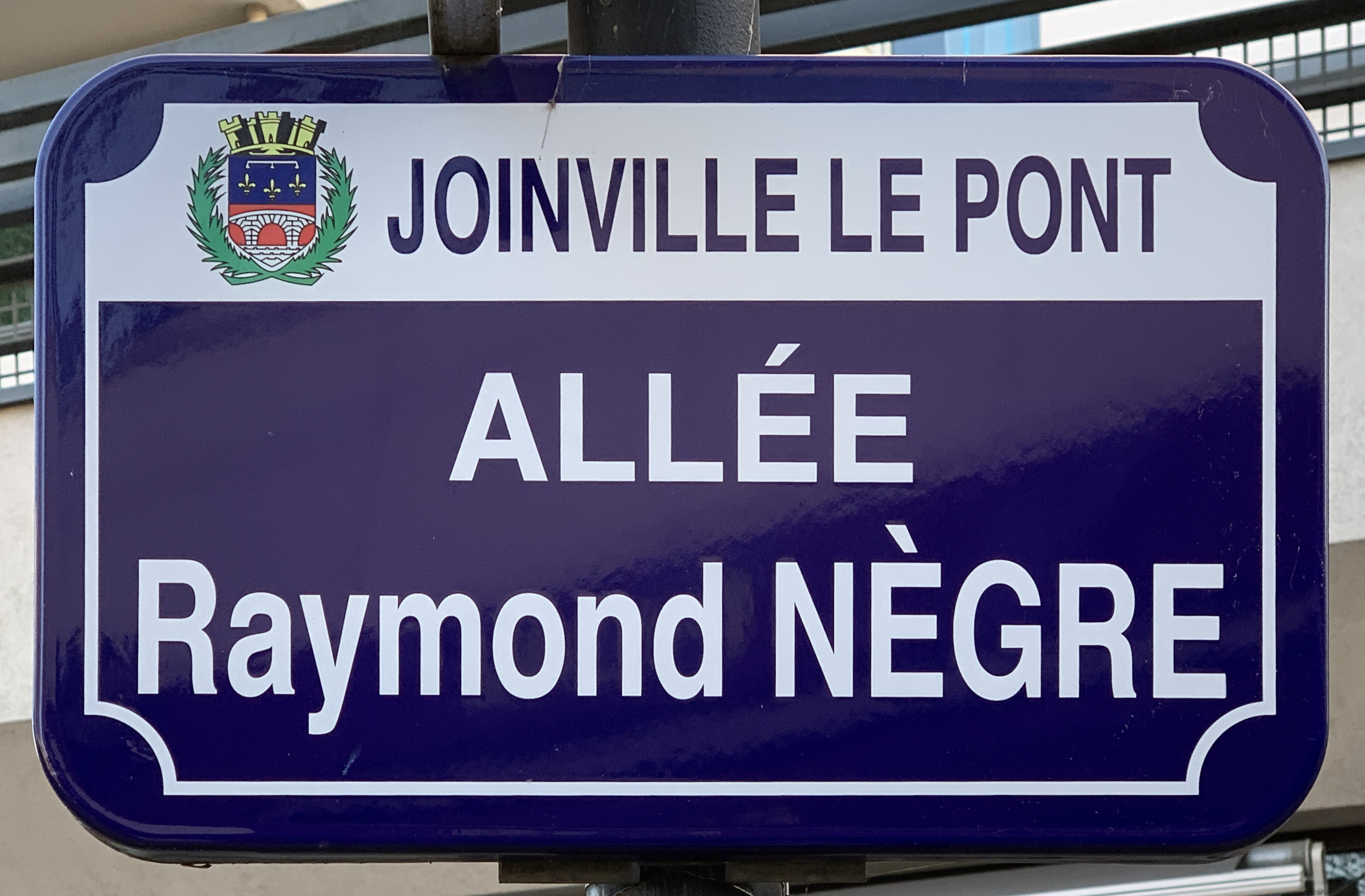
Street sign in Joinville le Pont.

== Family ==
Raymond Nègre is the father of the painter Osanne and the chief decorator and artistic director Alain Nègre.

== Posterity ==
The municipality of Joinville-le-Pont paid homage to him by christening one of the roads in the Palissy district allée Raymond Nègrel.

== Selected filmography ==
Cinema:

- Home Port (1943)
- My First Love (1945)
- Resistance (1945)
- Not So Stupid (1946)
- Women's Games (1946)
- Devil's Daughter (1946)
- Four Knaves (1947)
- Monsieur de Falindor (1947)
- The Village of Wrath (1947)
- Three Boys, One Girl (1948)
- The Firemen's Ball (1948)
- The Shadow (1948)
- The Heart on the Sleeve (1948)
- White as Snow (1948)
- The Nude Woman (1949)
- The Chocolate Girl (1950)
- Mademoiselle Josette, My Woman (1950)
- We Will All Go to Paris (1950)
- King Pandora (1950)
- Bernard and the Lion (1951)
- The King of Camelots (1951)
- Never Two Without Three (1951)
- The Crime of Bouif (1952)
- Jocelyn (1952)
- Wonderful Mentality (1953)
- After You Duchess (1954)
- Four Days in Paris (1955)
- The Duratons (1955)
- In the Manner of Sherlock Holmes (1956)
- Love in Jamaica (1957)
- White Cargo (1958)
- Certains l'aiment froide (1960) starring French star Louis de Funès
- Dans l'eau qui fait des bulles (1961) starring Louis de Funès
- L'Âne et le Bœuf (1962), short film

For television:

- Hauteclaire ou le Bonheur dans le crime (Television film, 1961)
- La Belle Équipe (Television, 1962)
- Marie Tudor, TV film of Abel Gance for the ORTF (1966)
- En votre âme et conscience, épisode : L'Affaire Lacoste from René Lucot (1969)
- Ubu enchaîné (television, 1971)
- Melody (television, 1971)

== Bibliography ==
- Hayward, Susan. Simone Signoret: The Star as Cultural Sign. Continuum, 2004.
