= Never Two Without Three =

1951 film

- Belgian poster
- Directed by: André Berthomieu
- Written by: André Berthomieu; Michel Dulud; André Hornez; Fernand Sardou
- Produced by: Robert Dorfmann; Ray Ventura
- Starring: Roger Nicolas; Marthe Mercadier; Alice Tissot
- Cinematography: Fred Langenfeld
- Edited by: Louisette Hautecoeur
- Music by: Bruno Coquatrix
- Production companies: Hoche Productions; Silver Films
- Distributed by: Les Films Corona
- Release date: 22 November 1951
- Running time: 96 minutes
- Country: France
- Language: French

Never Two Without Three (French: Jamais deux sans trois) is a 1951 French comedy film directed by André Berthomieu and starring Roger Nicolas, Marthe Mercadier and Alice Tissot. The film's sets were designed by the art director Raymond Nègre.

== Cast ==
- Roger Nicolas as Bernard, Henri et Camille Benoit
- Marthe Mercadier as Hélène Flouc de la Donzelle
- Alice Tissot as La baronne Flouc de la Donzelle
- Mona Goya as Rita Malaquais
- Doris Marnier as Suzy
- Jean Toulout as Roberval
- Georges Baconnet as Le père Benoît
- Georges Lannes as Alexandre Mouthon
- Charles Bouillaud as Joseph dit Jojo
- Charles Rigoulot as Freddy
- Nicolas Amato as Le garçon de salle
- Robert Rollis as Le caviste
- Palmyre Levasseur as La concierge
- Léon Larive as L'invité
- Harry-Max as Le maître d'hôtel
- Blanche Denège as La marraine
- Maurice Dorléac as Le directeur de la radio

== Bibliography ==
- Bessy, Maurice & Chirat, Raymond. Histoire du cinéma français: 1951-1955. Pygmalion, 1989.
- Rège, Philippe. Encyclopedia of French Film Directors, Volume 1. Scarecrow Press, 2009.
