= Colonel Pontcarral =

1942 film

- Directed by: Jean Delannoy
- Written by: Bernard Zimmer
- Based on: Colonel Pontcarral by Alberic Cahuet
- Produced by: Raymond Borderie
- Starring: Pierre Blanchar; Annie Ducaux; Suzy Carrier
- Cinematography: Christian Matras
- Edited by: Jeannette Berton
- Music by: Louis Beydts
- Production company: Pathé Consortium Cinéma
- Distributed by: Pathé Consortium Cinéma
- Release date: 30 November 1942
- Running time: 125 minutes
- Country: France
- Language: French

Colonel Pontcarral or Pontcarral, Colonel of the Empire (French: Pontcarral, colonel d'empire) is a 1942 French historical drama film directed by Jean Delannoy and starring Pierre Blanchar, Annie Ducaux and Suzy Carrier. The film's sets were designed by the art director Serge Piménoff while the costumes were by Georges Annenkov.

== Synopsis ==
Pontcarral, a colonel of the First French Empire, remains loyal to the memory of the deposed Napoleon. He struggles to accept the new France of the Bourbon Restoration and lives on his estate in the Dordogne. He enters into a complex relationship with his new wife. Following the July Revolution he is restored to his former rank and volunteers to serve in the Conquest of Algeria.

== Cast ==
- Pierre Blanchar as Pontcarral
- Annie Ducaux as Garlone
- Suzy Carrier as Sybille
- Charles Granval as Le marquis de Ransac
- Jean Marchat as Hubert de Rozans
- Charlotte Lysès as Madame de Mareilhac
- Guillaume de Sax as Le général
- Marcel Delaître as Austerlitz
- Simone Valère as Blanche de Mareilhac
- Jacques Louvigny as Mareilhac
- Lucien Nat as Garron
- Alexandre Rignault as La facteur
- Jean Chaduc as Frédéric Chopin
- Marc Dantzer as Franz Liszt
- Robert Christidès as Alexandre Dumas
- Madeleine Suffel as Marthe
- Renée Thorel as Madame de Saint-Sory
- Léonce Corne as L'huissier
- Jean Joffre as L'aubergiste
- Alexandre Mihalesco as Un conspirateur
- André Carnège as Le procureur du roi
- Jean Pignol as Le capitaine

== Bibliography ==
- Rège, Philippe. Encyclopedia of French Film Directors, Volume 1. Scarecrow Press, 2009.
- Sieglohr, Ulrike (ed.) Heroines Without Heroes: Reconstructing Female and National Identities in European Cinema, 1945-51. Bloomsbury Publishing, 2016.
- Williams, Alan Larson. Republic of Images: A History of French Filmmaking. Harvard University Press, 1992.
