= The Last Robin Hood =

1953 film

- Directed by: André Berthomieu
- Written by: André Berthomieu; Gérard Carlier; Paul Vandenberghe
- Produced by: Roger Ribadeau-Dumas
- Starring: Roger Nicolas; Nicole Maurey; Lucien Nat
- Cinematography: Georges Million
- Edited by: Monique Isnardon; Robert Isnardon
- Music by: Henri Betti
- Production company: Société Française de Cinématographie
- Distributed by: La Société des Films Sirius
- Release date: 10 April 1953
- Running time: 93 minutes
- Country: France
- Language: French

The Last Robin Hood (French: Le dernier Robin des Bois) is a 1953 French comedy film directed by André Berthomieu and starring Roger Nicolas, Nicole Maurey and Lucien Nat. The film's sets were designed by the art director Paul-Louis Boutié.

== Synopsis ==
A supervisor at a French summer camp entertains the children by dressing up as Robin Hood. When a young woman who lives in a nearby castle is kidnapped he goes to her rescue with the assistance of the children.

== Cast ==
- Roger Nicolas as Ludovic Dubois
- Nicole Maurey as Isabelle Delorme
- Lucien Nat as Antoine Lévêque
- Luc Andrieux as Un complice
- Raoul Marco as Le principal
- Albert Michel as Un gendarme
- Michel Dumur as Un gosse
- Jacques Gencel as Un gosse
- Serge Lecointe as Un gosse
- Yves Derangère as Un gosse
- Charles Bouillaud as Julien
- Henri Vilbert as L'inspecteur des douanes
- Paul Faivre as Gustave

== Bibliography ==
- Rège, Philippe. Encyclopedia of French Film Directors, Volume 1. Scarecrow Press, 2009.
