= André Versini =

French actor and screenwriter

- Born: 23 November 1923; Saint-Mandé, Val-de-Marne, France
- Died: 8 December 1966 (aged 43); Paris, France
- Occupations: Actor, Writer, Director
- Years active: 1948-1966 (film)

André Versini (1923–1966) was a French film actor and screenwriter. He also directed a couple of films.

== Selected filmography ==
- The Firemen's Ball (1948)
- Thus Finishes the Night (1949)
- The Widow and the Innocent (1949)
- No Pity for Women (1950)
- They Are Twenty (1950)
- Mademoiselle Josette, My Woman (1950)
- The Straw Lover (1951)
- Crimson Curtain (1952)
- They Were Five (1952)
- The Secret of Helene Marimon (1954)
- Queen Margot (1954)
- Leguignon the Healer (1954)
- Je suis un sentimental (1955)
- It Happened in Aden (1956)
- The Babes in the Secret Service (1956)
- Anyone Can Kill Me (1957)
- The Cat (1958)
- Nathalie, Secret Agent (1959)
- I Spit on Your Grave (1959)
- Venetian Honeymoon (1959)
- The Fabiani Affair (1962)
- Mandrin (1962)
- Mission to Venice (1964)

== Bibliography ==
- Capua, Michelangelo. Anatole Litvak: The Life and Films. McFarland, 2015.
- Hayward, Susan. French Costume Drama of the 1950s: Fashioning Politics in Film. Intellect Books, 2010.
