= Not So Stupid (1946 film) =

1946 film

- Directed by: André Berthomieu
- Written by: André Berthomieu; Paul Vandenberghe
- Produced by: Pierre Gérin; Robert Prévot
- Starring: Bourvil; Suzy Carrier; Bernard Lancret
- Cinematography: Pierre Franchi; Fred Langenfeld
- Edited by: Jeannette Berton
- Music by: Étienne Lorin; Maurice Thiriet; Georges Van Parys
- Production company: Les Productions Cinématographiques
- Distributed by: Ciné Sélection
- Release date: 25 December 1946
- Running time: 100 minutes
- Country: France
- Language: French
- Box office: 6,165,419 admissions (France)

Not So Stupid (French: Pas si bête) is a 1946 French comedy film directed by André Berthomieu and starring Bourvil, Suzy Carrier and Bernard Lancret. In 1928 Berthomieu had made a silent film of the same name. This was Bourvil's first film; originally a musician and singer, he went on to become one of the great comic actors of French cinema.

The film's art direction was by Raymond Nègre. It was shot at the Cité Elgé studios in Paris.

== Plot summary ==
"Pas si bête" is a comedy about social differences and appearances. Léon Ménard (Bourvil), a farmer and an apparently simple man of the country, is invited to visit his uncle Henri Ménard (Albert Duvaleix), a prosperous industrialist. He encounters a number of people scheming to marry into the Ménard family for the sake of money. Ménard discovers and thwart the plots and manages to unite a young couple who truly are in love. The romantic comedy ends happily with a double marriage. Henri's daughter Nicole (Suzy Carrier) marries Didier (Bernard Lancret), and Ménard marries his new-found love Rosine (Jacqueline Beyrot). It turns out that Léon is "not so stupid" after all.

== Cast ==
- Bourvil as Lèon Ménard
- Suzy Carrier as Nicole
- Bernard Lancret as Didier
- Yvette Andréyor as Mademoiselle
- Mona Goya as Gaby
- Albert Duvaleix as Henri
- Charles Bouillaud as Joseph
- Gaston Mauger as Le père de léon
- Paul Faivre as Le notaire
- Made Siamé as La mère ménard
- Jacqueline Beyrot as Rosine
- Frédéric Munié
- Léon Daubrel
- Jean Gabert
- Yves Deniaud as Antony
- Jacques Louvigny as De bellemont

== Bibliography ==
- Janis L. Pallister & Ruth A. Hottell. Francophone Women Film Directors: A Guide. Fairleigh Dickinson Univ Press, 2005.
