= To the Eyes of Memory =

1948 film

- Directed by: Jean Delannoy
- Written by: Jean Delannoy; Henri Jeanson; Georges Neveux
- Starring: Michèle Morgan; Jean Marais; Jean Chevrier
- Cinematography: Robert Lefebvre
- Edited by: James Cuenet
- Music by: Georges Auric
- Production company: Les Films Gibé
- Distributed by: Pathé Consortium Cinéma
- Release date: 24 November 1948
- Running time: 105 minutes
- Country: France
- Language: French
- Box office: 4,559,689 admissions (France)

To the Eyes of Memory (French: Aux yeux du souvenir) is a 1948 French romantic drama film directed by Jean Delannoy and starring Michèle Morgan, Jean Marais and Jean Chevrier. Delannoy co-wrote screenplay with Henri Jeanson and Georges Neveux. It was shot at the Francoeur and Joinville Studios in Paris. The film's sets were designed by the art director René Renoux. The admissions in France were 4,559,689 people. It was nominated for a Golden Lion for Delannoy at 1949 Venice Film Festival.

== Cast ==
- Michèle Morgan as Claire Magny
- Jean Marais as Jacques Forester
- Jean Chevrier as Le commandant Pierre Aubry
- Robert Murzeau as Paul Marcadout
- René Simon as En personne / Himself
- Jacques Louvigny as Le passager
- Jim Gérald as Le major
- Jeannette Batti as Ketty
- Colette Mars as Marcelle Marinier
- Daniel Ivernel as Bordas, le radio
- Philippe Lemaire as Un pilote
- Germaine Michel as La logeuse
- Yette Lucas as Mme Bastide
- Moune de Rivel as La chanteuse du night-club
- Marfa d'Hervilly as Une passagère
- Albert Duvaleix as Un passager
- Nicole Courcel as Une élève du cours Simon
- Robert Hossein as Un élève du cours Simon
- Philippe Nicaud as Un élève du cours Simon

== Bibliography ==
- Daniel Biltereyst, Richard Maltby & Philippe Meers. Cinema, Audiences and Modernity: New Perspectives on European Cinema History. Routledge, 2013.
