= Paul Vandenberghe =

French screenwriter

- Born: 31 July 1912; Rouen, Seine-Maritime, France
- Died: 1 May 1961 (aged 48); Clichy, Hauts-de-Seine, France
- Occupations: Writer, director, actor
- Years active: 1945–1960 (film)

Paul Vandenberghe (1912–1961) was a French actor, screenwriter and playwright. He also co-directed two films.

== Selected filmography ==
- My First Love (1945)
- Gringalet (1946)
- Not So Stupid (1946)
- Loves, Delights and Organs (1947)
- The Heart on the Sleeve (1948)
- White as Snow (1948)
- Mademoiselle Josette, My Woman (1950)
- The King of Camelots (1951)
- The Last Robin Hood (1953)

== Bibliography ==
- Goble, Alan. The Complete Index to Literary Sources in Film. Walter de Gruyter, 1999.
