= White as Snow (1948 film) =

1948 film

- Directed by: André Berthomieu
- Screenplay by: André Berthomieu; Paul Vandenberghe
- Produced by: Pierre Gérin
- Starring: Bourvil; Mona Goya; Paulette Dubost
- Cinematography: Fred Langenfeld
- Edited by: Henri Taverna
- Music by: Étienne Lorin; Georges Van Parys
- Production company: Les Productions Cinématographiques
- Distributed by: Les Films Constellation
- Release date: 28 April 1948
- Running time: 100 minutes
- Country: France
- Language: French

White as Snow (French: Blanc comme neige) is a 1948 French comedy film directed by André Berthomieu and starring Bourvil, Mona Goya and Paulette Dubost. It was shot at the Saint-Maurice Studios in Paris. The film's sets were designed by the art director Raymond Nègre. It was a hit, with admissions in France of 3,666,283.

== Cast ==
- Bourvil as Léon Ménard
- Mona Goya as Suzy Rexy
- Paulette Dubost as Charlotte Béloiseau
- Robert Berri as Bob
- Pauline Carton as Madame Potinel
- Frédéric O'Brady as Van Golden
- Louis Florencie as Monsieur Martin
- Charles Bouillaud as L'inspecteur Robillard
- Jean Diéner as Le président du tribunal
- Paul Faivre as Paul dit Popaul - le bistrot
- Marcel Meral as Le concierge de l'hôtel
- Harry-Max as Le juge d'instruction
- Gaston Orbal as Le chef de l'orphéon
- Alice Tissot as Mademoiselle de Brézoles
- Jacques Louvigny as Maître Floridor

== Bibliography ==
- Garçon, François. La distribution cinématographique en France: 1907-1957. CNRS, 2006
- Rège, Philippe. Encyclopedia of French Film Directors, Volume 1. Scarecrow Press, 2009.
