= The Heart on the Sleeve =

1948 film

- Directed by: André Berthomieu
- Screenplay by: André Berthomieu; Paul Vandenberghe
- Produced by: Jean Mugeli
- Starring: Bourvil; Michèle Philippe; Jacques Louvigny
- Cinematography: Fred Langenfeld
- Edited by: Jeannette Berton; Claude Gros
- Music by: Georges Van Parys
- Production company: Union Cinématographique Lyonnaise
- Distributed by: S.R.O.
- Release date: 22 December 1948
- Running time: 95 minutes
- Country: France
- Language: French

The Heart on the Sleeve (French: Le Coeur sur la main) is a 1948 French comedy film directed by André Berthomieu and starring Bourvil, Michèle Philippe and Jacques Louvigny. It was shot at the Billancourt Studios in Paris and on location in the city. The film's sets were designed by the art director Raymond Nègre. It had admissions in France of 3,657,951.

== Plot ==
Léo Ménard works as a sexton in a small parish. When the Parisian singer Mary Pinson performs in his village he's asked to accompany her on his accordion, because the pianist is unavailable. His nightly performance causes a scandal in the Catholic community and he loses his job. He leaves to Paris to look up the singer.

== Main cast ==
- Bourvil as Leon Ménard - le bedeau d'un village normand qui devient vedette de cabaret
- Michèle Philippe as Mary Pinson - une chanteuse don't s'éprend Léon
- Lolita De Silva as Solange - la fille du cirque
- Robert Berri as Alex - le fiancé de Mary
- Jacques Louvigny as Martineau - l'imprésario
- Charles Bouillaud as Paulo - le guitariste
- Paul Faivre as Le curé
- Blanche Denège as Augustine - la bonne du curé
- Marcelle Monthil as Mademoiselle Aglaé

== Bibliography ==
- Rège, Philippe. Encyclopedia of French Film Directors, Volume 1. Scarecrow Press, 2009.
