= Henri Taverna =

French film editor

- Occupation: Film editor
- Years active: 1933-1974 (film)

Henri Taverna was a French film editor. He worked on more than seventy productions between 1933 and 1974.

He was married to Louisette Hautecoeur, who was also a film editor.

== Selected filmography ==
- Ciboulette (1933)
- Paloma Fair (1935)
- Southern Mail (1937)
- The Moorish Queen (1937)
- The New Rich (1938)
- Savage Brigade (1939)
- Deputy Eusèbe (1939)
- The Marvelous Night (1940)
- The Mondesir Heir (1940)
- The Snow on the Footsteps (1942)
- The Beautiful Adventure (1942)
- Death No Longer Awaits (1944)
- The Great Pack (1945)
- Pétrus (1946)
- The Lost Village (1947)
- The Marriage of Ramuntcho (1947)
- Loves, Delights and Organs (1947)
- Impeccable Henri (1948)
- The Cupboard Was Bare (1948)
- White as Snow (1948)
- The Nude Woman (1949)
- The Chocolate Girl (1950)
- Prelude to Glory (1950)
- Adventures of Captain Fabian (1951)
- The King of Camelots (1951)
- The Night Is My Kingdom (1951)
- The Lady from Boston (1951)
- Wolves Hunt at Night (1952)
- The Call of Destiny (1953)
- Mademoiselle from Paris (1955)
- Maigret Sets a Trap (1958)
- Maigret and the Saint-Fiacre Case (1959)
- Guinguette (1959)
- Rendezvous (1961)
- The Nina B. Affair (1961)
- The Triumph of Michael Strogoff (1961)
- Mathias Sandorf (1963)
- The Majordomo (1965)
- Piaf (1974)

== Bibliography ==
- McNulty, Thomas. Errol Flynn: The Life and Career. McFarland, 2011.
