= Resistance (1945 film) =

1945 film by André Berthomieu

Resistance is a 1945 French drama film directed by André Berthomieu based on a novel by Pierre Nord.

It was known in France as Peloton d'exécution.

It was one of the most popular films of the year in France with admissions of 3,072,622.
