= Six Hours to Lose =

- Directed by: Alex Joffé; Jean Lévitte
- Written by: Alex Joffé; Jean Lévitte
- Starring: André Luguet; Denise Grey; Pierre Larquey
- Cinematography: Pierre Montazel
- Edited by: Madeleine Gug; Denise Baby
- Music by: Henri Dutilleux
- Production company: Distributors Pathé Consortium Cinéma
- Distributed by: Pathé Consortium Cinéma
- Release date: 22 January 1947
- Running time: 90 minutes
- Country: France
- Language: French

Six Hours to Lose (French: Six heures à perdre) is a 1947 French romance film directed by Alex Joffé and Jean Lévitte and starring André Luguet, Denise Grey and Pierre Larquey. The film has no relation to the eponymous novel of Robert Brasillach, edited posthumously in 1953.

The film's sets were designed by the art director Paul-Louis Boutié and Guy de Gastyne.

== Plot ==
A traveller is stuck in an unknown town because his connecting train will only arrive in six hours. He decides to kill time by taking a stroll. He is not prepared to get confused with somebody else. In fact the citizens are eagerly awaiting the visit of a famous man and the clueless traveller is his doppelgänger. Soon he experiences what that means.

== Cast ==
- André Luguet as traveller / Léopold de Witt
- Denise Grey as Misses de Witt
- Pierre Larquey as Joseph
- Paulette Dubost as Annette
- Jacqueline Pierreux as Simone
- Dany Robin as Rosy
- Louis de Funès as the driver
- Luce Fabiole as the passenger
- Marguerite de Morlaye as the rich widow
- Jean-Jacques Delbo as Claude
- Jean Gaven as Antoine
