= Michèle Philippe =

French actress

- Born: 17 January 1926; Paris, France
- Died: 23 September 1972 (aged 46); Paris, France
- Occupation: Actress
- Years active: 1945-1959

Michèle Philippe (17 January 1926 – 23 September 1972) was a French actress. She appeared in more than twenty films from 1945 to 1959.

== Selected filmography ==
Year	Title	Role	Notes
1956	The Babes in the Secret Service		
1954	The Babes Make the Law		
1954	French Cancan		
1954	Scènes de ménage		
1953	His Father's Portrait	Marie	
1953	Wonderful Mentality	Solange	
1952	The Dream of Zorro		
1951	The Adventures of Mandrin		
1949	Le Cœur sur la main		
1948	The Firemen's Ball		
1947	The Great Maguet		
1945	The Black Cavalier		
1945	Blondine		
