= André Berthomieu =

French screenwriter and film director

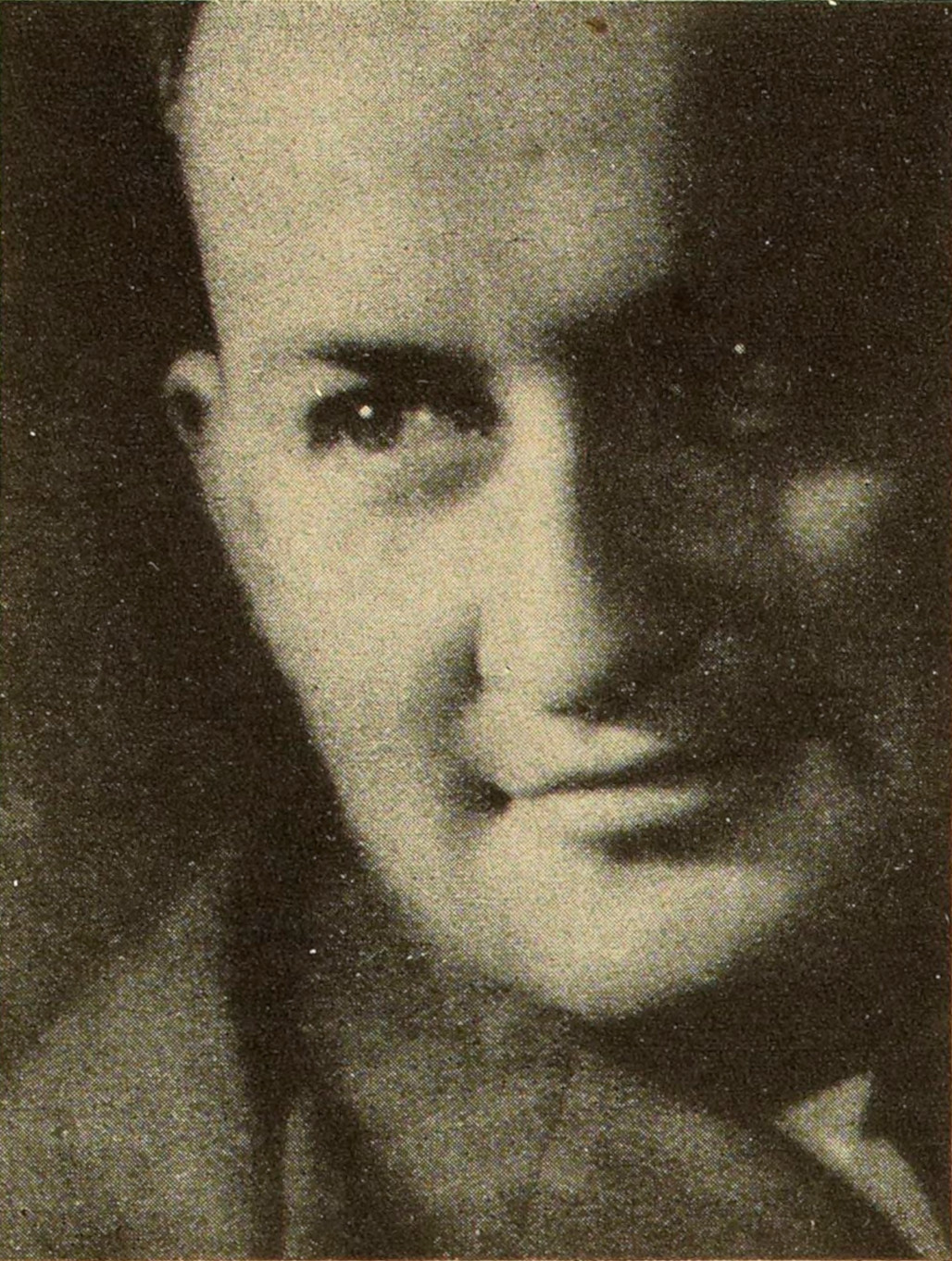
- Berthomieu in 1935.
- Born: 16 February 1903; Rouen, Seine-Inférieure, France
- Died: 10 April 1960 (aged 57); Vineuil-Saint-Firmin, Oise, France
- Occupations: Film director, Screenwriter
- Years active: 1927–1960 (film)

André Berthomieu (French pronunciation: [ɑ̃dʁe bɛʁtɔmjø]; 16 February 1903 – 10 April 1960) was a French screenwriter and film director. He was married to the actress Line Noro.

== Selected filmography ==
Director

- Not So Stupid (1928)
- The Crime of Sylvestre Bonnard (1929)
- The Ladies in the Green Hats (1929)
- My Friend Victor (1931)
- Make a Living (1931)
- Coquecigrole (1931)
- The Crime of Bouif (1933)
- Broken Wings (1933)
- Mademoiselle Josette, My Woman (1933)
- The Ideal Woman (1934)
- The Secret of Polichinelle (1936)
- The Flame (1936)
- The Lover of Madame Vidal (1936)
- Death on the Run (1936)
- Chaste Susanne (1937)
- The Girl in the Taxi (1937)
- The Train for Venice (1938)
- The New Rich (1938)
- The Woman of Monte Carlo (1938)
- Deputy Eusèbe (1939)
- The Crossroads (1942)
- Promise to a Stranger (1942)
- The Snow on the Footsteps (1942)
- The Angel of the Night (1944)
- Resistance (1945)
- My First Love (1945)
- Not So Stupid (1946)
- Gringalet (1946)
- Four Knaves (1947)
- Loves, Delights and Organs (1947)
- The Heart on the Sleeve (1948)
- White as Snow (1948)
- The Shadow (1948)
- The Firemen's Ball (1948)
- The Nude Woman (1949)
- The Chocolate Girl (1950)
- King Pandora (1950)
- Mademoiselle Josette, My Woman (1950)
- The King of Camelots (1951)
- Never Two Without Three (1951)
- His Father's Portrait (1953)
- Wonderful Mentality (1953)
- The Last Robin Hood (1953)
- Scènes de ménage (1954)
- The Duratons (1955)
- Four Days in Paris (1955)
- Love in Jamaica (1957)
- Préméditation (1960)
