= List of French films of 1936 =

French films released in 1936

A list of films produced in France in 1936:

== A-L ==
Title	Director	Cast	Genre	Notes
27 Rue de la Paix	Richard Pottier	Renée Saint-Cyr, Suzy Prim, Jules Berry	Crime	
Adventure in Paris	Marc Allégret	Jules Berry, Danièle Parola, Arletty	Comedy	
Anne-Marie	Raymond Bernard	Annabella, Pierre Richard-Willm, Pierre Labry	Drama	
The Assault	Pierre-Jean Ducis	Charles Vanel, Alice Field, Madeleine Robinson	Drama	
Bach the Detective	René Pujol	Bach, Ginette Leclerc, Jacques Dumesnil	Comedy	
The Blue Mouse	Pierre-Jean Ducis	Henri Garat, Félix Oudart, Jeanne Aubert	Comedy	UFA
The Bureaucrats	Yves Mirande	Lucien Baroux, Pierre Larquey, Josette Day	Comedy	
The Brighton Twins	Claude Heymann	Raimu, Michel Simon, Suzy Prim	Comedy	
The Call of Silence	Léon Poirier	Jean Yonnel, Jacqueline Francell, Suzanne Bianchetti	Drama	
César	Marcel Pagnol	Pierre Fresnay, Raimu, Orane Demazis	Drama	
Charley's Aunt	Pierre Colombier	Lucien Baroux, Monique Rolland, Julien Carette	Comedy	
Compliments of Mister Flow	Robert Siodmak	Fernand Gravey, Edwige Feuillère, Louis Jouvet	Mystery	
Confessions of a Cheat	Sacha Guitry	Marguerite Moreno, Jacqueline Delubac, Sacha Guitry	Comedy	
Counsel for Romance	Jean Boyer, Raoul Ploquin	Danielle Darrieux, Henri Garat, André Alerme	Romantic comedy	UFA
The Crime of Monsieur Lange	Jean Renoir	René Lefèvre, Jules Berry, Florelle	Crime drama	
Death on the Run	André Berthomieu	Jules Berry, Michel Simon, Marie Glory	Comedy	
Disk 413	Richard Pottier	Gitta Alpár, Constant Rémy, Jules Berry	Spy	
Donogoo	Henri Chomette, Reinhold Schünzel	Renée Saint-Cyr, Raymond Rouleau, Marcel Simon	Comedy	UFA
The Dying Land	Jean Vallée	Pierre Larquey, Simone Bourday, Mady Berry	Drama	
Excursion Train	Léo Joannon	Frédéric Duvallès, Germaine Roger, José Noguero	Comedy	
The Flame	André Berthomieu	Line Noro, Charles Vanel, Josette Day	Drama	
Forty Little Mothers	Léonide Moguy	Lucien Baroux, Gabrielle Dorziat, Madeleine Robinson	Comedy	
The Gardens of Murcia	Marcel Gras, Max Joly	Geymond Vital, Mona Dol	Drama	
The Great Refrain	Yves Mirande, Robert Siodmak	Fernand Gravey, Jacqueline Francell, Jeanne Aubert	Comedy drama	
The Happy Road	Georges Lacombe, Jacques Houssin	Edwige Feuillère, Claude Dauphin, Charlotte Clasis	Comedy	
The Heart Disposes	Georges Lacombe	Renée Saint-Cyr, Raymond Rouleau, Marguerite Templey	Comedy	
Helene	Jean Benoît-Lévy	Madeleine Renaud, Constant Rémy	Drama	
A Hen on a Wall	Maurice Gleize	Jules Berry, Pierre Larquey	Crime	
In the Service of the Tsar	Pierre Billon	Pierre Richard-Willm, Véra Korène, Suzy Prim	Drama	
Inspector Grey	Maurice de Canonge	Maurice Lagrenée, Jean Brochard, Alexandre Mihalesco	Crime	
Jacques and Jacotte	Robert Péguy	Roger Tréville, Germaine Roger	Comedy	
Jenny	Marcel Carné	Françoise Rosay, Albert Préjean	Drama	
La Vie parisienne	Robert Siodmak	Max Dearly, Tyrell Davis	Musical	French-language
La Garçonne	Jean de Limur	Marie Bell, Arletty	Drama	
Girls of Paris	Claude Vermorel	Michel Simon, Mireille Balin	Comedy	
Le Golem	Julien Duvivier	Harry Baur, Roger Karl	Horror	
The King	Pierre Colombier	Victor Francen, Raimu, Gaby Morlay	Comedy	
A Legionnaire	Christian-Jaque	Fernandel, Robert Le Vigan	Adventure	
Let's Make a Dream	Sacha Guitry	Sacha Guitry, Raimu, Jacqueline Delubac, Arletty	Comedy	Tobis
The Lower Depths	Jean Renoir	Jean Gabin, Junie Astor, Louis Jouvet	Drama	1 win
The Lover of Madame Vidal	André Berthomieu	Elvire Popesco, Victor Boucher	Comedy	

== M-Z ==
Title	Director	Cast	Genre	Notes
Maria of the Night	Willy Rozier	Gina Manès, Paul Bernard, Monique Rolland	Drama	
Marinella	Pierre Caron	Tino Rossi, Yvette Lebon, Jeanne Fusier-Gir	Comedy	
The Marriages of Mademoiselle Levy	André Hugon	Yvette Lebon, Charles Lamy, Pierre Mingand	Comedy	
Martha	Karl Anton	Huguette Duflos, Sim Viva, Roger Bourdin	Musical	Tobis
Mayerling	Anatole Litvak	Charles Boyer, Danielle Darrieux	Historical love-drama	1 win & 1 nomination
Ménilmontant	René Guissart	Gabriel Signoret, Pierre Larquey, Josette Day	Comedy drama	
Mercadet	André Hugon	Philippe Janvier, Alexandre Mihalesco, Elmire Vautier	Comedy	
Michel Strogoff	Jacques de Baroncelli	Anton Walbrook, Colette Darfeuil, Charles Vanel	Historical	Tobis
Monsieur Personne	Christian-Jaque	Jules Berry, Josseline Gaël, André Berley	Mystery	
Moutonnet	René Sti	Michel Simon, Janine Crispin, Suzy Prim	Comedy	
The Mutiny of the Elsinore	Pierre Chenal	Jean Murat, André Berley, Maurice Lagrenée	Adventure	
The Mysterious Lady	Robert Péguy	Fernand Mailly, Gina Manès, Simone Renant	Drama	
The New Men	Marcel L'Herbier	Harry Baur, Natalie Paley, Gabriel Signoret	Drama	
The New Testament	Sacha Guitry	Sacha Guitry, Jacqueline Delubac, Christian Gérard	Comedy	Tobis
Nitchevo	Jacques de Baroncelli	Harry Baur, Marcelle Chantal	Drama	
On the Road	Jean Boyer	Jacques Pills, Claude May	Musical	UFA
Parisian Life	Robert Siodmak	Max Dearly, Tyrell Davis	Musical	English-language
Partie de campagne	Jean Renoir	Sylvia Bataille, Georges D'Arnoux	Comedy drama	Short film
La Peur	Viktor Tourjansky	Gaby Morlay, Charles Vanel	Drama	
The Phantom Gondola	Augusto Genina	Marcelle Chantal, Henri Rollan	Drama	Co-production with Italy
Port Arthur	Nicolas Farkas	Anton Walbrook, Danielle Darrieux, Charles Vanel	Drama	Co-production with Germany
Prince of the Six Days	Robert Vernay	Adrien Lamy, René Ferté, Paulette Dubost	Sports comedy	
Rigolboche	Christian-Jaque	André Lefaur, Jules Berry	Historical musical	
Rose	Raymond Rouleau	Jean Servais, Lisette Lanvin, Henri Guisol	Comedy	
Royal Waltz	Jean Grémillon	Henri Garat, Renée Saint-Cyr	Historical	UFA
Samson	Maurice Tourneur	Harry Baur, Gaby Morlay	Drama	
School for Journalists	Christian-Jaque	Armand Bernard, Colette Darfeuil, Simone Renant	Comedy	
The Secret of Polichinelle	André Berthomieu	Raimu, Françoise Rosay	Comedy	
Seven Men, One Woman	Yves Mirande	Fernand Gravey, Véra Korène	Romantic comedy	
Taras Bulba	Alexis Granowsky	Harry Baur, Jean-Pierre Aumont, Danielle Darrieux	Historical	
Temptation	Pierre Caron	Marie Bell, Antonin Berval, Gina Manès	Drama	
The Tender Enemy	Max Ophüls	Simone Berriau, Catherine Fonteney	Comedy	
The Terrible Lovers	Marc Allégret	Gaby Morlay, André Luguet	Comedy	
They Were Five	Julien Duvivier	Jean Gabin, Charles Vanel	Drama	
Three Days Leave	Maurice Kéroul, Georges Monca	Alice Tissot, André Berley, Dolly Davis	Comedy	
Topaze	Marcel Pagnol	Alexandre Arnaudy, Sylvia Bataille	Comedy	
The Two Boys	Fernand Rivers	Germaine Rouer, Annie Ducaux	Drama	
The Two Girls	Maurice Champreux, René Hervil	Abel Tarride, Jacqueline Daix	Drama	
Under Western Eyes	Marc Allégret	Pierre Fresnay, Danièle Parola	Drama	
The Volga Boatman	Vladimir Strizhevsky	Pierre Blanchar, Véra Korène, Charles Vanel	Drama	
When Midnight Strikes	Léo Joannon	Marie Bell, Pierre Renoir, Thomy Bourdelle	Crime	
With a Smile	Maurice Tourneur	Maurice Chevalier, André Lefaur	Comedy	
Wolves Between Them	Léon Mathot	Roger Duchesne, Jules Berry, Renée Saint-Cyr	Spy thriller	
Women's Club	Jacques Deval	Danielle Darrieux, Josette Day	Comedy	
You Are Me	René Guissart	Jacques Pills, Claude May	Musical	
You Can't Fool Antoinette	Paul Madeux	Armand Bernard, Simone Renant, Paul Pauley	Comedy	

== See also ==
- 1936 in France
