= Le Roi des resquilleurs =

1930 film

Le Roi des resquilleurs is a French film directed by Pierre Colombier, released in 1930. It was distributed in the US as The King of the Gate Crashers.

== Details ==
- Title : Le Roi des resquilleurs
- Rirector: Pierre Colombier
- Writer: Pierre Colombier and René Pujol
- Dialogue: René Pujol
- Decoration: Jacques Colombier
- Image: Henri Barreyre and Fédote Bourgassoff
- Sound: Carl S. Livermann
- Music: Ralph Erwin and Kazimierz Oberfeld
- Producer: Bernard Natan, Émile Natan
- Production company: Pathé-Natan
- Release date: France: 14 November 1930

== Starring ==
- Georges Milton : Eugène "Bouboule" Leroy
- Hélène Perdrière : Lulu
- Hélène Robert : Arlette
- Pierre Nay : René Francis
- Henri Kerny : The controller
- Mady Berry : Mme Francis
- Jean Garat : Sycleton
- Jean Bérétrot : The speaker
- Jim Prat : The judge
- Léon Bernstein : The referee
- Georgette Anys
- Louise Dauville
- Henri Desmarets : The director of the Vel' d'Hiv'
- Henri Farty
- Laure Jarny
- Nicolas Redelsperger : the selector

== The film ==
The film is the first of a series of films containing the character of "Bouboule", created by the singer Milton and comprising La Bande à Bouboule (1931), directed by Léon Mathot, Le Roi du cirage (1931), directed by Pierre Colombier, Bouboule Ier, roi des Nègres (1933), directed by Léon Mathot, and Prince Bouboule, directed by Jacques Houssin (1939).

== Remake ==
A remake was released in 1945, starring Jean Devaivre and Rellys.

It was one of the most popular movies in France in 1945 with admissions of 3,679,438.
