= Christian Chamborant =

French film director

- Born: Eugène Christian Chamborant; 4 June 1892; Paris
- Died: 10 December 1948 (aged 56); Paris

Eugène Christian Chamborant (4 June 1892 – 10 December 1948) was a French film director.

== Biography ==
Little is known about the life of this discreet filmmaker who died a week before the release of his final movie. Before becoming a director, he was the author of numerous documentaries during the 1920s and 1930s. Among other things, he worked for the producer Pierre Caron from 1936.

== Filmography ==
=== Film editor ===
- 1936: Les Demi-vierges, de Pierre Caron
- 1936: Marinella, by Pierre Caron
- 1937: The Club of Aristocrats, by Pierre Colombier
- 1937: Balthazar, by Pierre Colombier

=== Production manager ===
- 1938: Le Dompteur by Pierre Colombier
- 1946: Son of France, by Pierre Blondy

=== Assistant director ===
- 1938: Mon curé chez les riches, by Jean Boyer
- 1939: Cocoanut, by Jean Boyer
- 1939: Circonstances atténuantes, by Jean Boyer
- 1939: Nine Bachelors, by Sacha Guitry
- 1939: Serenade, by Jean Boyer
- 1940: Miquette, by Jean Boyer

=== Director ===
- 1937: Police mondaine, with Michel Bernheim
- 1939: Latin Quarter, with Pierre Colombier and Alexander Esway
- 1941: Patrouille blanche
- 1942: White Patrol
- 1947: Rouletabille joue et gagne
- 1948: Rouletabille contre la dame de pique

== Bibliography ==
- Tulard, Jean (1982). Les Réalisateurs. Vol. 1. Robert Laffont. ISBN 2-221-08189-7.

=== External links ===
- Christian Chamborant at IMDb
