= Jeanne Juilla =

French model and actress (1910–1996)

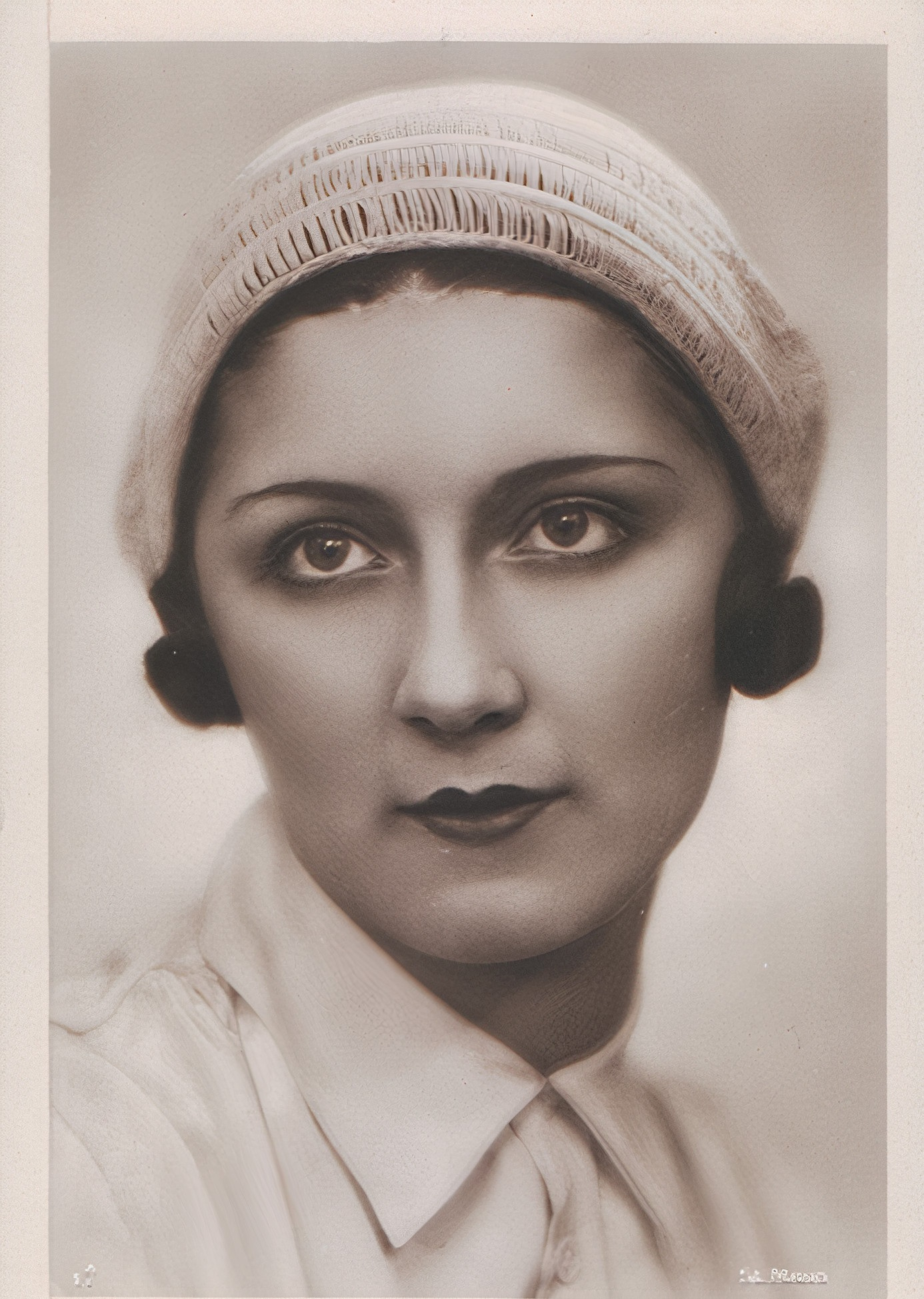
- Jeanne Juilla in 1931
- Born: 21 August 1910; Villeneuve-sur-Lot, France
- Died: 4 September 1996 (aged 86); Saint-Aubin-lès-Elbeuf, Normandy, France
- Other names: Jannet Julia, Janot Jullia, Janette Julia, Jane Julian, Jeanne Juillia, Jeanne Jullia
- Occupations: Model, actress
- Title: Miss Europe 1931
- Mother: Marie Zoé Lautard

Jeanne Marie Justine Juilla (French pronunciation: [ʒan maʁi ʒystin ʒɥija]; 21 August 1910 – 4 September 1996) was a French model and actress, who became the seventh Miss France and the first Frenchwoman to earn the Miss Europe title.

== Life ==
Juilla was born on 21 August 1910 in Villeneuve-sur-Lot, France to Louis Jean Juilla and Marie Zoé Lautard, who was a seamstress. Her widowed mother raised Juilla alone. In May 1930, she was elected as Miss Gascony, the title that qualified her for the selection of Miss France 1931. She won Miss France 1931 title, making herself the seventh to do so. The beauty contest was organized by the Parisian Committee created by a Belgian born French journalist, Maurice de Waleffe in 1920, and was juried from among 150 candidates gathered in the village hall of the Le Journal in Paris.

My greatest ambition is to make my mother happy. I will not go on the stage or screen. Just a few weeks ago I saw a large city for the first time—Paris!

— Jeanne Marie Justine Juilla

On 5 February 1931, at the age of 20, Jeanne Juilla became the first Frenchwomen to be elected as Miss Europe. The contest was held in the same Persian premises as for the contest of Miss France 1931. Juilla was selected as Miss Europe among the participants of 16 different European countries. The jury of the selection was chaired by French painter Paul Chabas. Jeanne Juilla died on 4 September 1996, aged 86, in Saint-Aubin-les-Elbeuf, Seine-Maritime.

== Filmography ==
=== As Jeanne Juilla ===
- 1932 - Sa meilleure cliente by Pierre Colombier
- 1936 - Samson by Maurice Tourneur (with Simone Barillier, Miss France 1934)

=== As Janot Jullia ===
- 1933 - Miss Helyett by Jean Kemm and Hubert Bourlon

=== As Jane Jullian ===
- 1934 - La Prison de Saint-Clothaire by Pierre-Jean Ducis
- 1934 - Une femme chipée by Pierre Colombier

== Photos ==
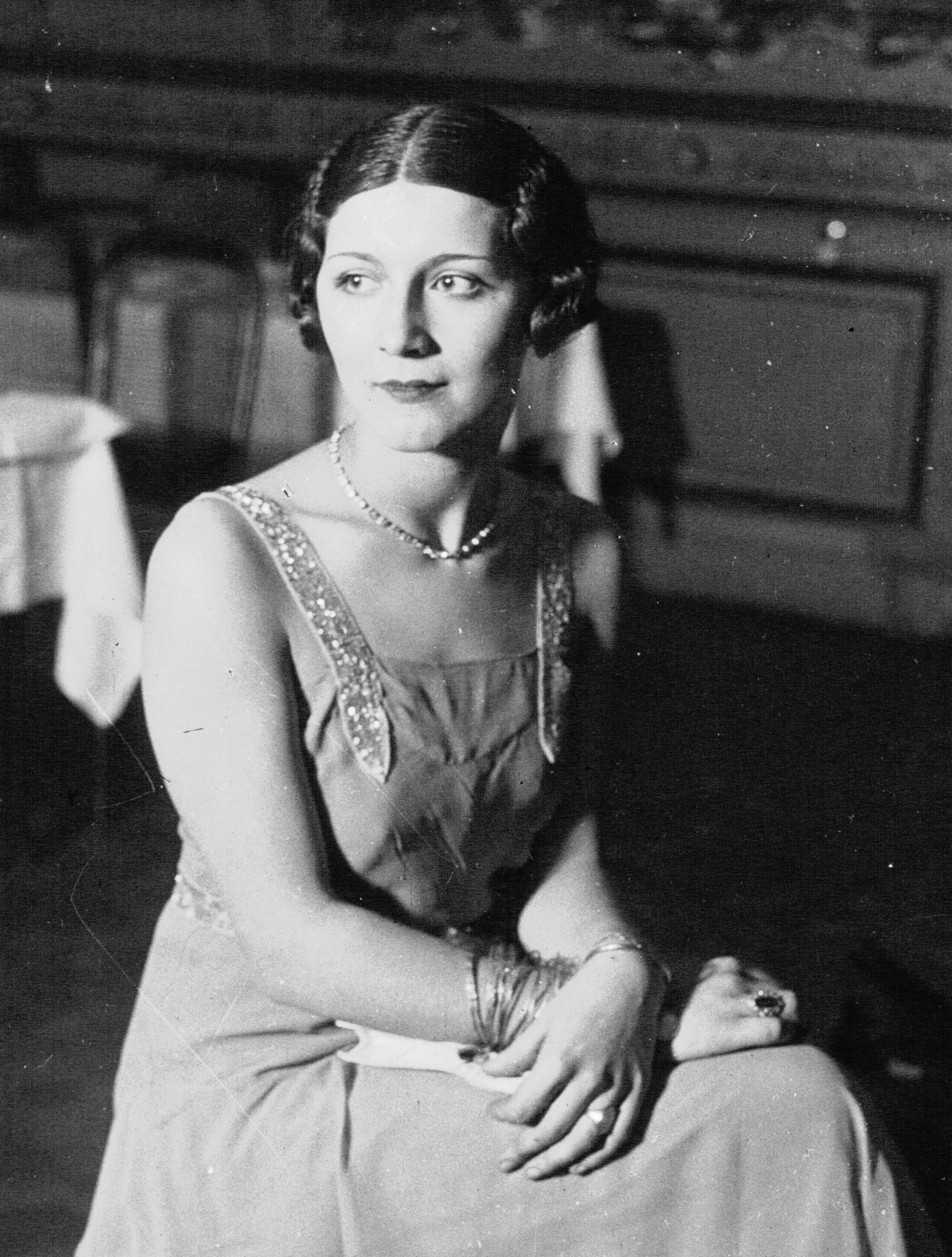
