= Paris Camargue =

1935 film

- Directed by: Jack Forrester
- Written by: Claude Privault; René Pujol
- Produced by: André Parant
- Starring: Max Dearly; Albert Préjean; Monique Rolland
- Music by: Charles Tucker
- Production company: Forrester-Parant Productions
- Distributed by: Forrester-Parant Productions
- Release date: 6 September 1935
- Running time: 80 minutes
- Country: France
- Language: French

Paris Camargue is a 1935 French comedy film directed by Jack Forrester and starring Max Dearly, Albert Préjean and Monique Rolland. Location shooting took place in the Camargue in Southern France.

== Synopsis ==
The wealthy Jules Fabrejoul, who owns a large estate in the Camargue, squanders much of it on his mistress an actress from Paris. Meanwhile, his niece is having trouble with her fiancée who she mistakenly believes has been unfaithful to her.

== Cast ==
- Max Dearly as Jules Fabrejoul
- Albert Préjean as Gérard Davilliers
- Monique Rolland as Monique
- Simone Cerdan as Martine
- Julien Carette as Escanette
- Ginette Leclerc as Margot - une pensionnaire
- Marguerite Pierry as La tante Fabrejoul
- Pierre Stéphen as L'ami de Gérard
- Simone Badler
- René Baranger
- Luce Fabiole
- Pierre Finaly
- Anthony Gildès
- Paule Launay

== Bibliography ==
- Bessy, Maurice & Chirat, Raymond. Histoire du cinéma français: 1935-1939. Pygmalion, 1986.
- Crisp, Colin. Genre, Myth and Convention in the French Cinema, 1929-1939. Indiana University Press, 2002.
- Rège, Philippe. Encyclopedia of French Film Directors, Volume 1. Scarecrow Press, 2009.
