= Toto (1933 film) =

1933 film

- Directed by: Jacques Tourneur
- Written by: Curt Alexander; Henry Koster; René Pujol
- Produced by: Bernard Natan; Emile Natan
- Starring: Albert Préjean; Renée Saint-Cyr; Félix Oudart
- Cinematography: Raymond Agnel; René Colas
- Music by: Jane Bos
- Production company: Pathé-Natan
- Distributed by: Pathé-Natan
- Release date: 1 September 1933
- Running time: 80 minutes
- Country: France
- Language: French

Toto is a 1933 French comedy film directed by Jacques Tourneur and starring Albert Préjean, Renée Saint-Cyr and Félix Oudart. It was shot at Pathé's Joinville Studios in Paris. The film's sets were designed by the art director Jacques Colombier.

== Cast ==
- Albert Préjean as Toto
- Renée Saint-Cyr as Ginette
- Robert Goupil as Carotte
- Félix Oudart as L'agent
- Jim Gérald as Bruno
- Mercédès Brare as Concurente Miss Occasion
- Gabrielle Fontan as La logeuse
- Édouard Francomme as Un prisonnier
- Anthony Gildès as Le président du jury
- Pierre Juvenet as Le présentateur du concours
- Ginette Leclerc as La petite femme

== Bibliography ==
- Oscherwitz, Dayna & Higgins, MaryEllen. The A to Z of French Cinema. Scarecrow Press, 2009.
