= Tricoche and Cacolet =

1938 French film

- Directed by: Pierre Colombier
- Written by: Ludovic Halevy (play); Henri Meilhac (play); René Pujol
- Produced by: Bernard Natan; Emile Natan; Joseph Spigler
- Starring: Fernandel; Frédéric Duvallès; Ginette Leclerc
- Cinematography: Armand Thirard
- Edited by: Jean Pouzet
- Music by: Casimir Oberfeld
- Production company: Les Films Modernes
- Distributed by: Les Distributeurs Associés
- Release date: 7 September 1938
- Running time: 107 minutes
- Country: France
- Language: French

Tricoche and Cacolet (French: Tricoche et Cacolet) is a 1938 French comedy film directed by Pierre Colombier and starring Fernandel, Frédéric Duvallès and Ginette Leclerc. It is based on an 1872 play of the same title by Ludovic Halevy and Henri Meilhac. It was shot at the Saint-Maurice Studios in Paris. The film's sets were designed by the art director Jacques Colombier.

== Synopsis ==
Two idle Parisian boulevardiers set up a detective agency. They are separately hired by a husband and wife to spy on each other with their respective lovers, while a Turkish Prince has fallen in love with both the wife and her husband's mistress. Eventually everything is resolved to everyone's satisfaction.

== Cast ==
- Fernandel as Tricoche
- Frédéric Duvallès as Cacolet
- Ginette Leclerc as Fanny de Saint-Origan dite Fanny Bombance
- Elvire Popesco as Bernardine Van der Pouf
- Saturnin Fabre as Monsieur Van der Pouf
- Monique Montey as Georgette
- Palmyre Levasseur as La bonne de Tricoche
- Madeleine Suffel as Virginie – la bonne du bureau de placement
- Jean Weber as Le duc Émile
- Sylvio De Pedrelli as Oscar Pacha
- Jean Gobet as Breloque – le secrétaire
- Gaston Orbal as Fil-de-fer
- Rivers Cadet as Naphtaline
- Alexandre Mihalesco as Le régisseur
- Albert Malbert as L'acteur
- Simone Chobillon
- Manuel Gary
- Franck Maurice
- Fernand Trignol

== Bibliography ==
- Jean-Louis Ginibre, John Lithgow & Barbara Cady. Ladies Or Gentlemen: A Pictorial History of Male Cross-dressing in the Movies. Filipacchi Publishing, 2005.
