= Theodore and Company (film) =

1933 film directed by Pierre Colombier

- Directed by: Pierre Colombier
- Written by: René Pujol
- Based on: Theodore and Company by Paul Armont and Nicolas Nancey
- Produced by: Bernard Natan; Emile Natan
- Starring: Raimu; Albert Préjean; Alice Field
- Cinematography: Victor Arménise; Henri Barreyre
- Edited by: Léonide Moguy
- Music by: Jacques Belasco; Jane Bos
- Production company: Pathé-Natan
- Distributed by: Pathé-Natan
- Release date: 1 April 1933
- Running time: 97 minutes
- Country: France
- Language: French

Theodore and Company (French: Théodore et Cie) is a 1933 French comedy film directed by Pierre Colombier and starring Raimu, Albert Préjean and Alice Field. It is based on the 1909 play of the same title by Paul Armont and Nicolas Nancey. It was shot at the Joinville Studios of Pathé-Natan in Paris. The film's sets were designed by the art director Jacques Colombier.

== Synopsis ==
Chénerol is a wealthy cheesemaker who becomes convinced his wife is cheating on him. His lazy nephew Théodore and his friend Clodomir try to convince his otherwise.

== Cast ==
- Raimu as Clodomir
- Albert Préjean as Théodore
- Alice Field as Gaby / Adrienne
- Pierre Alcover as L'oncle Chénerol
- Charles Redgie as Malvoisier
- Félix Oudart as Le sénateur
- Georges Morton as Le barman
- Germaine Auger as Loulou

== Bibliography ==
- Crisp, Colin. Genre, Myth and Convention in the French Cinema, 1929-1939. Indiana University Press, 2002.
- Goble, Alan. The Complete Index to Literary Sources in Film. Walter de Gruyter, 1999.
- Rège, Philippe. Encyclopedia of French Film Directors, Volume 1. Scarecrow Press, 2009.
