= Eugène Frouhins =

French actor (1888–1966)

- Born: 9 May 1888; Estang, Gers, France
- Died: 29 May 1966 (aged 78); Paris, France
- Other name: Eugène Frouin
- Occupation: Actor
- Years active: 1935–1953 (film)

Eugène Frouhins (9 May 1888 – 29 May 1966) was a French stage and film actor.

== Selected filmography ==
- Fanfare of Love (1935)
- Sing Anyway (1940)
- Annette and the Blonde Woman (1942)
- Eight Men in a Castle (1942)
- Fever (1942)
- Private Life (1942)
- Devil and the Angel (1946)
- My Friend Sainfoin (1950)
- The Voyage to America (1951)

== Bibliography ==
- Maurice Bessy, André Bernard & Raymond Chirat. Histoire du cinéma français: 1951-1955. Pygmalion, 1989.
