= Sapho (1934 film) =

- Directed by: Léonce Perret
- Written by: Léonce Perret; Adolphe Belot
- Based on: Sappho by Alphonse Daudet
- Starring: Mary Marquet; Jean-Max; Marcelle Praince
- Cinematography: Victor Arménise; Robert Lefebvre
- Music by: Reynaldo Hahn
- Production company: Pathé-Natan
- Distributed by: Pathé Consortium Cinéma
- Release date: 7 April 1934
- Country: France
- Language: French

Sapho is a 1934 French drama film directed by Léonce Perret and starring Mary Marquet, Jean-Max and Marcelle Praince.

The film's sets were designed by the art director Jacques Colombier.

== Cast ==
- Mary Marquet as Fanny Legrand
- Jean-Max as Dechelette
- Marcelle Praince as Rosa
- François Rozet as Jean Gaussin
- Camille Bert as Caoudal
- Madame Ahnar as Pilar
- Nadia Sibirskaïa as La fille
- Marguerite Ducouret as Madame Hettema
- Jacqueline Made as Alice Doré
- Marfa d'Hervilly as Clara
- Charlotte Clasis as Divonne
- Yvonne Mirval as Wilkie Cab
- Germaine Montero as Madame Sombreuse
- Lucien Brulé as De Potter
- Jean Bara as Le petit Joseph
- Fernand Charpin as Césaire
- Georges Morton as Le père Legrand
- Marcel Carpentier as Monsieur Hettema
- André Perchicot as Paulus
- Ky Duyen as Le domestique

== Bibliography ==
- Goble, Alan. The Complete Index to Literary Sources in Film. Walter de Gruyter, 1999.
