= The Club of Aristocrats =

1937 film directed by Pierre Colombier

- Directed by: Pierre Colombier
- Written by: Roger d'Ashelbé (novel); Jean-Pierre Feydeau; Jean Guitton
- Produced by: Claude Dolbert
- Starring: Jules Berry; Elvire Popesco; André Lefaur
- Cinematography: Victor Arménise
- Edited by: Christian Chamborant
- Music by: Jane Bos
- Production company: Productions Claude Dolbert
- Distributed by: R.A.I. Films
- Release date: 2 September 1937
- Running time: 89 minutes
- Country: France
- Language: French

The Club of Aristocrats (French: Le club des aristocrates) is a 1937 French comedy film directed by Pierre Colombier and starring Jules Berry, Elvire Popesco and André Lefaur. The film's sets were designed by the art director Jacques Colombier.

== Cast ==
- Jules Berry as Serge de Montbreuse
- Elvire Popesco as La comtesse Irène Waldapowska
- André Lefaur as Le baron de Taillebourg
- Pierre Larquey as Miser
- Viviane Romance as Gloriane
- Fernand Charpin as Bénard
- Armand Bernard as Alfred
- Florence Walton as La marquise de Tranchemare
- Marcel Simon as Le conservateur des Musées nationaux
- André Roanne as André
- Lisette Lanvin as Evelyne
- Jean Tissier as Le secrétaire du club
- Jacques Beauvais as Le maître d'hôtel
- Marguerite de Morlaye as Une invitée
- Liliane Lesaffre as Une invitée
- Suzy Pierson
- Hélène Pépée as La soubrette
- Reda-Caire as Le chanteur
- Philippe Richard as Le marjordome
- José Sergy as Edmond

== Bibliography ==
- Parish, James Robert. Film Actors Guide: Western Europe. Scarecrow Press, 1977.
