= Robert Arnoux =

French actor (1899–1964)

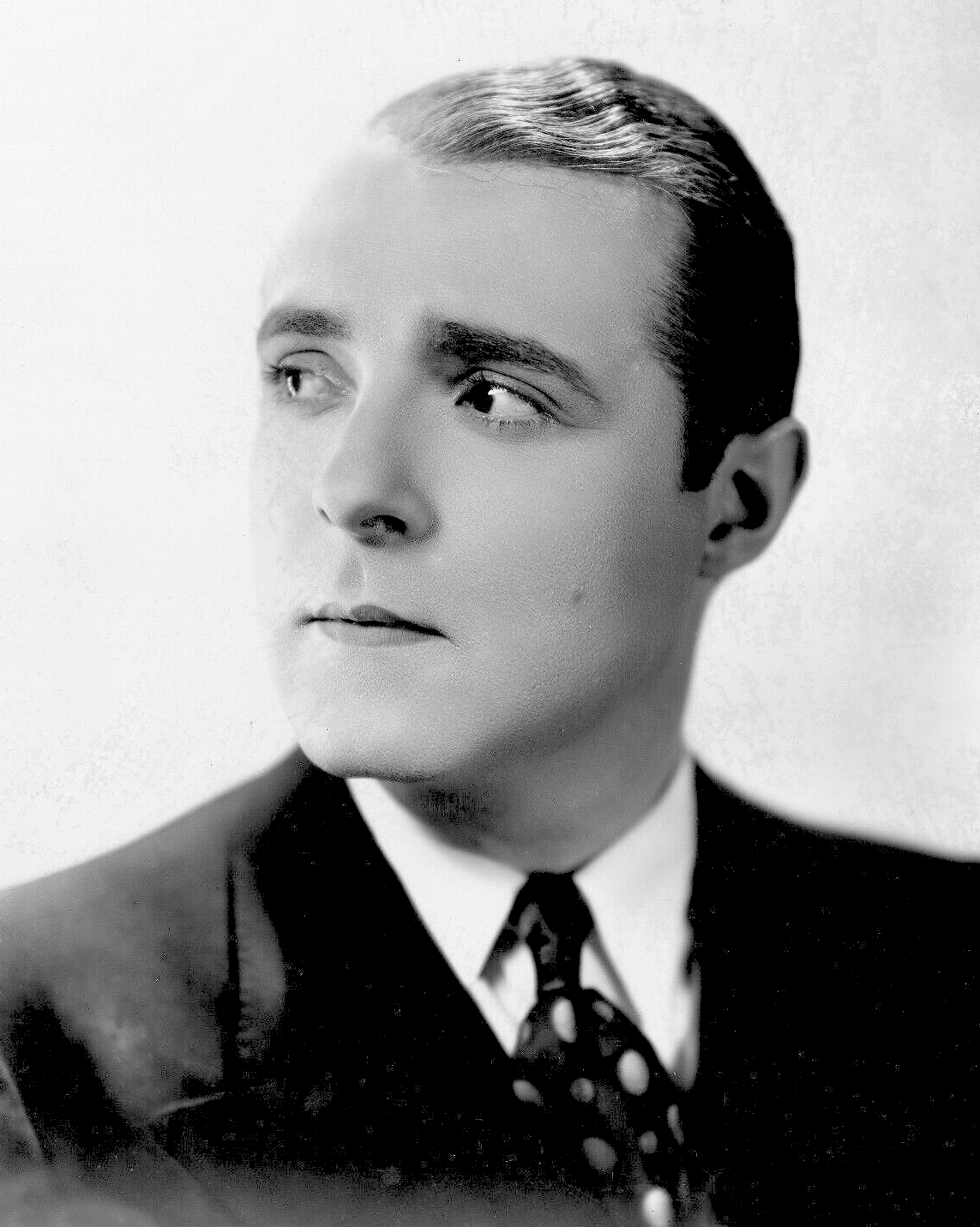
Robert Raymond Arnoux

Robert Raymond Arnoux (23 October 1899, in Lille – 13 March 1964, in Paris) was a French actor.

== Selected filmography ==
- Hantise (1922)
- Napoléon (1927) - Un conventionnel (uncredited)
- Rive gauche (1931) - Alfred
- Le congrès s'amuse (1931) - Pépi
- Tumultes (1932) - Willi
- Côte d'Azur (1932) - Anselme Duval
- La perle (1932) - Jacques Surville
- Ma femme... homme d'affaires (1962) - Pierre
- Le truc du Brésilien (1932)
- La pouponnière (1933) - Jean Moreau
- Madame ne veut pas d'enfants (1933) - Félix Le Barrois
- Je te confie ma femme (1933) - Berger
- Une femme au volant (1933) - Le baron d'Arcole
- Liliom (1934) - Le tourneur (the Lathe Turner)
- Youth (1934) - Jean
- Antonia (1935) - Pali
- Le Contrôleur des wagons-lits (1935) - Le collègue d'Albert
- Whirlpool of Desire (1935) - Pierre
- Gangster malgré lui (1935)
- Merchant of Love (1935) - Léo
- Wedding Night (1935) - Gaston
- Madame Angot's Daughter (1935) - Pomponnet - Un coiffeur
- Stradivarius (1935) - Imre Berczy
- Princess Tam-Tam (1935) - Coton
- Bourrachon (1935) - Henri Mirguet
- The Dying Land (1936) - François
- Seven Men, One Woman (1936) - Le spéculateur Vauxcouleur
- The Blue Mouse (1936) - Rigaud
- Josette (1937) - Rémy Doré
- Enfants de Paris (1937) - L'oncle
- L'appel de la vie (1937) - Marmousot
- Boulot the Aviator (1937) - Boulot
- Mademoiselle ma mère (1937) - Moreuil
- Balthazar (1937) - Boutrot
- Le plus beau gosse de France (1938)
- Visages de femmes (1939) - Saint-Ernest
- Extenuating Circumstances (1939) - Gabriel, the chauffeur
- Serenade (1940) - Chavert
- Pour le maillot jaune (1940) - Regrattier
- Chèque au porteur (1941) - Gaëtan
- Prince Charming (1942) - Ernest
- Sideral Cruises (1942) - Le banquier Antoine
- Frederica (1942) - Julien Blanchet
- Love Letters (1942) - Monsieur de la Jacquerie
- Dorothy Looks for Love (1945)
- La femme fatale (1946) - Monsieur Coussol
- We Are Not Married (1946) - Camille
- Something to Sing About (1947) - Barette
- Mirror (1947) - Leroy-Garnier
- The Revenge of Baccarat (1947) - Venture
- Rocambole (1947) - Ventura
- The Firemen's Ball (1948) - Touvoir
- Fantômas contre Fantômas (1949) - Noblet
- Between Eleven and Midnight (1949) - Rossignol
- At the Grand Balcony (1949) - Vuillemin
- Amédée (1950) - Mareuil
- The Atomic Monsieur Placido (1950) - Joe
- Women Are Crazy (1950) - Gaston
- Mademoiselle Josette, My Woman (1950) - Panard
- Beware of Blondes (1950) - Le rédacteur en chef
- The Dream of Andalusia (1951) - Schnell
- Andalusia (1951) - Schnell
- Bluebeard (1951) - Mathieu Les Grands Pieds
- The Night Is My Kingdom (1951) - Julien Latour
- Chacun son tour (1951) - Raoul
- My Priest Among the Rich (1952) - Cousinet
- Manina, the Girl in the Bikini (1952) - M. Moulon / Purzel
- Three Days of Fun in Paris (1954) - Le commissaire
- Orient Express (1954) - Jean Tribot aka Mr.Davis
- My Priest Among the Poor (1956) - Cousinet
- Deadlier Than the Male (1956) - Bouvier
- La Traversée de Paris (1956) - Marchandot
- Les lumières du soir (1956) - Angelotti
- La garçonne (1957) - Sorbier
- Une nuit aux Baléares (1957) - Loulou
- The Tricyclist (1957) - Le dirigeant
- Oh! Qué mambo (1959) - Chauvet
- Le caïd (1960) - Le directeur de la Socorep
- Bernadette de Lourdes (1961) - Docteur Douzous
- Arsène Lupin Versus Arsène Lupin (1962) - Hector Martin (uncredited)
- Seul... à corps perdu (1963) - Le rédacteur en chef
- Black Humor (1965) - (segment 1 'La Bestiole')
- Les mordus de Paris (1965) - (final film role)
