= Raymond Gabutti =

French art director

- Born: 6 April 1908; Paris, France
- Died: 6 January 1985 (aged 76); Dreux, France
- Occupation: Art director
- Years active: 1937 – 1974 (film)

Raymond Gabutti (1908–1985) was a French art director.

== Selected filmography ==
- Three Waltzes (1938)
- Durand Jewellers (1938)
- Storm Over Asia (1938)
- Crossroads (1938)
- Private Life (1942)
- Mermoz (1943)
- Children of Paradise (1945)
- The Seventh Door (1947)
- The Great Maguet (1947)
- Judicial Error (1948)
- Emile the African (1949)
- Fantomas Against Fantomas (1949)
- Thirst of Men (1950)
- Captain Ardant (1951)
- Endless Horizons (1953)
- The Lovers of Marianne (1953)
- Royal Affairs in Versailles (1954)
- I'll Get Back to Kandara (1956)
- Anyone Can Kill Me (1957)
- Life Together (1958)
- Leontine (1968)
- A Golden Widow (1969)

== Bibliography ==
- Turk, Edward Baron. Child of Paradise: Marcel Carné and the Golden Age of French Cinema. Harvard University Press, 1989.
