= Victor Arménise =

Italian cinematographer

- Born: 4 January 1896 (age 130); Bari, Apulia, Kingdom of Italy
- Occupation: Cinematographer
- Years active: 1918–1956

Victor Arménise was an Italian cinematographer. Arménise worked on over eighty feature films during his lifetime. He began his career working on Italian silent films. He later made films in several other countries including Britain and Germany but primarily in France. He worked with a number of leading directors including Raoul Walsh and Maurice Tourneur.

== Selected filmography ==
- Messalina (1924)
- Pawns of Passion (1928)
- The Story of a Little Parisian (1928)
- Dolly (1929)
- Ship in Distress (1929)
- Everybody Wins (1930)
- When Love Is Over (1931)
- Dance Hall (1931)
- His Best Client (1932)
- Orange Blossom (1932)
- Theodore and Company (1933)
- Temptation (1934)
- Sapho (1934)
- Antonia (1935)
- Variety (1935)
- Koenigsmark (1935)
- Accused (1936)
- Samson (1936)
- Crime Over London (1936)
- The Club of Aristocrats (1937)
- The Kings of Sport (1937)
- Jump for Glory (1937)
- Mother Love (1938)
- Monsieur Coccinelle (1938)
- My Priest Among the Rich (1938)
- Behind the Facade (1939)
- Nine Bachelors (1939)
- Extenuating Circumstances (1939)
- They Were Twelve Women (1940)
- Narcisse (1940)
- The Acrobat (1941)
- Prince Charming (1942)
- Bolero (1942)
- Monsieur La Souris (1942)
- The Lover of Borneo (1942)
- Romance for Three (1942)
- Arlette and Love (1943)
- St. Val's Mystery (1945)
- Father Goriot (1945)
- The Captain (1946)
- The Three Cousins (1947)
- The Great Maguet (1947)
- The Sinners (1949)
- Blonde (1950)
- My Priest Among the Rich (1952)
- Double or Quits (1953)
- The Porter from Maxim's (1953)
- The Duratons (1955)
- Baratin (1956)

== Bibliography ==
- Moss, Marilyn Ann. Raoul Walsh: The True Adventures of Hollywood's Legendary Director. University Press of Kentucky, 2011.
