= Jacques Colombier (art director) =

French art director (1901–1988)

- Born: 1901; Compiegne, Picardy, France
- Died: 12 February 1988 (aged 86–87); Paris, France
- Occupation: Art director
- Years active: 1925–1965 (film)

Jacques Colombier (1901–1988) was a French art director who designed the sets for many films during his career.

== Selected filmography ==
- Dolly (1929)
- Everybody Wins (1930)
- My Childish Father (1930)
- Departure (1931)
- Headfirst into Happiness (1931)
- The Foreigner (1931)
- The Malay Dagger (1931)
- Montmartre (1931)
- Beauty Spot (1932)
- His Best Client (1932)
- The Heir of the Bal Tabarin (1933)
- Toto (1933)
- Theodore and Company (1933)
- Temptation (1934)
- Sapho (1934)
- The Midnight Prince (1934)
- School for Coquettes (1935)
- Antonia (1935)
- The King (1936)
- Charley's Aunt (1936)
- The Life and Loves of Beethoven (1936)
- Wolves Between Them (1936)
- Parisian Life (1936)
- The Club of Aristocrats (1937)
- Balthazar (1937)
- A Man to Kill (1937)
- The Kings of Sport (1937)
- Beethoven's Great Love (1937)
- Ignace (1937)
- The New Rich (1938)
- The Tamer (1938)
- My Priest Among the Rich (1938)
- Tricoche and Cacolet (1938)
- The Woman Thief (1938)
- Mother Love (1938)
- The Fatted Calf (1939)
- Nine Bachelors (1939)
- Extenuating Circumstances (1939)
- Prince Charming (1942)
- The Lover of Borneo (1942)
- Happy Go Lucky (1946)
- Christine Gets Married (1946)
- The Revenge of Roger (1946)
- City of Hope (1948)
- Night Express (1948)
- The Heroic Monsieur Boniface (1949)
- The Unexpected Voyager (1950)
- Amédée (1950)
- Edward and Caroline (1951)
- They Were Five (1952)
- A Woman's Treasure (1953)
- Rhine Virgin (1953)
- Spring, Autumn and Love (1955)
- Gas-Oil (1955)
- Meeting in Paris (1956)
- Short Head (1956)
- Folies-Bergère (1957)
- An Eye for an Eye (1957)
- The Gentleman from Epsom (1962)
- Maigret Sees Red (1963)
- That Tender Age (1964)

== Bibliography ==
- Waldman, Harry. Maurice Tourneur: The Life and Films. McFarland, 2001.
