= Saturnin Fabre =

French actor (1884–1961)

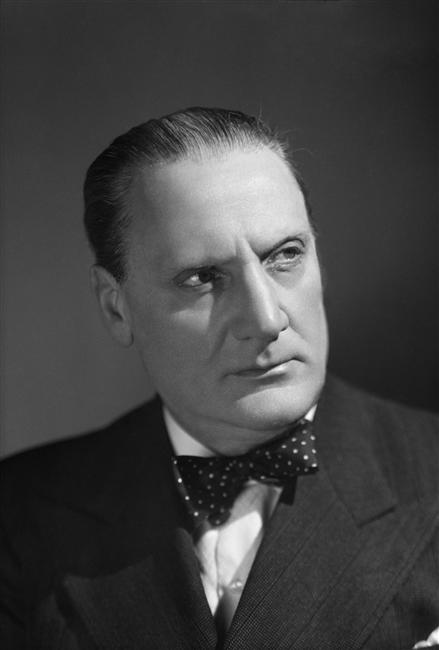
- Born: 4 April 1884; Sens, Yonne, France
- Died: 4 October 1961 (aged 77); Montgeron, Essonne, France
- Occupation: Actor

Saturnin Fabre (French pronunciation: [satyʁnɛ̃ fabʁ]; 4 April 1884 – 4 October 1961) was a French film actor.

== Selected filmography ==
- La rafale (1920) - comte de Bréchebel
- Mademoiselle de La Seiglière (1921)
- The Road Is Fine (1930) - Le professeur Pique
- Love Songs (1930) - M, Crispin
- My Cousin from Warsaw (1931) - Saint-Hilaire
- Atout cœur (1931) - Lefol
- The Darling of Paris (1931) - Hector
- The Improvised Son (1932) - M. Brassart
- The Premature Father (1933) - Le père Puma
- His Other Love (1934) - Monsieur Léopard - le directeur
- Casanova (1934) - M. Binetti
- Les deux canards (1934) - Le baron de Saint-Amour
- L'enfant du carnaval (1934) - Hubert
- On a trouvé une femme nue (1934) - Le marquis de la Ferronière
- Mam'zelle Spahi (1934) - Le colonel du 32ème de Spahis
- Hotel Free Exchange (1934) - Mathieu
- Le roman d'un jeune homme pauvre (1936) - Bévellan
- Excursion Train (1936) - M. Bring
- A Hen on a Wall (1936) - Monsieur Amédée
- Seven Men, One Woman (1936) - Le député Derain
- La guerre des gosses (1936) - L'instituteur Simon
- You Are Me (1936) - Adolphe Robinet - le résident
- The Bureaucrats (1936) - Le tondu
- Pépé le Moko (1937) - Le Grand Père
- Vous n'avez rien à déclarer? (1937) - Le professeur Puget
- Les dégourdis de la 11ème (1937) - L'inspecteur-général Burnous
- Ignace (1937) - Le baron Gédéon des Orfrais
- Le cantinier de la coloniale (1937) - Le capitaine
- Désiré (1937) - Adrien Corniche
- Le chanteur de minuit (1937) - Garnier
- Le gagnant (1937)
- The Woman Thief (1938) - L'académicien / L'accademico
- Golden Venus (1938) - Le duc de Sartène
- Gargousse (1938) - Joseph Lebrennois - le maire
- Beautiful Star (1938) - Lemarchal
- Tricoche and Cacolet (1938) - Monsieur Van der Pouf
- The Tamer (1938) - Maître Anatole Dupont
- The White Slave (1939) - Djemal Pacha
- Coral Reefs (1939) - Hobson
- The Mayor's Dilemma (1939) - Rossignol, le châtelain
- Monsieur Brotonneau (1939) - M. de Berville
- Nine Bachelors (1939) - Adhémar Colombinet de la Jonchère
- Love Cavalcade (1939) - Monsieur Dupont-Dufort
- Le Corsaire (1939)
- False Alarm (1940) - Monsieur Dalban
- Beating Heart (1940) - Monsieur Aristide
- The Suitors Club (1941) - Cabarus
- Ne bougez plus (1941) - Andromaque de Miremir
- Opéra-musette (1942) - Monsieur Honoré
- Mademoiselle Swing (1942) - Grégoire Dimitresco
- La Nuit fantastique (1942) - Le professeur Thalès
- White Wings (1943) - Siméon
- Marie-Martine (1943) - L'oncle Parpain
- The Midnight Sun (1943) - Ireniev
- Jeannou (1943) - Frochard
- Le merle blanc (1944) - Jules Leroy
- Lunegarde (1946) - Monsieur de Vertumne
- Christine Gets Married (1946) - Sébastien Aurelle - le musicien
- A Friend Will Come Tonight (1946) - Philippe Prunier
- Les J3 (1946) - Le proviseur du lycée
- Jeux de femmes (1946) - L'oncle Hubert
- On demande un ménage (1946) - Horace Rouvière
- Gates of the Night (1946) - Monsieur Sénéchal
- Ploum, ploum, tra-la-la (1947) - Basile Samara
- Si jeunesse savait... (1948) - Abdul
- Clochemerle (1948) - Alexandre Bourdillat
- Doctor Laennec (1949) - Laennec père
- The Widow and the Innocent (1949) - Achille Panoyau - l'accusé
- Miquette (1950) - Le professeur
- Rome Express (1950) - Le marquis Aldebert de la Tour Mirande
- The Girl from Maxim's (1950) - Le général Petypon du Grêlé
- The Marriage of Mademoiselle Beulemans (1950) - M. Delpierre
- The Little Cardinals (1951) - Horace Cardinal
- Holiday for Henrietta (1952) - Antoine - un consommateur
- Carnival (1953) - Dr. Caberlot
- Virgile (1953) - Le président
- The Most Wanted Man (1953) - W.W. Stone, l'avocat
- It's the Paris Life (1954) - Comte Gontran de Barfleur
- Service Entrance (1954) - Monsieur Delecluze (final film role)
