= Dolly (1929 film) =

1929 film directed by Pierre Colombier

- Directed by: Pierre Colombier
- Written by: Pierre Colombier
- Produced by: Jean de Merly
- Starring: Dolly Davis; André Roanne; Paul Ollivier
- Cinematography: Victor Arménise
- Production company: Exclusivité Jean de Merly
- Release date: 8 March 1929
- Country: France
- Languages: Silent; French intertitles

Dolly is a 1929 French silent comedy film directed by Pierre Colombier and starring Dolly Davis, André Roanne and Paul Ollivier. The film's sets were designed by the art director Jacques Colombier. It is also known by the alternative title Free and Twenty.

== Cast ==
- Dolly Davis as Dolly
- André Roanne as Robert Normand
- Paul Ollivier as Champigny
- Ady Cresso as Marianne Champigny
- Jacques Floury as Gilles

== Bibliography ==
- Rège, Philippe. Encyclopedia of French Film Directors, Volume 1. Scarecrow Press, 2009.
