= The Kings of Sport =

- Directed by: Pierre Colombier
- Written by: Germain Fried; Jean Guitton; Henri Jeanson
- Produced by: Ayres d'Aguiar
- Starring: Raimu; Fernandel; Jules Berry
- Cinematography: Victor Arménise; Robert Juillard
- Edited by: André Versein
- Music by: Roger Dumas
- Production company: Gray-Film
- Distributed by: Mondial Films
- Release date: 19 September 1937
- Running time: 102 minutes
- Country: France
- Language: French

The Kings of Sport (French: Les rois du sport) is a 1937 French comedy film directed by Pierre Colombier and starring Raimu, Fernandel and Jules Berry.

It was made at the Billancourt Studios in Paris. The film's sets were designed by the art director Jacques Colombier. The football scenes were shot at the Stade de l'Huveaune home of Olympique Marseille, who were the reigning champions of France at the time.

== Synopsis ==
Two waiters from Marseille become involved in the world of sports organisation and gambling.

== Cast ==
- Raimu as Jules de l'Estaque
- Fernandel as Fernand
- Jules Berry as Burette
- Lisette Lanvin as Antoinnette
- Georges Flamant as Jim Stanford
- Doumel as Le president du boxing-club
- Marcel Maupi as Le cireur
- Nita Raya as Lili
- Julien Carette as Vachette
- René Alié as Un journaliste
- John Anderson as Le boxeur
- Jacques Beauvais as Le maître d'hôtel
- Robert Berri as Un journaliste
- Bérétrot as Le speaker
- Chevauché as Petit rôle
- Marguerite de Morlaye as Une spectatrice du match
- Dortignac as L'arbitre
- Dumontier as Un soigneur
- Pierre Ferval as Un journaliste
- Paul Marcel as Le monsieur bousculé
- Franck Maurice as Un soigneur
- Marcel Melrac as Un agent du commissariat
- Robert Ralphy as Un dîneur
- Rolando as Un soigneur

== Bibliography ==
- Philippe Rège. Encyclopedia of French Film Directors, Volume 1. Scarecrow Press, 2009.
