= White Patrol =

1942 film directed by Christian Chamborant

- Directed by: Christian Chamborant
- Written by: Amédée Pons; Jacques Séverac
- Produced by: Claude Dolbert; Paul Tissier
- Starring: Sessue Hayakawa; Junie Astor; Paul Azaïs
- Cinematography: Alphonse Lucas
- Edited by: Madeleine Gug
- Music by: Jean Yatove
- Production company: Union Française de Production Cinématographique
- Distributed by: Union Française de Production Cinématographique
- Release date: 5 March 1942
- Running time: 89 minutes
- Country: France
- Language: French

White Patrol (French: Patrouille blanche) is a 1942 French mystery thriller film directed by Christian Chamborant and starring Sessue Hayakawa, Junie Astor and Paul Azaïs. Production began in 1939 but was delayed by the outbreak of the Second World War. The film's sets were designed by the art director Lucien Jaquelux.

== Cast ==
- Sessue Hayakawa as Halloway
- Junie Astor as Sandra
- Paul Azaïs as Victor
- Robert Le Vigan as Le commissaire Pascal
- Lucien Dalsace as Paul Dalbret
- Gaston Modot as Wong
- Nina Myral as Madame Galvin
- Albert Duvaleix as Galvin
- Roger Legris as Lebon
- Geneviève Beau as Christiane
- Primerose Perret as Pépette

== Bibliography ==
- Kennedy-Karpat, Colleen. Rogues, Romance, and Exoticism in French Cinema of the 1930s. Fairleigh Dickinson, 2013.
- Miyao, Daisuke . Sessue Hayakawa: Silent Cinema and Transnational Stardom. Duke University Press, 28 Mar 2007
- Rège, Philippe. Encyclopedia of French Film Directors, Volume 1. Scarecrow Press, 2009.
