= Miss Europe 1931 =

International beauty pageant

- Date: 5 February 1931
- Venue: Paris, France
- Entrants: 16
- Debuts: Estonia
- Withdrawals: Bulgaria, Czechoslovakia, Ireland, Poland
- Returns: Estonia
- Winner: Jeanne Juilla; France

Miss Europe 1931 was the fourth annual Miss Europe which was held live in Paris and the third under French journalist Maurice de Waleffe. 16 European girls competed in the third annual pageant. Miss France, Jeanne Juilla, won Miss Europe 1931.

== Results ==
=== Placements ===
Placement	Contestant
Miss Europe 1931	France – Jeanne Juilla
1st Runner-Up	Austria – Hertha van Haentjens
2nd Runner-Up	Germany – Ingrid Ruth Richard

== Delegates ==
- Austria – Hertha (Herta) van Haentjens
- Belgium – Anita Netta Duchateau
- Denmark – Inga Arvad
- England – Betty Grace Mason
- Estonia – Lilli Silberg
- France – Jeanne Juilla
- Germany – Ingrid Ruth Richard
- Greece – Chryssoula Rodis
- Holland – Mary Lelyveld
- Hungary – Maria Tasnady-Fekete
- Italy – Claudia Nocetti
- Romania – Tanti Vuroseanu
- Russia (in exile) – Marina Shalyapina
- Spain – Ermelina Carreño Rodríguez
- Turkey – Naschide Saffet Hanim
- Yugoslavia – Katica Urbanović

== National pageant notes ==
=== Debuts/Returns ===
- Estonia participated for the 1st time as its own country. Lilli Silberg was 1st Runner-up. Estonia was represented as the Baltic States in 1927.

=== Withdrawals ===
- Bulgaria, Czechoslovakia, Ireland, and Poland
