= Antonia (1935 film) =

1935 French film

- Directed by: Max Neufeld; Jean Boyer
- Written by: Melchior Lengyel (play); Jean Boyer
- Produced by: Herman Millakowsky
- Starring: Marcelle Chantal; Fernand Gravey; Josette Day
- Cinematography: Victor Arménise; Louis Née
- Edited by: Laslo Benedek
- Music by: Paul Abraham; Alfred Rode
- Production companies: Les Productions Milo Film; Société des Etablissements L. Gaumont
- Release date: 25 January 1935
- Running time: 87 minutes
- Country: France
- Language: French

Antonia (French: Antonia, romance hongroise) is a 1935 French musical comedy film directed by Jean Boyer and Max Neufeld and starring Marcelle Chantal, Fernand Gravey and Josette Day. It was shot at the Joinville Studios in Paris. A separate English-language version Temptation was also made.

The film's sets were designed by the art director Jacques Colombier.

== Cast ==
- Marcelle Chantal as Antonia
- Fernand Gravey as Le capitaine Douglas Parker
- Josette Day as Piri
- Pierre Larquey as La garçon
- Alice Tissot La directrice
- Guy Sloux as Le lieutenant Jonny
- Robert Arnoux as Pali
- Jean Worms as Bela de Palmay
- Pierre Finaly as Le directeur du théâtre
- Alfred Rode as Le musicien
- Odette Talazac as Marcza
- Pierre Athon

== Bibliography ==
- Wood, Linda. British Films, 1927–1939. British Film Institute, 1986.
