= Ignace (film) =

1937 film

- Directed by: Pierre Colombier
- Written by: Roger Dumas; Jean Manse
- Produced by: Ayres d'Aguiar
- Starring: Fernandel; Fernand Charpin; Alice Tissot
- Cinematography: Charles Bauer; Robert Lefebvre
- Edited by: André Versein
- Music by: Roger Dumas
- Production company: Gray-Film
- Distributed by: Gray-Film
- Release date: 28 April 1937
- Running time: 102 minutes
- Country: France
- Language: French

Ignace is a 1937 French musical comedy film directed by Pierre Colombier and starring Fernandel, Fernand Charpin and Alice Tissot. It was shot at the Joinville Studios of Pathé in Paris. The film's sets were designed by the art director Jacques Colombier.

== Synopsis ==
Ignace Boitaclou, a young peasant reservist, is called up for military duty. He is assigned as an orderly to the regimental colonel.

== Cast ==
- Fernandel as Le soldat Ignace Boitaclou
- Fernand Charpin as Le colonel Romuald Durosier
- Saturnin Fabre as Le baron Gédéon des Orfrais
- Alice Tissot as La colonelle Gabrielle Durosier
- Nita Raya as Loulette
- Charles Redgie as Le capitaine Boisdelile
- Claude May as Monique Durosier
- Andrex as Serge de Montroc
- Dany Lorys as Annette - la bonne
- Raymond Cordy as Le soldat Philibert
- Pierre Magnier as L'inspecteur général
- Madeleine Suffel as La curiste
- Léonce Corne as L'adjudant

== Bibliography ==
- Bessy, Maurice & Chirat, Raymond. Histoire du cinéma français: 1935-1939. Pygmalion, 1986.
- Brown, Tom. Spectacle in Classical Cinemas: Musicality and Historicity in the 1930s. Routledge, 2015.
- Crisp, Colin. Genre, Myth and Convention in the French Cinema, 1929-1939. Indiana University Press, 2002.
- Rège, Philippe. Encyclopedia of French Film Directors, Volume 1. Scarecrow Press, 2009.
