= Everybody Wins (1930 film) =

1930 film

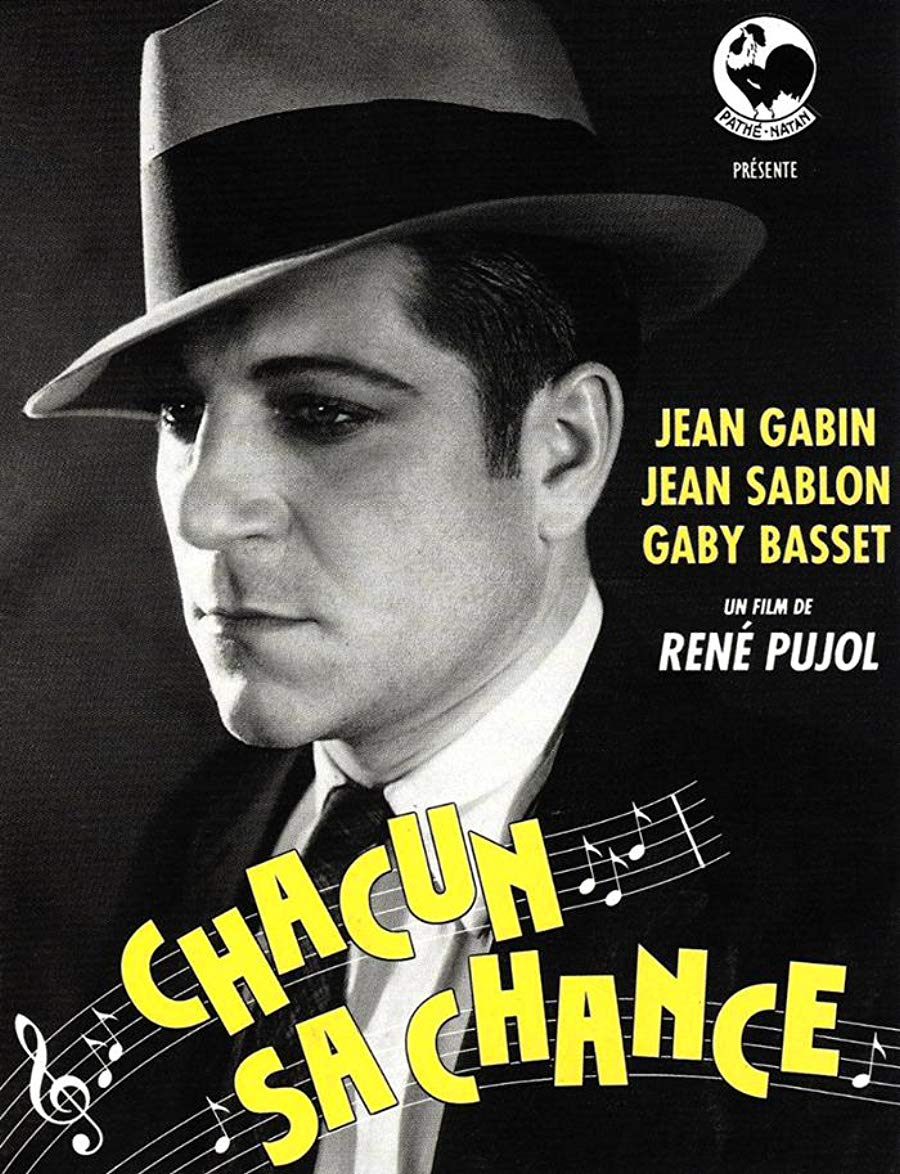
- Directed by: René Pujol; Hans Steinhoff
- Written by: Richard Arvay; Bruno Hardt-Warden; René Pujol; Charlie Roellinghoff
- Produced by: Marcel Hellman
- Starring: Renée Héribel; Gaby Basset; Jean Gabin
- Cinematography: Victor Arménise; Karl Puth
- Music by: Nico Dostal; Walter Kollo
- Production company: Marcel Hellmann Film
- Distributed by: Pathé-Natan
- Release date: 19 December 1930
- Running time: 76 minutes
- Countries: France; Germany
- Language: French

Everybody Wins (French: Chacun sa chance) is a 1930 French-German comedy film directed by René Pujol and Hans Steinhoff and starring Renée Héribel, Gaby Basset and Jean Gabin. It was made as a co-production between France and Germany, with a separate German-language version Headfirst into Happiness also being shot using a different cast.

It was shot at Pathé's Joinville Studios in Paris. The film's sets were designed by the art director Jacques Colombier.

== Synopsis ==
A shop salesman is mistaken for a baron, which leads him to be more attractive to the woman he is in love with.

== Cast ==
- Renée Héribel as La Baronne de Monteuil
- André Urban as Le Baron de Monteuil
- Gaby Basset as Simone
- Jean Gabin as Marcel Grivot
- Odette Josylla as Colette
- Jean Sablon as Jean d'Arthaud
- Hubert Daix as Directeur de magasin
- Raymond Cordy as Le pochard
- Germaine Laborde
- Hélène Christiane
- Josyane
- Jane Pierson
- Christiane Tourneur

== Bibliography ==
- Harriss, Joseph. Jean Gabin: The Actor Who Was France. McFarland, 2018.
