= Madeleine Suffel =

French actress (1899–1974)

- Born: 26 November 1899; Paris, France
- Died: 11 April 1974 (aged 74); Paris, France
- Occupation: Actress
- Years active: 1931–1974 (film)

Madeleine Suffel (1899–1974) was a French film and stage actress. She played supporting roles in a number of films from the early 1930s onwards.

== Selected filmography ==
- A Rare Bird (1935)
- School for Coquettes (1935)
- Good Luck (1935)
- The Scandalous Couple (1935)
- Martha (1936)
- The Great Refrain (1936)
- Counsel for Romance (1936)
- Under Western Eyes (1936)
- Taras Bulba (1936)
- Ignace (1937)
- Gibraltar (1938)
- Prison sans barreaux (1938)
- The Train for Venice (1938)
- Tricoche and Cacolet (1938)
- Whirlwind of Paris (1939)
- Miquette (1940)
- Monsieur Hector (1940)
- Serenade (1940)
- Colonel Pontcarral (1942)
- The Stairs Without End (1943)
- Monsieur des Lourdines (1943)
- Goodbye Leonard (1943)
- Death No Longer Awaits (1944)
- My First Love (1945)
- The Last Metro (1945)
- Roger la Honte (1946)
- The Murderer is Not Guilty (1946)
- Christine Gets Married (1946)
- The Lovers of Pont Saint Jean (1947)
- Naughty Martine (1947)
- Love Around the House (1947)
- The Unknown Singer (1947)
- Three Investigations (1948)
- The Eleven O'Clock Woman (1948)
- Miquette (1950)
- The Atomic Monsieur Placido (1950)
- Good Lord Without Confession (1953)
- The Porter from Maxim's (1953)
- Les Diaboliques (1955)
- Love in Jamaica (1957)
- Charming Boys (1957)
- The Bureaucrats (1959)
- The Bread Peddler (1963)

== Bibliography ==
- Barrot, Olivier & Chirat, Raymond. Noir et blanc: 250 acteurs du cinéma français, 1930-1960. Flammarion, 2000.
- Goble, Alan. The Complete Index to Literary Sources in Film. Walter de Gruyter, 1999.
- Palmer, Tim & Michael, Charlie. Directory of World Cinema: France. Intellect Books, 2013.
