= Latin Quarter (1939 film) =

1939 French film

- Directed by: Christian Chamborant; Pierre Colombier; Alexander Esway
- Written by: Maurice Dekobra; Pierre Lestringuez
- Starring: Bernard Lancret; Jean Tissier; Blanchette Brunoy; Junie Astor
- Cinematography: Marcel Grignon; Enzo Riccioni
- Edited by: Maurice Serein
- Music by: C.P. Simon
- Production company: Studio de la Seine
- Distributed by: Selb-Film
- Release date: 30 August 1939
- Running time: 101 minutes
- Country: France
- Language: French

Latin Quarter (French: Quartier Latin) is a 1939 French comedy film directed by Christian Chamborant, Pierre Colombier and Alexander Esway and starring Bernard Lancret, Jean Tissier, Blanchette Brunoy and Junie Astor. It was shot at the Courbevoie Studios in Paris and on location around the city. The film's sets were designed by the art director Georges Gratigny.

== Synopsis ==
A wealthy banker, bored with his life, heads to the Latin Quarter of Paris where he pretends to be a struggling artist. He falls in love with a student from the Sorbonne and moves into the same boarding house as her while continuing his pretence of poverty.

== Cast ==
- Bernard Lancret as Bernard
- Jean Tissier as Dominique
- Blanchette Brunoy as Michèle
- Junie Astor as Flossie
- Yves Deniaud as Napoléon
- Carine Nelson as Marika
- Jean Daurand as L'Ablette
- Oléo as Liliane
- Raymond Galle a Tancrède
- Edmond Ardisson as Biscoule
- Romain Bouquet as M. Benjamin
- Odette Talazac as La propriétaire
- Anthony Gildès as Le peintre
- Eddy Debray as M. Hervé
- Sylvia Bataille as Sylvia

== Bibliography ==
- Phillips, Alastair. City of Darkness, City of Light: Émigré Filmmakers in Paris, 1929-1939. Amsterdam University Press, 2004.
