= His Best Client =

1932 film directed by Pierre Colombier

- Directed by: Pierre Colombier
- Written by: Louis Verneuil; Madeleine Bussy
- Starring: Elvire Popesco; René Lefèvre; Hélène Robert
- Cinematography: Victor Arménise; Robert Lefebvre
- Music by: Marcel Pollet
- Production company: Pathé-Natan
- Distributed by: Pathé-Natan
- Release date: 16 December 1932
- Running time: 87 minutes
- Country: France
- Language: French

His Best Client (French: Sa meilleure cliente) is a 1932 French comedy film directed by Pierre Colombier and starring Elvire Popesco, René Lefèvre and Hélène Robert. The film's sets were designed by the art director Jacques Colombier.

== Synopsis ==
A pair of lovers open a beauty salon, but struggling for business they decide to pretend that she is really his mother and has been rejuvenated by a miraculous treatment they have.

== Cast ==
- Elvire Popesco as Edwige
- René Lefèvre as Gaston
- Hélène Robert as Hélène Chervin
- André Lefaur as Monsieur Chervin
- Charles Prince as Larnois
- Marcelle Monthil as Mlle. Yvonne
- Henri Kerny as Martin
- Noël Darzal as Jiimmy
- Yvonne Mirval as La vieille anglaise
- André Alerme
- Paul Bertrand
- Georges Bever
- Frank O'Neill
- Mercédès Brare
- Louise Dauville
- Jeanne Juillia
- Marthe Riche

== Bibliography ==
- Dayna Oscherwitz & MaryEllen Higgins. The A to Z of French Cinema. Scarecrow Press, 2009.
