= The Mascot (film) =

1935 film

- Directed by: Léon Mathot
- Written by: Henri Charles Chivot (libretto); Alfred Duru (libretto); René Pujol
- Produced by: Albert Lauzin
- Starring: Lucien Baroux; Germaine Roger; Thérèse Dorny
- Cinematography: Georges Clerc; Nikolai Toporkoff
- Edited by: Jacques Desagneaux
- Music by: Edmond Audran
- Production company: Les Films Mascotte
- Release date: 26 July 1935
- Running time: 100 minutes
- Country: France
- Language: French

The Mascot (French: La mascotte) is a 1935 French musical comedy film directed by Léon Mathot and starring Lucien Baroux, Germaine Roger and Thérèse Dorny. It is based on the 1880 Opéra comique of the same title. It was shot at the Billancourt Studios in Paris. The film's sets were designed by the art director Pierre Schild, while the costumes were created by Georges Annenkov.

== Synopsis ==
Bettina, a turkey keeper, gains a reputation for bringing good luck to those who employ her. She goes to work for the impoverished Laurent XVII who hopes to improve his finances.

== Cast ==
- Lucien Baroux as Laurent XVII
- Germaine Roger as Bettina
- Dranem as Rocco
- Thérèse Dorny as Dame Turlurette
- René Lestelly as Prince Fritellini
- Jean Tissier as Le docteur
- Pierre Labry as L'aubergiste

== Bibliography ==
- Bessy, Maurice & Chirat, Raymond. Histoire du cinéma français: 1935-1939. Pygmalion, 1986.
- Crisp, Colin. Genre, Myth and Convention in the French Cinema, 1929-1939. Indiana University Press, 2002.
- Goble, Alan. The Complete Index to Literary Sources in Film. Walter de Gruyter, 1999.
- Rège, Philippe. Encyclopedia of French Film Directors, Volume 1. Scarecrow Press, 2009.
