= Christine Gets Married =

1946 film

- Directed by: René Le Hénaff
- Written by: Eddy Ghilain; Alex Joffé; Jean Le Vitte; Jean Sacha
- Produced by: Robert Chabert; Bernard Jamet; Marcel Roux; Fernand Vidal
- Starring: Monique Rolland; Jean Murat; Huguette Duflos
- Cinematography: Jean Bourgoin
- Edited by: Fabienne Tzanck
- Music by: Jean Solar
- Production companies: Francinex; Les Productions F.V.
- Distributed by: Francinex
- Release date: 30 January 1946
- Running time: 88 minutes
- Country: France
- Language: French

Christine Gets Married (French: Christine se marie) is a 1946 French comedy film directed by René Le Hénaff and starring Monique Rolland, Jean Murat and Huguette Duflos. The film's sets were designed by the art director Jacques Colombier.

== Synopsis ==
In order to experience more of what life has to offer, Christine marries three men using her sister's identities. Shen then meets a fourth potential husband who she really likes and plans to marry him under he real name.

== Cast ==
- Monique Rolland as Christine
- Jean Murat as Serge - le docteur
- Huguette Duflos as L'assistante
- Saturnin Fabre as Sébastien Aurelle - le musicien
- Henri Guisol as Olivier - le journaliste
- Georgette Tissier as La dactylo
- Madeleine Suffel as La femme de chambre
- Andrée Guize as L'infirmière
- Alexandre Rignault as Armand - l'éleveur de renards

== Bibliography ==
- Parish, James Robert. Film Actors Guide: Western Europe. Scarecrow Press, 1977.
- Rège, Philippe. Encyclopedia of French Film Directors, Volume 1. Scarecrow Press, 2009.
