= The Tamer =

1938 film

- Belgian poster
- Directed by: Pierre Colombier
- Written by: Yves Allégret; Károly Nóti; René Pujol; Robert Thoeren; Jacques Viot
- Produced by: Henri Ullmann
- Starring: Saturnin Fabre; Jean-Pierre Kérien; Monique Rolland
- Cinematography: Armand Thirard
- Edited by: Maurice Serein
- Music by: Casimir Oberfeld
- Production company: Productions Cinésonor
- Distributed by: Les Distributeurs Français
- Release date: 14 December 1938
- Running time: 85 minutes
- Country: France
- Language: French

The Tamer (French: Le dompteur) is a 1938 French comedy film directed by Pierre Colombier and starring Saturnin Fabre, Jean-Pierre Kérien and Monique Rolland. The film's sets were designed by the art director Jacques Colombier.

== Synopsis ==
Raphaël inherits a travelling circus, on the condition that he take part in a show. He is terrified of wild animals, which leads to a plan to present him as the lion tamer using fake animals.

== Cast ==
- Dorville as Le directeur du cirque
- Saturnin Fabre as Maître Anatole Dupont
- Jean-Pierre Kérien as Raphaël
- Monique Rolland as Gaby
- Andrex as Bertrand
- Rosita Montenegro as Rosita
- Alice Tissot as Hortense

== Bibliography ==
- Bessy, Maurice & Chirat, Raymond. Histoire du cinéma français: 1935-1939. Pygmalion, 1986.
- Crisp, Colin. Genre, Myth and Convention in the French Cinema, 1929-1939. Indiana University Press, 2002.
- Rège, Philippe. Encyclopedia of French Film Directors, Volume 1. Scarecrow Press, 2009.
