= Prince Charming (1942 film) =

1942 film by Jean Boyer

- Directed by: Jean Boyer
- Written by: Michel Duran
- Starring: Lucien Baroux; Renée Faure; Jimmy Gaillard
- Cinematography: Victor Arménise
- Edited by: Louisette Hautecoeur
- Music by: Georges Van Parys
- Production company: Compagnie Commerciale Française Cinématographique
- Distributed by: Compagnie Commerciale Française Cinématographique
- Release date: 26 March 1942
- Running time: 100 minutes
- Country: France
- Language: French

Prince Charming (French: Le prince charmant) is a 1942 French comedy film directed by Jean Boyer and starring Lucien Baroux, Renée Faure and Jimmy Gaillard. It was shot at the Saint-Maurice Studios in Paris which was then under German Occupation. The film's sets were designed by the art director Jacques Colombier.

== Cast ==
- Lucien Baroux as Ambroise Bréchaud
- Renée Faure as Rosine
- Jimmy Gaillard as Thierry
- Christian Gérard as Arsène
- Robert Arnoux as Ernest
- Sabine André as Ginette
- Germaine Lix as Madame Bréchaud
- Germaine Godefroid as La comtesse
- Louis Florencie as François
- Jean-Louis Allibert as Valentin
- André Ekian as Et son orchestre
- Pierre Ferval
- Guita Karen
- Lucienne Legrand
- Jacqueline Marbaux
- Franck Maurice
- Maurice Salabert as Le patron du café
- Simone Signoret
- Renée Thorel
- André Varennes
- Léon Walther as Le comte de Danrémont

== Bibliography ==
- Hayward, Susan. Simone Signoret: The Star as Cultural Sign. A&C Black, 2004.
