= Temptation (1934 film) =

1934 film directed by Max Neufeld

- Anthony Hankey, Stewart Rome and Frances Day in the film
- Directed by: Max Neufeld
- Written by: Melchior Lengyel (play); Stafford Dickens; Paul Merzbach; Max Neufeld; Ákos Tolnay
- Starring: Frances Day; Stewart Rome; Anthony Hankey
- Cinematography: Victor Arménise; Louis Née
- Edited by: Laslo Benedek
- Music by: Paul Abraham
- Production companies: Les Productions Milo Film; Société des Etablissements L. Gaumont
- Distributed by: Gaumont British Distributors
- Release date: 1934
- Running time: 77 minutes
- Countries: France; United Kingdom
- Language: English

Temptation is a 1934 British-French musical comedy film directed by Max Neufeld and starring Frances Day, Stewart Rome and Anthony Hankey. It was written by Stafford Dickens, Paul Merzbach, Neufeld and Ákos Tolnay, based on the play by Melchior Lengyel. It is the English-language version of Antonia (1935).

== Plot ==
Actress Antonia Palmay has retired to enjoy married life on the estate of her husband, a gentleman farmer. After a domestic tiff, she goes to the Budapest opera house and meets aviator William Parker, with whom she enjoys a brief flirtation.

== Cast ==
- Frances Day as Antonia Palmay
- Stewart Rome as Paul Palmay
- Anthony Hankey as William Parker
- Peggy Simpson as Piri
- Mickey Brantford as Johnny
- Lucy Beaumont as headmistress
- Billy Watts as Gus
- C. Denier Warren as director
- Effie Atherton as Vera Hanka
- Molly Hamley-Clifford as Maresa
- Alfred Rode and His Tzigane Orchestra as themselves

== Production ==
The film was made at the Joinville Studios in Paris with sets designed by the art director Jacques Colombier.

== Reception ==
The Daily Film Renter wrote: "Imaginative direction achieves an atmosphere of gaiety which is not confined to haunting music and songs. The players express it, it sparkles in the delicate comedy touches, and even the settings are 'in tune' with the prevailing spirit of Hungarian romanticism. The personality of Frances Day, however, clinches the film's appeal. Her vivacity and sudden flashes of provocative emotion will win the hearts of most audiences. Stewart Rome is suitably dignified as the country husband, and Anthony Hankey, as the airman, is an engaging young man of whom we should see more."

Picture Show wrote: "Frances Day's charming performance easily outstrips anything she has previously done on the screen, and her flirtation with the flying-officer on the evening after her quarrel with her husband is a sheer joy to watch and listen to. Anthony Hankey is excellent as the officer, Stewart Rome is good as the husband who prefers the simple life ... The superb photography and delicate direction and fine settings contribute to the all-round excellence of this production."

Variety wrote: "There seems no reason why this should not be a good picture, but it somehow just escapes. ... The natural settings are attractive, and there are many humorous touches that make the story entertaining. Characters, however, do not fit into their background. Stewart Rome looks and acts exactly like a charming English gentleman – never once conveying the impression that he is an [sic] Hungarian farmer. Peggy Simpson could never be mistaken for anything but an English schoolgirl. Frances Day is more at ease in her role of ex-actress, and the youthful lover of Anthony Hankey displays a pleasing personality. Adequate second feature."
