= Grey's Thirteenth Investigation =

1937 film

- Directed by: Pierre Maudru
- Written by: Pierre Maudru
- Based on: Grey's Thirteenth Investigation by Max Viterbo
- Produced by: André Dugès
- Starring: Maurice Lagrenée; Raymond Cordy; Colette Darfeuil
- Cinematography: Raoul Aubourdier; Jean-Paul Goreaud
- Music by: Albert Chantrier
- Production company: Films Régent
- Release date: 18 June 1937
- Running time: 85 minutes
- Country: France
- Language: French

Grey's Thirteenth Investigation (French: La treizième enquête de Grey) is a 1937 French crime film directed by Pierre Maudru and starring Maurice Lagrenée, Raymond Cordy and Colette Darfeuil. It was based on play by Max Viterbo, inspired by the character of Inspector Grey created by Alfred Gragnon. It was the third of series of four films featuring the detective. The film's sets were designed by the art director Lucien Carré.

== Cast ==
- Maurice Lagrenée as L'inspecteur Grey
- Raymond Cordy as Corvetto
- Paule Dagrève as Rosa Schneider
- Colette Darfeuil as Daisy Garden
- Jean Brochard as L'inspecteur Poussin
- Philippe Hersent as Bernard Dartmore
- Fernand Mailly as Docteur Dartmore
- Lucien Ferney as Le directeur de l'hôtel
- Ghyslaine as Bessy Gould
- Ky Duyen as Okata - l'impresario japonais
- Eddy Debray as Louis
- Sylvia Cobs as La manucure
- Renée Piat as La danseuse
- Ketty Pierson as La journaliste
- Lily Fairlie as Catherine

== Bibliography ==
- Bessy, Maurice & Chirat, Raymond. Histoire du cinéma français: 1935-1939. Pygmalion, 1986.
- Crisp, Colin. Genre, Myth and Convention in the French Cinema, 1929-1939. Indiana University Press, 2002.
- Goble, Alan. The Complete Index to Literary Sources in Film. Walter de Gruyter, 1999.
- Rège, Philippe. Encyclopedia of French Film Directors, Volume 1. Scarecrow Press, 2009.
