= Private Life (1942 film) =

1942 film

- Directed by: Walter Kapps
- Written by: Jean-Louis Bouquet; Jacqueline de Marichalar
- Produced by: André Dugès
- Starring: Marie Bell; Jean Galland; Robert Le Vigan; Ginette Leclerc
- Cinematography: Paul Cotteret
- Music by: Claude Delvincourt
- Production company: Films Régent et Boisserand
- Distributed by: Les Films Georges Muller
- Release date: 29 May 1942
- Running time: 80 minutes
- Country: France
- Language: French

Private Life (French: Vie privée) is a 1942 French drama film directed by Walter Kapps and starring Marie Bell, Jean Galland, Robert Le Vigan and Ginette Leclerc. The film's sets were designed by the art director Raymond Gabutti.

== Synopsis ==
A celebrated and popular actress once had a brief affair with a man leading to the birth of her child. Her reputation and possible marriage to a film director are threatened by a rival spreading slander about her private life.

== Cast ==
- Marie Bell as Florence
- Jean Galland as Jean Dorcier
- Robert Le Vigan as Rémi Géraud
- Ginette Leclerc as Ginette
- Blanchette Brunoy as Sylvie
- Claude Amaya as Claudine
- Alfred Baillou as Un assistant
- Brigitte Bargès as L'habilleuse
- Jacqueline Carlier as Une journaliste
- Marfa d'Hervilly as La directrice
- Henri Debain as Le dialoguiste
- Eugène Frouhins as Un ami de Rémi
- Yves Furet as Le dessinateur
- Albert Malbert as Le directeur du journal
- Teddy Michaud as Un ami de Rémi
- Ketty Pierson as Une journaliste
- Germaine Reuver as Madame Pascal
- Philippe Richard as Le directeur
- Roberta as La chanteuse
- Gaston Rullier as Albert
- Georges Sellier as L'avocat

== Bibliography ==
- Rège, Philippe. Encyclopedia of French Film Directors, Volume 1. Scarecrow Press, 2009.
- Siclier, Jacques. La France de Pétain et son cinéma. H. Veyrier, 1981.
