= Anyone Can Kill Me =

1957 film

- Belgian poster
- Directed by: Henri Decoin
- Written by: Henri Decoin; Albert Simonin; André Versini
- Produced by: Maurizio Danon; Georges Sénamaud
- Starring: François Périer; Peter van Eyck; Anouk Aimée
- Cinematography: Pierre Montazel
- Edited by: Claude Durand
- Music by: Jean Marion
- Production company: Sofradis
- Distributed by: Sofradis
- Release date: 6 December 1957
- Running time: 102 minutes
- Countries: France; Italy
- Language: French

Anyone Can Kill Me (French: Tous peuvent me tuer, Italian: Tutti possono uccidermi) is a 1957 French-Italian crime drama film directed by Henri Decoin and starring François Périer, Peter van Eyck and Anouk Aimée. It was shot at the Epinay Studios in Paris. The film's sets were designed by the art director Raymond Gabutti.

== Synopsis ==
A gang of criminals conduct a robbery and hide the stolen jewels in the base of statue. They are sentenced to a short stretch in prison and plan to recover the proceeds of the robbery once their sentence is finished. However, one by one, the members of the gang meet sudden and unexpected deaths.

== Cast ==
- François Périer as Paul - le directeur de la prison
- Peter van Eyck as Cyril Gad
- Anouk Aimée as Isabelle
- Darío Moreno as Luigi Falconi
- Eleonora Rossi Drago as Odette - la femme du directeur
- Pierre Mondy as Émile Chanu
- André Versini as Antoine 'Tony' Lefébure
- Jean-Pierre Marielle as Jérôme
- Jean-Claude Brialy as Un inspecteur de police
- Mario David as Paulo - un détenu
- Albert Michel as Le gardien-brigadier Bricart
- Olivier Darrieux as Un gardien
- Charles Gérard as Un détenu
- Louis Viret as Le patron du bistrot qui chante la romance
- André Jocelyn as Le banquier
- Pierre-Louis as Gaston Berlioux - un complice de Gad
- Pierre Dudan as Fernand
- Francis Blanche as La Bonbonne
- Franco Fabrizi as Karl Herman

== Bibliography ==
- Bock, Hans-Michael & Bergfelder, Tim. The Concise Cinegraph: Encyclopaedia of German Cinema. Berghahn Books, 2009.
- Chiti, Roberto & Poppi, Roberto. Dizionario del cinema italiano: Dal 1945 al 1959. Gremese Editore, 1991.
