= Fanfare of Love =

1935 film

- Italian release poster
- Directed by: Richard Pottier
- Written by: Max Bronnet; Michael Logan; Pierre Prévert; René Pujol; Robert Thoeren
- Produced by: Pierre Voisin
- Starring: Fernand Gravey; Betty Stockfeld; Julien Carette
- Cinematography: Jean Bachelet; André Dantan
- Edited by: Pierre Méguérian
- Music by: Joe Hajos
- Production company: Solar-Films
- Distributed by: Éclair-Journal
- Release date: 15 November 1935
- Running time: 115 minutes
- Country: France
- Language: French

Fanfare of Love (French: Fanfare d'amour) is a 1935 French comedy film directed by Richard Pottier and starring Fernand Gravey, Betty Stockfeld and Julien Carette. The film's art direction was by Max Heilbronner. The story was remade in West Germany in 1951 as Fanfares of Love and then in 1959 as the American film Some Like It Hot.

== Synopsis ==
During the Great Depression, two unemployed male musicians disguise themselves as women so they can join an all-female orchestra heading for the French Riviera. They soon find themselves both attracted to a female musician in the group, Gaby, creating a romantic rivalry. Calling their authentic selves the brothers of their female personas, they attempt to romance her through strategic costume changes while being policed by the domineering trombone player and denmother, Lydia, and sexually harassed by the male orchestra director.

== Cast ==
- Fernand Gravey as Jean
- Betty Stockfeld as Gaby
- Julien Carette as Pierre
- Gaby Basset as Poupette
- Jacques Louvigny as Alibert
- Pierre Larquey as Emile
- Madeleine Guitty as Lydia
- Jane Lamy
- Ginette Leclerc
- Palau
- Paul Lovetall
- Eugène Frouhins
- Anthony Gildès
- Paul Marthès
- Henri Vilbert
- Roger Duchesne
- Paul Demange
- Josyane Lane

== Bibliography ==
- Terri Ginsberg & Andrea Mensch. A Companion to German Cinema. John Wiley & Sons, 2012.
