= Anthony Gildès =

French actor (1856–1941)

Anthony Gildès (13 August 1856 – 6 October 1941) was a French actor.

Anthony Gildès was born Anatole Gleizes in Metz, France. He died in Paris at age 85.

== Selected filmography ==
- The Zone of Death (1917)
- The Torture of Silence (1917)
- The Man with the Hispano (1926)
- American Love (1931)
- All That's Not Worth Love (1931)
- The Yellow Dog (1932)
- That Scoundrel Morin (1932)
- The Red Robe (1933)
- Toto (1933)
- The Abbot Constantine (1933)
- Lake of Ladies (1934)
- The Imaginary Invalid (1934)
- If I Were Boss (1934)
- Hotel Free Exchange (1934)
- Prince Jean (1934)
- Dora Nelson (1935)
- Fanfare of Love (1935)
- Justin de Marseille (1935)
- Paris Camargue (1935)
- 27 Rue de la Paix (1936)
- Moutonnet (1936)
- The King (1936)
- Monsieur Personne (1936)
- Samson (1936)
- The Green Jacket (1937)
- In Venice, One Night (1937)
- Chaste Susanne (1937)
- The House Opposite (1937)
- Josette (1937)
- The Ladies in the Green Hats (1937)
- The Pearls of the Crown (1937)
- Alexis, Gentleman Chauffeur (1938)
- The Most Beautiful Girl in the World (1938)
- Vidocq (1939)
- My Aunt the Dictator (1939)
- Latin Quarter (1939)
- His Uncle from Normandy (1939)
- Entente Cordiale (1939)
- Miquette (1940)
- Radio Surprises (1940)
- Portrait of Innocence (1941)
- Hopes (1941)
- Night in December (1941)
- First Ball (1941)
- Portrait of Innocence (1941)
- Caprices (1942)
