= J'ai quelque chose à vous dire =

1930 film

- Directed by: Marc Allégret
- Written by: René Pujol
- Starring: Fernandel; Pierre Darteuil
- Music by: Dennis Scanlan
- Distributed by: Les Artistes Associés
- Release date: 1930
- Running time: 21 mins 25 secs
- Country: France
- Language: French

J'ai quelque chose à vous dire (English: I have something to say to you) is a French film from 1930. It was film director Marc Allégret's second film short, the first being La Meilleure bobone, released a year earlier.

== Plot ==
Pierre Deneige (played by Fernandel), well known as a scoundrel, is the lover of a married woman (played by Colette Clauday), and goes to visit her. However, when he arrives the woman (who he assumes to be his lover) inside the apartment he goes into tells him of another lover, making Pierre think that she is being unfaithful to him. However, it turns out he is on the wrong floor, and has been talking to the wrong woman. He goes upstairs and is confronted by his lover's husband.

== Cast (as credited) ==
- Fernandel : Pierre Deneige
- Colette Clauday : la femme (English: the woman)
- Pierre Darteuil : le mari (English: the husband)
- Paulette Dubost : la femme de chambre (English: the chambermaid)
