= A Golden Widow =

1969 film

- Directed by: Michel Audiard
- Written by: Michel Audiard; Jean-Marie Poiré; Odette Joyeux
- Produced by: Maurice Jacquin
- Starring: Michèle Mercier; Claude Rich; Roger Carel
- Cinematography: Georges Barsky; Pierre Petit
- Edited by: Catherine Kelber; Hélène Plemiannikov
- Music by: Jacques Loussier
- Production companies: Comacico; Les Films Copernic; Mars Film; Roxy Film; Ultra Film
- Distributed by: Les Films Paramount
- Release date: 24 October 1969
- Running time: 85 minutes
- Countries: France; Italy; West Germany
- Language: French

A Golden Widow (French: Une veuve en or) is a 1969 comedy film directed by Michel Audiard and starring Michèle Mercier, Claude Rich and Roger Carel. It was made as a co-production between France, Italy and West Germany.

The film's sets were designed by the art directors Jean d'Eaubonne and Raymond Gabutti.

== Synopsis ==
A woman discovers that she has inherited a huge fortune from a relation, but the unusual terms of inheritance state that she must be a widow, otherwise the money will go elsewhere. She seeks to get a gangster to murder her sculptor husband who in turn goes to other gangsters to seek protection.

== Cast ==
- Michèle Mercier as Delphine Berger
- Claude Rich as Antoine Berger
- Roger Carel as Aristophane Percankas - un riche armateur grec
- Jean Carmet as Un membre du Yiddish International Power
- Daniel Ceccaldi as Le conservateur du musée
- Jean-Pierre Darras as Rapha - le chef du syndicat du crime
- Mario David as Monsieur Sigmund - un admirateur zurichois
- Folco Lulli as Le Sicilien - un tueur
- André Pousse as Pierre Déricourt de Savignac dit Pierrot le Farceur
- Sim as Il Vecchio - un tueur sur le retour
- Jacques Dufilho as Joseph - un détective
- Max Amyl as Le Pierrot
- Jean Martin as Un lieutenant

== Bibliography ==
- Oscherwitz, Dayna & Higgins, MaryEllen. The A to Z of French Cinema. Scarecrow Press, 2009.
