= Mahlia the Mestiza =

1943 film

- Directed by: Walter Kapps
- Written by: Jean Francoux (novel); Léo Mora; Paul Nivoix
- Produced by: Charles Fasquelle
- Starring: Käthe von Nagy; Jean Servais; Georges Paulais
- Cinematography: Christian Matras
- Edited by: Renée Guérin
- Music by: Faustin Jeanjean; Rinaldo Rinaldi
- Production company: Combel Films
- Distributed by: C.F.D.F.
- Release date: 15 December 1943
- Running time: 93 minutes
- Country: France
- Language: French

Mahlia the Mestiza (French: Mahlia la métisse) is a 1943 French drama film directed by Walter Kapps and starring Käthe von Nagy, Jean Servais and Georges Paulais. The film had a lengthy and troubled production, as it began shooting in 1939 before the outbreak of the Second World War.

== Cast ==
- Käthe von Nagy as Mahlia - a mixed race woman adopted by a French couple
- Jean Servais as Henri de Roussière - the son of Mahlia's adoptive parents
- Georges Paulais as Mahlia's father
- Catherine Fonteney as Madame de Roussière - Mahlia's adoptive mother
- Pierre Magnier as Le docteur Moreuil (Dr. Moreuil)
- Ky Duyen as Sao
- Roger Karl as Tchang - a rich and sleezy man who covets Mahlia
- Brigitte Bargès
- Jacques Baumer
- Pierre Labry
- Philina Loquez
- France Mooréa
- Olga Pauletti
- Georges Péclet
- Janine Viénot

== Bibliography ==
- Hans-Michael Bock and Tim Bergfelder. The Concise Cinegraph: An Encyclopedia of German Cinema. Berghahn Books.
