= Walter Kapps =

French film director

- Born: Jacques Henri Nusbaume; Constantinople
- Died: 1 February 1975 (aged 67); Paris

Walter Kapps (September 13, 1907 - February 1, 1975), was a French film director.

== Partial filmography ==
- 1936 : Les Gaietés du palace
- 1937 : Pantins d'amour
- 1939 : Case of Conscience
- 1942 : Private Life
- 1943 : Mahlia la métisse
- 1947 : Une aventure de Polop
- 1947 : Le Studio en folie
- 1947 : Plume la poule
- 1955 : Mademoiselle from Paris
- 1957 : Paris clandestin
- 1959 : Détournement de mineures
- 1960 : Amour, autocar et boîtes de nuit
