= Monique Rolland =

French film actress

- Born: Rolande-Henriette Lapierre; 17 December 1913; Paris, France
- Died: 27 September 1999 (aged 85)
- Other name: Monique Lapierre
- Occupation: Actress
- Years active: 1930 - 1946 (film)

Monique Rolland (17 December 1913 – 27 September 1999) was a French film actress. She appeared in the 1932 film Narcotics.

== Selected filmography ==
- Narcotics (1932)
- The Barber of Seville (1933)
- Paris-Deauville (1934)
- The Midnight Prince (1934)
- Paris Camargue (1935)
- A Rare Bird (1936)
- Charley's Aunt (1936)
- A Hen on a Wall (1936)
- Maria of the Night (1936)
- The Blue Mouse (1936)
- The Alibi (1937)
- The Beauty of Montparnasse (1937)
- The West (1938)
- The Tamer (1938)
- Durand Jewellers (1938)
- Narcisse (1940)
- Paradise Lost (1940)
- Foolish Husbands (1941)
- Christine Gets Married (1946)

== Bibliography ==
- Youngkin, Stephen. The Lost One: A Life of Peter Lorre. University Press of Kentucky, 2005.
