= Nine Bachelors =

1939 film

- Directed by: Sacha Guitry
- Written by: Sacha Guitry
- Produced by: Joseph Bercholz; Edouard Gide
- Starring: Sacha Guitry; Max Dearly; Elvire Popesco
- Cinematography: Victor Arménise
- Edited by: Maurice Serein
- Music by: Adolphe Borchard
- Production company: Société des Films Gibé
- Distributed by: Compagnie Commerciale Française Cinématographique
- Release date: 27 October 1939
- Running time: 125 minutes
- Country: France
- Language: French

Nine Bachelors (French: Ils étaient neuf célibataires) is a 1939 French comedy film directed by Sacha Guitry and starring Guitry, Max Dearly and Elvire Popesco.

It was shot at the Joinville Studios in Paris and on location in the city. The film's sets were designed by the art director Jacques Colombier.

== Synopsis ==
An opportunist dreams up a new scheme to make money when the French government passes a law forbidding foreigners from living in France.

== Partial cast ==
- Sacha Guitry as Jean Lécuyer
- Max Dearly as Athanase Outriquet
- Elvire Popesco as Comtesse Stacia Batchefskaïa
- Victor Boucher as Alexandre
- Saturnin Fabre as Adhémar Colombinet de la Jonchère
- André Lefaur as Adolphe
- Raymond Aimos as Agénor
- Gaston Dubosc as Antonin Rousselier
- Marguerite Deval as Mme Picaillon de Chéniset
- Marguerite Moreno as Consuelo Rodriguez
- Marguerite Pierry as Isabelle Patureau
- Betty Stockfeld as Margaret Brown
- Pauline Carton as Clémentine
