= Germaine Roger =

French actress and singer

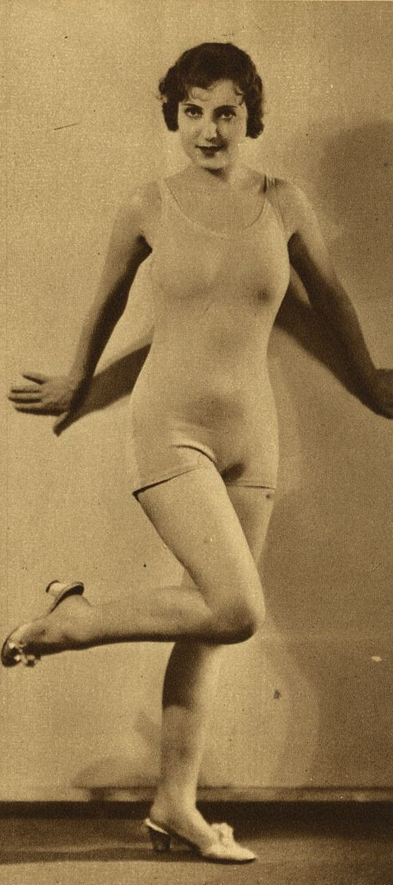
- Roger in 1933
- Born: 12 February 1910; Marseille, France
- Died: 20 April 1975 (aged 65); Savigny-sur-Orge, France
- Occupations: Actress, singer
- Years active: 1932–1939 (film)

Germaine Roger (1910–1975) was a French actress and operetta singer.

== Selected filmography ==
- Tossing Ship (1932)
- Student's Hotel (1932)
- A Weak Woman (1933)
- The Princess's Whim (1934)
- Three Sailors (1934)
- The Mascot (1935)
- Excursion Train (1936)
- Jacques and Jacotte (1936)

== Bibliography ==
- Goble, Alan. The Complete Index to Literary Sources in Film. Walter de Gruyter, 1999.
