= Émile Natan =

Romanian-born French film producer

- Born: 6 May 1906; Iași, Romania
- Died: 8 December 1962 (aged 56); Paris, France
- Occupation: Producer
- Years active: 1930-1961 (film)

Émile Natan (1906–1962) was a Romanian-born French film producer. He was the brother of Bernard Natan, the head of Pathé-Natan.

== Selected filmography ==
- Accused, Stand Up! (1930)
- Little Lise (1930)
- Levy and Company (1930)
- Monsieur the Duke (1931)
- Gloria (1931)
- All That's Not Worth Love (1931)
- The Dream (1931)
- Orange Blossom (1932)
- Beauty Spot (1932)
- The Wonderful Day (1932)
- The Levy Department Stores (1932)
- Once Upon a Time (1933)
- Theodore and Company (1933)
- Toto (1933)
- Arlette and Her Fathers (1934)
- Tartarin of Tarascon (1934)
- Justin de Marseille (1935)
- The Crew (1935)
- Koenigsmark (1935)
- The King (1936)
- Tricoche and Cacolet (1938)
- After Love (1948)
- Imperial Violets (1952)
- The Beautiful Otero (1954)
- The Triumph of Michael Strogoff (1961)

== Bibliography ==
- Andrew, Dudley. Mists of Regret: Culture and Sensibility in Classic French Film. Princeton University Press, 1995.
