= Jacques and Jacotte =

1936 film

- Directed by: Robert Péguy
- Written by: Robert Péguy
- Produced by: Charles Battesti; Robert Péguy
- Starring: Roger Tréville; Jacotte; Germaine Roger
- Cinematography: Nicolas Hayer; Marcel Villet
- Music by: Jane Bos
- Release date: 1936
- Running time: 80 minutes
- Country: France
- Language: French

Jacques and Jacotte (French: Jacques et Jacotte) is a 1936 French comedy film directed by Robert Péguy and starring Roger Tréville, Jacotte and Germaine Roger.

== Overview ==
Jacotte and her older sister Annie live in a Montmartrois workshop where Annie paints pictures of flowers. But the paintings do not sell. The bailiff threatens to seize the furniture, so Jacotte decides to go see the owner. Jacques is conquered by the little girl, and soon after, by Annie.

== Cast ==
- Roger Tréville as Jacques
- Jacotte as Jacotte
- Germaine Roger as Annie
- François Rodon as Le petit Tot
- Milly Mathis as La concierge
- Marcel Carpentier as L'huissier
- Ginette Leclerc
- Émile Saint-Ober
- Jacques Derives

== Bibliography ==
- Crisp, Colin. Genre, Myth and Convention in the French Cinema, 1929-1939. Indiana University Press, 2002.
