= The King (1936 film) =

1936 film directed by Pierre Colombier

- Directed by: Pierre Colombier
- Written by: Louis Verneuil; Emile Arène (play); Gaston Arman de Caillavet (play); Robert de Flers (play)
- Produced by: Emile Natan; Joseph Spigler
- Starring: Victor Francen; Raimu; Gaby Morlay
- Cinematography: Jules Kruger
- Edited by: Jean Pouzet
- Music by: Billy Colson
- Production company: Les Films Modernes
- Distributed by: Héraut Film
- Release date: 30 October 1936
- Running time: 113 minutes
- Country: France
- Language: French

The King (French: Le roi) is a 1936 French comedy film directed by Pierre Colombier and starring Victor Francen, Raimu and Gaby Morlay. King Jean IV of Cerdagne visits Paris to sign an important treaty where he becomes involved with an actress and a dishonest Senator.

The film's sets were designed by the art director Jacques Colombier.

== Cast ==
- Victor Francen as Le roi Jean IV de Cerdagne - en visite à Paris
- Raimu as M. Bourdier - un riche industriel et sénateur qui reçoit le Roi
- Gaby Morlay as Marthe Bourdier - la femme de l'industriel
- Elvire Popesco as Thérèse Marnix - une actrice célèbre
- Hélène Robert as Suzette Bourdier
- Christian Argentin as Gabrier
- Paul Amiot as Lelorrain
- Gaston Dubosc as L'évêque
- Albert Duvaleix as Cormeau
- Jean Gobet as Rivelot
- Philippe Hersent as Sernin de Chamarande
- Georges Péclet as Fouchart
- Frédéric Duvallès as M. Blond
- Marguerite de Morlaye as La marquise de Chamarande
- Edith Gallia
- Anthony Gildès as Le président des restrictions
- Gustave Hamilton
- André Lefaur as Le marquis de Chamarande

== Bibliography ==
- Andrews, Dudley. Mists of Regret: Culture and Sensibility in Classic French Film. Princeton University Press, 1995.
