= Maria of the Night =

1936 film

- Directed by: Willy Rozier
- Written by: Willy Rozier
- Starring: Gina Manès; Paul Bernard; Monique Rolland
- Cinematography: Georges Lucas
- Edited by: Raymond Lamy; Willy Rozier
- Music by: Jacques Belasco
- Production company: Fédéral Film
- Release date: 3 July 1936
- Running time: 80 minutes
- Country: France
- Language: French

Maria of the Night (French: Maria de la Nuit) is a 1936 French drama film directed by Willy Rozier and starring Gina Manès, Paul Bernard and Monique Rolland. The film's sets were designed by the art director Robert-Jules Garnier.

== Synopsis ==
Jacques is forced to free France after being accused of a crime he didn't commit. He lives a life of poverty and desperation, but meets and falls in love with Maria, a cabaret singer. Laurence, the sister of the real culprit of the crime, heads to Spain in an effort to rehabilitate Jacques.

== Cast ==
- Gina Manès as Maria de la Nuit
- Paul Bernard as Jacques
- Monique Rolland as Laurence
- Abel Tarride as Le président Revel
- Camille Bert
- Henri Bosc
- Lina d'Acosta
- Lucien Dairès
- Pedro Elviro
- Mademoiselle Landry
- Germaine Lix
- Georges Marceau
- Paul Marcel
- Gilbert Périgneaux
- Nicolas Redelsperger
- Ingrid Richard
- Marcel Sicard
- Sinctalowa

== Bibliography ==
- Bessy, Maurice & Chirat, Raymond. Histoire du cinéma français: 1935–1939. Pygmalion, 1986.
- Crisp, Colin. Genre, Myth and Convention in the French Cinema, 1929–1939. Indiana University Press, 2002.
- Rège, Philippe. Encyclopedia of French Film Directors, Volume 1. Scarecrow Press, 2009.
