= Maurice Lagrenée =

French actor

Maurice Lagrenée (1 July 1893 - 23 May 1955) was a French film actor.

Lagrenée was born Maurice-Jules Guichard in Sivry-Courtry and died in Paris at age 61.

== Selected filmography ==
- Jean Chouan (1926)
- The Champion Cook (1932)
- The Night at the Hotel (1932)
- Inspector Grey (1936)
- The Mutiny of the Elsinore (1936)
- Grey's Thirteenth Investigation (1937)
- Men of Prey (1937)
- Vidocq (1939)
- Pamela (1945)
- The Faceless Enemy (1946)
- Monelle (1948)
- Three Investigations (1948)
- Skipper Next to God (1951)
