= The Mysterious Lady (1936 film) =

- Directed by: Robert Péguy
- Written by: Alfred Gragnon
- Starring: Fernand Mailly; Gina Manès; Jean Brochard
- Cinematography: Nicolas Hayer
- Music by: Jane Bos
- Release date: 1936
- Running time: 87 minutes
- Country: France
- Language: French

The Mysterious Lady (French: La mystérieuse lady) is a 1936 French drama film directed by Robert Péguy and starring Fernand Mailly, Gina Manès and Jean Brochard.

== Cast ==
- Fernand Mailly as Le colonel Leroy
- Gina Manès as Lady Leroy
- Jean Brochard
- Fernand Fabre as L'agent secret
- Simone Renant as La secrétaire

== Bibliography ==
- Crisp, Colin. Genre, Myth and Convention in the French Cinema, 1929-1939. Indiana University Press, 2002.
