= Charley's Aunt (1936 film) =

1936 film directed by Pierre Colombier

- Directed by: Pierre Colombier
- Written by: Arnold Lippschitz; René Pujol
- Based on: Charley's Aunt by Brandon Thomas
- Produced by: Jack Forrester; Adolphe Osso; André Parant
- Starring: Lucien Baroux; Olly von Flint; Monique Rolland
- Cinematography: Charles Bauer; Robert Lefebvre
- Music by: Pierre Chagnon; Fred Pearly; Vincent Scotto
- Production company: Les Films E.F.
- Distributed by: Les Films Fernand Rivers
- Release date: 17 January 1936
- Running time: 85 minutes
- Country: France
- Language: French

Charley's Aunt (French: La marraine de Charley) is a 1936 French comedy film directed by Pierre Colombier and starring Lucien Baroux, Olly von Flint and Monique Rolland. It is based on the 1892 play Charley's Aunt by Brandon Thomas. The film's sets were designed by the art director Jacques Colombier.

== Synopsis ==
A young man invites his fiancee and her father to visit him at his lodgings at Oxford University. He expects them to be chaperoned by his aunt arriving from Brazil but when she is delayed he gers his servant to impersonate her.

== Cast ==
- Lucien Baroux as William
- Olly von Flint as Olly Parker
- Monique Rolland as Kitty Spettik
- Julien Carette as Spettik
- Claude Lehmann as Charley
- Georges Mauloy as Le colonel
- Robert Goupil as Pitt
- George Rigaud as Jack
- Marguerite Moreno as Lucie d'Alvadorez
- Léna Darthès as Betty
- Jean Dax as L'huissier
- Guy Derlan as Le secrétaire
- Hubert as Un rédacteur
- Max Lerel as Un rédacteur

== Bibliography ==
- Bessy, Maurice & Chirat, Raymond. Histoire du cinéma français: 1935-1939. Pygmalion, 1986.
- Crisp, Colin. Genre, Myth and Convention in the French Cinema, 1929-1939. Indiana University Press, 2002.
- Goble, Alan. The Complete Index to Literary Sources in Film. Walter de Gruyter, 1999.
- Rège, Philippe. Encyclopedia of French Film Directors, Volume 1. Scarecrow Press, 2009.
