= Fernand Mailly =

French actor (1873–?)

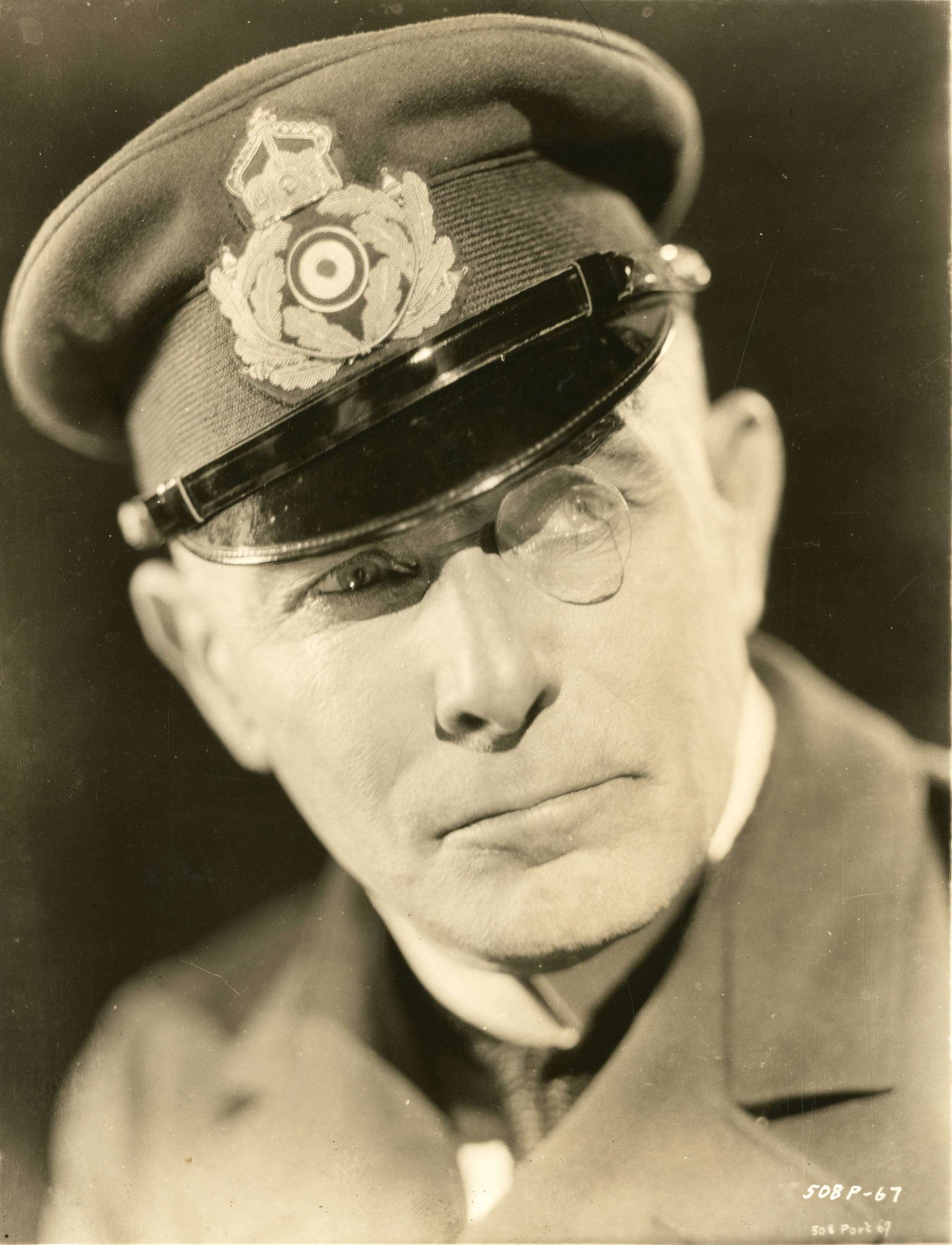
Mailly in 1926

Fernand Mailly (born Fernand Jean-Paul Anne in Le Havre, Seine-Maritime, France; 26 February 1873) was a French actor.

== Selected filmography ==
- Brigadier Gerard (1915)
- Le traquenard (1915)
- The Empire of Diamonds (1920)
- The Agony of the Eagles (1922)
- Le Miracle des loups (1924)
- Mare Nostrum (1926)
- Education of a Prince (1927)
- André Cornélis (1927)
- Saint Joan the Maid (1929)
- Temptation (1929)
- Checkmate (1931)
- Imperial Violets (1932)
- Number 33 (1933)
- The Mysterious Lady (1936)
- Inspector Grey (1936)
- Grey's Thirteenth Investigation (1937)
- The Patriot (1938)
