= René Pujol =

French screenwriter, film director and librettist

- Born: Amédée Ferdinand Pujol; 18 August 1887; Bordeaux, France
- Died: 21 January 1942 (aged 54); Paris, France
- Occupations: Screenwriter, film director and librettist

Amédée Ferdinand René Pujol (21 August 1887 - 21 January 1942) was a French screenwriter, film director, and librettist.

== Partial list of publications ==
- 1919 : L'Homme qui gagne, Éditions françaises illustrées
- 1928 : S.O.S., Librairie des Champs-Élysées, Le Masque (collection) (No.27)
- 1929 : Le Détective bizarre, Fayard
- 1929 : L'Héritage de Gengis Khan, Fayard
- 1929 : Le Soleil noir, Lecture pour tous
- 1931 : La Planète invisible, Sciences et Voyages
- 1931 : Au Temps des brumes, Sciences et Voyages
- 1932 : La Chasse aux chimères, éditions des Portiques
- 1933 : Le Resquilleur sentimental, Tallandier
- 1933 : Lévy-Durand, banquier, Tallandier
- 1933 : Le Mystère de la flèche d'argent, Librairie contemporaine
- 1934 : Amédée Pifle, reporter, éditions des Portiques
- 1935 : La Résurrection de M. Corme, éditions de France, coll. À ne pas lire la nuit

== Filmography ==
=== Director ===
- 1931 : Everybody Wins
- 1933 : Tout pour rien
- 1934 : The Typist Gets Married
- 1936 : Passé à vendre
- 1936 : J'arrose mes galons
- 1936 : Bach the Detective
- 1937 : Un de la Canebière (film)
- 1937 : Trois artilleurs au pensionnat
- 1937 : Le Plus Beau Gosse de France
- 1937 : La Griffe du hasard
- 1937 : La Peau d'un autre (film)
- 1938 : Trois artilleurs en vadrouille
- 1938 : Deux de la réserve
- 1938 : Titin des Martigues
- 1938 : That's Sport
- 1938 : Les Rois de la flotte
- 1939 : Les Gangsters du château d'If
- 1939 : My Aunt the Dictator
- 1940 : Faut ce qu'il faut (Monsieur Bibi)

=== Screenwriter, dialoguist ===
- 1927 : 600 000 francs par mois
- 1930 : Le Roi des resquilleurs
- 1931 : All That's Not Worth Love
- 1931 : J'ai quelque chose à vous dire
- 1931 : Everybody Wins
- 1931 : Make a Living
- 1931 : His Highness Love
- 1931 : Le Roi du cirage by Pierre Colombier
- 1931 : La Bande à Bouboule by Léon Mathot
- 1932 : Antoinette
- 1933 : La Margoton du bataillon
- 1933 : La Pouponnière
- 1933 : The Two Orphans de Maurice Tourneur
- 1933 : Une idée folle
- 1933 : Toto by Jacques Tourneur
- 1933 : Mirages de Paris by Fedor Ozep (adaptation and dialogues)
- 1933 : Theodore and Company by Pierre Colombier
- 1933 : Tout pour rien
- 1934 : Y faut s'marier
- 1934 :Sidonie Panache
- 1934 : Une femme chipée
- 1934 : Le Train de 8 heures 47 by Henry Wulschleger (dialogues)
- 1934 : A Man Has Been Stolen
- 1934 : Une nuit de folies
- 1934 : The Typist Gets Married
- 1934 : Bouboule Ier, roi nègre
- 1934 : L'Auberge du petit dragon
- 1934 : Le Père Lampion
- 1935 : Voyage d'agrément
- 1935 : If I Were Boss by Richard Pottier (dialogues with Jacques Prévert)
- 1935 : Honeymoon, by Pierre-Jean Ducis
- 1935 : His Excellency Antonin by Charles-Félix Tavano
- 1935 : Le Billet de mille
- 1935 : Count Obligado
- 1935 : Monsieur Sans-Gêne
- 1935 : The Mascot
- 1935 : Et moi, j'te dis qu'elle t'a fait de l'œil by Jack Forrester
- 1935 : Juanita
- 1935 : Fanfare of Love
- 1935 : Happy Arenas
- 1936 : Marinella by Pierre Caron
- 1936 : Coup de vent (film)
- 1936 : Une fille à papa
- 1936: Charley's Aunt
- 1936 : One Rainy Afternoon, by Rowland V. Lee
- 1936 : Passé à vendre
- 1937 : The Blue Mouse
- 1937 : Les Dégourdis de la 11e by Christian-Jaque (script with Jean Aurenche)
- 1937 : La Griffe du hasard
- 1937 : La Caserne en folie
- 1937 : The Secrets of the Red Sea by Richard Pottier
- 1938 : Le Plus Beau Gosse de France
- 1938 : Tricoche et Cacolet
- 1938 : Lights of Paris by Richard Pottier (script with Richard Liebmann)
- 1938 :The Tamer by Pierre Colombier
- 1939 : Les Gangsters du château d'If
- 1940 : Bécassine
- 1941 : Fromont jeune et Risler aîné
- 1942 : Cartacalha, reine des gitans
- 1942 : No Love Allowed
- 1945 : Le Roi des resquilleurs

=== Composer ===
- 1931 : Atout Cœur by Henry Roussel
- 1931 : Après l'amour by Léonce Perret
- 1931 : La Bande à Bouboule by Léon Mathot

== Theater and operettas ==
- 1928 : Yes by Pierre Soulaine, Albert Willemetz, Robert Bousquet, René Pujol, music Maurice Yvain, Théâtre des Capucines
- 1929 : Vive Leroy , opérette by Henri Géroule and René Pujol, music Fred Pearly and Pierre Chagnon, directed by Harry Baur, Théâtre des Capucines
- 1929 : Minouche
- 1930 : Bégonia
- 1930 : Six filles à marier
- 1930 : Miami
- 1932 : La Pouponnière
- 1935 : Une nuit, 3 acts comedy by René Pujol, Théâtre Daunou
- 1937 : La Margoton du bataillon
- 1939 : Destination inconnue
- 1940 : Ce coquin de soleil, operette by Raymond Vincy, directed by René Pujol, Théâtre des Célestins
