= Inspector Grey =

1936 film

- Directed by: Maurice de Canonge
- Written by: Maurice de Canonge
- Based on: Inspector Grey by Alfred Gragnon
- Starring: Maurice Lagrenée; Jean Brochard; Colette Broïdo
- Cinematography: André Dantan
- Production company: Société des Films d'Aventures
- Release date: 22 May 1936
- Running time: 84 minutes
- Country: France
- Language: French

Inspector Grey (French: Inspecteur Grey) is a 1936 French crime film directed by Maurice de Canonge and starring Maurice Lagrenée, Jean Brochard and Colette Broïdo. The film's sets were designed by the art director Émile Duquesne. It was based on a novel by Alfred Gragnon. It was followed by three sequels beginning with L'Empreinte rouge in 1937.

== Cast ==
- Maurice Lagrenée as L'inspecteur Grey
- Raymond Maurel as Dupré
- Colette Broïdo as Hélène
- Paule Dagrève as Monique Jeffries
- Jean Brochard as L'inspecteur Poussin
- Gine Elly as La fille Rachaud
- Victor Grail as Victor
- Fernand Mailly as Le commissaire
- Alexandre Mihalesco as Brown
- Nicole Ray as Armandine
- Sylvaine as Victoire

== Bibliography ==
- Bessy, Maurice & Chirat, Raymond. Histoire du cinéma français: 1935-1939. Pygmalion, 1986.
- Crisp, Colin. Genre, Myth and Convention in the French Cinema, 1929-1939. Indiana University Press, 2002.
- Goble, Alan. The Complete Index to Literary Sources in Film. Walter de Gruyter, 1999.
- Rège, Philippe. Encyclopedia of French Film Directors, Volume 1. Scarecrow Press, 2009.
