= Excursion Train =

1936 film

- Directed by: Léo Joannon
- Written by: Lucien-Charles Marsoudet; Yves Mirande
- Starring: Frédéric Duvallès; José Noguéro; Germaine Roger
- Cinematography: Robert Lefebvre; Georges Lucas
- Edited by: Jacques Grassi
- Music by: Casimir Oberfeld
- Production company: Marfor
- Distributed by: Radio Cinéma; Standing Films
- Release date: 14 March 1936
- Running time: 90 minutes
- Country: France
- Language: French

Excursion Train (French: Train de plaisir) is a 1936 French romantic comedy film directed by Léo Joannon and starring Frédéric Duvallès, José Noguéro and Germaine Roger. The film's sets were designed by the art director Laurent Routier.

== Synopsis ==
The manager of a floor at a Paris department store plans to go away to the sea with one of the saleswoman. He tells his wife that he needs to catch the excursion train in order to attend the funeral of his aunt.

== Cast ==
- Frédéric Duvallès as Prosper Biscoton
- José Noguéro as Verdurin
- Germaine Roger as Marguerite
- Raymond Cordy as Pigeonnet
- Louis Baron fils as Me Picquois
- Paul Clerget as Le chef de train
- Emile Saulieu
- Georges Bever as Porteur
- Robert Seller as Un voyageur
- Paul Asselin
- Paul Grail as Un voyageur
- Paul Demange as Un employé
- Félix Oudart as Inspecteur Plouf
- Saturnin Fabre as M. Bring
- Madeleine Guitty as Tante Ursule
- Jeanne Fusier-Gir as Mlle Culpas
- Pauline Carton as La concierge
- Germaine Brière as Une voyageuse
- Jeanne Rémy as Mme Bring
- Marcelle Yrven as Mme Pigeonnet
- Yvonne Yma as La télégraphiste
- Junie Astor as La fleuriste
- Marguerite Moreno as Mme Biscoton
- Paul Barge

== Bibliography ==
- Dayna Oscherwitz & MaryEllen Higgins. The A to Z of French Cinema. Scarecrow Press, 2009.
