= The Blue Mouse (1936 film) =

1936 film

- Directed by: Pierre-Jean Ducis
- Written by: René Pujol
- Produced by: Raoul Ploquin; Pierre Brauer
- Starring: Henri Garat; Félix Oudart; Jeanne Aubert
- Cinematography: Willy Winterstein
- Music by: Werner Eisbrenner
- Production company: UFA
- Distributed by: L'Alliance Cinématographique Européenne
- Release date: 12 June 1936
- Running time: 100 minutes
- Country: France
- Language: French

The Blue Mouse (French: La souris bleue) is a 1936 French romantic comedy film directed by Pierre-Jean Ducis and starring Henri Garat, Félix Oudart and Jeanne Aubert. It was produced and distributed by the French subsidiary of Germany's UFA. Shooting took place at the Babelsberg Studios in Berlin. The film's sets were designed by the art director Carl Ludwig Kirmse.

== Cast ==
- Henri Garat as René Baron
- Félix Oudart as Leboudier
- Jeanne Aubert as Nénette
- Mireille Perrey as Madame Rigaud
- Monique Rolland as Yvonne
- Alfred Pizella as Mathieu, l'interprète
- Marcelle Praince as Madame Leboudier
- Betty Rowe as Miss Petitfair
- Robert Arnoux as Rigaud
- Charles Fallot as Monsieur Martin

== Bibliography ==
- Bessy, Maurice & Chirat, Raymond. Histoire du cinéma français: encyclopédie des films, Volume 2. Pygmalion, 1986.
- Bock, Hans-Michael & Töteberg, Michael. Das Ufa-Buch. Zweitausendeins, 1992.
- Crisp, Colin. Genre, Myth and Convention in the French Cinema, 1929-1939. Indiana University Press, 2002.
- Rège, Philippe. Encyclopedia of French Film Directors, Volume 1. Scarecrow Press, 2009.
