= Ginette Leclerc =

French actress (1912–1992)

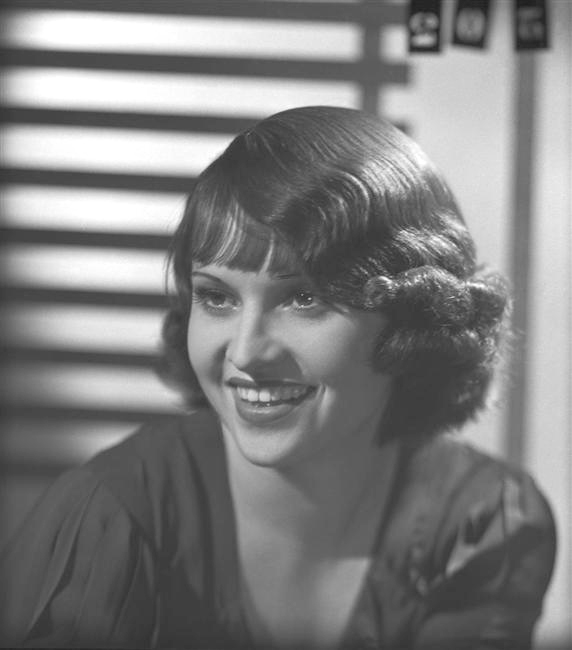
- Leclerc in 1939
- Born: Geneviève Lucie Menut; 9 February 1912; Paris, Ile-de-France, France
- Died: 2 January 1992 (aged 79); Paris, France
- Occupation: Actress
- Years active: 1932–1981
- Spouse(s): Lucien Gallas (m. 19??)

Ginette Leclerc (born Geneviève Lucie Menut; 9 February 1912 – 2 January 1992) was a French film actress. She appeared in nearly 90 films between 1932 and 1978. Her last TV appearance was in 1981. She was born in Ile-de-France, France and died in Paris. She was married to the actor Lucien Gallas. She is possibly best-remembered for her roles in such films as Le Corbeau (1943), The Baker's Wife (1938), Cab Number 13 (1948), and Tropic of Cancer (1970).

== Selected filmography ==
- L'enfant du miracle (1932)
- Pomme d'amour (1932)
- La dame de chez Maxim's (1933)
- The Star of Valencia (1933) – Une girl
- Toto (1933) – La petite femme (uncredited)
- The Old Devil (1933) – (uncredited)
- Goodbye, Beautiful Days (1933) – Marietta
- Ciboulette (1933) – Une cocotte
- Les surprises du sleeping (1933)
- Minuit, place Pigalle (1934) – Irma
- Hotel Free Exchange (1934) – Victoire
- Dédé (1935) – Une des deux poules
- Compartiment de dames seules (1935) – Isabelle, des 'Folies Bergère'
- Gangster malgré lui (1935)
- L'heureuse aventure (1935)
- Paris Camargue (1935) – Margot, une pensionnaire
- Et moi, j'te dis qu'elle t'a fait de l'oeil (1935) – Francine
- L'école des cocottes (1935) – (uncredited)
- Fanfare of Love (1935)
- Le commissaire est bon enfant, le gendarme est sans pitié (1935) – Le flirt de Breloc
- Les gaîtés de la finance (1936) – Fanny
- La Peur (1936)
- Oeil de lynx, détective (1936) – Janine
- Passé à vendre (1936)
- Bach the Detective (1936) – Zita
- Jacques and Jacotte (1936)
- La peau d'un autre (1937) – Zézette
- La loupiote (1937) – Thérèse – La Sauterelle
- The Man from Nowhere (1937) – Romilda Pescatore Pascal
- La pocharde (1937)
- Les dégourdis de la 11ème (1937) – Nina Vermillon
- Le choc en retour (1937)
- The Call of Life (1937) – Marcelle
- Mon deputé et sa femme (1937) – Florine
- The Fraudster (1937) – Viviane
- Le gagnant (1937)
- La femme du boulanger (1938) – Aurélie
- Prison sans barreaux (1938) – Renée
- Tricoche and Cacolet (1938) – Fanny de Saint-Origan dite Fanny Bombance
- The Baker's Wife (1938) – Aurélie Castanier
- The Gutter (1938) – Ginette
- Metropolitan (1939) – Viviane
- Coups de feu (1939) – Lisa
- Louise (1939) – Lucienne
- Threats (1940) – Ginette
- L'empreinte du Dieu (1940) – Fanny
- The Chain Breaker (1941) – Graziella
- Ce n'est pas moi (1941) – Lulu
- Fever (1942) – Rose
- Private Life (1942) – Ginette
- The Man Who Played with Fire (1942) – Clara
- La grande marnière (1943) – Rose
- Mistral (1943) – Stella
- The Exile's Song (1943) – Dolorès
- Le val d'enfer (1943) – Marthe
- Le Corbeau (1943) – Denise Saillens
- Ils étaient cinq permissionnaires (1945) – Georgette
- The Last Penny (1946) – Marcelle Levasseur
- Nuit sans fin (1947) – Rina
- Lawless Roads (1947) – Inès
- Une belle garce (1947) – Raymonde
- Cab Number 13 (1948) – Claudia – une femme machiavélique (segments "Delitto" & "Castigo")
- Passeurs d'or (1948) – Josée
- Jo la Romance (1949) – Martine
- Les eaux troubles (1949) – Augusta
- Millionaires for One Day (1949) – Greta Schmidt
- The Inn of Sin (1950) – Gilberte / Laura
- A Man Walks in the City (1950) – Madeleine
- The Adventurers of the Air (1950) – Béatrice Webb
- Le Plaisir (1952) – Madame Flora dite Balançoire (segment "La Maison Tellier")
- The House on the Dune (1952) – Germaine
- Le gang des pianos à bretelles (1953) – Ginette
- The Lovers of Lisbon (1954) – Maria
- Gas-Oil (1955) – Mme Scoppo
- The Band of Honest Men (1956) – (uncredited)
- Delincuentes (1957) – Mercedes
- Du sang sous le chapiteau (1957) – La directrice du cirque
- Easiest Profession (1957) – Zozotte
- Double Deception (1960) – Odette
- Le cave se rebiffe (1961) – Léa Lepicard
- Le Chant du monde (1965) – Gina, la vieille
- Joë Caligula – Du suif chez les dabes (1969) – Ariane
- Goto, Island of Love (1968) – Gonasta
- Le grand cérémonial (1969) – La mère
- Tropic of Cancer (1970) – Madame Hamilton
- The Ball of Count Orgel (1970) – Hortense d'Austerlitz
- Popsy Pop (1971) – Brunette with Fan
- Le drapeau noir flotte sur la marmite (1971) – Marie-Ange Ploubaz
- Five Leaf Clover (1972) – L'épicière
- Le Rempart des béguines (1972) – Nina
- Les volets clos (1973) – Félicie
- Elle court, elle court la banlieue (1973) – Madame Blin
- La belle affaire (1973) – Mme Max
- Par ici la monnaie (1974) – Madame Cerise
- En grandes pompes (1974) – La mère de Marcel
- Chobizenesse (1975) – L'habilleuse
- Spermula (1976) – Gromana
- La barricade du Point du Jour (1978) – Mme Bouroche
