= Bernard Natan =

French-Romanian film director, actor, and Holocaust victim

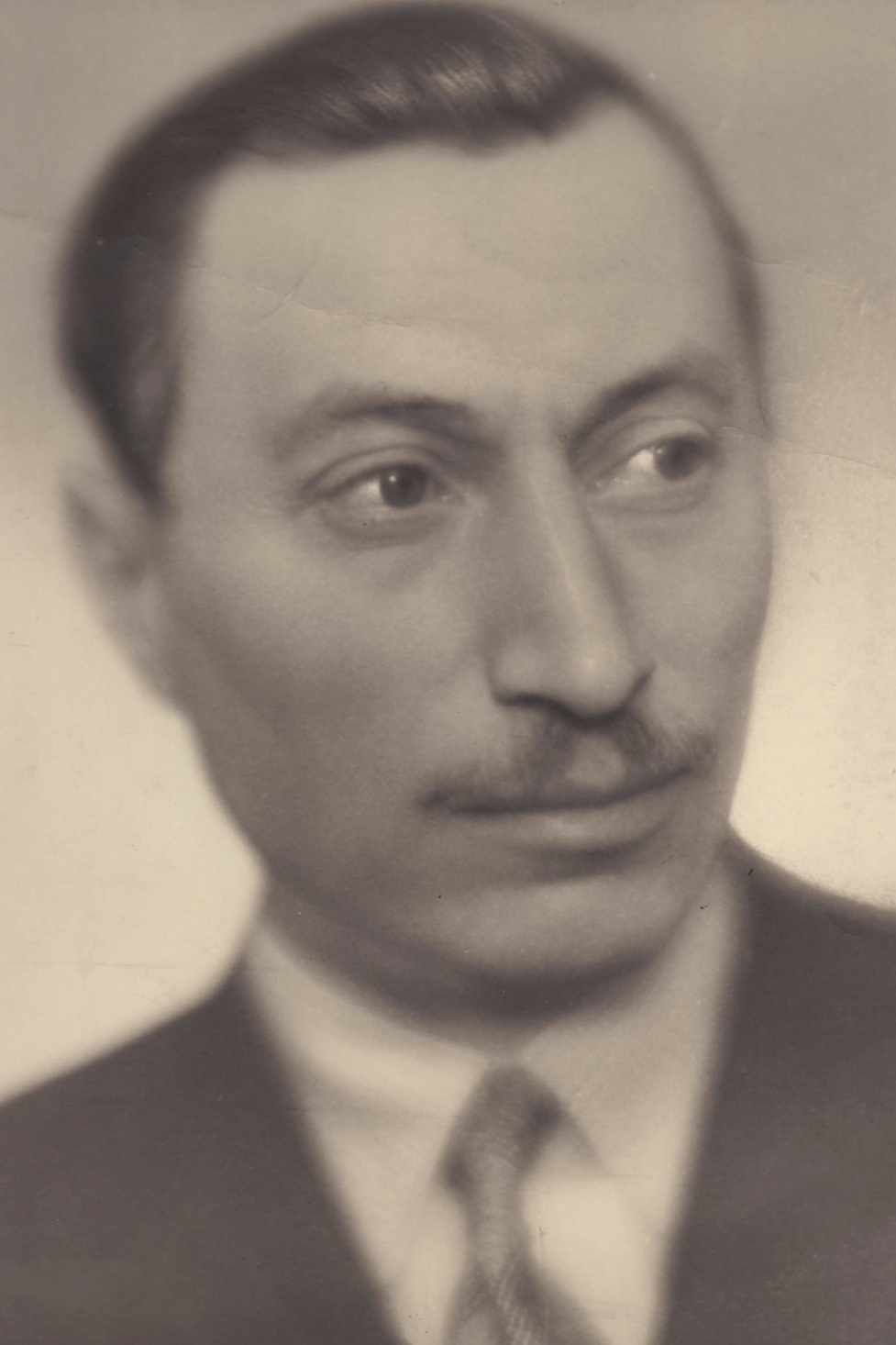
- Bernard Natan; Photo by Studio Lorelle
- Born: Natan Tannenzaft or Natan Tanenzapf; 14 July 1886; Iași, Kingdom of Romania
- Died: 1942–1943 (aged 56–57); Auschwitz-Birkenau, German-occupied Poland
- Cause of death: Execution?

Bernard Natan (born Natan Tannenzaft; 14 July 1886 – 1942 or 1943) was a French-Romanian film entrepreneur, director and actor of the 1920s and 1930s.

Natan worked in cinema from a young age, working his way up from projectionist and chemist to cinematographer and producer. He eventually acquired the largest French motion picture studio, Pathé, in 1929, just prior to the Great Depression. Pathé collapsed in 1935, and Natan was the subject of false and antisemitic accusations of fraud, and was ultimately convicted and imprisoned by French authorities. Natan was deported to Auschwitz concentration camp in September 1942, where he was murdered. However, Natan laid the foundation for the modern film industry in France and helped revolutionize film technology around the world.

== Personal life ==
Natan was born Natan Tannenzaft (possibly Tanenzapf) to Jewish parents in Iași, Romania in 1886. He moved to France in the early 1900s, where he held a number of jobs in cinema. In 1909 he married and subsequently had 2 children. Despite being a Romanian, he volunteered to fight for France at the outset of World War I. He was cited twice, wounded, and awarded the Croix de Guerre, and was demobilized in October 1918, holding the rank of sergeant.

In 1921 he became a French citizen, and at some point changed his name to "Bernard Natan". His younger brother Émile Natan also moved to France and became a film producer.

== Mainstream film career ==
Natan worked as a projectionist, film lab chemist, titles designer, cinematographer and producer during his early years in Paris. He was a publicity stringer for Paramount Pictures during the early 1920s. But by 1929, Natan's Rapid Film had become a major film producer and distributor. His reputation was such that in 1924 Natan became a member of the executive committee of the Cinematographic Employers' Federation. By 1926, his film laboratory was highly regarded, he had established a marketing firm, and he built two sound stages. Natan was also a film producer, helping finance and produce motion pictures at other studios.

=== Takeover of Pathé ===
In late February 1929, Bernard Natan acquired the production and exhibition businesses of Pathé, then the largest French motion picture company. He agreed to merge his own studio, Rapid Film (then worth 25 million francs), with Pathé in exchange for 50 million francs in shares. The remaining shares were purchased with funding from a consortium of banks, bonds (to be paid with income from Pathé), and a 10 percent ownership in Pathé by the banks. After the merger, Natan renamed the company Pathé-Natan (sometimes also credited as Pathé-Cinéma).

Pathe was already in substantial financial trouble when Natan took control. Studio founder Charles Pathé had been selling assets for several years to boost investor value and keep the studio's cash flow healthy. The company's founder had even sold Pathé's name and "rooster" trademark to other companies in return for a mere 2 percent of revenues generated by them. Natan had the bad luck to take charge of the studio just as the Great Depression convulsed the French economy.

Natan attempted to steady Pathé's finances and implement modern film industry practices at the studio. Natan acquired another film studio, Société des Cinéromans, from Arthur Bernède and Gaston Leroux, which enabled Pathé to expand into projector and electronics manufacturing. He also bought the Fornier chain of motion picture theaters and rapidly expanded the chain's nationwide presence. The French press, however, attacked Natan mercilessly for his stewardship of Pathé. Many of these attacks were antisemitic and contained veiled homophobic allusions to Natan's supposed sexuality.

Pathé-Natan did well under Natan's guidance. Between 1930 and 1935, despite the world economic crisis, the company made 100 million francs in profits and produced and released more than 60 feature films (just as many films as major American studios produced at the time). He resumed production of the newsreel Pathé News, which had not been produced since 1927.

Natan also invested heavily in research and development to expand Pathé's film business. In 1929, he pushed Pathé into sound film. In September, the studio produced its first sound feature film, Les trois masques and its first sound newsreel a month later. Natan also launched two new cinema-related magazines, Pathé-Revue and Actualités Féminines, to help market Pathé's films and build consumer demand for cinema. Under Natan, Pathé also funded the research of Henri Chrétien, who developed the anamorphic lens (a technology which later led to the creation of CinemaScope and other widescreen film formats common today).

Natan expanded Pathé's business interests into communications industries other than film. In November 1929, Natan established France's first television company, Télévision-Baird-Natan. A year later, he purchased a radio station in Paris and formed a holding company (Radio-Natan-Vitus) to run what would become a burgeoning radio empire.

=== Collapse of Pathé and imprisonment ===
In 1930, in order to finance the company's continued expansion, Pathé's board of directors (which still included Charles Pathé) voted to issue shares worth 105 million francs. But with the depression deepening in France, only 50 percent of the shares were purchased. One of the investor banks collapsed due to financial difficulties unrelated to Pathé's problems, and Pathé was forced to follow through with the purchase of several movie theater chains it no longer could afford to buy. Although the company continued to make a profit (as noted above) for a time, the acquisitions meant they lost more money than it could bring in.

In 1935, a French commercial court began investigating Pathé's accounts. By 1936, it was declared bankrupt and Natan was dismissed. French authorities pursued charges of fraud against Natan, including financing the purchase of the company without any collateral, of bilking investors by establishing fictitious shell corporations, and financial mismanagement. He was also accused of hiding his Romanian and Jewish heritage by changing his name. Charles Pathé turned against him, claiming to be his victim.

In 1938, Natan was arrested and imprisoned, never to regain his freedom. In 1939, he was indicted and sentenced to 4 years in jail. This meant he was in prison when France fell to the Nazis, while other Jewish filmmakers were able to flee the country or go into hiding. A second indictment was brought in 1941, and he was convicted again shortly thereafter. His French citizenship was taken away, which required special legal manoeuvres by the state, since he had been naturalized as a result of his World War I military service and there were no existing legal means to render him stateless.

== Adult film controversy ==
In 1911, Natan and colleagues were convicted of making erotic films, he was jailed for a short time and fined 1,000 francs but due to his exceptional record fighting in World War I this was later removed from his record.

Some sources have claimed that Natan's career in pornography did not end there. Joseph Slade suggests that Natan may have directed at least one hardcore pornographic film in Romania and produced and acted in at least 20 hardcore heterosexual and bisexual films between 1920 and 1927. Slade wrote that nearly all French pornographic films from this period which include bisexual and homosexual content were produced by Natan. The same source states that Natan himself was bisexual, and engaged in intercourse in Le Ménage moderne de Madame Butterfly (1920) and La Maîtresse du Capitaine de Meydeux (1924). Furthermore, Slade claimed that he introduced masochism into French pornographic film.

Slade's claims are disputed by the historians of the French organization "Les Indépendants du Premier Siècle", who argue that the various actors in question are not Natan and that accusations at Natan's trial and in Paris Match connecting him to the adult film industry were false. Natan, a 2013 documentary film, compares stills from the adult films attributed to Natan with official headshots and shows that several pornographic actors have been mistaken for Natan but are not him. Joseph Slade now admits there is room for doubt over whether Natan worked in pornography at any time after 1910.

== Death ==
World War II broke out while Natan was in prison awaiting trial, and Nazi Germany conquered France. After Natan's release from prison, the French government handed him over to the occupying German authorities. He was transferred from prison in September 1942 to the camp at Drancy, and shortly afterwards deported to the Auschwitz concentration camp on 25 September 1942, where it is believed he was murdered in 1942 or 1943.

== Importance to the film industry ==
Bernard Natan's importance to the French film industry should not be underestimated. He pioneered vertical integration in the French film industry, and adopted the "American model" of film-making and distribution, which provided the underpinning of the French film industry into the 21st century. He also brought television to France, and established the first French radio and television holding companies. Pathé survived into the 1980s largely on revenues generated by the companies purchased and integrated by Natan.

Under Natan's leadership, the anamorphic film camera lens was developed. The anamorphic lens was not only a major advance in film technology, but helped Hollywood survive during the early years of television.

Before 2014 there was no public acknowledgement of Natan at La Fémis, the French national film school, despite it having moved into one of his former studios in 1999. A plaque commemorating his work, and his murder in Auschwitz, was unveiled in December 2014.

== Bibliography ==
- O'Brien, Charles. Cinema's Conversion to Sound: Technology and Film Style in France and the U.S. Bloomington, Ind.: Indiana University Press, 2005.
- Rossel-Kirschen, André and Willems, Gilles. "Bernard Natan à la direction de Pathé-Cinéma." 1895. 21 (December 1996).
