= Pierre Colombier =

French screenwriter and film director

Pierre Colombier (1896–1958) was a French screenwriter and film director.

== Selected filmography ==
Director

- Paris in Five Days (1926)
- The Marriage of Rosine (1926)
- Dolly (1929)
- His Best Client (1932)
- One Night's Song (1933)
- Charlemagne (1933)
- Theodore and Company (1933)
- School for Coquettes (1935)
- Charley's Aunt (1936)
- The King (1936)
- The Club of Aristocrats (1937)
- Balthazar (1937)
- Ignace (1937)
- The Kings of Sport (1937)
- The Tamer (1938)
- Tricoche and Cacolet (1938)
- Latin Quarter (1939)
