= My Priest Among the Rich =

My Priest Among the Rich (French: Mon curé chez les riches) may refer to:

- My Priest Among the Rich (novel), a 1923 novel by Clément Vautel
- My Priest Among the Rich (1925 film), a French silent film directed by Émile-Bernard Donatien
- My Priest Among the Rich (1932 film), a French film directed by Émile-Bernard Donatien
- My Priest Among the Rich (1938 film), a French film directed by Jean Boyer
- My Priest Among the Rich (1952 film), a French film directed by Henri Diamant-Berger

== See also ==
- My Priest Among the Poor, a 1956 French film sequel directed by Henri Diamant-Berger
