= Yves Deniaud (actor) =

French actor (1901–1959)

Yves Hyacinthe Deniaud (December 6, 1901 – December 7, 1959) was a French comic actor and musical comedian.

Born in Paris, Deniaud died of cancer in Vésinet, in 1959 the day after his birthday.

== Selected filmography ==
- Women's Prison (1938)
- People Who Travel (1938)
- The Gutter (1938)
- Coral Reefs (1939)
- Latin Quarter (1939)
- Midnight Tradition (1939)
- Radio Surprises (1940)
- The Mondesir Heir (1940)
- Tobias Is an Angel (1940)
- False Alarm (1940)
- Love Letters (1942)
- The Benefactor (1942)
- Goodbye Leonard (1943)
- A Woman in the Night (1943)
- Domino (1943)
- Night Shift (1944)
- Florence Is Crazy (1944)
- Fantômas (1946)
- The Ideal Couple (1946)
- Jericho (1946)
- Lessons in Conduct (1946)
- Not So Stupid (1946)
- Four Knaves (1947)
- The Idol (1948)
- The Cupboard Was Bare (1948)
- Barry (1949)
- The Red Signal (1949)
- The Lovers Of Verona (1949)
- Monseigneur (1949)
- Millionaires for One Day (1949)
- The Heroic Monsieur Boniface (1949)
- The Little Zouave (1950)
- A Man Walks in the City (1950)
- Women Are Crazy (1950)
- Dr. Knock (1951)
- The King of Camelots (1951)
- The Sleepwalker (1951)
- Monsieur Leguignon, Signalman (1952)
- The Smugglers' Banquet (1952)
- My Priest Among the Rich (1952)
- The Case Against X (1952)
- The Lottery of Happiness (1953)
- The Porter from Maxim's (1953)
- Leguignon the Healer (1954)
- My Priest Among the Poor (1956)

== Filmography ==
- 1936: Le Crime de Monsieur Lange (dir. Jean Renoir) (uncredited)
- 1936: Rigolboche (dir. Christian-Jacque) as Le caissier du Gloria (uncredited)
- 1937: Drôle de drame (dir. Marcel Carné) as Policeman
- 1938: Je chante (dir. Christian Stengel) as The butcher
- 1938: Prisons de femmes (dir. Maurice Lehmann, Claude Autant-Lara) as Victor
- 1938: Le Ruisseau (dir. Maurice Lehmann et Claude Autant-Lara) (uncredited)
- 1938: Les Gens du voyage (dir. Jacques Feyder) as Le bonimenteur
- 1939: Angélica (dir. Jean Choux)
- 1939: Le Récif de corail (dir. Maurice Gleize) as The seller in the bazaar
- 1939: Le Déserteur (dir. Léonide Moguy)
- 1939: La Tradition de minuit (dir. Roger Richebé) as Le bonimenteur (uncredited)
- 1939: Latin Quarter (dir. Pierre Colombier, Christian Chamborant, Alexander Esway) as Napoléon
- 1939: Dernière Jeunesse (dir. Jeff Musso) as Reynaud
- 1940: L'Héritier des Mondésir (dir. Albert Valentin) as Gaston
- 1940: Les Surprises de la radio (dir. Marcel Aboulker) as the first duelist
- 1940: Tobie est un ange (dir. Yves Allégret)
- 1942: Signé illisible (dir. Christian Chamborant) as Tatave
- 1942: L'Appel du bled (dir. Maurice Gleize) as The Arabic seller
- 1942: Le Bienfaiteur (dir. Henri Decoin) as Vinchon
- 1942: Lettres d'amour (dir. Claude Autant-Lara) as The Mayor
- 1943: Une femme dans la nuit (dir. Edmond T. Gréville) as Maxime
- 1943: Le Comte de Monte-Cristo "Edmond Dantès" (dir. Robert Vernay) as Pénelan
- 1943: Départ à zéro (dir. Maurice Cloche) as Jules
- 1943: Les Deux Timides (dir. Yves Allégret) as Le commis-voyageur
- 1943: A la belle frégate (dir. Albert Valentin) as Raoul
- 1943: Des jeunes filles dans la nuit (dir. René Le Hénaff) as The client of the visionary
- 1943: Domino (dir. Roger Richebé) as Mirandole
- 1943: Adieu Léonard (dir. Pierre Prévert) as Leon, The waiter
- 1943: Feu Nicolas (dir. Jean Faurez) as Rigaud
- 1944: Cécile est morte (dir. Maurice Tourneur) as Machepied
- 1944: Service de nuit (dir. Jean Faurez) as Victor
- 1944: La Vie de plaisir (dir. Albert Valentin) as Gaston
- 1944: Florence est folle (dir. Georges Lacombe) as Bianco
- 1945: Comédiens ambulants (Short, dir. Jean Canolle) as Le presenter
- 1945: Fausse Alerte (tourné en 1940) (dir. Jacques de Baroncelli) as Le peddler
- 1945: L'Extravagante Mission (dir. Henri Calef) as Gilbert, "Patte de velours"
- 1945: La Part de l'ombre (dir. Jean Delannoy) as Auguste
- 1946: Jéricho (dir. Henri Calef) as Robert Detaille
- 1946: Leçon de conduite (dir. Gilles Grangier) as Angelo
- 1946: Le Couple idéal ou "Voyage au pays des loufoques", "Diavolo contre Judex" (dir. Bernard Roland) as Julien
- 1946: La Foire aux chimères (dir. Pierre Chenal) as The intermediary
- 1946: Pas si bête (dir. André Berthomieu) as Antony
- 1947: La Colère des dieux (dir. Carl Lamac) as Truche
- 1947: L'Arche de Noé (dir. Henri Jacques) as Maclou
- 1947: Fantomas (dir. Jean Sacha) as Arthur
- 1947: Carré de valets (dir. André Berthomieu) as Jules
- 1948: L'Idole (dir. Alexander Esway) as Al Simon
- 1948: L'Armoire volante (dir. Carlo Rim) as Martinet
- 1949: Jean de la Lune (dir. Marcel Achard) as Le colonial dans le train (uncredited)
- 1949: Le Signal rouge (dir. Ernst Neubach) as The tramp
- 1949: Fantomas Against Fantomas (dir. Robert Vernay) as L'ordonnateur
- 1949: Les amants de Vérone (dir. André Cayatte) as Ricardo
- 1949: La Bataille du feu ou Les Joyeux Conscrits (dir. Maurice de Canonge) as Sergeant Poirier
- 1949: Barry (dir. Richard Pottier) as Le sergent Brocard, "Lafleur"
- 1949: Barry, moines du Mont Saint-Bernard (version Suisse du film précédent) (dir. Karl Anton et Richard Pottier) as Le sergent Brocard, "Lafleur"
- 1949: L'Héroïque Monsieur Boniface (dir. Maurice Labro) as gangster #1
- 1949: Appel d'Yves Deniaud (Short documentary) (anonyme) as himself
- 1949: On demande un assassin (dir. Ernst Neubach) as Tom
- 1949: Millionnaires d'un jour (dir. André Hunebelle) as Antoine Bergas, the tramp
- 1949: Monseigneur (dir. Roger Richebé) as Bouaffre, le patron serrurier
- 1949: Séraphins et truands (Short, dir. René Sti)
- 1950: Le 84 prend des vacances (dir. Léo Joannon) as Jules Laplanche
- 1950: Au p'tit zouave (dir. Gilles Grangier) as Henri
- 1950: Un homme marche dans la ville (dir. Marcello Pagliero) as Albert
- 1950: Les Femmes sont folles (dir. Gilles Grangier) as Hector Robilleau
- 1951: Le Roi des camelots (dir. André Berthomieu) as Gaston
- 1951: La rose rouge (dir. Marcello Pagliero) as Albert
- 1951: La Peau d'un homme (dir. René Jolivet) as Daniel Mareuil
- 1951: Knock (dir. Guy Lefranc) as Le tambour de ville
- 1951: Boniface somnambule (dir. Maurice Labro) as René, the gangster
- 1951: La Maison Bonnadieu (dir. Carlo Rim) as Mouffe
- 1951: Les Deux Gosses (I due derelitti) (dir. Flavio Calvazara) as Lumaca
- 1952: Le Banquet des fraudeurs (dir. Henri Storck) as Brigadier Achille Van Moll
- 1952: Monsieur Leguignon Lampiste (dir. Maurice Labro) as Diogène Leguignon, lampiste
- 1952: Ouvert contre X (dir. Richard Pottier) as Inspector Bonnardel
- 1952: Mon curé chez les riches (dir. Henri Diamant-Berger) as Abbé Pellegrin
- 1952: La Bergère et le Ramoneur dessin animé (dir. Paul Grimault) as police (voice)
- 1953: La Loterie du bonheur (dir. Jean Gehret) as Léon Lucas
- 1953: Le Chasseur de chez Maxim's (dir. Henri Diamant-Berger) as Julien Pauphilat
- 1953: Autant en emporte le gang (dir. Jacques Moisy et Michel Gast) (voice)
- 1954: L'Étrange Désir de monsieur Bard (dir. Geza Radvanyi) as Antonio, l'ami de M. Bard
- 1954: Si Versailles m'était conté (dir. Sacha Guitry) as The farmer
- 1954: Crainquebille (dir. Ralph Habib) as Crainquebille, marchand des quatre saisons
- 1954: Leguignon guérisseur (dir. Maurice Labro) as Diogène Leguignon
- 1954: Huis clos (dir. Jacqueline Audry) as Le garçon d'étage
- 1955: Fantaisie d'un jour (dir. Pierre Cardinal) as Papa Bénard
- 1955: Les Chiffonniers d'Emmaüs (dir. Robert Darène) as Djibouti
- 1955: Le Couteau sous la gorge (dir. Jacques Séverac) as Commissaire Lucas
- 1955: On déménage le colonel (dir. Maurice Labro) as Roméo
- 1956: Mon curé chez les pauvres (dir. Henri Diamant-Berger) as Abbé Pellegrin
- 1956: Le Colonel est de la revue (dir. Maurice Labro) as Calla, le mari de Cora
- 1957: This Pretty World (dir. Carlo Rim) as Pepito, chef de bande
- 1957: Quand la femme s'en mêle (dir. Yves Allégret) as Bobby
- 1958: Les Copains du dimanche (film qui n'est jamais sorti en salle) (dir. Henri Aisner) as The old workman
- 1958: Why Women Sin (dir. Guy Lefranc) as Parola
- 1958: Sérénade au Texas (dir. Richard Pottier) as Roderick, le saltimbanque
- 1958: Nuits de Pigalle (dir. Georges Jaffe) as Boursier (final film role)

== Television ==
- 1955 : Monsieur Brotonneau by François Gir – Mr Brotonneau
- 1956 : Affaire vous concernant by Claude Loursais
- 1958 : Là-haut by Jean-Paul Carrère
- 1959 : L'Ange de miséricorde by François Gir

== Theatre ==
- 1942 : Colinette by Marcel Achard, mise en scène Pierre Dux, Théâtre de l'Athénée
- 1952 : Madame Filoumé by Eduardo De Filippo, mise en scène Jean Darcante, Théâtre de la Renaissance
- 1957 : La Guerre du sucre by Robert Collon, mise en scène Yves Allégret, Théâtre des Bouffes-Parisiens
