= Jack Pinoteau =

French film director

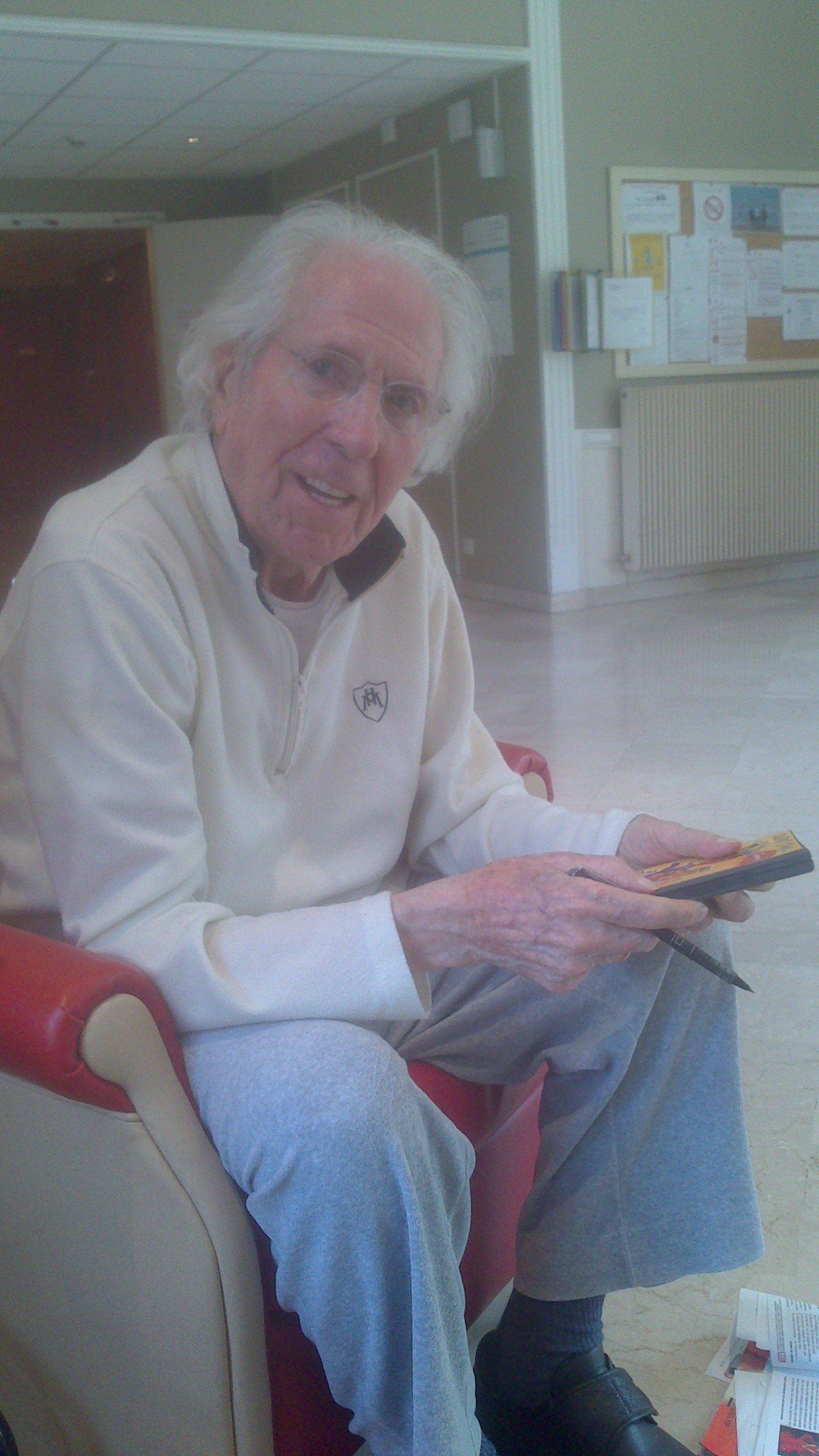
Jack Pinoteau Portrait

Jack Pinoteau (20 September 1923 – 6 April 2017) or Jacques Pinoteau was a French film director born at Clairefontaine-en-Yvelines. A brother of Claude Pinoteau and Arlette Merry, he is mostly known for his direction of the film Le Triporteur, after a novel by René Fallet which made Darry Cowl famous.

Pinoteau died on 6 April 2017, aged 93.

== Filmography ==
=== Cinema ===
==== Film director ====
- 1952 : They Were Five with Jean Carmet, Jean Gaven
- 1954 : The Big Flag with Jean Chevrier, Nicole Courcel
- 1956 : A Friend of the Family with Darry Cowl
- 1957 : The Tricyclist with Darry Cowl
- 1958 : Chéri, fais-moi peur with Darry Cowl
- 1960 : Robinson et le triporteur with Darry Cowl
- 1963 : People in Luck
- 1964 : Les Durs à cuire with Jean Poiret, Michel Serrault and Roger Pierre
- 1965 : Me and the Forty Year Old Man with Dany Saval, Paul Meurisse and Michel Serrault

==== Assistant director ====
- 1948 : Rapide de nuit by Marcel Blistène
- 1949 : Five Red Tulips by Jean Stelli
- 1949 : On n'aime qu'une fois by Jean Stelli
- 1949 : Dernier Amour by Jean Stelli
- 1950 : Minne, l'ingénue libertine by Jacqueline Audry
- 1950 : Les Maîtres nageurs by Henri Lepage
- 1950 : Quai de Grenelle by Emil-Edwin Reinert
- 1951 : The Red Needle by Emil-Edwin Reinert
- 1952 : Plume au vent by Louis Cuny

==== Actor ====
- 1943 : Le Carrefour des enfants perdus by Léo Joannon

=== Television ===
- 1966 : Les Globe-trotters, TV serial with Yves Rénier
- 1967 : S.O.S. Fernand, with Fernandel
