= My Priest Among the Poor =

1956 film

- Directed by: Henri Diamant-Berger
- Written by: Henri Diamant-Berger
- Based on: My Priest Among the Poor by Clément Vautel
- Produced by: Henri Diamant-Berger
- Starring: Yves Deniaud; Raymond Bussières; Arletty
- Cinematography: Léonce-Henri Burel
- Edited by: Yvonne Martin
- Music by: Paul Misraki
- Production company: Le Film d'Art
- Distributed by: Films Roger Richebé
- Release date: 11 April 1956
- Running time: 90 minutes
- Country: France
- Language: French

My Priest Among the Poor (French: Mon curé chez les pauvres) is a 1956 French comedy film directed by Henri Diamant-Berger and starring Yves Deniaud, Raymond Bussières and Arletty. It was shot at the Billancourt Studios in Paris. The film's sets were designed by the art director Roger Briaucourt. It is based on the 1925 novel of the same title by Clément Vautel, and is sequel to the 1952 film My Priest Among the Rich.

== Cast ==
- Yves Deniaud as L'abbé Pellegrin
- Raymond Bussières as La Goupille
- Arletty as Nine
- Robert Arnoux as Emile Cousinet
- Jean Tissier as Edgar de Saint-Preux
- Annette Poivre as Georgette
- Jean Debucourt as Monseigneur Sibué
- Pauline Carton as Valérie
- Pierrette Bruno as La soeur de Georgette
- Geneviève Cluny as Régine
- Clément Harari as Marchot
- Jacques Dufilho as Fernand
- Denise Kerny as Simone
- Hubert de Lapparent as A tenant
- José Artur as Armand le fiancé d'Irèn

== Bibliography ==
- Faulkner, Sally (ed.) Middlebrow Cinema. Routledge, 2016.
- Goble, Alan. The Complete Index to Literary Sources in Film. Walter de Gruyter, 1999.
- Rège, Philippe. Encyclopedia of French Film Directors, Volume 1. Scarecrow Press, 2009.
