= The Girls of La Rochelle =

- Directed by: Bernard Deflandre
- Written by: Bernard Deflandre; Michel Gaillard; Fabienne Tzanck
- Starring: Philippe Lemaire; Raymond Bussières; Geneviève Cluny
- Cinematography: Jacques Klein
- Edited by: Armand Psenny
- Music by: Michel Magne
- Production company: Guépard Productions
- Distributed by: Comacico
- Release date: 22 August 1962
- Running time: 92 minutes
- Country: France
- Language: French

The Girls of La Rochelle (French: Les filles de La Rochelle) is a 1962 French historical comedy film directed by Bernard Deflandre and starring Philippe Lemaire, Raymond Bussières and Geneviève Cluny. It takes its name from a traditional folk song.

== Cast ==
- Philippe Lemaire as Capitaine Timoléon
- Raymond Bussières as Pépin
- Geneviève Cluny as Hildegarde
- Annette Poivre as Isabeau de Bavière
- Noël Roquevert as Charles VI
- Philippe de Broca
- Guy Decomble as Sire Basile
- Max Desrau as L'Écossais
- André Gabriello
- Gustave as Engolvent
- Jocelyne Langer as Teutberge
- Paul Mercey as Le maire de La Rochelle
- Pierre Parel as Geoffroy

== Bibliography ==
- John Haines. Music in Films on the Middle Ages. Routledge, 2013.
