= Porte des Lilas =

Porte des Lilas may refer to:

- Porte des Lilas, a city gate of Paris and the surrounding area
- Porte des Lilas station, a Paris Metro station in the Porte des Lilas area
- Porte des Lilas (film), a 1957 French-Italian dramatic film directed by René Clair
