= The Tricyclist =

1957 film

- Directed by: Jacques Pinoteau
- Written by: Pierre Apestéguy; Jean Devaivre; Gabriel Germain
- Produced by: Adry De Carbuccia; Roland Girard
- Starring: Darry Cowl; Béatrice Altariba; Pierre Mondy
- Cinematography: Pierre Petit
- Edited by: Georges Arnstam
- Music by: Michel Legrand
- Production company: Les Films du Cyclope
- Distributed by: Pathé Consortium Cinéma
- Release date: 4 December 1957
- Running time: 93 minutes
- Country: France
- Language: French

The Tricyclist (French: Le triporteur) is a 1957 French sports comedy film directed by Jacques Pinoteau and starring Darry Cowl, Béatrice Altariba and Pierre Mondy. It was adapted from a novel of the same title by René Fallet. It was shot at the Victorine Studios in Nice and on location around the city including at the Stade du Ray as well as in Burgundy. The film's sets were designed by the art director Jacques Douy. It was followed by a sequel Monsieur Robinson Crusoe in 1960.

== Cast ==
- Darry Cowl as Antoine Peyralout
- Béatrice Altariba as Popeline
- Pierre Mondy as Un gendarme
- Grégoire Aslan as Mouillefarine
- Roger Carel as Un paysan
- Maurice Gardett as Le speaker
- Jacques Thébault as Un copain de Jean-Claude
- Christian Nohel as Un copain de Jean-Claude
- Jean Ozenne as Gérard Ducottait - un voyageur
- Pierre Doris as Le voyageur à la deux-chevaux
- Jacques Hilling as L'entraîneur du club
- Christiane Muller as Une copine de Jean-Claude
- Alain Bouvette as Un soigneur
- Bob Ingarao as Boulet-de-canon
- Mario David as Dabek - le gardien de but
- Robert Arnoux as Le dirigeant
- Jean-Claude Brialy as Jean-Claude
- René Hell as Le vieux paysan

== Bibliography ==
- Goble, Alan. The Complete Index to Literary Sources in Film. Walter de Gruyter, 1999.
- Rège, Philippe. Encyclopedia of French Film Directors, Volume 1. Scarecrow Press, 2009.
