= Raymond Bussières =

French actor (1907–1982)

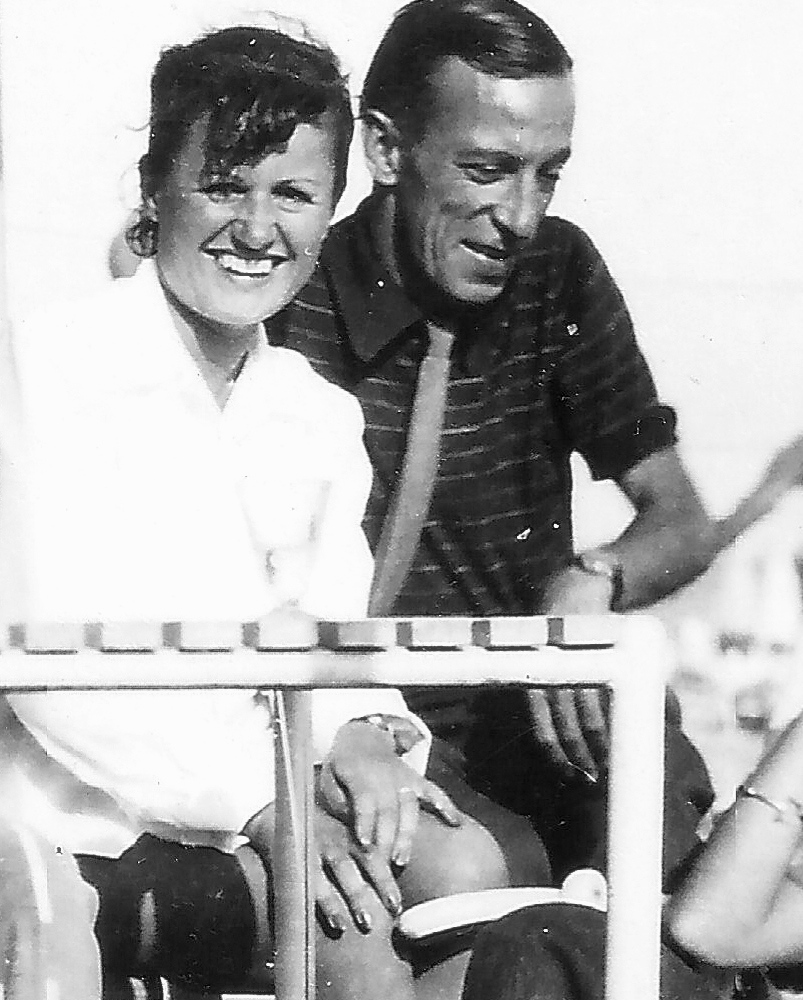
- Annette Poivre and Raymond Buissière in 1948
- Born: 3 November 1907; Ivry-la-Bataille, France
- Died: 29 April 1982 (aged 74); Paris, France
- Occupation: Actor
- Years active: 1933–1982
- Spouse: Annette Poivre (?-1982) (his death)
- Children: Sophie Sel

Raymond Bussières (3 November 1907 – 29 April 1982) was a French actor. He was born in Ivry-la-Bataille. He began his career on the stage as a member of the celebrated Groupe Octobre. He appeared in more than 160 films from 1933 to 1982. In his early career he excelled in portraying the Parisian street urchin persona in many of his films. On television he had success in the 1977 mini-series Le Pain noir. He died in Paris and is buried in Marchenoir. He was married to the actress Annette Poivre.

== Selected filmography ==
- Ciboulette (1933) – Un clochard
- Hotel Free Exchange (1934) – Bob (uncredited)
- Lights of Paris (1938)
- Coral Reefs (1939) – L'infirmier
- Romance of Paris (1941) – Un joueur (uncredited)
- Portrait of Innocence (1941) – Gaston
- The Chain Breaker (1941) – Le camelot
- Opéra-musette (1942) – Le coiffeur
- Chiffon's Wedding (1942) – Marcel Férez
- The Murderer Lives at 21 (1942) – Jean-Baptiste Turlot
- Home Port (1943) – Fernand
- Madame et le mort (1943) – Griset
- The Stairs Without End (1943) – Fred
- Adieu Léonard (1943) – Le peintre (uncredited)
- Ceux du rivage (1943) – Domanger
- Le carrefour des enfants perdus (1944) – Marcel
- Pamela (1945) – Gomin
- The Last Judgment (1945) – Kroum
- Vive la liberté (1946) – Jo
- Gates of the Night (1946) – Raymond Lécuyer
- Le Bataillon du ciel (1947) – Paname
- The Unknown Singer (1947) – Fernand, Juliens Manager
- Quai des Orfèvres (1947) – Albert (uncredited)
- The Crowned Fish Tavern (1947) – Monseigneur
- The Two Orphans (1947) – Signor Deval
- False Identity (1947) – Achille
- Cab Number 13 (1948) – Jean Jeudi (segments "Delitto" & "Castigo")
- Five Red Tulips (1949) – Albert 'La Puce' Jacquin
- Alice in Wonderland (1949) – The Tailor / The Mad Hatter (narrator)
- Marlene (1949) – Harris
- I Like Only You (1949) – Ernest
- Fandango (1948) – François
- The Widow and the Innocent (1949) – Paulo
- Drame au Vel'd'Hiv (1949) – La Frime
- Branquignol (1949) – Le plombier
- The New Masters (1950) – Victor Tricoudard
- Justice Is Done (1950) – Félix Noblet – le 5ème juré
- Just Me (1950) – Fricotard
- Un sourire dans la tempête (1950) – Paname
- Ein Lächeln im Sturm (1950) – Paname, Besitzer der Salon-Bar
- A Tale of Five Cities (1951) – Jeannine's brother
- The Passage of Venus (1951) – Gigout
- Moumou (1951) – Jules Latouche
- Les Nuits de Paris (1951) – Lulu, le fakir
- Les mousquetaires du roi (1951)
- Le costaud des Batignolles (1952) – Jules
- Casque d'or (1952) – Raymond
- Si ça vous chante (1952)
- My Priest Among the Rich (1952) – La Goupille
- Les Belles de nuit (1952) – Roger – le garagiste / le tambour
- The Nude Dancer (1952) – Saulnier
- Soyez les bienvenus (1952) – Monsieur Rossignol
- The Lottery of Happiness (1953) – Le mari
- The Tour of the Grand Dukes (1953) – Louis – le garçon de café
- Une nuit à Megève (1953) – Ferdinand
- The Enchanting Enemy (1953)
- The Porter from Maxim's (1953) – Le garde-chasse Joseph
- My Brother from Senegal (1953) – Jules Pinson / César Pinson
- It's the Paris Life (1954) – Anatole Leduc
- The Pirates of the Bois de Boulogne (1954) – Hector Colomb
- La cage aux souris (1954) – Arthur dit Tutur
- Ah! Les belles bacchantes (1954) – Le plombier Raymond
- Casse-cou, mademoiselle! (1955) – Robert
- Bedevilled (1955) – Concierge (uncredited)
- Chéri-Bibi (1955) – La Ficelle
- Tant qu'il y aura des femmes (1955) – Hervé
- Impasse des vertus (1955) – Gilbert
- Naughty Girl (1956) – Jérôme
- My Priest Among the Poor (1956) – La Goupille
- Meeting in Paris (1956) – Albert
- Paris, Palace Hotel (1956) – Soupape – le garagiste
- Dedecek automobil (1957) – Marcel Frontenac – mechanic
- Une gosse 'sensass (1957) – Raymond
- Delincuentes (1957) – El Caíd
- A Friend of the Family (1957) – Paul Lemonnier
- Explosive Vacation! (1957) – Max le Fortiche
- Gates of Paris (1957) – Alphonse
- Le désir mène les hommes (1957) – Napoléon Lemoine
- Les Copains du dimanche (1958) – Minor Role (uncredited)
- A Certain Monsieur Jo (1958) – Louis
- Les gaités de l'escadrille (1958) – M. Tignasse
- Le Tombeur (1958) – James
- Sans famille (1958) – Barberin
- Taxi, Roulotte et Corrida (1958) – Léon
- Un jour comme les autres (1958)
- Guinguette (1959) – Biscotte
- Quai du Point-du-Jour (1960) – Émile Dupont
- Fanny (1961) – The Admiral
- The Wonders of Aladdin (1961) – Magician
- A cavallo della tigre (1961) – Il Sorcio
- Che femmina!! E... che dollari! (1961) – Fred
- The Girls of La Rochelle (1962) – Pépin
- Copacabana Palace (1962) – Raymond Broussarc
- Musketeers of the Sea (1962) – Colonnello Ortona
- Three Fables of Love (1962) – Le voleur (segment "Les deux pigeons")
- La Bonne Soupe (1964) – Le chasseur de chez 'Loulou'
- Paris - When It Sizzles (1964) – François
- The Counterfeit Constable (1964) – Un français dans le bus
- Up from the Beach (1965) – Dupre
- The Curse of Belphegor (1967) – Plumme
- Your Turn to Die (1967) – Train conductor
- Ho! (1968) – Robert
- Macédoine (1971) – Le vendeur de journaux
- Stanza 17-17 palazzo delle tasse, ufficio imposte (1971) – Leonardo Rossi
- Four Gunmen of the Holy Trinity (1971) – Dr. Gordon
- Boccaccio (1972) – Cagastraccio
- Return of Halleluja (1972) – Sam – Pawnbroker
- The Man Who Quit Smoking (1972) – French Agent
- The Funny Face of the Godfather (1973) – Don Gennaro Magliulo
- Run, Run, Joe! (1974) – Don Sulpicone
- Gross Paris (1974) – Le père de Jules
- Nuits Rouges (1974) – L'acheteur
- Serious as Pleasure (1975) – Le pêcheur
- La soupe froide (1975) – Antoine
- Trop c'est trop (1975) – Le chauffeur de taxi
- Jonah Who Will Be 25 in the Year 2000 (1976) – Old Charles
- Dracula and Son (1976) – L'homme âgé à l'ANPE
- The Wing or the Thigh (1976) – Henri – le chauffeur de Duchemin
- Le Gang (1977) – Cornélius
- Golden Night (1977) – Charron, un joueur
- Drôles de zèbres (1977) – Le vieux client de l'hôtel
- The Adventures of Picasso (1978) – Mistinguette / Narrator (uncredited)
- Autopsie d'un complot (1978)
- L'Argent des Autres (1978) – Chevalier d'Aven père
- The Escape (1978) – Marcel Duroc
- Le paradis des riches (1978) – René
- La barricade du Point du Jour (1978) – Jean-Baptiste, le maître charpentier
- En l'autre bord (1978) – M. Blain, le voisin
- Le mouton noir (1979) – Le vieux conducteur de la 2 CV
- Subversion (1979) – Emile
- The King and the Mockingbird (1980) – Le chef de la police (Narrator)
- Le Roi et l'oiseau (1980) – Gaston
- Neige (1981) – Menendez
- Invitation au voyage (1982) – Le vieil homme
- Porca vacca (1982) – Zio Nicola
