= Women's Prison (1938 film) =

1938 film

- Directed by: Roger Richebé
- Written by: Francis Carco; René Jolivet; Roger Richebé
- Based on: Women's Prison by Francis Carco
- Produced by: Roger Richebé
- Starring: Viviane Romance; Renée Saint-Cyr; Marguerite Deval
- Cinematography: Jean Isnard
- Edited by: Léonide Azar
- Music by: Jean Lenoir
- Production company: Société des Films Roger Richebé
- Distributed by: Paris Cinéma Location
- Release date: 13 October 1938
- Running time: 102 minutes
- Country: France
- Language: French

Women's Prison or Women's Prisons (French: Prisons de femmes) is a 1938 French drama film directed by Roger Richebé and starring Viviane Romance, Renée Saint-Cyr and Marguerite Deval. Based on the 1930 novel of the same title by Francis Carco, it was remade twice as the 1947 Swedish film Two Women and the 1958 French film Women's Prison.

It was made at the Neuilly Studios in Paris with scenes also shot at the Convent of the Ursulines in Montpellier. The film's sets were designed by the art director Roland Quignon. Along with another contemporary film Prison Without Bars it portrayed the female inhabitants with sympathy. Both films were successful at the box office. Despite its title, only a few scenes take place in prison and it mostly follows a character after she has been released from jail marries an industrialist and attempts to start a new life.

== Cast ==
- Viviane Romance as Régine
- Renée Saint-Cyr as Juliette Régent
- Marguerite Deval as Madame Gaby
- Jean Worms as Max Régent
- Georges Flamant as Dédé
- Lucy Léger as Alice
- Léonce Corne as Le directeur de la prison
- Marcel Delaître as Le commissaire de police
- André Carnège as Le chirurgien
- Henri Pons as L'employé de l'hôpital
- Roland Armontel as Un domestique
- René Bergeron as Monsieur Chevrier
- Renée Ludger as Madame Chevrier
- Marcel Pérès as Le marinier
- Paul Amiot as Le procureur
- Jacques Dumesnil as L'avocat
- Paul Escoffier as Le président des Assises
- Liliane Lesaffre as La surveillante-chef
- Yves Deniaud as Victor
- René Alié as Poloche
- Eddy Debray as L'aumônier de la prison
- Colette Proust as L'infirmière
- Francis Carco as Self

== Bibliography ==
- Crisp, Colin. French Cinema—A Critical Filmography: Volume 1, 1929–1939. Indiana University Press, 2015.
- Goble, Alan. The Complete Index to Literary Sources in Film. Walter de Gruyter, 1999.
- Larsson, Mariah & Marklund, Anders. Swedish Film: An Introduction and Reader. Nordic Academic Press, 2010.
