= Le Bataillon du ciel =

1947 film by Alexander Esway

Sky Battalion
- Directed by: Alexander Esway
- Written by: Joseph Kessel
- Produced by: Wilfrid Baumgartner; Raymond Borderie; Adrien Remaugé
- Starring: Raymond Bussières; Howard Vernon; Pierre Blanchar
- Cinematography: Nicolas Hayer
- Edited by: Léonide Azar
- Music by: Manuel Rosenthal; Maurice Thiriet
- Distributed by: Pathé
- Release dates: 8 March 1947 (I, They are no Angels); April 1947 (II, The land of France)
- Running time: 130 minutes
- Country: France
- Language: French

Le Bataillon du ciel (Sky Battalion) is a 1947 French film in two parts by Alexander Esway about the Second World War. The film, written by Joseph Kessel, became the biggest box office success in France that year with more than 8 million tickets sold.

The first part, Ce ne sont pas des anges (They are no Angels) was released on 8 March 1947, the second part Terre de France (The land of France) one month later. The total length is 3 hours and 20 minutes. It tells the story of French parachute troops who train in Free France and then land in Brittany the day before the Normandy landings to fight against the Germans.

Despite being one of the few films to deal with the resistance against the German occupation from within Free France (the most important other one being Taxi for Tobruk), it was cited a lot less in studies of French films dealing with the Second World War than films about either the resistance within occupied France, or the efforts by the Allies.

== Cast ==
- Raymond Bussières
- Howard Vernon
- Pierre Blanchar
- René Lefèvre
- Janine Crispin
- Marcel Mouloudji
