= My Priest Among the Rich (1938 film) =

1938 film

- Directed by: Jean Boyer
- Written by: Jean-Pierre Feydeau; André Hornez
- Based on: My Priest Among the Rich by Clément Vautel
- Produced by: Joseph Bercholz; Albert Dodrumez
- Starring: Bach; Elvire Popesco; André Alerme
- Cinematography: Victor Arménise
- Edited by: Marguerite Beaugé
- Music by: Georges Van Parys
- Production company: Union des Distributeurs Indépendants
- Distributed by: Compagnie Commerciale Française Cinématographique
- Release date: 22 December 1938
- Running time: 100 minutes
- Country: France
- Language: French

My Priest Among the Rich (French: Mon curé chez les riches) is a 1938 French comedy film directed by Jean Boyer and starring Bach, Elvire Popesco and André Alerme. The film's sets were designed by the art director Jacques Colombier. It was based on the 1923 novel of the same title by Clément Vautel, the third film adaptation to be made.

== Cast ==
- Bach as L'abbé Pellegrin
- Elvire Popesco as Lisette Cousinet
- André Alerme as Émile Cousinet
- Alice Tissot as Une dame patronesse
- Jeanne Fusier-Gir as Une dame patronesse
- Jane Sourza as Une dame patronesse
- Maximilienne as Une dame patronesse
- Jacqueline Marsan as Sylvette
- Line Dariel as Valérie
- Monique Bert as La femme de chambre
- Jean Dax as Monsieur de Sableuse
- Henri Monteux as Monseigneur
- Marcel Vallée as Profilex - le maire-docteur
- Raymond Cordy as Plumoiseau
- Raymond Aimos as Triboulet
- Paul Cambo as Pierre de Sableuse

== Bibliography ==
- Bessy, Maurice & Chirat, Raymond. Histoire du cinéma français: encyclopédie des films, Volume 2. Pygmalion, 1986.
- Crisp, Colin. Genre, Myth and Convention in the French Cinema, 1929-1939. Indiana University Press, 2002.
- Rège, Philippe. Encyclopedia of French Film Directors, Volume 1. Scarecrow Press, 2009.
