= La Chienne =

1931 film directed by Jean Renoir

- Film poster
- Directed by: Jean Renoir
- Written by: Jean Renoir
- Based on: La Chienne by: Georges de La Fouchardière (novel) and André Mouëzy-Éon; (play)
- Produced by: Pierre Braunberger; Roger Richebé; Charles David (production manager)
- Starring: Michel Simon; Janie Marèse; Georges Flamant; Magdeleine Bérubet
- Cinematography: Theodor Sparkuhl
- Edited by: Marguerite Renoir
- Production company: Les Etablissement Braunberger-Richebé
- Distributed by: Gaumont
- Release date: 19 November 1931
- Running time: 96 minutes
- Country: France
- Language: French

La Chienne (English: The Bitch) is a 1931 French film by director Jean Renoir. It is the second sound film by the director and the twelfth film of his career. The film is based on the eponymous story "La Chienne" by Georges de La Fouchardière. The literal English translation of the film's title is "The Bitch", although the film was never released under this title. The film was remade by Fritz Lang in the United States as Scarlet Street (1945).

La Chienne was released by The Criterion Collection on both Blu-ray and DVD, newly restored in 4K, on 14 June 2016.

== Plot ==
Maurice Legrand, a meek cashier and aspirant painter, is married to Adèle, an abusive woman whose former husband Alexis Godard had died during World War I. Maurice attends a company celebration, and as he leaves, he sees a man named André "Dédé" Jauguin hitting Lucienne "Lulu" Pelletier, a prostitute, on the street. Lulu hits him back in defense as Maurice approaches them. He learns they are waiting a taxi ride, and accompanies them. After Dédé is dropped at his residence, Maurice walks Lulu home. Along the way, she reveals that Dédé is actually her pimp, having known him for three years.

Maurice returns home and is questioned by Adèle why he has arrived late; she also degrades his paintings, as she complains they are cluttering their apartment. One month later, Maurice has rented an apartment for Lulu, whom he takes as his mistress, and decorates the apartment with his paintings since Adèle intends to throw them away. One night, Maurice and Lulu are alone together until he sees her apartment lights are on. Lulu returns to her apartment, where Dédé has arrived. He takes the paintings and schemes to sell them claiming they were painted by Lulu using an American alias "Clara Wood".

Several weeks pass, and Maurice is directed by his employer to an art store where he sees his paintings on display. At her apartment, Lulu deceives Maurice into claiming that she and her fictitious brother had sold the paintings to Wallstein. The paintings become a success with the art critics, and Dédé and Lulu become affluent. Sometime later, Maurice stumbles upon Adèle's former husband Alexis, who had supposedly died. Alexis explains at a café that during the war, he was falsely reported as dead after he had switched identification cards with another soldier to escape his marriage to Adèle. He was then captured by the Germans as a prisoner of war and served time in prison before he was released. Now penniless, Alexis asks Maurice for one thousand francs, which Maurice knows Adèle has hidden in her wardrobe.

Maurice arranges to have Alexis steal the money as he falsely claims he and Adèle will attend a theatre tomorrow night. The scheme succeeds in Maurice's favor as Adèle calls the police, whom Maurice informs that Alexis is indeed alive. As a free man, Maurice goes to Lulu's apartment, but discovers she and Dédé are in bed together. He leaves in shock, but returns in the morning to talk to Lulu. She confesses that she loves Dédé and humiliates Maurice, saying that the only reason she stayed with him was his money. Maurice stabs her with a knife and leaves the apartment with no witnesses.

Lulu is later found dead, and Maurice and Dédé are questioned. The interrogator releases Maurice due to his lack of a criminal history. Dédé is charged with Lulu's murder owing to his reputation, and is found guilty and executed. Maurice is accused of mishandling 2500 francs by his employer, and is fired under the guise for having health problems. Maurice roams the street as a vagrant, and reencounters Alexis who informs him that Adèle had died. As a car transports Maurice's self portrait, Maurice and Alexis obtain 20 francs off the street and walk off.

== Cast ==
- Michel Simon as Maurice Legrand
- Janie Marèse as Lucienne 'Lulu' Pelletier
- Georges Flamant as André 'Dédé' Jauguin
- Magdeleine Bérubet as Adèle Legrand
- Roger Gaillard as Sergeant Alexis Godard
- Jean Gehret as Dugodet
- Alexandre Rignault as Langelarde
- Lucien Mancini as Wallstein
- Marcel Courmes as Colonel
- Max Dalban as Bernard
- Henri Guisol as Amédée
- Romain Bouquet as Henriot
- Pierre Desty as Gustave
- Jane Pierson as the Concierge
- Christian Argentin as Examining judge
- Sylvain Itkine as Dédé's lawyer
- Colette Borelli as Lily
- Marthe Doryans as Yvonne

== Production and aftermath ==
In the film Michel Simon falls in love with Janie Marèse, and he did off-screen as well, while Marèse fell for Georges Flamant, who plays the pimp. Renoir and producer Pierre Braunberger had encouraged the relationship between Flamant and Marèse in order to get the fullest conviction into their performances (La Chienne was Flamant's first acting experience). After the film had been completed Flamant, who could barely drive, took Marèse for a drive, crashed the car and she was killed. At the funeral Michel Simon fainted and had to be supported as he walked past the grave. He threatened Renoir with a gun, saying that the death of Marèse was all his fault. "Kill me if you like", responded Renoir, "but I have made the film".

== Home media ==
On 23 October 2003 La Chienne was released on DVD in France by Opening Distribution, along with Renoir's On purge bébé (1931), Tire-au-flanc (1928), and Catherine (1924), as part of a box set. The film was later released together with Renoir's Partie de campagne (A Day in the Country) by M6 Vidéo on both Blu-ray and DVD in France on 10 November 2015.

La Chienne was released in North America on LaserDisc in 1989 by Image Entertainment as part of the "CinemaDisc Collection". The film was also released on VHS by Kino International on 5 February 2002, which includes Partie de campagne as an extra. On 14 June 2016 American video-distribution company The Criterion Collection released La Chienne, newly restored through a 4K digital transfer, on Blu-ray and DVD. Both editions include a 1961 introduction to the film by director Jean Renoir, a new interview with a Renoir scholar, a new restoration of Renoir's On purge bébé, a 95-minute conversation between Renoir and actor Michel Simon directed by Jacques Rivette, new English subtitles for the film, and an essay by film scholar Ginette Vincendeau. The new Blu-ray and DVD cover as well as interior poster was illustrated by Blutch.
