= Domino (1943 film) =

1943 film

- Directed by: Roger Richebé
- Written by: Jean Aurenche
- Based on: Domino by Marcel Achard
- Produced by: Roger Richebé
- Starring: Fernand Gravey; Simone Renant; Aimé Clariond
- Cinematography: Jean Isnard
- Edited by: Raymond Leboursier
- Music by: Vincent Scotto
- Production company: Films Roger Richebé
- Distributed by: Films Roger Richebé
- Release date: 28 July 1943
- Running time: 100 minutes
- Country: France
- Language: French

Domino is a 1943 French drama film directed by Roger Richebé and starring Fernand Gravey, Simone Renant and Aimé Clariond. It is based on the 1932 play of the same title by Marcel Achard. It was shot at the Saint-Maurice Studios in Paris. The film's sets were designed by the art director Lucien Carré.

== Synopsis ==
A young man known as Domino arrives back in Paris virtually penniless. To try and raise money he tries to sell a statuette to an art dealer, but is soon drawn into a deception by the gallery owner's wife who is trying to convince her jealous husband that love letters he has discovered from her ongoing affair are really relics of her long ago romance with Domino.

== Cast ==
- Fernand Gravey as Dominique
- Simone Renant as Laurette
- Aimé Clariond as Heller
- Yves Deniaud as Mirandole
- Suzet Maïs as Jane
- Bernard Blier as Crémone
- Léonce Corne as L'hôtelier
- Paul Faivre as Le voyageur
- Jean Marconi as Le passant

== Bibliography ==
- Goble, Alan. The Complete Index to Literary Sources in Film. Walter de Gruyter, 1999.
