= Léonce Corne =

French actor

- Born: 18 March 1894; Beauvais, France
- Died: 31 December 1977 (aged 83); Chartres, France
- Resting place: Bretoncelles
- Occupation: Actor
- Years active: 1931-1974

Léonce Charles Corne (18 March 1894 – 31 December 1977) was a French film actor. He appeared in 120 films between 1931 and 1974.

== Selected filmography ==
- The Girl and the Boy (1931)
- Luck (1931)
- Rouletabille the Aviator (1932)
- The Premature Father (1933)
- Dédé (1935)
- Forty Little Mothers (1936)
- The Green Jacket (1937)
- The Man from Nowhere (1937)
- Wells in Flames (1937)
- A Picnic on the Grass (1937)
- Ignace (1937)
- Alexis, Gentleman Chauffeur (1938)
- Return at Dawn (1938)
- The Novel of Werther (1938)
- Women's Prison (1938)
- Coral Reefs (1939)
- Midnight Tradition (1939)
- Happy Days (1941)
- Romance of Paris (1941)
- Portrait of Innocence (1941)
- The Master Valet (1941)
- Fever (1942)
- At Your Command, Madame (1942)
- Colonel Pontcarral (1942)
- Forces occultes (1943)
- The Midnight Sun (1943)
- Summer Light (1943)
- Domino (1943)
- The Woman Who Dared (1944)
- Box of Dreams (1945)
- The Bellman (1945)
- Father Goriot (1945)
- Roger la Honte (1946)
- The Lost Village (1947)
- False Identity (1947)
- Under the Cards (1948)
- Return to Life (1949)
- Monsieur Octave (1951)
- Alone in Paris (1951)
- Two Pennies Worth of Violets (1951)
- We Are All Murderers (1952)
- My Priest Among the Rich (1952)
- The Agony of the Eagles (1952)
- The Beauty of Cadiz (1953)
- The Sparrows of Paris (1953)
- When Do You Commit Suicide? (1953)
- Capitaine Pantoufle (1953)
- Before the Deluge (1954)
- Blood to the Head (1956)
- Thérèse Étienne (1958)
- Certains l'aiment froide (1960)
- Lovers on a Tightrope (1960)
- Le Gentleman d'Epsom (1962)
- On Murder Considered as One of the Fine Arts (1964)
- Your Money or Your Life (1966)
- Paris in August (1966)
- The Second Twin (1966)
- Alexandre le bienheureux (1968)
- Rendezvous at Bray (1971)
