= Thérèse Martin (film) =

1939 film

- Directed by: Maurice de Canonge
- Written by: Henry Dupuis-Mazuel; Maurice Gleize; Robert Hennion
- Produced by: Marcel de Hubsch
- Starring: Irène Corday; Madeleine Soria; Marthe Mellot
- Cinematography: Joseph-Louis Mundwiller
- Edited by: Mireille Bessette; Robert Hennion
- Music by: Jacques Ibert
- Production companies: Atlantic Film; Les Productions Françaises Cinématographiques
- Distributed by: Filmsonor
- Release date: 7 June 1939
- Running time: 90 minutes
- Country: France
- Language: French

Thérèse Martin is a 1939 French biographical drama film directed by Maurice de Canonge and starring Irène Corday, Madeleine Soria and Marthe Mellot. It portrays the life of the Roman Catholic saint Thérèse of Lisieux. The film's sets were designed by the art director Claude Bouxin.

== Cast ==
- Irène Corday as Thérèse Martin
- Geneviève Callix as Elisabeth d'Estranges
- Madeleine Soria as Mme. d'Estranges
- Marthe Mellot as La supérieure
- André Marnay as M. André Martin
- Marthe Mancelle as Mme. Martin
- Lucien Gallas as Le docteur Dartès
- Camille Bert as Le docteur Carnière
- Noël Roquevert as Le colonel d'Estranges
- Raymond Aimos as Joseph
- Georges Saillard as L'abbé
- Colette Borelli as Thérèse enfant
- Pierre Feuillère as Maître Moumelon
- Yvonne Broussard as Céline Martin
- Janine Borelli as Pauline
- Solange Turenne as Pauline enfant
- Robert Moor as M. Guérin
- Geno Ferny as Firmin
- Nicholas Malikov as Pope Leo XIII

== Bibliography ==
- Rège, Philippe . Encyclopedia of French Film Directors, Volume 1. Scarecrow Press, 2009.
