= Béatrice Altariba =

French actress (1939–2026)

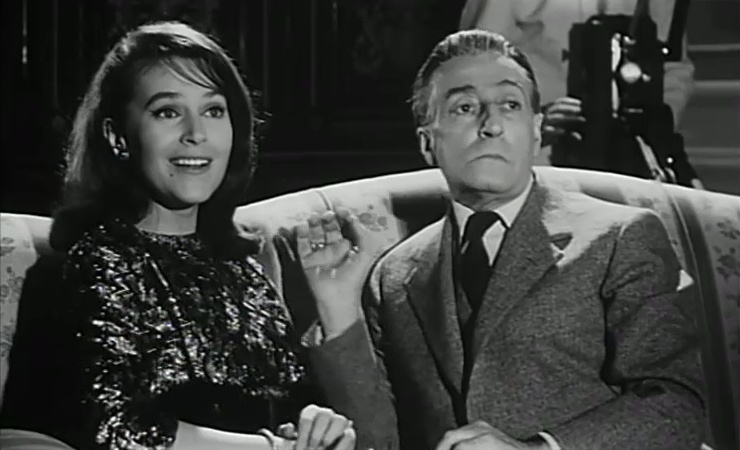
Altariba and Totò in Totò Diabolicus (1962)

Béatrice Florence Andree Altariba-Homs (18 June 1939 – 14 July 2026) was a French actress who was active between 1956 and 1969, especially in French and Italian Golden Age Cinema for playing Cosette in Les Misérables and Diana in Totò Diabolicus.

== Life and career ==
Born in Marseille on 18 June 1939, she was the niece of symbolist poet Paul Fort. She started her career in revues and musical theatre, then she made her film debut at 17. Altariba was also active in Italian cinema. Her last French television appearance was in the first episode of the television series The Aeronauts in 1967.

Altariba died in Paris on 14 July 2026, at the age of 87.

== Partial filmography ==
- Forgive Us Our Trespasses (1956) - Sassia
- Lorsque l'enfant paraît (1956) - Natacha
- L'Homme et l'Enfant (1956) - Hélène Mercier
- Women's Club (1956) - Dominique
- Les violents (1957) - Lisiane Chartrain
- A Friend of the Family (1957) - Sophie
- The Tricyclist (1957) - Popeline
- Les Misérables (1958) - Cosette
- Le temps des oeufs durs (1958) - Lucie Grandvivier
- Be Beautiful But Shut Up (1958) - Olga Babitcheff
- Le petit prof (1959) - Françoise
- Eyes Without a Face (1960) - Paulette
- Monsieur Robinson Crusoe (1960) - Popeline
- Les pique-assiette (1960) - Laurence
- Behind Closed Doors (1961) - La sposina
- Three Faces of Sin (1961) - Une invitée au vernissage
- A Man Named Rocca (1961) - Maud
- Crazy Desire (1962) - Silvana
- Totò Diabolicus (1962) - Diana
- The Seventh Sword (1962) - Isabella
- The Young Racers (1963) - Monique
- Hold-up à Saint-Trop (1963)
- La banda Casaroli (1963) - Ragazza Al Bar
- The Four Musketeers (1963) - Anne d'Autriche
- The Gorillas (1964) - Sylvie Danlevent
- On Murder Considered as One of the Fine Arts (1964)
- Su e giù (1965) - (segment "Questione di principio")
- Agent 3S3: Passport to Hell (1965) - Elisa von Sloot
- Le caïd de Champignol (1966) - Evelyne
- Et la femme créa l'amour (1966) - Anouchka
- Darling Caroline (1968) - Une aristocrate chez Belhomme
- La Prisonnière (1968) - Une invitée au vernissage (uncredited)
- Cemetery Without Crosses (1969) - Saloon Woman (final film role)
