= My Wife, My Cow and Me =

1952 film

- Italian poster
- Directed by: Jean Devaivre
- Written by: Gérard Carlier; André Tabet
- Produced by: Paul de Saint-André
- Starring: Erminio Macario; Irène Corday; Annette Poivre
- Cinematography: Lucien Joulin
- Edited by: Louis Devaivre
- Music by: Louiguy
- Production company: Les Films Artistiques
- Distributed by: Lux Compagnie Cinématographique de France; Lux Film (Italy)
- Release date: 8 May 1952
- Running time: 93 minutes
- Country: France
- Language: French

My Wife, My Cow and Me (French: Ma femme, ma vache et moi) is a 1952 French comedy film directed by Jean Devaivre, starring Erminio Macario, Irène Corday and Annette Poivre.

The film's sets were designed by the art director Claude Bouxin.

== Synopsis ==
Bored of the country life, Marinette returns to Paris, where she had been a dancer before her marriage. Her husband follows, bringing along their cow and young daughter.

== Cast ==
- Erminio Macario as Mario
- Irène Corday as Marinette
- Annette Poivre
- Robert Balpo
- Jean Daurand
- Arthur Devère
- Albert Dinan
- Jacques Dufilho
- Geno Ferny
- Michel Galabru
- Françoise Lauby
- Charles Lemontier
- Marguerite Letombe
- Maurice Marceau
- Raoul Marco
- Marcel Meral
- Albert Michel
- Arlette Poirier
- Émile Riandreys
- Carlo Rizzo
- Marcel Rouzé
- Fernand Sardou

== Bibliography ==
- Rège, Philippe. Encyclopedia of French Film Directors, Volume 1. Scarecrow Press, 2009.
