= My Priest Among the Rich (1932 film) =

1932 film

- Directed by: Émile-Bernard Donatien
- Written by: Pierre Chaine; André de Lorde
- Based on: My Priest Among the Rich by Clément Vautel
- Starring: Jim Gérald; Alice Roberts; André Roanne
- Cinematography: Georges Lucas
- Music by: Georges Van Parys
- Production company: Isis-Film
- Release date: 29 April 1932
- Running time: 98 minutes
- Country: France
- Language: French

My Priest Among the Rich (French: Mon curé chez les riches) is a 1932 French comedy film directed by Émile-Bernard Donatien and starring Jim Gérald, Alice Roberts and André Roanne. It is a remake of the 1925 silent film of the same title, itself based on the 1923 novel My Priest Among the Rich by Clément Vautel.

== Cast ==
- Jim Gérald as L'abbé Pellegrin
- Alice Roberts as Mme Cousinet
- André Roanne as Pierre de Sableuse
- Pierre Juvenet as M. Cousinet
- Camille Bert as Monseigneur Sibué
- Pauline Carton as La bonne
- Carlos Avril
- Lisette Lanvin

== Bibliography ==
- Bessy, Maurice & Chirat, Raymond. Histoire du cinéma français: 1929-1934. Pygmalion, 1988.
- Crisp, Colin. Genre, Myth and Convention in the French Cinema, 1929-1939. Indiana University Press, 2002.
- Goble, Alan. The Complete Index to Literary Sources in Film. Walter de Gruyter, 1999.
- Rège, Philippe. Encyclopedia of French Film Directors, Volume 1. Scarecrow Press, 2009.
