= Janie Marèse =

French actress (1908–1931)

- Born: Jeanne Marie Thérèse Bugnot; 23 May 1908; Chartres
- Died: 14 August 1931 (aged 23); Saint-Tropez
- Occupation: Actor

Janie Marèse (born Jeanne Marie Thérèse Bugnot, 23 May 1908 in Chartres, Eure-et-Loir - 14 August 1931 in Sainte-Maxime, Var) was a French actress who appeared in four shorts and three feature-length films, most notably Jean Renoir's second sound film La Chienne, before her death at age 23, in a road accident.

== Career ==
Marèse made her first screen appearance in a 1929 short, C'est par amour pour vous Madame. Her first full-length feature was Amours viennoises in 1930, followed by the Marc Allégret-directed adaptation of Mam'zelle Nitouche.

Marèse's break came when she was offered the leading role (originally intended for Catherine Hessling) in Renoir's La Chienne (The Bitch), in which she played Lulu, a prostitute who connives with her pimp and lover (Georges Flamant) to financially exploit an unhappily married man (Michel Simon) who has fallen in love with her. Marèse's performance was well received and seemed to mark the start of a potentially successful career.

== Death ==
Shortly after the completion of La Chienne, Marèse was travelling on the French Riviera in a car driven by her co-star Georges Flamant when Flamant lost control of the vehicle, which overturned, killing Marèse instantly. Flamant survived the accident. The French media, shocked by the untimely death of a promising young talent, subsequently vilified Flamant (he was labelled "un assassin" by some newspapers) to the extent that his career was seriously damaged by negative public perception.

== Filmography ==
Feature films

- 1930: Amours viennoises - dir. Jean Choux and Robert Land
- 1931: Mam'zelle Nitouche - dir. Marc Allégret
- 1931: La Chienne - dir. Jean Renoir

Short films

- 1929: C'est par amour pour vous Madame - dir. Henri Lepage
- 1931: Les Quatre Jambes - dir. Marc Allégret
- 1931: Isolons-nous Gustave - dir. Marc Allégret
- 1931: Le Collier - dir. Marc Allégret
