= Taxi, Roulotte et Corrida =

- Directed by: André Hunebelle
- Written by: Jean Halain; Jean Redon
- Produced by: André Hunebelle; Jules Borkon
- Starring: Louis de Funès
- Cinematography: Paul Cotteret
- Edited by: Françoise Javet
- Music by: Jean Marion
- Distributed by: Pathé Consortium Cinéma
- Release date: 22 November 1958 (France)
- Running time: 86 minutes
- Country: France
- Language: French

Taxi, Roulotte et Corrida French: Taxi, Trailer and Bullfight, is a French comedy film from 1958, directed by André Hunebelle, written by Jean Halain, starring Louis de Funès.

== Cast ==
- Louis de Funès : Maurice Berger, taxi driver
- Raymond Bussières : Léon, Maurice's brother-in-law
- Annette Poivre : Mathilde, wife of Léon
- Jacques Dufilho : the client of taxi
- Paulette Dubost : Germaine, the wife of Maurice
- Guy Bertil : Jacques Berger, the son of Maurice and Germaine
- Véra Valmont : Myriam, the flirt
- Jacques Dynam : Pedro, one of the bandits
- Albert Pilette : Gonzalès, one of the bandits
- Sophie Sel : Nicole, the daughter of Léon and Mathilde
- Max Révol : Mr Fred, the leader of the band
- Jacques Bertrand : Carlos, henchman of Fred
- Louis Bugette : Casimir, a neighbour of Maurice
- Roger Demart : the barman
