= The Porter from Maxim's (1953 film) =

1953 film by Henri Diamant-Berger

- Directed by: Henri Diamant-Berger
- Written by: Henri Diamant-Berger; François Jérôme; Yves Mirande (play)
- Produced by: Henri Diamant-Berger; Charles Smadja
- Starring: Yves Deniaud; Pierre Larquey; Raymond Bussières
- Cinematography: Victor Arménise
- Edited by: Hélène Basté
- Music by: Louis Gasté
- Production companies: Actor-Films; Le Film d'Art
- Release date: 14 August 1953
- Running time: 96 minutes
- Country: France
- Language: French

The Porter from Maxim's (French: Le Chasseur de chez Maxim's) is a 1953 French comedy film directed by Henri Diamant-Berger and starring Yves Deniaud, Pierre Larquey and Raymond Bussières. It is based on the 1923 play of the same name which has been made into several film adaptations. It was shot at the Neuilly Studios and on location in Paris. The film's sets were designed by the art director Roger Briaucourt.

== Synopsis ==
Julien Pauphilat spent many years working as a porter at the famous Maxim's restaurant in Paris. It proved a very lucrative job and he has now retired and bought a chateau in the countryside. He has always told his daughter he is an industrialist and he has acquired a reputation amongst his new neighbours. However, one of his former regulars at Maxim's now moves to the area and begins courting Julien's daughter, to his discomfort.

== Cast ==
- Yves Deniaud as Julien Pauphilat
- Pierre Larquey as Le chanoine Mercey
- Raymond Bussières as Le garde-chasse Joseph
- Jean Debucourt as Le baron
- Jacqueline Pierreux as Cri-Cri
- Sylvie Pelayo as Geneviève Pauphilat
- Pauline Carton as Sophie
- Gérard Séty as Le chambellan
- Madeleine Suffel as Emma
- Davia as Madame de Méry
- Denise Kerny
- Andrée Servilanges as Mme Gunelet
- Andrée Lafayette as Madame de Beaubourg
- Nicole Riche as Catherine
- Paul Villé as Ernest
- Clément Thierry as Octave
- Pierre Magnier as Honoré
- Henri Debain as M. de Méry
- André Numès Fils as M. Amédée
- Charles Lemontier as Gunelet
- Serge Lecointe as Le petit chasseur
- Roger Saget as Le roi Babouch IV
- Denise Provence as Lise
- Jean Piat as André de Velin

== Bibliography ==
- Rearick, Charles. Paris Dreams, Paris Memories: The City and Its Mystique. Stanford University Press, 2011.
