= The Passage of Venus =

1951 film

- Directed by: Maurice Gleize
- Written by: Maurice Gleize
- Based on: The Passage of Venus by Georges Berr and Louis Verneuil
- Produced by: Albert-Pierre Barrière
- Starring: Pierre Larquey; Blanchette Brunoy; Annette Poivre
- Cinematography: Paul Cotteret
- Edited by: Renée Guérin
- Music by: Georges Derveaux
- Production company: Arca Films
- Distributed by: Les Films Marceau
- Release date: 30 August 1951
- Running time: 93 minutes
- Country: France
- Language: French

The Passage of Venus (French: Le passage de Vénus) is a 1951 French comedy film directed by Maurice Gleize and starring Pierre Larquey, Blanchette Brunoy and Annette Poivre. The film's sets were designed by the art director Lucien Carré. It is based on the 1928 play of the same title by Georges Berr and Louis Verneuil.

== Cast ==
- Pierre Larquey as Virgile Seguin
- Blanchette Brunoy as Hortense Bicquois
- Annette Poivre as Gudule
- Frédéric Duvallès as Lazare Chantoiseau - un astronome
- Raymond Bussières as Gigout
- Félix Oudart as Le juge Bulle
- Roland Armontel as Gustave Bicquois
- Al Cabrol as Bibi la Barbouse
- Rivers Cadet as M. Rabusset
- Bernard Charlan as Rémi
- Paul Demange as Trapu
- Maurice Dorléac as Le commissaire de police
- Thérèse Dorny as Zoé Chantoiseau
- Milly Mathis as Mme Rabusset
- Jacques Meyran as Maître Mouche
- Claude Nicot as Pascal Pommier
- Nadine Tallier as Gisèle

== Bibliography ==
- Bessy, Maurice & Chirat, Raymond. Histoire du cinéma français: encyclopédie des films, 1940–1950. Pygmalion, 1986
- Rège, Philippe. Encyclopedia of French Film Directors, Volume 1. Scarecrow Press, 2009.
