= Suzanne Dehelly =

French actress (1896–1968)

- Born: 1 October 1896; Paris, France
- Died: 12 October 1968 (aged 72); Paris, France
- Occupation: Actress
- Years active: 1913 - 1963 (film)

Suzanne Dehelly (1896–1968) was a French film actress.

== Selected filmography ==
- Graziella (1926) - Graziella
- A Hole in the Wall (1930) - La couturière
- La prison en folie (1931) - Cléo d'Argyl
- Tout s'arrange (1931) - Micheline
- Mon amant l'assassin (1932) - Simone Bondizi
- Une nuit de folies (1934) - Suzanne
- Les bleus de la marine (1934) - Elyane
- The Crisis is Over (1934) - Olga
- Un soir de bombe (1935) - Emma
- La mariée du régiment (1936)
- La petite dame du wagon-lit (1936) - Eudoxie
- La brigade en jupons (1936) - Frédérique
- Prête-moi ta femme (1936) - Angèle
- La reine des resquilleuses (1937) - Victorine
- Arsene Lupin, Detective (1937) - L'amie d'Olga (uncredited)
- Cinderella (1937) - Virginie
- Mon deputé et sa femme (1937) - La princesse
- Monsieur Bégonia (1937) - Aurélie Merchant
- Chipée (1938) - Mme Point
- Titin des Martigues (1938) - Totoche
- That's Sport (1938) - Ernestine
- Une de la cavalerie (1938) - Léonie Vigoulette
- The President (1938) - Madame Tricointe
- Gargousse (1938) - Zozo
- Paid Holidays (1938) - Sabine
- Mon oncle et mon curé (1939) - Suzon
- The Man Who Seeks the Truth (1940) - Madame Lamblin
- Marseille mes amours (1940) - Tante Zoé
- Premier rendez-vous (1941) - Mademoiselle Christophine
- Pension Jonas (1942) - Le baronne de Crochezoet
- Sideral Cruises (1942) - Georgette Marchand
- At Your Command, Madame (1942) - Odette Dupuis
- The Beautiful Adventure (1942) - Madame d'Éguzon
- Le grand combat (1942) - Antoinette
- Feu Nicolas (1943) - Madame Ballard
- The Ménard Collection (1944) - Dora
- Le roi des resquilleurs (1945) - Arlette Sycleton / Carla
- Pas un mot à la reine mère (1946) - La reine Catherine de Neustrie
- Rouletabille joue et gagne (1947) - Florine
- The Idol (1948) - Valérie Jourdan
- Rouletabille contre la dame de pique (1948) - Florine
- Five Red Tulips (1949) - Colonelle
- My Aunt from Honfleur (1949) - Mme Raymond, la tante d'Honfleur
- At the Grand Balcony (1949) - Mlle Françoise
- The Prize (1950) - Mlle Cadenat
- Olivia (1951) - Mademoiselle (Hortense) Dubois
- The Night Is My Kingdom (1951) - Soeur Gabrielle
- My Wife Is Formidable (1951) - La mère de Sylvia
- Love in the Vineyard (1952) - Léontine Desbordes
- Double or Quits (1953) - Charlotte Nodier
- The Lottery of Happiness (1953) - Mme Lucas
- Les amours finissent à l'aube (1953) - Clémence Guéret
- El torero (1954) - Madre
- Huis clos (1954) - La vieille dame
- La Bande à papa (1956) - Gertrude, la grand-mère
- La garçonne (1957) - Aunt Sylvestre
- Sénéchal the Magnificent (1957) - La malade
- Fumée blonde (1957) - Tante Esther
- Police judiciaire (1958) - Pauline Georges
- Le temps des oeufs durs (1958) - Armande Grillot
- School for Coquettes (1958) - Mme. Bernoux
- La Valse du Gorille (1959) - Hortense
- Les livreurs (1961) - La belle-mère
- Cadavres en vacances (1963) - Blanche Bodin (final film role)

== Bibliography ==
- Greco, Joseph. The File on Robert Siodmak in Hollywood, 1941-1951. Universal-Publishers, 1999.
