= Madame Wants No Children (1926 film) =

1926 film

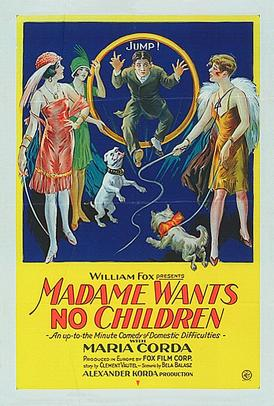
- American release poster
- Directed by: Alexander Korda
- Written by: Béla Balázs; Adolf Lantz
- Based on: Madame ne veut pas d'enfants by Clément Vautel
- Produced by: Karl Freund
- Starring: María Corda; Harry Liedtke; Maria Paudler; Trude Hesterberg
- Cinematography: Robert Baberske; Theodor Sparkuhl
- Music by: Willy Schmidt-Gentner
- Production company: Deutsche Fox
- Distributed by: Fox Film Corporation
- Release date: 14 December 1926
- Running time: 98 minutes
- Country: Weimar Republic
- Languages: Silent; German intertitles

Madame Wants No Children (German: Madame wünscht keine Kinder) is a 1926 German silent drama film directed by Alexander Korda and starring María Corda, Harry Liedtke and Maria Paudler. It is based on the novel Madame ne veut pas d'enfants by the French writer Clément Vautel. The film was made for the American Fox Film Corporation's German subsidiary. The film was shot at Tempelhof Studios in late 1926. It was the last European film Korda made until 1930 as he left for the United States shortly after its production (although an earlier film, A Modern Dubarry, premiered later).

== Cast ==
- María Corda as Elyane Parizot
- Harry Liedtke as Paul
- Maria Paudler as Louise Bonvin
- Trude Hesterberg as Elyane's mother
- Dina Gralla as Lulu, Elyane's sister
- Hermann Vallentin as Paul's uncle
- Camilla von Hollay as Louise's maid
- Olga Mannel as Louise's cook
- Ellen Mueller as Elyane's maid
- Camilla Horn as Dancer
- Marlene Dietrich as Extra
- John Loder as Extra
