= Annette Poivre =

French actress

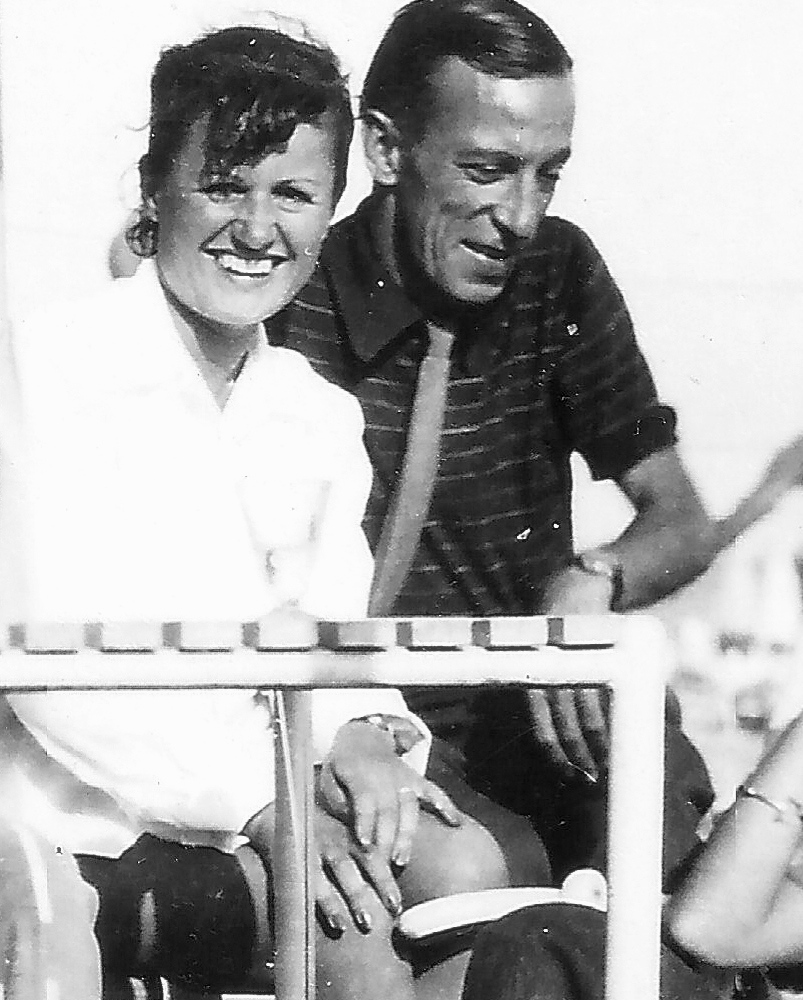
- Raymond Buissière and Annette Poivre filming Fandango in 1948
- Born: 24 June 1917; Paris, France
- Died: 2 June 1988 (aged 70); Paris, France
- Occupation: Actress
- Years active: 1941–1988 (film)

Annette Poivre (24 June 1917 – 2 June 1988) was a French stage and film actress. She was married to the actor Raymond Bussières with whom she sometimes co-starred. Poivre was noted for her comic performances.

== Selected filmography ==
- Premier rendez-vous (1941)
- I Am with You (1943)
- The White Waltz (1943)
- Alone in the Night (1945)
- The Ideal Couple (1946)
- Devil and the Angel (1946)
- Copie conforme (1947)
- Mystery Trip (1947)
- Rumours (1947)
- Antoine and Antoinette (1947)
- Mademoiselle Has Fun (1948)
- The Cupboard Was Bare (1948)
- Fandango (1949)
- Five Red Tulips (1949)
- Branquignol (1949)
- I Like Only You (1949)
- Street Without a King (1950)
- The Little Zouave (1950)
- The New Masters (1950)
- Amédée (1950)
- The Passerby (1951)
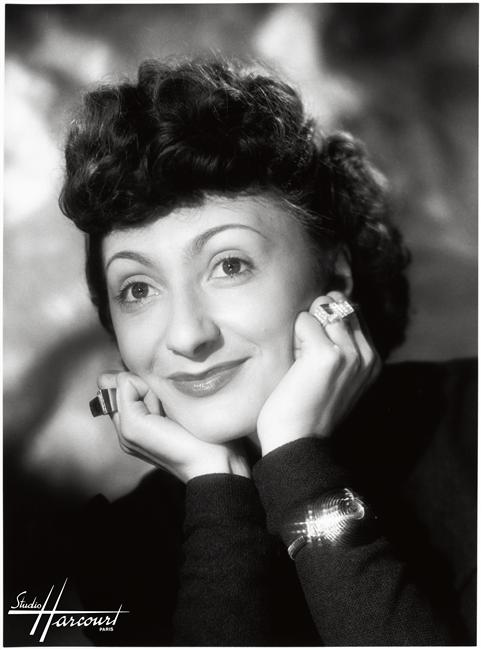
- Annette Poivre in 1944
  A Tale of Five Cities (1951)
- The Passage of Venus (1951)
- Moumou (1951)
- My Wife, My Cow and Me (1952)
- Soyez les bienvenus (1953)
- Le Chevalier de la nuit (1953)
- The Lottery of Happiness (1953)
- The Enchanting Enemy (1953)
- My Brother from Senegal (1953)
- The Pirates of the Bois de Boulogne (1954)
- My Priest Among the Poor (1956)
- Gates of Paris (1957)
- A Friend of the Family (1957)
- Taxi, Roulotte et Corrida (1958)
- Guinguette (1959)
- The Girls of La Rochelle (1962)
- Diamonds Are Brittle (1965)
- The Curse of Belphegor (1967)
- Macédoine (1971)
- C'est pas moi, c'est lui (1980)

== Bibliography ==
- Hayward, Susan. Simone Signoret: The Star as Cultural Sign. Continuum, 2004.
