= Roland Armontel =

French actor (1901–1980)

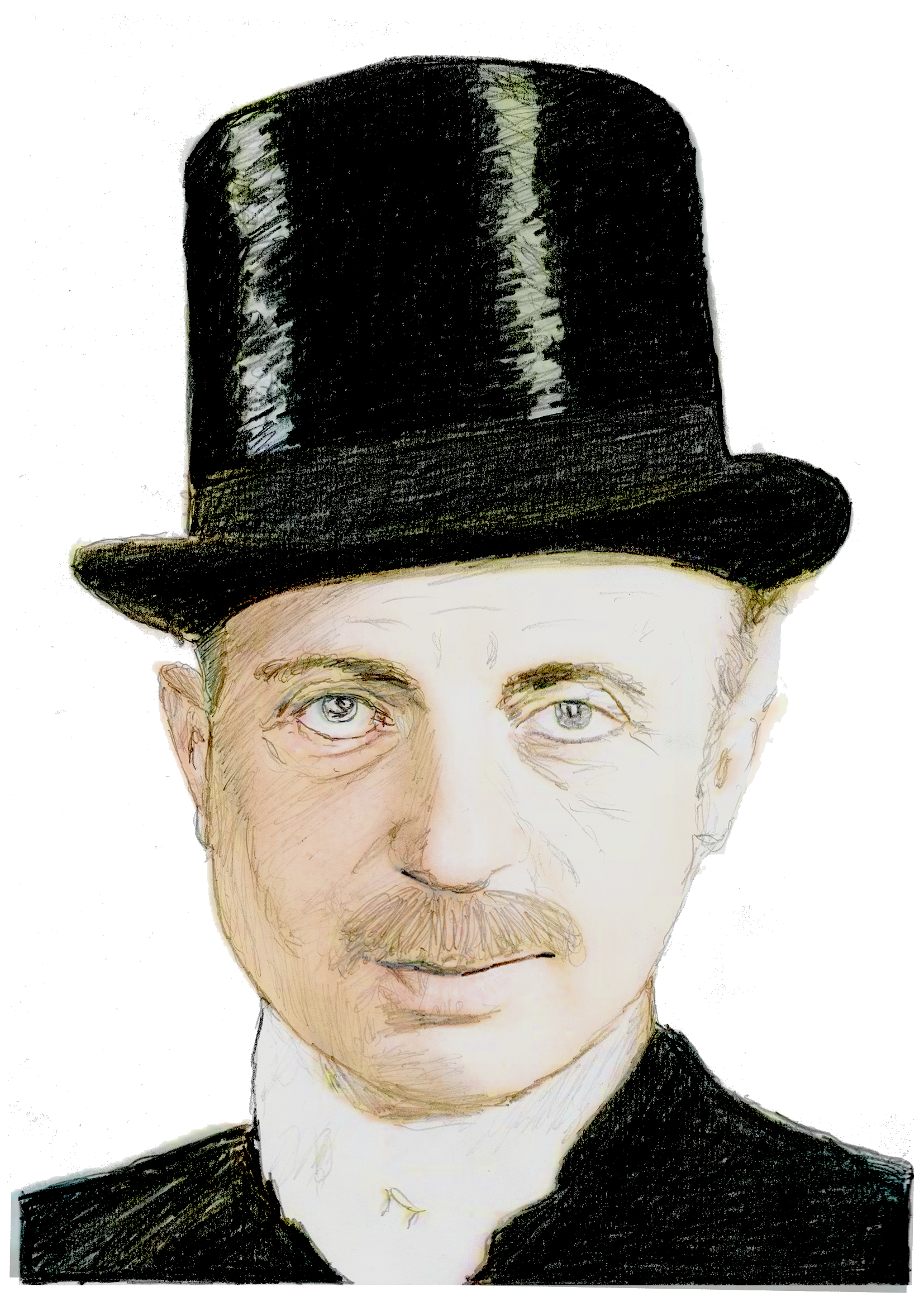
- Born: December 7, 1904; Vimoutiers
- Died: March 2, 1983 (aged 78); Paris
- Occupation: Actor
- Known for: Acting

Roland Armontel (21 December 1901 – 15 March 1980) was a French actor.

Born Auguste Louis Magnin in Vimoutiers, Orne, France, he died in Paris.

== Biography ==
He began his career at a very young age thanks to his grandfather, who owned three traveling theaters. Just a few days after his birth, he “played” the role of the Baby Jesus. Later, his uncle cast him in small roles, such as Cosette in Les Misérables. As a child, he also appeared in films directed by Max Linder.

While performing in the play Arsène Lupin in Brussels, he was advised to move to Paris. He had a difficult start, but he managed to join Louis Verneuil’s Pile ou face troupe alongside Elvire Popesco and was hired by Max Maurey at the Théâtre des Variétés.

On stage, he appeared in numerous plays, including: Le Train pour Venise by Louis Verneuil, Les Jours heureux by Claude-André Puget, Bichon by Jean de Létraz, La Bonne Soupe by Robert Thomas, Messieurs mon mari, Mon bébé, Il faut marier maman, Une femme par jour, and others. As the creator of 129 plays, he played 300 roles on stage during his career .

During the Occupation, he directed the Théâtre de Paris.

In film, he appeared in more than 80 movies between 1932 and 1979. His first major role was in Touchons du bois (1925). In Les Gaîtés de l'escadron, he starred alongside Jean Gabin, Fernandel, and Raimu. Although critics praised him for his role as Célestin in René Clair’s Le silence est d’or (1947), he remained confined to supporting roles.

He is buried in the Arcachon Cemetery (plot 35), a town where he loved to spend his vacations. He was married to Claudette Béroud (1921–2013).

== Selected filmography ==
- Fun in the Barracks (1932) - Barchetti
- Let's Touch Wood (1933) - Jacques de Saint-Preux
- Les Misérables (1934) - Félix Tholomiez (uncredited)
- The Lady of the Camellias (1934) - Gaston
- Dedê (1934) - (uncredited)
- Women's Prison (1938) - Un domestique
- Three Hours (1939) - Un soldat (uncredited)
- Beating Heart (1940) - Firmin (uncredited)
- Miss Bonaparte (1942) - Arsène
- La Symphonie fantastique (1942) - Eugène Delacroix (uncredited)
- Les Petites du quai aux fleurs (1944) - Le professeur
- Florence Is Crazy (1944) - Le professeur Wonder
- Box of Dreams (1945) - Amédée
- Jericho (1946) - Muscat
- The Idiot (1946) - Louliane Timofeievitch Lebediev l'ivrogne
- The Royalists (1947) - Beau-Pied
- Man About Town (1947) - Célestin - un acteur de théâtre
- La maison sous la mer (1947) - Dial
- L'arche de Noé (1947) - Verneuil
- The Three Cousins (1947) - Monsieur de Sainte-Lucie
- The Revenge of Baccarat (1947) - Le comte Artoff
- Rocambole (1947) - Le comte Artoff
- Par la fenêtre (1948) - Sabourdin
- Route sans issue (1948) - Guetz
- Clochemerle (1948) - Ernest Tafardel - l'instituteur
- Emile the African (1948) - Dibier
- Eternal Conflict (1948) - Robert Ariani
- The Tragic Dolmen (1948) - Inspecteur Pauc
- The Lovers of Verona (1949) - Blanchini
- La bataille du feu (1949) - Michel Bonnard
- La vie est un rêve (1949) - M. Brignolet
- The Red Angel (1949) - Le commissaire Martin
- Keep an Eye on Amelia (1949) - Le général Koschnadieff
- Le sorcier du ciel (1949) - Le sacristain
- The Martyr of Bougival (1949) - Le juge d'instruction
- Plus de vacances pour le Bon Dieu (1950) - Michel Angel
- The Dancer of Marrakesh (1950) - Le général
- Minne (1950) - L'oncle Paul
- Without Trumpet or Drum (1950)
- Véronique (1950) - Loustot
- Le gang des tractions-arrière (1950) - Antoine Pluchet
- The Beautiful Image (1951) - Le pharmacien (uncredited)
- Clara de Montargis (1951) - L'ivrogne
- The Passage of Venus (1951) - Gustave Bicquois
- Bouquet of Joy (1951) - Le gendarme
- The Adventures of Mandrin (1952)
- Monsieur Leguignon, Signalman (1952) - M. Maltestu
- La demoiselle et son revenant (1952) - Le pharmacien
- The Fighting Drummer (1952) - Albert Gambier
- Double or Quits (1952) - Chassagne - le père de Marie
- Deux de l'escadrille (1953) - Le général
- The Blonde Gypsy (1953) - Polyte Roux
- Piédalu député (1954) - Vardivol
- Mourez, nous ferons le reste (1954) - Le curé
- Razzia sur la chnouf (1955) - Louis Birot, l'ingénieur-chimiste
- The Affair of the Poisons (1955) - L'aveugle
- Don Juan (1956) - The Governor
- Ces sacrées vacances (1956) - Le deuxième campeur
- The Virtuous Bigamist (1956) - Petit rôle (uncredited)
- Burning Fuse (1957) - Antoine
- Miss Catastrophe (1957) - Eugène
- Tahiti ou la joie de vivre (1957) - Le rédacteur en chef
- Sénéchal the Magnificent (1957) - Carlini
- Three Days to Live (1957) - Alexandre Bérimont
- Quelle sacrée soirée (1957) - James
- His Greatest Role (1957)
- Ni vu, ni connu (1958) - Léon de Chaville
- Les tricheurs (1958) - Le docteur
- Drôles de phénomènes (1959)
- The Indestructible (1959) - Pivois
- Nuits de Pigalle (1959) - Arsène
- Tête folle (1960) - M. Cormont
- Un chien dans un jeu de quilles (1962) - Alexandre - le père
- The Devil and the Ten Commandments (1962) - Mercier (segment "Tes père et mère honoreras")
- Sherlock Holmes and the Deadly Necklace (1962) - Doctor
- Valley of Fear (1962)
- Maigret Sees Red (1963) - Le docteur Fezin
- Tomy's Secret (1963) - Fabien Margoz
- La foire aux cancres (Chronique d'une année scolaire) (1963) - Greuzer
- Is Paris Burning? (1966) - Foot passenger (uncredited)
- Béru et ces dames (1968) - Le supérieur de San Antonio
- Moartea lui Joe Indianul (1968) - Judge Thatcher
- Les Aventures de Tom Sawyer (1968, TV Mini-Series) - Richter Thatcher
- Les aventures de Lagardère (1968) - L'armurier
- Et qu'ça saute! (1970) - Carlos Enriquez
- Perched on a Tree (1971) - Le Père Jean-Marie
- La Bête (1975) - Priest
- Un mari, c'est un mari (1976) - L'amiral
- Le temps des vacances (1979) - Delajambe
