= The Lottery of Happiness =

1953 film by Jean Gehret

- Directed by: Jean Gehret
- Written by: Jean Ferry; Anne Ummel
- Starring: Yves Deniaud; Suzanne Dehelly; Annette Poivre
- Cinematography: André Thomas
- Edited by: Isabelle Elman
- Music by: Paul Bonneau
- Production company: Films Montmorency
- Distributed by: Les Films Fernand Rivers
- Release date: 15 February 1953
- Running time: 90 minutes
- Country: France
- Language: French

The Lottery of Happiness (French: La loterie du bonheur) is a 1953 French comedy film directed by Jean Gehret and starring Yves Deniaud, Suzanne Dehelly and Annette Poivre.

== Cast ==
- Yves Deniaud as Léon Lucas
- Suzanne Dehelly as Mme Lucas
- Annette Poivre as La femme
- Raymond Bussières as Le mari
- Jean-Marc Tennberg as Le fou
- Daniel Lecourtois
- Jane Morlet
- Rivers Cadet
- Georges Bever
- Nathalie Nerval
- Yvonne Yma
- Paul Demange
- Daniel Mendaille
- Georges Paulais
- Michel Salina
- Grégoire Gromoff
- Hugues Wanner
- Huguette Faget
- Simone Cuisin
- Alex Favier
- Beauvais
- Jean Gosselin
- André Besse
- Anne Ummel
- Jean Valmence
- Betty Hoop
- Janine Guiraud
- Nane Germon

== Bibliography ==
- Alfred Krautz. International directory of cinematographers, set- and costume designers in film, Volume 4. Saur, 1984.
