= The Curse of Belphegor =

- Directed by: Georges Combret; Jean Maley
- Screenplay by: Georges Combret; Michel Dubosc; Jean Maley
- Produced by: Georges Combret
- Starring: Raymond Souplex; Raymond Bussières; Noëlle Noblecourt; Maurice Chevit
- Cinematography: Jean-Pierre Coutan-Laboureur
- Edited by: Louis Devaivre
- Music by: Camille Sauvage
- Production companies: Radius Productions; Ital Spettacolo; Produttori Associati Mercato Comune
- Distributed by: Variety Distribution
- Release date: 8 November 1967 (France)
- Running time: 90 minutes
- Countries: France; Italy
- Language: French

The Curse of Belphegor (French: La malédiction de Belphégor, Italian: La mortale trappola di Belfagor) is a 1967 film directed by Georges Combret and Jean Maley and starring Paul Guers, Raymond Souplex and Dominique Boschero.

== Cast ==
- Paul Guers as Fred Daxo
- Raymond Souplex as Inspecteur Legris
- Dominique Boschero as Nadia
- Raymond Bussières as Plumme
- Achille Zavatta as Hubert
- Noëlle Noblecourt as Claude, la journaliste
- Maurice Chevit as Garnier
- Marcel Charvey as Olivier
- Annette Poivre as Mme Plumme
- Jean Daurand as Lefèvre
- Maurice Sarfati as Roger
- Jean Maley as Marc
- Lydia Zavatta

== Production ==
The film was shot at the Toulon Opera in Toulon.

== Release ==
The Curse of Belphegor was distributed in France by Europrodis on 8 November 1967. It was distributed in Italy by Indipendenti Regionali.
