= Georges Flamant =

French actor (1903–1990)

- Born: 3 September 1903; Tunis, French Tunisia
- Died: 23 July 1990 (aged 86); Paris, France
- Occupation: Actor
- Years active: 1931–1959 (film)

Georges Flamant (1903–1990) was a French film actor.

Flamant came to attention for his role as a pimp in Jean Renoir's 1931 film La Chienne where he starred alongside Janie Marèse. He began a relationship with Marèse, but while driving on a holiday in the South of France their car crashed and she was killed. Flamant was widely vilified in the press for his role in the tragedy, and was ostracised by some parts of the film community for several years. He subsequently married the star Viviane Romance, and appeared alongside her in several productions.

His final film performance was in François Truffaut's New Wave drama The 400 Blows in 1959.

== Selected filmography ==
- La Chienne (1931)
- The Faceless Voice (1933)
- The Dying Land (1936)
- The Kings of Sport (1937)
- Women's Prison (1938)
- Gibraltar (1938)
- The Puritan (1938)
- The Strange Monsieur Victor (1938)
- Midnight Tradition (1939)
- Angelica (1939)
- Vénus aveugle (1941)
- A Woman in the Night (1943)
- Eleven Men and a Ball (1948)
- Operation Magali (1953)
- Three Days to Live (1957)
- The 400 Blows (1959)

== Bibliography ==
- Crisp, Colin. French Cinema—A Critical Filmography: Volume 1, 1929-1939. Indiana University Press, 2015.
