= Midnight Tradition =

1939 film

- Directed by: Roger Richebé
- Written by: Jean Aurenche; René Jolivet; Roger Richebé
- Based on: Midnight Tradition by Pierre Mac Orlan
- Produced by: Roger Richebé
- Starring: Viviane Romance; Georges Flamant; Marcel Dalio
- Cinematography: Armand Thirard
- Edited by: Jean Feyte
- Music by: Jean Lenoir
- Production company: Les Films Roger Richebé
- Distributed by: La Société des Films Sirius
- Release date: 22 April 1939
- Running time: 102 minutes
- Country: France
- Language: French

Midnight Tradition (French: La tradition de minuit) is a 1939 French mystery thriller film directed by Roger Richebé and starring Viviane Romance, Georges Flamant and Marcel Dalio. Based on the 1930 novel of the same title by Pierre Mac Orlan, the film was shot at the Neuilly Studios in Paris, and the sets were designed by the art directors René Renoux and Roland Quignon.

== Cast ==
- Viviane Romance as Clara Véry
- Georges Flamant as Claude Thierry
- Marcel Dalio as Édouard Mutter, l'antiquaire
- Marcel Pérès as Louis Fraipont, le boucher
- Mauricette Mercereau as Chéri-Bibi
- Alexandre Rignault as Hortilopitz
- Pierre Larquey as Béatrix
- Léonce Corne as M. Poivre, le patron de Béatrix
- Yves Deniaud as Le bonimenteur
- Georges Malkine as Un gangster
- Jean Brochard as Le commissaire
- Henri Vilbert as Un agent de police

== Bibliography ==
- Bessy, Maurice & Chirat, Raymond. Histoire du cinéma français: 1935-1939. Pygmalion, 1986.
- Crisp, Colin. Genre, Myth and Convention in the French Cinema, 1929-1939. Indiana University Press, 2002.
- Rège, Philippe. Encyclopedia of French Film Directors, Volume 1. Scarecrow Press, 2009.
- Spicer, Andrew & Hanson, Helen. A Companion to Film Noir. John Wiley & Sons, 2013.
