= A Friend of the Family (1957 film) =

1957 film

- Directed by: Jacques Pinoteau
- Written by: Jacques Sommet (play); Jean Girault; Jacques Pinoteau; Jacques Vilfrid
- Produced by: Raymond Bussières; Adry De Carbuccia; Roland Girard
- Starring: Darry Cowl; Raymond Bussières; Annette Poivre
- Cinematography: Pierre Petit
- Edited by: Georges Arnstam
- Music by: Jean Marion
- Production companies: Les Films du Cyclope; Anneray Films
- Distributed by: Discifilm
- Release date: 3 July 1957
- Running time: 90 minutes
- Country: France
- Language: French

A Friend of the Family (French: L'ami de la famille) is a 1957 comedy film directed by Jacques Pinoteau and starring Darry Cowl, Raymond Bussières and Annette Poivre. It was shot at the Photosonor Studios in Paris. The film's sets were designed by the art director Jacques Gut.

== Cast ==
- Darry Cowl as Pierre Bernicaud
- Raymond Bussières as Paul Lemonnier
- Annette Poivre as Annette Lemonnier
- Micheline Dax as Tante Zezette
- Pascale Audret as Monique Lemonnier
- Béatrice Altariba as Sophie
- Jean-Claude Brialy as Philippe Lemonnier
- Robert Berri as Le tueur fou
- Roger Carel as L'accordeur
- Geneviève Cluny as Lola
- Florence Blot as La cuisinière
- Jean Lefebvre as Le jardinier
- Marcel Pérès
- Roger Saget
- Luc Andrieux
- Hubert Deschamps

== Bibliography ==
- Rège, Philippe. Encyclopedia of French Film Directors, Volume 1. Scarecrow Press, 2009.
