= Marthe Mellot =

French actress (1870–1947)

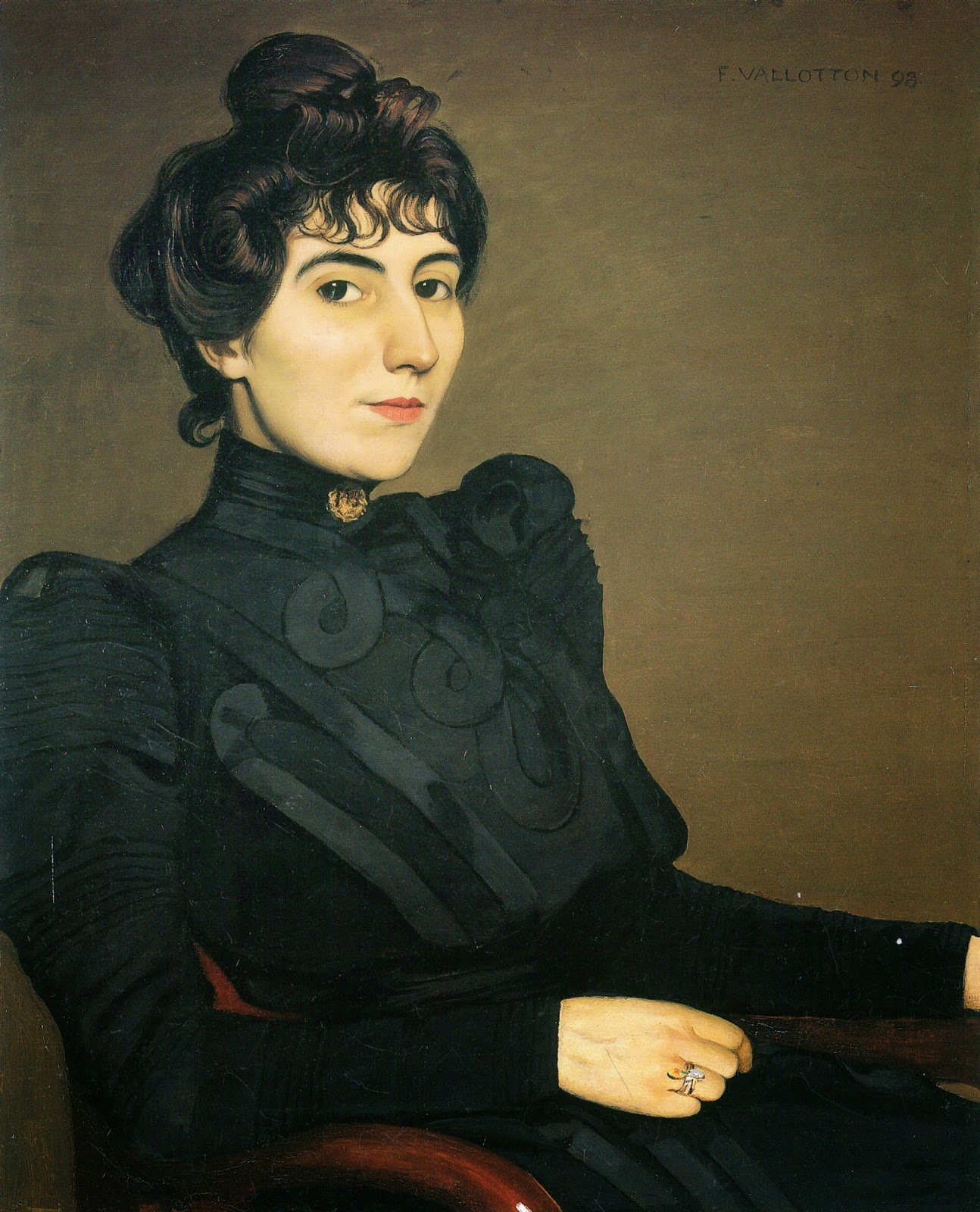
- Portrait of Mellot by Félix Vallotton, 1898
- Born: 16 February 1870; Cosne-Cours-sur-Loire, Nièvre, France
- Died: 13 August 1947 (aged 77); Paris, France
- Occupation: Actress
- Years active: 1934–1947

Signature
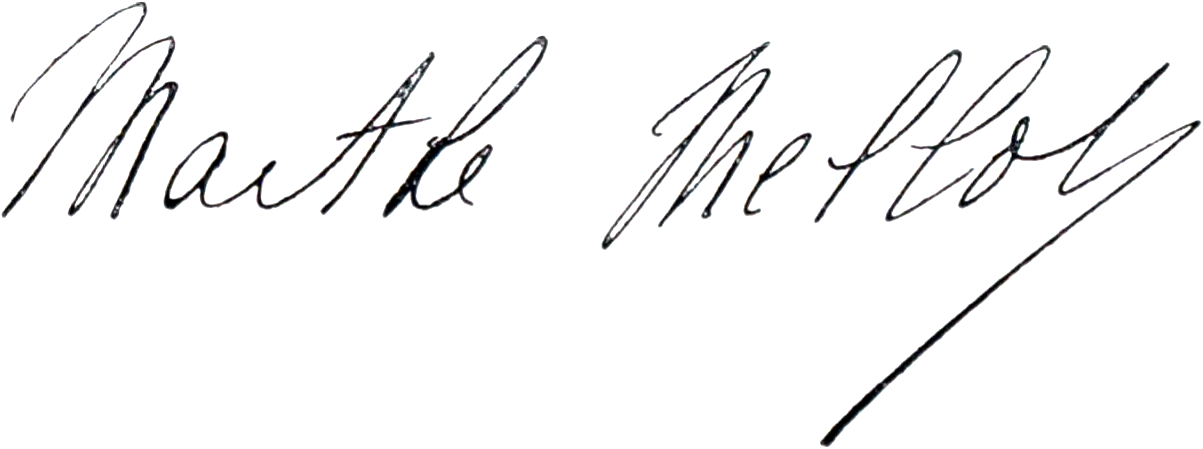

Marthe Mellot (16 February 1870 – 13 August 1947) was a French film actress.

Marthe Mellot was born in Cosne-Cours-sur-Loire, Nièvre, France, and died in Paris.

== Selected filmography ==
- Feu Mathias Pascal (1925)
- That Scoundrel Morin (1932)
- The Red Robe (1933)
- The Two Orphans (1933)
- Les Misérables (1934)
- The Last Billionaire (1934)
- Miquette (1934)
- Madame Bovary (1934)
- Justin de Marseille (1935)
- Woman of Malacca (1937)
- The Citadel of Silence (1937)
- Marthe Richard (1937)
- Captain Benoit (1938)
- Prison sans barreaux (1938)
- Girls in Distress (1939)
- Thérèse Martin (1939)
- Serenade (1940)
- The Chain Breaker (1941)
- The Blue Veil (1942)
- Chiffon's Wedding (1942)
- The Man Who Played with Fire (1942)
- Land Without Stars (1946)
- A Cage of Nightingales (1945)
- The Scarlet Bazaar (1947)
- The Lost Village (1947)
- Vertigo (1947)
