= The Enchanting Enemy =

1953 film by Claudio Gora

- Directed by: Claudio Gora
- Written by: Vittorio Metz; Marcello Marchesi; Jean Bernard-Luc; Edoardo Anton; Age & Scarpelli; Claudio Gora
- Produced by: Jules Borkon; Dario Sabatello
- Starring: Silvana Pampanini
- Cinematography: Leonida Barboni
- Edited by: Stefano Canzio
- Music by: Raffaele Gervaso
- Production companies: Orso Film; Lambor Films
- Release date: 14 June 1953
- Running time: 89 minutes
- Countries: France; Italy
- Language: Italian

The Enchanting Enemy (Italian: L'incantevole nemica) is a 1953 Italian comedy film directed by Claudio Gora and starring Silvana Pampanini, Robert Lamoureux and Carlo Campanini.

The film's sets were designed by the art directors Alberto Boccianti and Oscar D'Amico.

== Plot ==
A wealthy industrialist cheese manufacturer has a paranoid fear of communists and comes to believe that one of his employees is the head of a cell of agents. To keep an eye on him he invites him into his life, even to the extent that he becomes engaged to his attractive daughter.

== Cast ==
- Silvana Pampanini as Silvia
- Robert Lamoureux as Roberto
- Carlo Campanini as Albertini
- Ugo Tognazzi as Direttore della fabbrica
- Pina Renzi as Signora Albertini
- Mita Dover
- Giuseppe Porelli
- Nando Bruno
- Renato Chiantoni
- Nerio Bernardi
- Gianni Agus
- Mario Siletti
- Buster Keaton
- Quartetto Cetra
- Annette Poivre
- Raymond Bussières

== Bibliography ==
- Gundle, Stephen. Fame Amid the Ruins: Italian Film Stardom in the Age of Neorealism. Berghahn Books, 2019.
