= Totò Diabolicus =

- Directed by: Steno
- Written by: Vittorio Metz; Roberto Gianviti; Marcello Fondato; Steno; Giovanni Grimaldi; Bruno Corbucci
- Starring: Totò
- Cinematography: Enzo Barboni
- Music by: Piero Piccioni
- Distributed by: Titanus
- Release date: 1962
- Running time: 92 min
- Country: Italy
- Language: Italian

Totò Diabolicus is a 1962 Italian black comedy film directed by Steno, in which Totò plays six different characters. It is a parody of the giallo genre, as well as of the noir comic book series Diabolik, which debuted the same year.

== Plot ==
Baron Torrealta is murdered by a mysterious assassin known as "Diabolicus". Due to the sizable inheritance, the police suspects the baron's heirs. The mystery deepens, however, as the suspects become targets themselves.

== Cast ==
- Totò: Galeazzo di Torrealta/Carlo di Torrealta/Scipione di Torrealta/Monsignor Antonino di Torrealta/Laudomia di Torrealta/Pasquale Bonocore
- Raimondo Vianello: Michele aka Lallo
- Béatrice Altariba: Diana
- Nadine Sanders: donna Fiore di Torrealta
- Luigi Pavese: police commissioner
- Mario Castellani: inspector Scalarini
- Peppino De Martino: Cocozza
- Steno: Angelo, the gardener
- Franco Giacobini: Dr. Pandoro
- Pietro De Vico: patient
