= Irène Corday =

French actress (1919–1996)

- Born: 8 March 1919; Doussard, Haute-Savoie, France
- Died: 2 September 1996 (aged 87); Meudon, Hauts-de-Seine, France
- Occupation: Actress
- Years active: 1938–1953 (film)

Irène Corday (1919–1996) was a French film actress, who played a mixture of lead and supporting roles. She starred in the title role of Thérèse of Lisieux in Thérèse Martin (1939).

== Selected filmography ==
- Prison sans barreaux (1938)
- Lights of Paris (1938)
- Thérèse Martin (1939)
- The Guardian Angel (1942)
- White Wings (1943)
- First on the Rope (1944)
- My Wife, My Cow and Me (1952)

== Bibliography ==
- Burch, Noël & Sellier, Geneviève. The Battle of the Sexes in French Cinema, 1930–1956. Duke University Press, 2013.
