= Clément Harari =

French actor

- Born: 10 February 1919; Cairo, Egypt
- Died: 16 February 2008 (aged 89); Saint-Cloud, Hauts-de-Seine, France
- Occupation: Actor
- Years active: 1951–2004 (film)
- Relatives: Arthur Harari (grandson)

Clément Harari (10 February 1919 – 16 February 2008) was an Egyptian-born French film and television actor. He is the grandfather of French filmmaker Arthur Harari.

== Selected filmography ==
- It Happened in Paris (1952)
- Ça va barder (1955) - Sammy Kern
- My Priest Among the Poor (1956) - Marchot (uncredited)
- It Happened in Aden (1956) - Abdullah
- La Traversée de Paris (1956) - L'otage à lunettes (uncredited)
- Que les hommes sont bêtes (1957)
- The She-Wolves (1957) - Le préparateur en pharmacie
- Les Espions (1957) - Victor - le faux garçon de café
- Marchands de filles (1957) - L'ivrogne
- Not Delivered (1958) - L'importateur Adrien Osmets
- Tamango (1958) - Cook
- White Cargo (1958) - Un client
- Me and the Colonel (1958) - Man of the Gestapo
- In Case of Adversity (1958) - Un témoin au tribunal (uncredited)
- Double Agents (1959) - Hans
- Arrêtez le massacre (1959) - The dentist
- Le Saint mène la danse (1960) - Archie
- The Long Absence (1961) - Man at Juke Box
- Fanny (1961) - (uncredited)
- La fête espagnole (1961) - Stern
- Cause toujours, mon lapin (1961)
- The Devil and the Ten Commandments (1962) - Un homme de main de Garigny (segment "Homicide point ne seras") (uncredited)
- Le scorpion (1962) - La Fouine
- The Longest Day (1962) - Bit Part (uncredited)
- Five Miles to Midnight (1962) - Mons. Schmidt
- Les Bricoleurs (1963) - Le professeur Hippolyte, l'assassin (uncredited)
- Jeff Gordon, Secret Agent (1963) - Lorenz / Dr Gordon / Dr Mercier
- Charade (1963) - German Tourist (uncredited)
- Les Aventures de Salavin (1964)
- The Gorillas (1964) - Rha-Thé, l'indou magicien
- Sursis pour un espion (1965)
- Passeport diplomatique agent K 8 (1965)
- Secret Agent Fireball (1965) - Geoffrey Home
- The Sleeping Car Murders (1965) - Une 'femme' au bistrot (uncredited)
- Pleins feux sur Stanislas (1965) - L'espion soviétique
- Trap for the Assassin (1966) - Larouette
- Triple Cross (1966) - Losch
- Monkeys, Go Home! (1967) - Emile Paraulis
- Faites donc plaisir aux amis (1969) - Le médecin
- Macédoine (1971) - Un client publicitaire
- Valparaiso, Valparaiso (1971) - Un très méchant
- Défense de savoir (1973)
- Lucky Pierre (1974) - Harry Welsinger
- Nuits Rouges (1974) - Le docteur Dutreuil
- Vous ne l'emporterez pas au paradis (1975) - Franz, le boss
- March or Die (1977) - Bernard (uncredited)
- Little Girl in Blue Velvet (1978) - Volberg
- Once in Paris... (1978) - Abe Wiley
- Les Égouts du paradis (1979) - L'Égyptien
- Ils sont grands, ces petits (1979) - Vladimir, le savant
- Gros-Câlin (1979) - Le professeur Tsourès
- The Fiendish Plot of Dr. Fu Manchu (1980) - Dr. Wretch
- Inspector Blunder (1980) - Dr. Haquenbusch
- Docteur Jekyll et les femmes (1981) - Reverend Guest
- Tais-toi quand tu parles (1981) - Le Professeur
- Flight of the Eagle (1982) - Lachambre
- Tout le monde peut se tromper (1983) - Léon Katz
- La Garce (1984) - Samuel Weber
- Saxo (1988) - Tonia
- Radio Corbeau (1989) - Maxime Katzman - un retraité de la marine marchande
- J'aurais jamais dû croiser son regard (1989) - Max
- Mano rubata (1989)
- Milena (1991)
- La note bleue (1991) - Demogorgon
- Les Clés du paradis (1991) - Le notaire
- Isabelle Eberhardt (1991) - Joue
- Witch Way Love (1997) - Grocer
- Train of Life (1998) - The Rabbi
- Le Grand Rôle (2004) - Le vieux sage
- Dark Inclusion (2016) - Isaac Ulmann (photo)

== Bibliography ==
- André Bazin. Bazin on Global Cinema, 1948-1958. University of Texas Press, 2014.
