= The Idol (1948 film) =

1948 film

- Directed by: Alexander Esway
- Written by: Jean-Paul Le Chanois; Marcel Rivet
- Produced by: François Carron
- Starring: Yves Montand; Albert Préjean; Suzanne Dehelly
- Cinematography: Paul Cotteret
- Edited by: Raymond Louveau
- Music by: Jean Marion
- Production company: Productions Sigma
- Distributed by: Les Films Vog
- Release date: 13 February 1948
- Running time: 90 minutes
- Country: France
- Language: French

The Idol (French: L'idole) is a 1948 French sports drama film directed by Alexander Esway and starring Yves Montand, Albert Préjean and Suzanne Dehelly. It was shot at the François 1er Studios in Paris. The film's sets were designed by the art director Robert-Jules Garnier.

== Synopsis ==
A young woodcutter is recruited by an unscrupulous manager to be a champion boxer. Winning fight after fight he is soon a national sensation and the idol of the people. However he discovers that his victories were all fixed by his manager who now wants him to lose his next fight. Outraged, he does his best to win but is defeated. He announces to the world the truth of his career and then returns to his humble beginnings with the woman who had always loved him for himself rather than his exaggerated role as a public idol.

== Cast ==
- Yves Montand as Fontana
- Albert Préjean as Mitty Joels
- Suzanne Dehelly as Valérie Jourdan
- Danielle Godet as Françoise
- Yves Deniaud as Al Simon
- Pierre Labry as Bender
- Robert Berri as Joe Marchand
- Georges Tourreil as Un journaliste
- Bob Ingarao as Pascal
- Jean Berton as Le garçon de bureau

== Bibliography ==
- Bessy, Maurice & Chirat, Raymond. Histoire du cinéma français: encyclopédie des films, 1940–1950. Pygmalion, 1986
- Rège, Philippe. Encyclopedia of French Film Directors, Volume 1. Scarecrow Press, 2009.
- Harriss, Joseph. Yves Montand: The Passionate Voice. University Press of Kentucky, 2024.
