= Gates of Paris =

Gates of Paris may refer to:

- City gates of Paris, structures and junctions created during 1860 extension of Paris
- Gates of Paris (film), 1957 French-Italian dramatic film, directed by René Clair
