= Me and the Forty Year Old Man =

Moi et les hommes de 40 ans
- Directed by: Jacques Pinoteau
- Written by: Paul Andréota
- Starring: Dany Saval
- Music by: Claude Bolling
- Release date: 1965
- Countries: France; West Germany; Italy
- Language: French

Me and the Forty Year Old Man (French: Moi et les hommes de 40 ans) is a 1965 French film directed by Jacques Pinoteau.

== Cast ==
- Dany Saval as Caroline
- Paul Meurisse as Alexandre Dumourier
- Michel Serrault as Bénéchol
- Paul Hubschmid as Jean-Marc Oesterlin
- Paolo Ferrari as Casserti
- Michel Galabru as Bricaud
- Angelo Bardi as Le chauffeur de Dumourier
- Michèle Bardollet as Ginette
- Maurice Bourbon as Le réceptionniste
- Maurice Coussonneau as Coussonneau
- Jacques David as Le sergent
- Alice Field as Mme de Trévise
- Henri Garcin as Le voisin de Bénéchol
- Guy Jacquet
- Jean-Pierre Moutier as Maxime, le fiancé de Caroline (as J.P. Moutier)
