= Macédoine (film) =

1971 film

- Directed by: Jacques Scandelari
- Written by: Dominique Fabre
- Produced by: Claude Bourillot; Franco Clementi; Raymond Danon; Robert Gascuel
- Starring: Michèle Mercier; Pierre Brasseur; Bernard Fresson; Robert Webber
- Cinematography: Henri Persin
- Edited by: Roger Ikhlef; José Pinheiro
- Music by: Jean-Pierre Bourtayre
- Production companies: Amigos Film; Cinétel; Lira Films
- Distributed by: Valoria Films
- Release date: 20 January 1971
- Running time: 100 minutes
- Countries: France; Italy
- Language: French

Macédoine is a 1971 French-Italian comedy film directed by Jacques Scandelari and starring Michèle Mercier, Pierre Brasseur, Bernard Fresson and Robert Webber. It was shot at the Cinecittà Studios in Rome and on location around Mont Saint-Michel in Normandy.

== Synopsis ==
A major advertising agency decides to create Macédoine, the "ideal woman" who will be become the icon of the era by her universal appeal. They set out to search for the model for this woman and discover he in Catherine, an ordinary factory worker.

== Cast ==
- Michèle Mercier as Catherine
- Pierre Brasseur as Monsieur Dupont
- Bernard Fresson as Roger Vincent
- Robert Webber as Sanderberg
- Cathy Rosier as Hélène
- Venantino Venantini as Brian Goffy
- Xavier Gélin as Le photographe
- Clément Harari as Un client publicitaire
- Florence Blot as Louise
- Raymond Bussières as Le vendeur de journaux
- Bernard Musson as Le planton
- Héléna Manson as La chef d'atelier
- Roger Trapp as L'acteur de pub
- Henri Piégay
- Luigi Cortese
- Micha Bayard
- Hubert Deschamps
- Olivier Hussenot
- Annette Poivre
- Henri Poirier

== Bibliography ==
- Bessy, Maurice, Chirat, Raymond & Bernard, André. Histoire du cinéma français: encyclopédie des films 1966-1970. Pygmalion, 1986.
- Rège, Philippe. Encyclopedia of French Film Directors, Volume 1. Scarecrow Press, 2009.
