= Coral Reefs (film) =

1939 film

- A poster for the film
- Directed by: Maurice Gleize
- Written by: Charles Spaak; Jean Martet (novel)
- Starring: Jean Gabin; Michèle Morgan; Pierre Renoir
- Cinematography: Jules Kruger
- Edited by: Victor De Fast
- Music by: Henri Tomasi
- Production company: UFA
- Distributed by: L'Alliance Cinématographique Européenne (ACE)
- Release date: 1 March 1939
- Running time: 95 minutes
- Country: Germany
- Language: French

Coral Reefs (French title: Le Récif de corail) is a 1939 French-language adventure film made in Germany. Directed by Maurice Gleize, the screenplay was written by Charles Spaak, based on a novel by Jean Martet. The film stars Jean Gabin, Michèle Morgan, and Pierre Renoir. It was shot at the Babelsberg Studios in Berlin. The film's sets were designed by the art director Anton Weber. It tells the story of a wanderer in Australia who kills a man in a fight and goes on the run. He meets a girl who is hiding in the wilds and the two fall in love, but they are pursued by a determined police detective.

== Plot ==
In Brisbane, Ted Lennard kills a criminal in a struggle and manages to get aboard the Portland, a cargo ship bound for Mexico. On the way the vessel stops at Togobu, an unclaimed coral reef inhabited by a few happy Polynesians and an Englishman who hates civilization. On arrival at Mexico, money is missing from the captain's cabin and Ted is confined in the hold. When the money is found, the ship is back at Brisbane and Ted is released with apologies. He heads up country to avoid arrest, but in a café is seen by Abboy, a dogged police detective. Taking to the wild, he comes across an isolated cabin occupied by a young woman, Lilian. She lets him stay and, as they gradually become fond of each other, he suggests they escape to Togobu. Then one day Abboy appears. He tells Ted that he is no longer wanted for murder, but Lilian is. She runs away to the nearest town, which is in the grip of an influenza epidemic, and falls ill. Ted tracks her down, but so does Abboy. The policeman uses his authority to get her special treatment and she eventually recovers. Ted meanwhile has been working hard and has earned enough for two rail tickets to Brisbane. In the harbour they find the Portland, and ask the captain if he will take them to Togobu. Out of the shadows steps Abboy, who decides that Lilian died in the epidemic and his case is closed.

== Main cast ==
- Jean Gabin as Ted Lennard
- Michèle Morgan as Lilian White
- Pierre Renoir as Abboy
- Saturnin Fabre as Hobson
- Gina Manès as Maria
- Jenny Burnay as Anna
- Julien Carette as Havelock
- Louis Florencie as Captain Jolifé
- Guillaume de Sax as Springbett
- René Bergeron as Jim
- Gaston Modot as Mexican colonel
- Pierre Magnier as a doctor
- Léonce Corne as a hotelier
- Yves Deniaud as a shopkeeper

== Preservation ==
Long presumed to be lost, the film was sought after by Serge Bromberg who found a copy at the Yugoslav Film Archive in Belgrade in 2002. The film was then restored in coordination with the Archives françaises du film and re-released.
