= Gates of Paris (film) =

Porte des Lilas Gates of Paris
- Directed by: René Clair
- Screenplay by: René Clair; Jean Aurel
- Based on: La Grande ceinture by René Fallet
- Produced by: René Clair; André Daven
- Starring: Pierre Brasseur; Georges Brassens; Henri Vidal; Dany Carrel
- Cinematography: Robert Lefebvre
- Edited by: Louisette Hautecoeur
- Music by: Georges Brassens
- Distributed by: Cinédis (France); Lopert Pictures Corporation (U.S.)
- Release dates: 20 September 1957 (Italy); 25 September 1957 (France)
- Running time: 95 minutes
- Countries: France; Italy
- Language: French

Porte des Lilas (English: Gate of Lilacs) is a 1957 French-Italian crime drama film directed by René Clair, based on René Fallet's novel La Grande ceinture. The film is known as both Gates of Lilacs and The Gates of Paris, but was released under the latter title in the United States.

== Plot ==
Pierre Barbier is a convicted criminal accused of murder and wanted by the police. Hungry and sick, he finds refuge with a kind-hearted boy known as "The Artist." His unexpected arrival disrupts the lives of three inhabitants of the working-class neighborhood of Porte des Lilas in eastern Paris. First, there's the Artist, who struggles with the presence of the outlaw in his home but tries to help him get proper documentation. Then there's Juju, a lazy, alcoholic man who admires Barbier. Lastly, there's Maria, who suspects a secret and sneaks into the Artist's house to find Barbier. He deceives her in a vile manner, which infuriates Juju, who is in love with her. In the end, Juju commits a crime by killing the man who ruined his dreams.

== Cast ==
- Pierre Brasseur as Juju
- Georges Brassens as Artiste
- Henri Vidal as Pierre Barbier
- Dany Carrel as Maria
- Raymond Bussières as Alphonse
- Gabrielle Fontan as Madame Sabatier
- Amédée as Paulo - a regular at the café
- Annette Poivre as Nénette
- Alain Bouvette as Paulo's friend
- Alice Tissot as the concierge
- Paul Préboist

== Awards ==
The film was nominated for the Academy Award for Best Foreign Language Film and a BAFTA Award in 1958 and won the Bodil Award for Best European Film.

== See also ==
- List of submissions to the 30th Academy Awards for Best Foreign Language Film
- List of French submissions for the Academy Award for Best Foreign Language Film
