= My Priest Among the Rich (1952 film) =

1952 film

- Directed by: Henri Diamant-Berger
- Written by: Jean-Pierre Feydeau; André Hornez
- Based on: My Priest Among the Rich by Clément Vautel
- Produced by: Henri Diamant-Berger; Albert Dodrumez
- Starring: Yves Deniaud; Robert Arnoux; Raymond Bussières
- Cinematography: Victor Arménise
- Edited by: Hélène Basté
- Music by: Francis Lopez
- Production company: Union des Distributeurs Indépendants
- Distributed by: Compagnie Commerciale Française Cinématographique
- Release date: 26 September 1952
- Running time: 98 minutes
- Country: France
- Language: French

My Priest Among the Rich (French: Mon curé chez les riches) is a 1952 French comedy film directed by Henri Diamant-Berger and starring Yves Deniaud, Robert Arnoux and Raymond Bussières. It was shot at the Neuilly Studios in Paris. The film's sets were designed by the art director Roger Briaucourt. It is based on the 1923 novel of the same title by Clément Vautel, which has been made into films several times. It was followed by a sequel My Priest Among the Poor , also directed by Diamant-Berger, in 1956.

== Cast ==
- Yves Deniaud as L'abbé Pellegrin
- Robert Arnoux as Emile Cousinet
- Raymond Bussières as La Goupille
- Germaine Reuver as Valérie
- Marcel André as Sableuse
- Georges Tabet as Le docteur
- Jean Danet as Le vicomte Pierre de Sableuse
- Nora Costes as Marianne
- Léonce Corne as Dupont-Mauvais
- Jean Debucourt as Monseigneur Sibué
- Lysiane Rey as Lisette Cousinet
- Marianne Hardy as Eugénie
- Luc Andrieux as Brochut
- Denise Kerny as Mme Michaut

== Bibliography ==
- Faulkner, Sally (ed.) Middlebrow Cinema. Routledge, 2016.
- Goble, Alan. The Complete Index to Literary Sources in Film. Walter de Gruyter, 1999.
- Rège, Philippe. Encyclopedia of French Film Directors, Volume 1. Scarecrow Press, 2009.
