= Jean Gehret =

- Born: 10 January 1900; Geneva, Switzerland
- Died: 24 May 1956 (aged 56); Paris, France
- Occupations: Actor, Director

Jean Gehret (10 January 1900, Geneva, Switzerland - 24 May 1956, Paris, France) was an actor and director, appearing in a few films directed by Jean Renoir, including La Chienne (1931) and Madame Bovary (1933).

== Filmography ==
Year	Title	Role	Notes
1931	La Chienne	Monsieur Dugodet	
1932	Baleydier	Bloch	
1932	Night at the Crossroads	Emile Michonnet	
1932	Boudu Saved from Drowning	Vigour	
1932	Moune et son notaire	Le docteur Belotte	
1933	Cent mille francs pour un baiser	Bourdin	
1934	Madame Bovary	Minor Role	Uncredited
1935	Crime and Punishment		Uncredited
1943	Adieu Léonard		Uncredited, (final film role)
1947	Clockface Café		Director
1949	Summer Storm		Director
1949	Tabusse		Director
1950	Le Crime des justes		Director
1953	The Lottery of Happiness		Director
