= Geneviève Cluny =

French actress

- Born: 18 April 1928 (age 98); Bressuire, Deux-Sèvres, France
- Occupation: Actress
- Years active: 1954-1973 (film)

Geneviève Cluny (born 18 April 1928) is a former French film actress. She appeared in both French New Wave films as well as popular mainstream commercial productions during the 1950s and 1960s. She is credited for the basic idea on which Jean-Luc Godard's A Woman Is a Woman was based.

== Selected filmography ==
- My Priest Among the Poor (1956)
- A Friend of the Family (1957)
- Les Cousins (1959)
- Witness in the City (1959)
- The Love Game (1960)
- The Joker (1960)
- It Can't Always Be Caviar (1961)
- This Time It Must Be Caviar (1961)
- The Merry Widow (1962)
- People in Luck (1963)
- If You Go Swimming in Tenerife (1964)
- Agent 505: Death Trap in Beirut (1965)
- House of Cards (1968)

== Bibliography ==
- Marie, Michel. The French New Wave: An Artistic School. John Wiley & Sons, 2008.
