= Alexander Esway =

Hungarian-born film director, screenwriter, and producer (1895–1947)

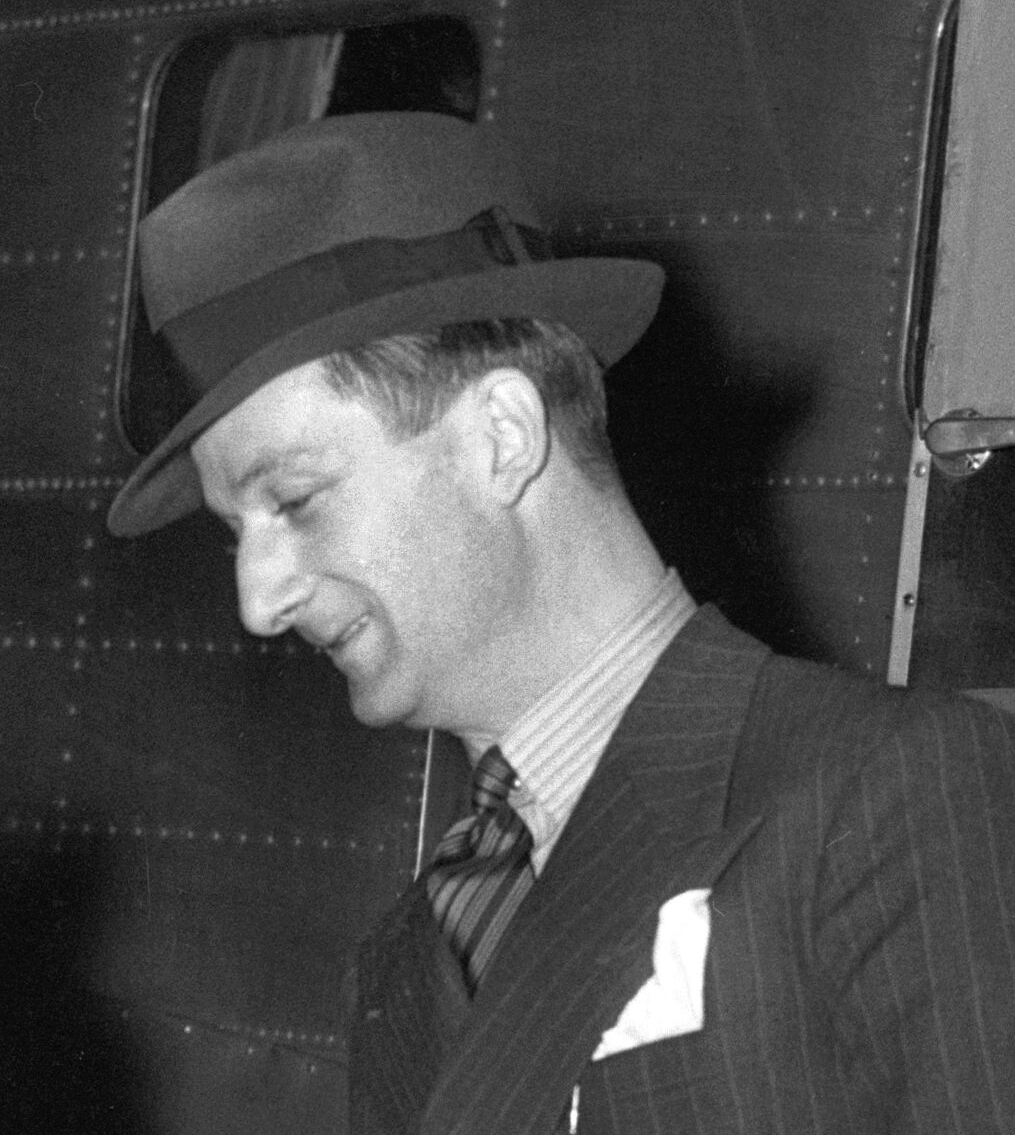
- Esway in 1936
- Born: Sándor Ezry; 20 January 1895; Budapest, Hungary
- Died: 23 August 1947 (aged 52); St. Tropez, France
- Other name: Alexandre Esway
- Occupations: Film director, screenwriter, producer

Alexander Esway (20 January 1895 – 23 August 1947) was a Hungarian-born film director, screenwriter, and producer.

== Life and career ==
Esway was born Sándor Ezry in Budapest. In the late 1920s and early 1930s he worked as a director and screenwriter, first in Germany and then in the UK. He began working primarily in France from 1933, although he also continued to work in the UK where he set up a short-lived production company, Atlantic Film Productions, in 1935. The company's only production was Thunder in the City, starring Edward G. Robinson. During World War II, he worked in Hollywood on Allied propaganda films, most notably, The Cross of Lorraine. After the war, he returned to France where he made his last two films: the two-part war film Le Bataillon du ciel, based on the book of the same name by Joseph Kessel, and L'Idole, starring Yves Montand. Esway died in St. Tropez at the age of 52.

== Filmography ==
Director

- Herkules Maier (1927)
- The Lady with the Mask (1928)
- Taxi for Two, co-directed with Denison Clift (1929)
- Children of Chance (1930)
- Shadows (1931)
- Children of Fortune (1931)
- Le Jugement de minuit, co-directed with André Charlot (1932)
- Une vie perdue, co-directed with Raymond Rouleau (1933)
- Mauvaise Graine, co-directed with Billy Wilder (1934)
- It's a Bet (1934)
- Music Hath Charms (1935), co-directed with Thomas Bentley, Walter Summers, and Arthur B. Woods
- Hercule, co-directed with Carlo Rim (1937)
- Barnabé (1938)
- Education of a Prince (1938, remake of the 1927 silent film Éducation de Prince)
- Latin Quarter, co-directed with Pierre Colombier and Christian Chamborant (1939)
- L'Homme qui cherche la vérité (1939)
- Monsieur Brotonneau (1939)
- Conquest of the Air, semi-dramatised documentary co-directed with Zoltan Korda, John Monk Saunders, William Cameron Menzies, Donald Taylor, and Alexander Shaw (1940)
- Steppin' in Society (1945)
- Le Bataillon du ciel (1946)
- The Idol (1948)

Screenwriter

- Die Dame mit der Maske, directed by Wilhelm Thiele (1928)
- Taxi for Two, directed by Esway and Denison Clift (1929)
- The Cross of Lorraine, directed by Tay Garnett (1943)

Producer

- Thunder in the City, directed by Marion Gering (1937)
- Shadows, directed by Esway (1931)
