= My Priest Among the Rich (novel) =

1923 novel

- Author: Clément Vautel
- Language: French
- Genre: Comedy
- Publisher: Éditions Albin Michel
- Publication date: 1923
- Publication place: France
- Media type: Print
- Pages: 313

My Priest Among the Rich (French: Mon curé chez les riches) is a 1923 comedy novel by the Belgian-born French author Clément Vautel. It was published in Paris by Albin Michel. It was followed by a sequel My Priest Among the Poor in 1925. The same year it was adapted for the stage by Vautel.

== Film adaptations ==
- My Priest Among the Rich (1925 film), a French silent film directed by Émile-Bernard Donatien
- My Priest Among the Rich (1932 film), a French sound film remake film directed by Émile-Bernard Donatien
- My Priest Among the Rich (1938 film), a French film directed by Jean Boyer
- My Priest Among the Rich (1952 film), a French film directed by Henri Diamant-Berger

== Bibliography ==
- Goble, Alan. The Complete Index to Literary Sources in Film. Walter de Gruyter, 1999.
- Pierrard, Pierre. Un siècle de l'Eglise de France: 1900-2000. Desclée de Brouwer, 2000.
- Willy, Lawrence R. The Third Sex. University of Illinois Press, 2010.
