= Prison sans barreaux =

1938 film by Léonide Moguy

Prison sans barreaux (lit. Prison Without Bars) is a 1938 French film directed by Léonide Moguy. It is set in a reformatory for young girls.

It was awarded the Cup of the Ministry of Popular Culture (Coppa del Ministero per la Cultura Popolare) at the 6th Venice International Film Festival and was remade by Alex Korda.

== Cast ==
- Irène Corday
- Annie Ducaux as Yvonne
- Roger Duchesne as Guy Maréchal
- Annie France
- Élina Labourdette
- Ginette Leclerc as Renée
- Corinne Luchaire as Nelly
- Maximilienne as Mrs. Appel
- Marthe Mellot as Mrs. Renard
- Marguerite Pierry as Pauline
- Gisèle Préville as Alice
- Madeleine Suffel as the servant
