= Five Red Tulips =

1949 film

- Directed by: Jean Stelli
- Written by: Charles Exbrayat; Marcel Rivet
- Produced by: Raymond Borderie
- Starring: René Dary; Suzanne Dehelly; Raymond Bussières
- Cinematography: Marcel Grignon
- Edited by: Madame Lamart
- Music by: René Sylviano
- Production company: CICC
- Distributed by: Les Films Corona
- Release date: 23 March 1949
- Running time: 97 minutes
- Country: France
- Language: French

Five Red Tulips (French: Cinq tulipes rouges) is a 1949 French crime film directed by Jean Stelli and starring René Dary, Suzanne Dehelly and Raymond Bussières. It was shot at the Billancourt Studios in Paris and on location around the city and across France. The film's sets were designed by the art director Jacques Colombier.

== Synopsis ==
During the Tour de France, five riders are murdered. Each body is left with a red tulip nearby. A journalist and a police inspector investigate and arrest the murderer at the race's conclusion at the Parc des Princes in Paris.

== Cast ==
- René Dary as Pierre Lusanne
- Suzanne Dehelly as Colonelle
- Raymond Bussières as Albert 'La Puce' Jacquin
- Pierre-Louis as Charolles
- Robert Berri as Jacques Mauval
- Robert Le Fort as Basile
- Emilio Carrer as Gambarra
- Robert Blome as Jef Dooksen
- René Robert
- Luc Andrieux as Charles Brugeat
- Roger Bontemps as Un reporter
- Marian]
- Jean-Jacques Lécot
- Claude Larry
- Bob d'Arcy
- Jean Debray as Tonnelier
- Jean Nosserot as Fuseau
- Émile Genevois as Robert
- Coussolle]
- Orgaert
- Marcel Loche
- René Hell
- Edith Guarini
- Annette Poivre as Annette Jacquin
- Jean Brochard as L'inspecteur-chef Honoré Ricoul
- Albert Broquin as Un mécano
- Maguy Horiot
- Frédéric Mariotti as Un inspecteur
- Jacques Mattler as Le directeur de la P.J.
- Fernand Mithouard as Max Everkampf
- Marcelle Rexiane as La caissière
- René Stern as Le maître d'hôtel

== See also ==
- List of films about bicycles and cycling

== Bibliography ==
- Rège, Philippe. Encyclopedia of French Film Directors, Volume 1. Scarecrow Press, 2009.
