= Maurice Gleize =

French screenwriter and film director

- Born: 4 April 1898; Enghien-les-Bains, Val-d'Oise; France
- Died: 5 November 1974 (aged 76); Brive-la-Gaillarde, Corrèze, France
- Other name: Maurice Louis Gleize
- Occupations: Film director, Writer
- Years active: 1923-1951 (film)

Maurice Gleize (1898–1974) was a French screenwriter and film director.

== Selected filmography ==
=== Director ===
- The Red Night (1923)
- Madonna of the Sleeping Cars (1928)
- A Hen on a Wall (1936)
- Coral Reefs (1939)
- The Suitors Club (1941)
- Sowing the Wind (1944)
- The Passage of Venus (1951)

=== Screenwriter ===
- Thérèse Martin (1939)

== Bibliography ==
- Hayward, Susan. French National Cinema. Routledge, 2006.
