= Roger Richebé =

French film director, screenwriter and producer

Roger Richebé (3 December 1897 – 10 July 1989), born Roger Gustave Richebé, was a French film director, screenwriter, and producer. He was born in Marseille and died in Ville-d'Avray.

== Selected filmography ==
- L'Homme qui assassina (1930) (producer)
- La donna di una notte (1930) (producer)
- On purge bébé (1931) (producer – uncredited)
- Queen of the Night (1931)
- La Chienne (1931) (producer – as Les Etablissement Branuberger-Richebé)
- Mam'zelle Nitouche (1931) (producer)
- The Lovers of Midnight (1931) (producer)
- American Love (1931) (producer)
- Fantômas (1932) (producer)
- Fanny (1932) (producer)
- Baleydier (1932) (producer)
- The Agony of the Eagles (1933) (director)
- Minuit, place Pigalle (1934) (director)
- I Have an Idea (1934) (director)
- Koenigsmark (1935) (producer)
- L'amant de Madame Vidal (1936) (producer)
- The Secret of Polichinelle (1936) (producer)
- Le mort en fuite (1936) (producer)
- The Green Jacket (1937) (producer)
- The Cheat (1937) (producer)
- A Picnic on the Grass (1937) (producer)
- Women's Prison (1938) (writer)
- Midnight Tradition (1939) (writer)
- Happy Days (1941) (producer)
- Madame Sans-Gêne (1941) (writer and producer)
- Romance for Three (1942) (writer and producer)
- Monsieur La Souris (1942) (producer)
- Angels of Sin (1943) (producer)
- Domino (1943) (director)
- Voyage Without Hope (1943) (producer)
- Les J3 (1946) (producer)
- The Great Maguet (1947) (director)
- Jean de la Lune (1949) (producer)
- Monseigneur (1949) (writer and producer)
- Gigolo (1951) (producer)
- Clara de Montargis (1951) (producer)
- La Fugue de Monsieur Perle (1952) (co-director and co-writer)
- The Lovers of Midnight (1953) (producer)
- The Little Czar (1954) (producer)
- Sophie and the Crime (1955) (producer)
- The Wages of Sin (1956) (producer)
- Élisa (1957) (director)
- Que les hommes sont bêtes (1957) (writer and producer)
