= René Fallet =

French writer

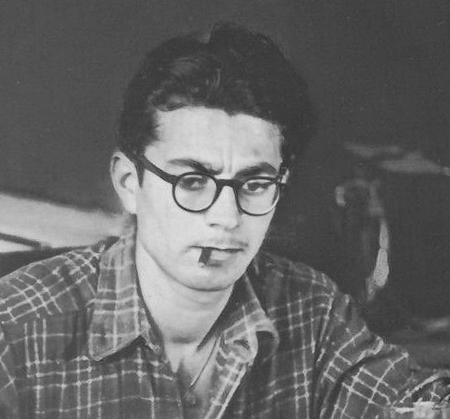
- Fallet in 1949
- Born: 4 December 1927; Villeneuve-Saint-Georges, France
- Died: 25 July 1983 (aged 55); Paris, France
- Occupation: Writer
- Writing career
- Language: French

René Fallet (4 December 1927 – 25 July 1983) was a 20th-century French writer.

He wrote a novel that the 1981 film La Soupe aux choux was later based on.

== Main novels ==
- Banlieue sud-est (1946)
- Le Braconnier de Dieu (1973)

== Selected filmography ==
- The Love of a Woman (1953)
- The Gates of Paris (1957)
- Monsieur Robinson Crusoe (1960)
- Le Braconnier de Dieu (1983)
