= Clément Vautel =

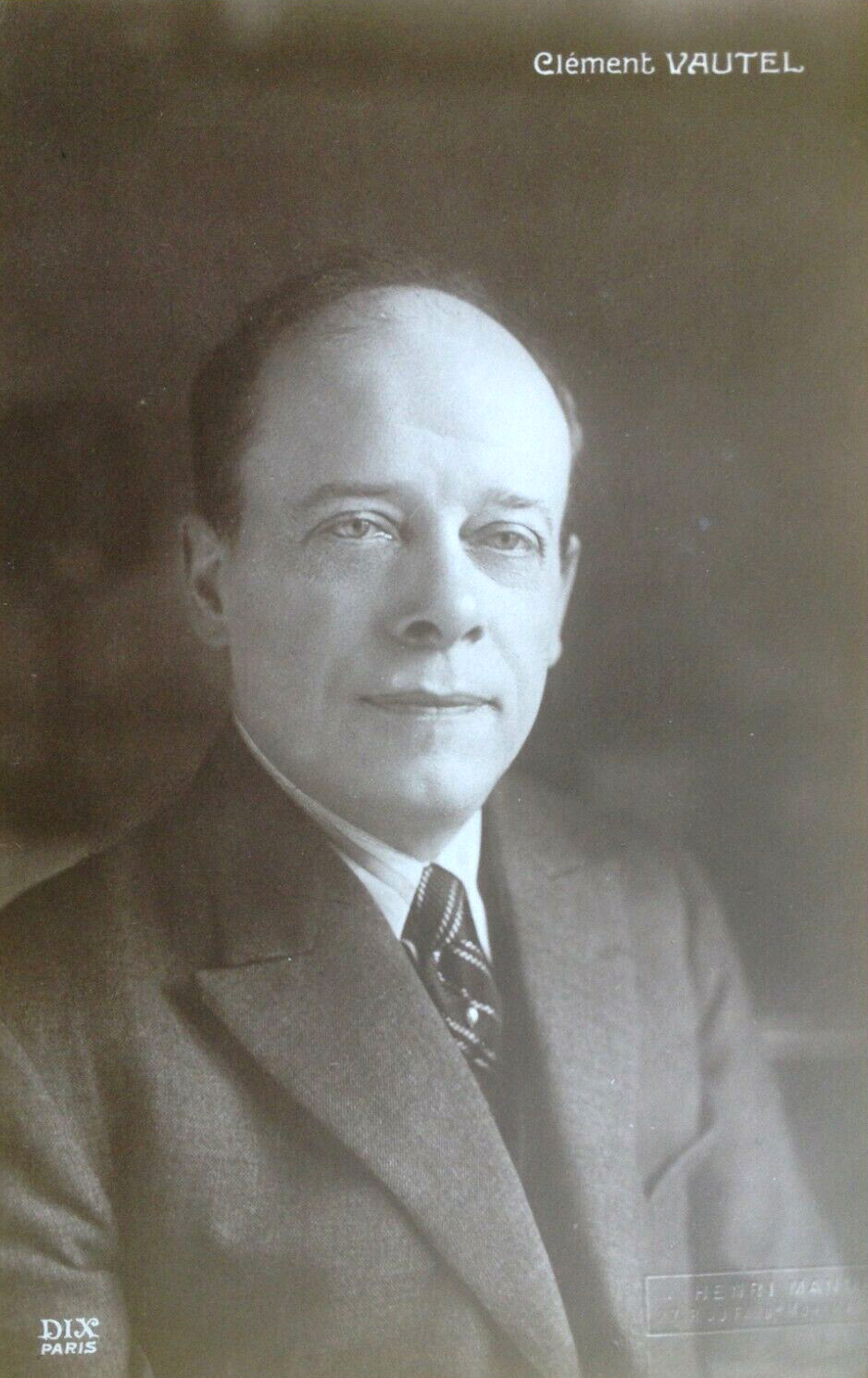
- Born: Clément-Henri Vaulet; 31 January 1876; Tournai
- Died: 23 December 1954 (aged 78); Paris
- Occupations: Journalist; Novelist; Dramatist

Clément Vautel, pen name of Clément-Henri Vaulet (31 January 1876 – 23 December 1954) was a journalist, novelist and playwright of Belgian origin, naturalized French (1897).

== Biography ==
Clément Vautel wrote for numerous periodicals, including Le Charivari, La Liberté, Gil Blas, La Presse, Le Rire, La Vie illustrée, Le Matin (from 1908 to 1914), Le Journal (from 1918 to 1940), Cyrano...

== Publications ==
- 1919: La Réouverture du paradis terrestre, novel
- 1921: Les Folies bourgeoises, novel
- 1922: Mademoiselle Sans-gêne, novel
- 1922: Monsieur Palémon chez les Dingos, novel
- 1923: Candide, 5-act play
- 1923: La Machine à fabriquer des rêves
- 1923: My Priest Among the Rich, novel, Albin Michel
- 1924: Madame ne veut pas d'enfant, novel
- 1925: Mon curé chez les pauvres, novel, Albin Michel
- 1926: Je suis un affreux bourgeois, novel
- 1927: L'Amour à la parisienne, novel
- 1928: Le Bouif chez mon curé, written with Georges de La Fouchardière, novel
- 1928: Voyage au pays des snobs
- 1929: La Grande rafle, written with Georges de La Fouchardière, novel
- 1930: Autour et alentour
- 1930: L'Empereur aux yeux bleus, historical novel, written with Raymond Escholier
- 1932: Les Femmes aux enchères, novel
- 1934: La Petite-fille de Madame Angot, novel
- 1939: Le Fou de l'Élysée, pamphlet novel
- 1941 « Mon film », souvenirs d'un journaliste
- 1942: Candide Paturot à la recherche d'un idéal, petite histoire contemporaine
- 1946: Le Prince impérial, histoire du fils de Napoléon III
- 1949: M. Désiré Jolibois au paradis
- 1951: Les Maris, les Amants et la Femme, histoire des cocus célèbres depuis les temps les plus reculés jusqu'à nos jours
- 1952: Le Bon Sens et la Vie

== Cinema ==
=== Scripts ===
- 1920: Monsieur Lebureau by Luitz-Morat
- 1927: Parisian Pleasures by Joe Francis

=== Adaptations ===
- 1925: Mon curé chez les riches by Émile-Bernard Donatien
- 1925: Mon curé chez les pauvres by Donatien
- 1926: Madame Wants No Children by Alexander Korda
- 1932: Mon curé chez les riches by Donatien
- 1933: Madame Wants No Children by Hans Steinhoff
- 1938: Mon curé chez les riches by Jean Boyer
- 1952: My Priest Among the Rich by Henri Diamant-Berger
- 1956: Mon curé chez les pauvres by Henri Diamant-Berger
