= Rocambole =

Rocambole may refer to:

== Botany ==
- The sand leek, Allium scorodoprasum
- An alternative name for the shallot, Allium ascalonium
- A variety of Hardneck garlic, Allium sativum var. ophioscorodon

== Other uses ==
- Rocambole (character), created by Pierre Alexis Ponson du Terrail as the main character of a series published in daily newspapers between 1857 and 1870
  - Rocambole (1948 film), a 1948 French-Italian historical thriller film starring Ponson du Terrail's character
  - Rocambole (French TV series), a 1964 French drama
- Rocambole (Mexican TV series), Mexican telenovela
- Rocambole, a section of Stay-behind in Norway
- A Brazilian variant of Swiss roll
