= The Revenge of Baccarat =

- Directed by: Jacques de Baroncelli
- Written by: André-Paul Antoine; Pierre Alexis Ponson du Terrail (novel); Léon Roth
- Produced by: André Paulvé
- Starring: Pierre Brasseur; Sophie Desmarets; Lucien Nat
- Cinematography: Léonce-Henri Burel; Giuseppe Caracciolo
- Edited by: Claude Ibéria
- Music by: Renzo Rossellini
- Production companies: Films André Paulvé; Scalera Film
- Distributed by: DisCina; Scalera Film
- Release dates: 25 February 1948 (Italy); 23 April 1948 (France)
- Running time: 105 minutes
- Countries: France; Italy
- Language: French

The Revenge of Baccarat (French: La revanche de Baccarat) is a 1948 French-Italian historical thriller film directed by Jacques de Baroncelli and starring Pierre Brasseur, Sophie Desmarets and Lucien Nat. It portrays the adventures of the popular character Rocambole. It was a sequel to the film Rocambole (1948). It was the director's final film of a lengthy career.

The film was shot at the Scalera Studios in Rome with sets designed by the art directors René Moulaert and Ottavio Scotti. The film's costume were designed by Marcel Escoffier.

== Main cast ==
- Pierre Brasseur as Joseph Flippart dit 'Rocambole'
- Sophie Desmarets as La comtesse Artoff dite 'Baccarat'
- Lucien Nat as Andrea
- Robert Arnoux as Ventura
- Loredana as Carmen de Montevecchio
- Roland Armontel as Le comte Artoff
- Marcel Delaître as Le docteur Blanche / il dottore Blanche
- Carla Candiani as Fanny
- Vittorio Sanipoli as Arnaud, comte de Chamery
- Ernesto Sabbatini as Le marquis de Montevecchio
- Ginette Roy as Cerise

== Bibliography ==
- Dayna Oscherwitz & MaryEllen Higgins. The A to Z of French Cinema. Scarecrow Press, 2009.
