= Jacks of Hearts Club =

Criminal group in the Russian Empire

The Jacks of Hearts Club (Russian: Клуб Червонных Валетов) was a criminal organization that operated in the Russian Empire in 1871-1875 with the goal, as the court declared, of "stealing other people’s property through luring, forged documents, and deception". Their trial was an unprecedented case in Russia in that the majority of a large crime group were of Russian nobility, and also included other elites, such as wealthy merchants. Even one member of higher aristocracy, knyaz Vsevolod Dolgorukov, was indicted. The case involved about 50 defendants and over 300 witnesses. Dozens of criminal episodes were considered, mostly of fraud and forgery, but also one case of murder. The name of the group comes from the 1858 Rocambole picaresque novel Le Club des Valets de Coeur by Pierre Alexis Ponson du Terrail.
