= Bagne of Toulon =

French prison (1748–1873)

Coordinates: 43.1180°N 5.9287°E

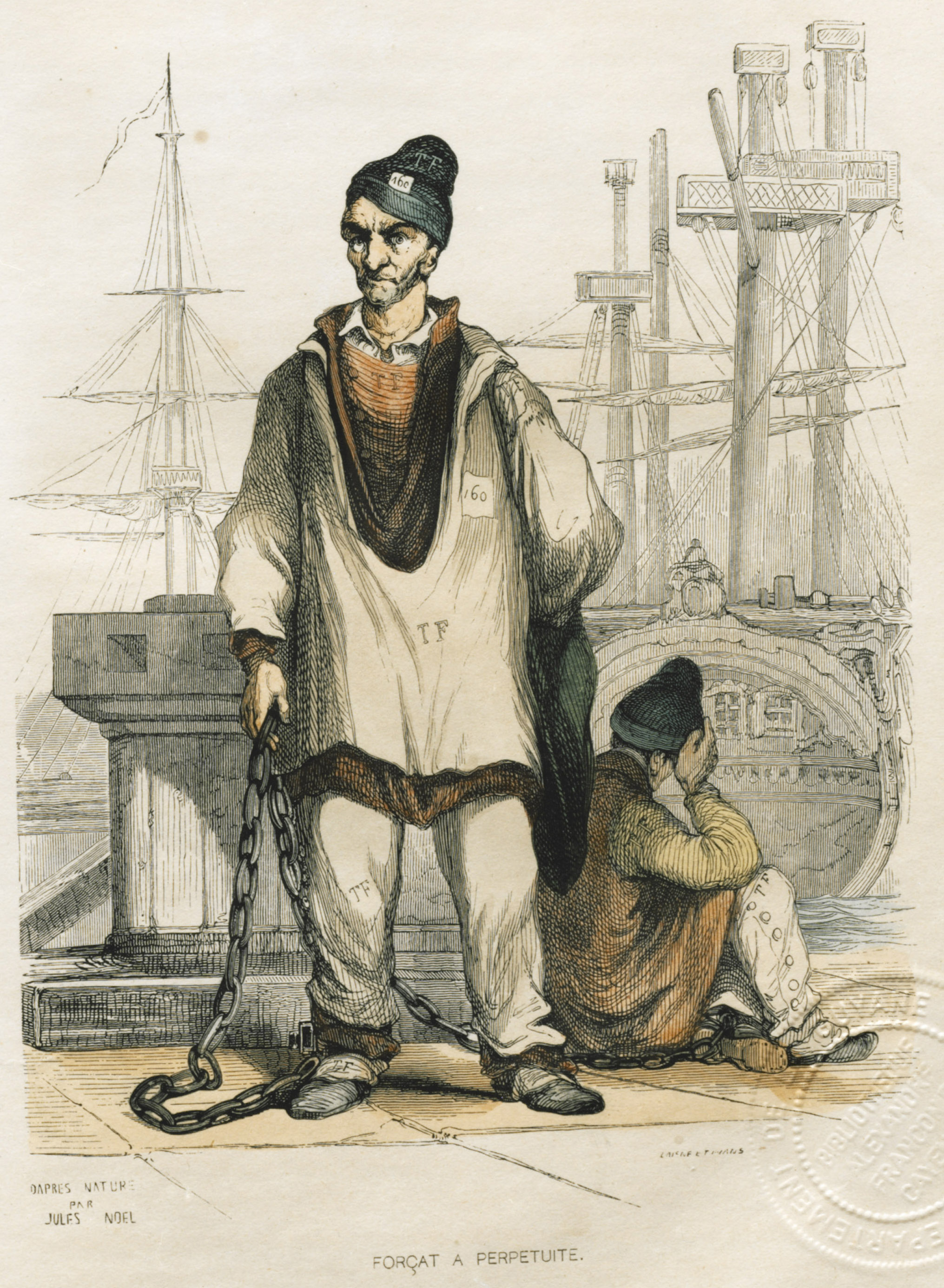
A Bagnard, or prisoner in the Bagne of Toulon, early 19th century. (Source: Museum of Fort Balaguier)

The Bagne of Toulon was a notorious bagne, or penal establishment in Toulon, France, made famous as the place of imprisonment of the fictional Jean Valjean, the hero of Victor Hugo's novel Les Misérables. It was opened in 1748 and closed in 1873.

== Origins: the galleys ==
The bagne was created by an ordinance of King Louis XV on September 27, 1748, to house the convicts who had previously been sentenced to row the galleys of the French Mediterranean fleet. The decree stated, in article 11, "All the galleys in the port will be disarmed, and the chiourmes (the ancient term for the convict galley rowers) will be kept on land in the bagnes, guarded halls, or other places which will be designated for their confinement." The name 'bagne' came from the Italian word bagno (giving bagnio in English), or "bath", the name of a prison in Rome which had formerly been a Roman bath. Other authors point to a prison in Livorno.

Since the 15th century, French prisoners had been sentenced to serve on the galleys, sometimes even for minor crimes. The galleys were long, narrow craft with cannon mounted on the bow and a high, ornamentally-decorated deck at the stern. Unlike sailing ships, they could operate when there was no wind. They were a force used only on the Mediterranean, where the sea was relatively calm, and were entirely independent of the Navy, with their own Grand Admiral. The galleys were used both for military missions and for ceremonial travel, for example carrying the Cardinal de Guise from France to Rome for the election of a new Pope after the death of Pope Paul IV in 1559. By the 18th century, changes in naval tactics and weapons had made the galleys obsolete, and the galleys were decommissioned, However, prisoners sentenced to forced labor continued to be sent to the south of France.

== The Bagne ==
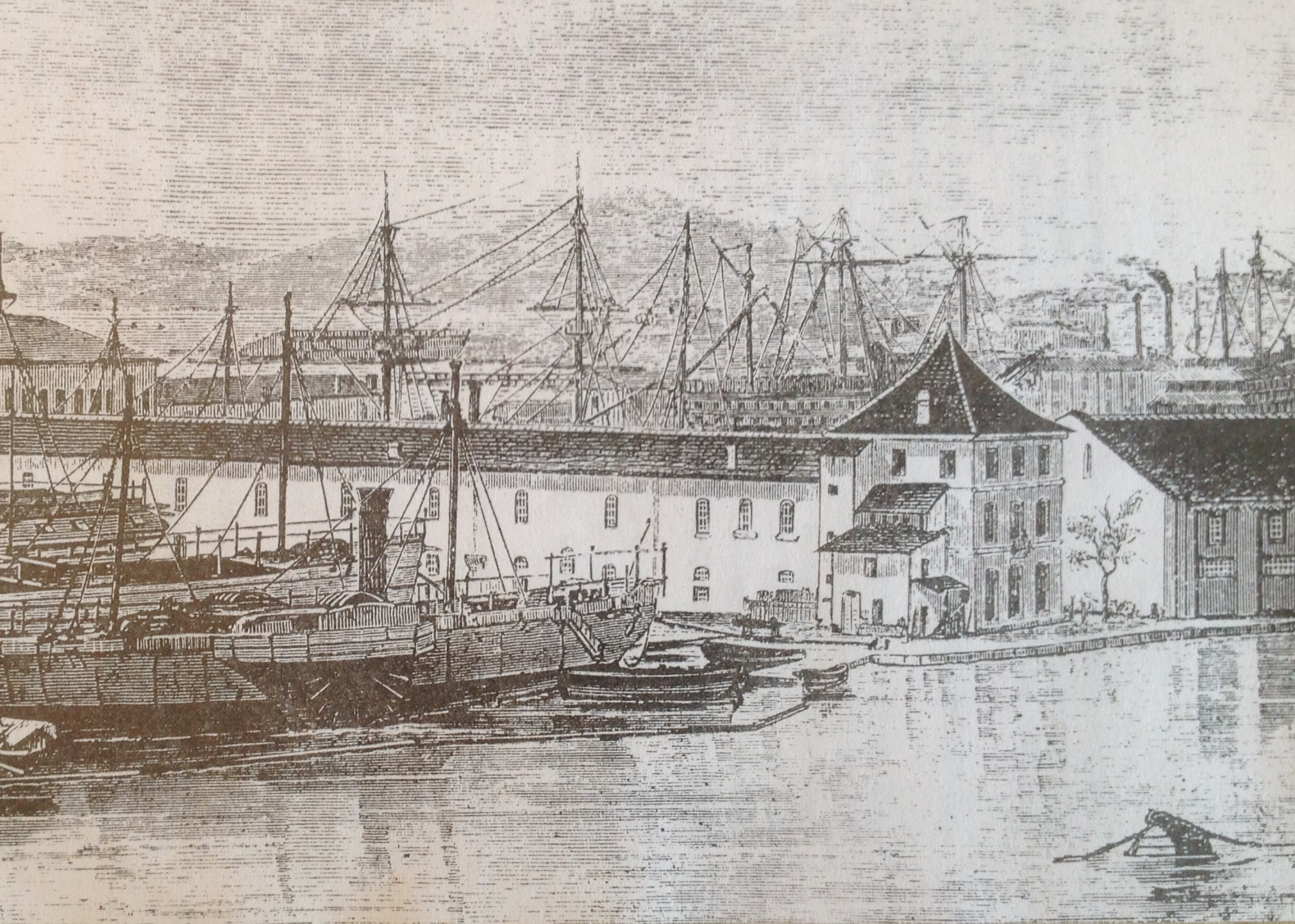
The Bagne of Toulon in the mid-19th century (from Histoire des Baignes depuis leurs creations jusqu'a nos jours by Pierre Zaccone, Paris (1869)

The galleys were originally based in Marseille. In 1749, with the new decree, the galley fleet was transferred to Toulon, to the port and arsenal of the French Mediterranean fleet. By the end of the 18th century there were about 3,000 prisoners in the Bagne. The convicts lived on the galleys, and then on larger prison ships, where the sanitary and health facilities were deplorable. Because of the poor health of the prisoners, in 1777 a hospital for the prisoners was installed in a casemate of the southeast rampart of the Darse Vauban, the immense naval port begun by Vauban during the reign of Louis XIV. The bagne was placed next to the first dry dock on the Mediterranean, built between 1774 and 1779. In 1797 a new building was constructed on the west quay of the Darse Vauban. It was two hundred meters long and two stories high, with towers with pyramid-shaped roofs at either end. The hospital occupied the first floor, a chapel for the prisoners was placed in the north end, and the rest of the building was occupied by the administration of the prison.

In the beginning, able-bodied prisoners lived in the casements of the ramparts or on prison ships. In 1814 they were transferred to a building on shore, 115 meters long, which was perpendicular to the hospital, located on the southwest quay, between the Darse Vauban and the entrance to the old port. Even after the construction of the new building, some prisoners continued to be held on ships when there was no place on land.

Docked next to the Bagne, at the entrance of the old port, was a decommissioned French ship, called L'Amiral. It had formerly been the frigate Muiron, which transported Napoleon Bonaparte from Egypt to France in 1799. It now had only a single mast. It fired a cannon every morning and evening, the signal to open and close the gates of the arsenal and to move the heavy chains which blocked the entrances to inner ports. If a prisoner escaped from the bagne, the Amiral fired a cannon, and hoisted a yellow flag, which remained until the prisoner was recaptured.

== Life of the prisoners ==
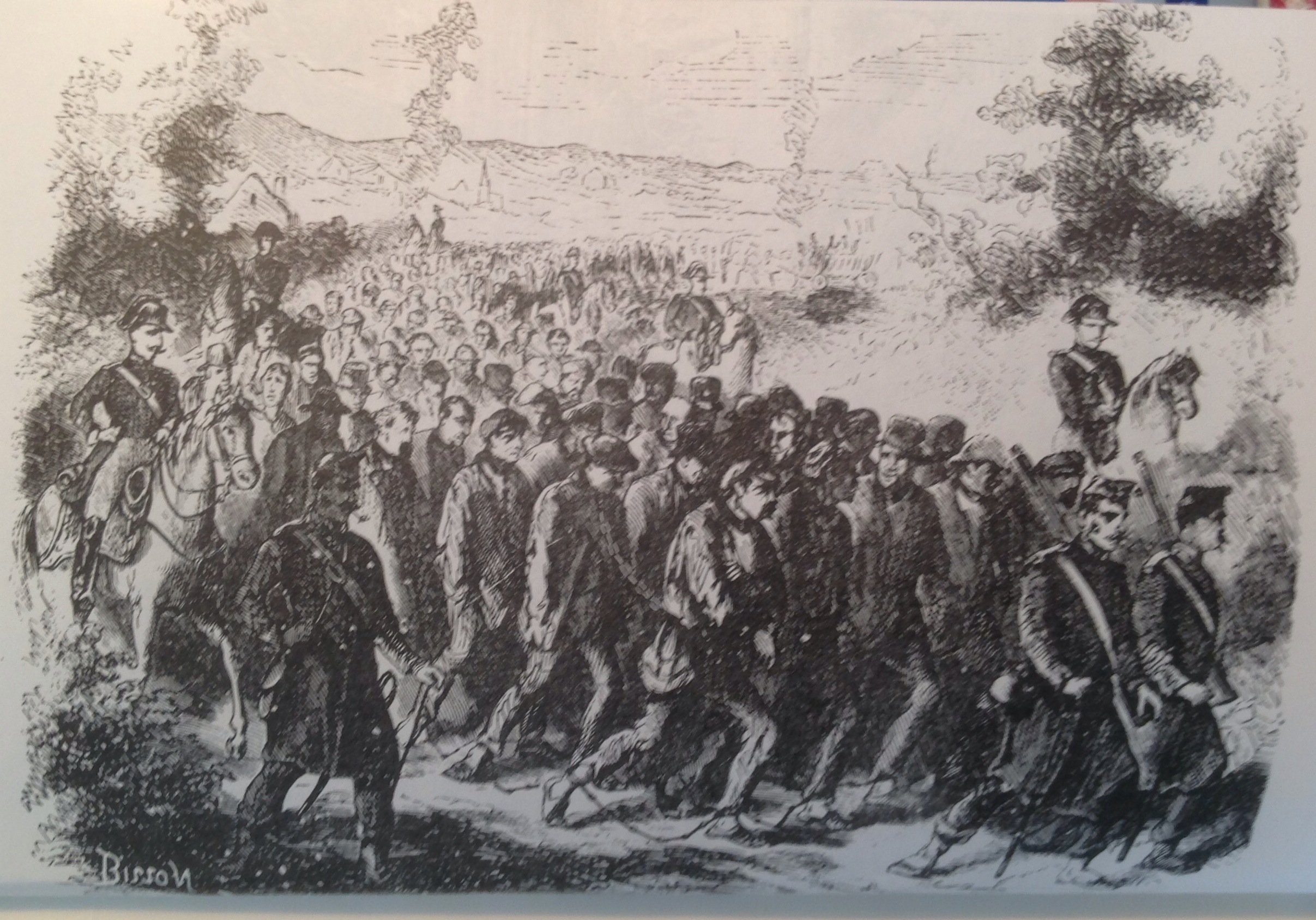
The Chaine; prisoners, chained at the neck, being marched from Paris to Toulon (from Histoire des Baignes depuis leurs creations jusqu'a nos jours by Pierre Zaccone, Paris (1869)

In 1836 the Bagne held 4,305 prisoners, of whom 1,193 were sentenced to life imprisonment; 173 to more than twenty years' imprisonment; 382 to terms between sixteen and twenty years; 387 to terms between eleven and fifteen years; 1469 to terms of between five and ten years; and 700 to terms of less than five years.

Beginning in 1820, prisoners sentenced to forced labor were marched, in chains, from the Bicêtre Prison in Paris to Lyon. The prisoners were attached by collars around their necks to a single long chain. They walked in a group, called la chaine (the chain), escorted by soldiers. In towns along the way between Paris and Lyon, additional prisoners were added to the chain. The prisoners wore their original civilian clothing, rather than prison dress. When the chain arrived in Lyon, the prisoners, still chained, were transferred to open boats which were towed by ship down the Rhone to Arles, and then continued by land to Toulon. The entire journey took thirty-five days. Later in the 19th century, the chain was abandoned and prisoners were transported in closed prison wagons.

When the prisoners arrived at Castigneau, a town on the harbor of Toulon, they were formally handed over to the Commissaire of the Bagne, an officer of the French Navy. There the iron collars around their necks were removed, their hair was cut and they were shaved, they were given a bath in large basins under a tent, and then they were conveyed by boat to the Bagne.

The predominant color of the prisoner's costumes was red, the traditional color of the uniforms worn by the crews on the galleys in the 16th and 17th centuries. The costumes of the prisoners consisted of a white shirt, yellow trousers, red vest and smock and a cap which had different colors depending on the sentence duration. In early years those sentenced to life imprisonment wore green caps, all the others red caps. During the French Revolution, because the revolutionaries wore the red Phrygian cap, the symbol of freedom, the French Convention forbade prisoners to wear red caps, and they went bare-headed. Under Napoleon, the red caps were reinstated for all prisoners. The trousers were buttoned the whole length of the leg, so they could be removed without taking off the iron ring and chain on their ankle. The prisoners were shaven and were given a peculiar haircut, with the sideburn on one side shaven and the other allowed to grow, so they could be identified more easily if they escaped.

An iron ring, called manille, was attached to one ankle. Attached to the manille was an iron chain with eighteen links. The ring and the chain together weighed seven kilograms and 250 grams. There were longer chains, of twenty-four links, for those with longer sentences, and for those sentenced to life imprisonment, an additional triangular ring so they could be chained to their bed. Before the French Revolution and again after 1810, the prisoners were also branded on the shoulder with a hot iron, using the letters TF (travaux forcés, hard labor) and TFP (travaux forcés à perpétuité, hard labor for life).

=== Food and drink ===
The daily food ration for prisoners was meager: 30 ounces (937 grams) of bread; 4 ounces (125 grams) of beans in a soup; and 48 centiliters of wine. However, nearly all the prisoners had employment which paid a small salary, and they were able to purchase additional food: a bouillon of vegetables for five centimes a liter, or meat at ten centimes a portion. The prisoners used the word 'gourgane' (the word for 'beans' in the Provençal language), and used the same word to refer to the guards.

=== Employment ===
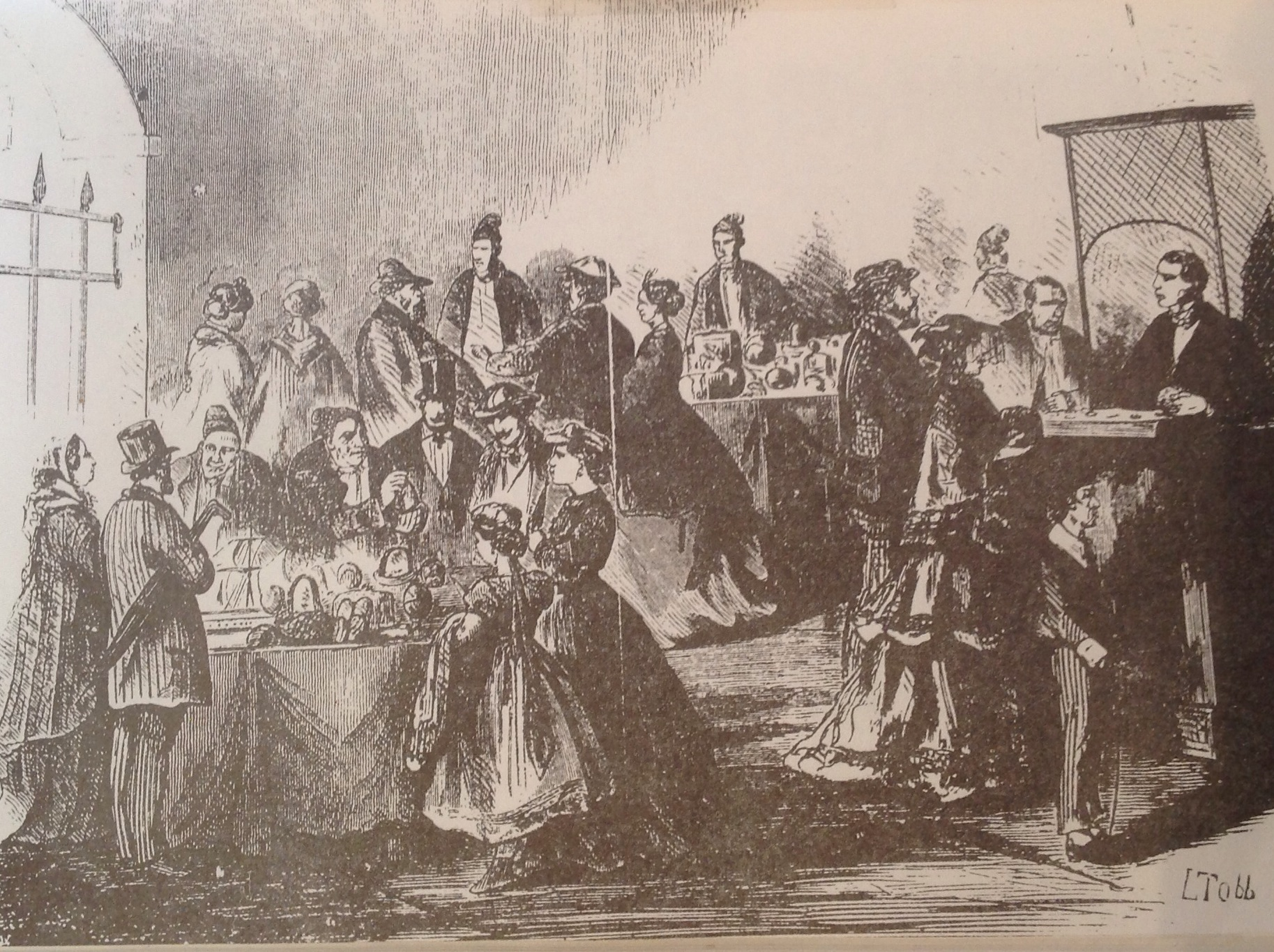
The Bazaar which sold handicrafts by prisoners. (from Histoire des Baignes depuis leurs creations jusqu'a nos jours by Pierre Zaccone, Paris (1869)

In the early years of the Bagne, only those prisoners with sentences of less than fifteen years were put to work in the arsenal; the others remained in chains in their dormitories. The resulting poor health of the long-term prisoners and epidemics in the Bagne led to a change in policy: all the prisoners were put to work, usually the heavy manual labor of the port, hauling cables, turning capstans, and carrying supplies. This duty was termed fatigue.

In 1821, the Commissaire of the Navy, Reynaud, observing that the prisoners who worked were better behaved, began a program to train and employ prisoners; they were trained as masons, carpenters, stonemasons, metal workers and other professions, and employed as secretaries, nurses, cooks, and other professions. A number of prisoners were trained to pull teeth, and their services were offered at a reasonable price to the people of Toulon. Several of them opened up their own practices in Toulon upon their release from the Bagne.

In later years the prisoners had the right, at certain times of day, to make handicrafts which they could sell to the Toulonais in the Bazaar, or gift-shop of the Bagne. The money they earned could be spent to buy additional food, or could be put into a fund they would receive on their release. A collection of objects made by prisoners is on display in the museum of Old Toulon near the Cour Lafayette.

=== Punishment ===
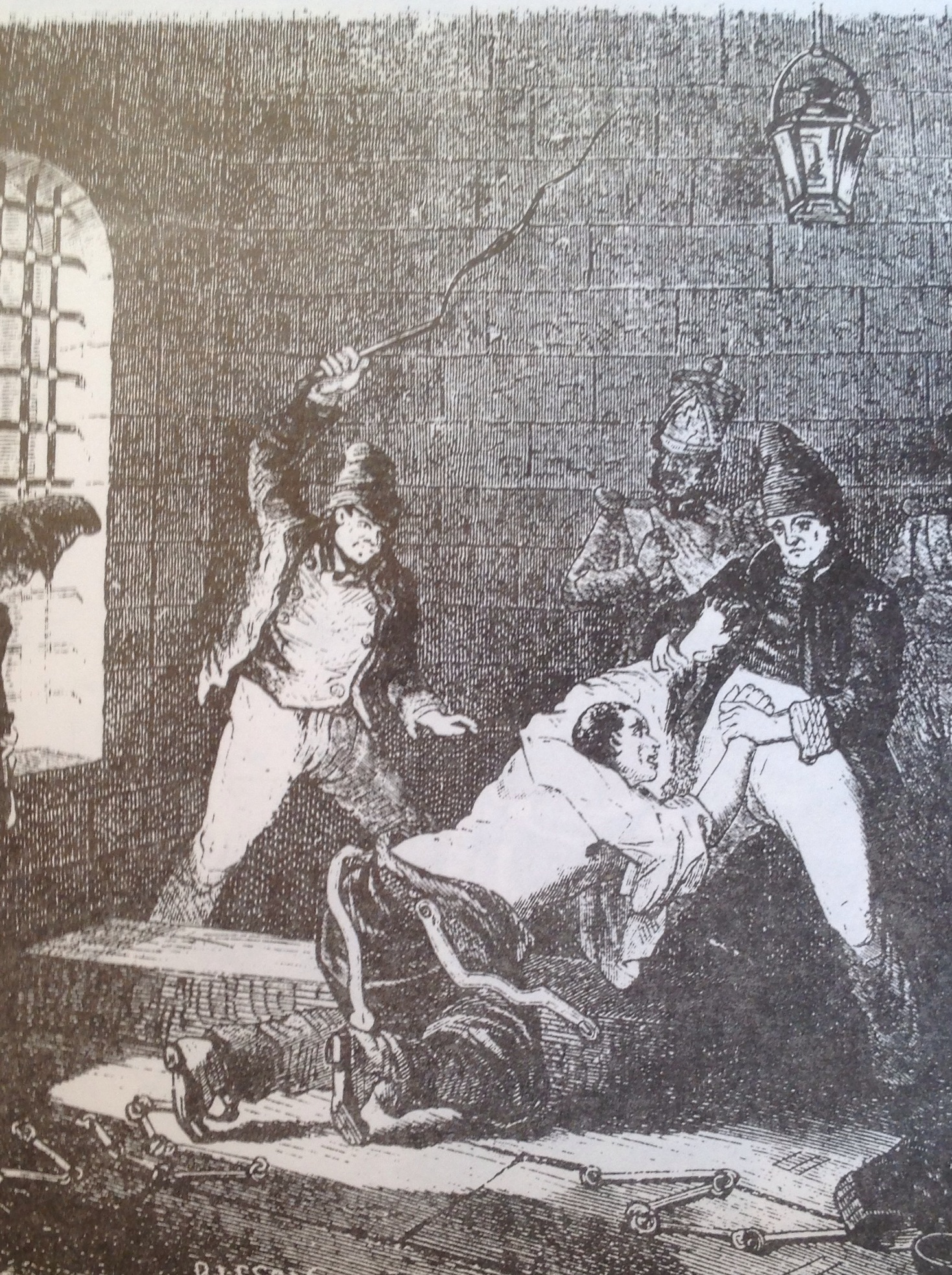
The bastonnade (from Histoire des Baignes depuis leurs creations jusqu'a nos jours by Pierre Zaccone, Paris (1869)

For minor offenses, prisoners were punished with the bastonnade, lashed on the back with a leather whip. Prisoners who had committed more serious crimes were chained together with another prisoner, and were chained to their beds at night. If a prisoner killed a guard or another prisoner, the penalty was death. For those and other most serious offenses, the Bagne had its own guillotine, and one of the prisoners served as the executioner. All of the bagnards were summoned to attend executions, on their knees and with their heads uncovered.

The prisoners had their own system of punishment for other prisoners who spied on them on behalf of the guards, or who encouraged prisoners to escape and then reported them to the guards to collect a reward. They were sometimes poisoned, stabbed, or were victims of deliberate "accidents" in the workplace.

== Administration ==
The commander of the Bagne was a Commissaire of the Navy, and had the official title Chef des Services des chiourmes, Chiourmes being the traditional term for the rowers in the galleys. The guards were titled grades-chourmes, and were mostly former active-duty soldiers who wanted easier duty. They wore dark blue uniforms with light blue trim, and a shako cap, and were armed with a saber, or, when outside the bagne, a loaded rifle. They were held in low repute in Toulon, and were known for the drinking and an inclination toward corruption. Prisoners were known to bribe guards for special favors.

== Escapes ==
There were many attempts to escape from the Bagne, few of which were successful. The most common means of attempting to escape was, during their working periods, to find a hiding place within the arsenal, conceal some food there, to hide there until night, and then to try to get away. Escaping was difficult; the workshops of the arsenal and the area around the bagne were patrolled by the guards, and soldiers watched the gates of the city and patrolled the surrounding countryside. Citizens who reported an escaped prisoner received a reward of fifty francs for those captured within the arsenal, or one hundred francs for those captured in the city or outside.

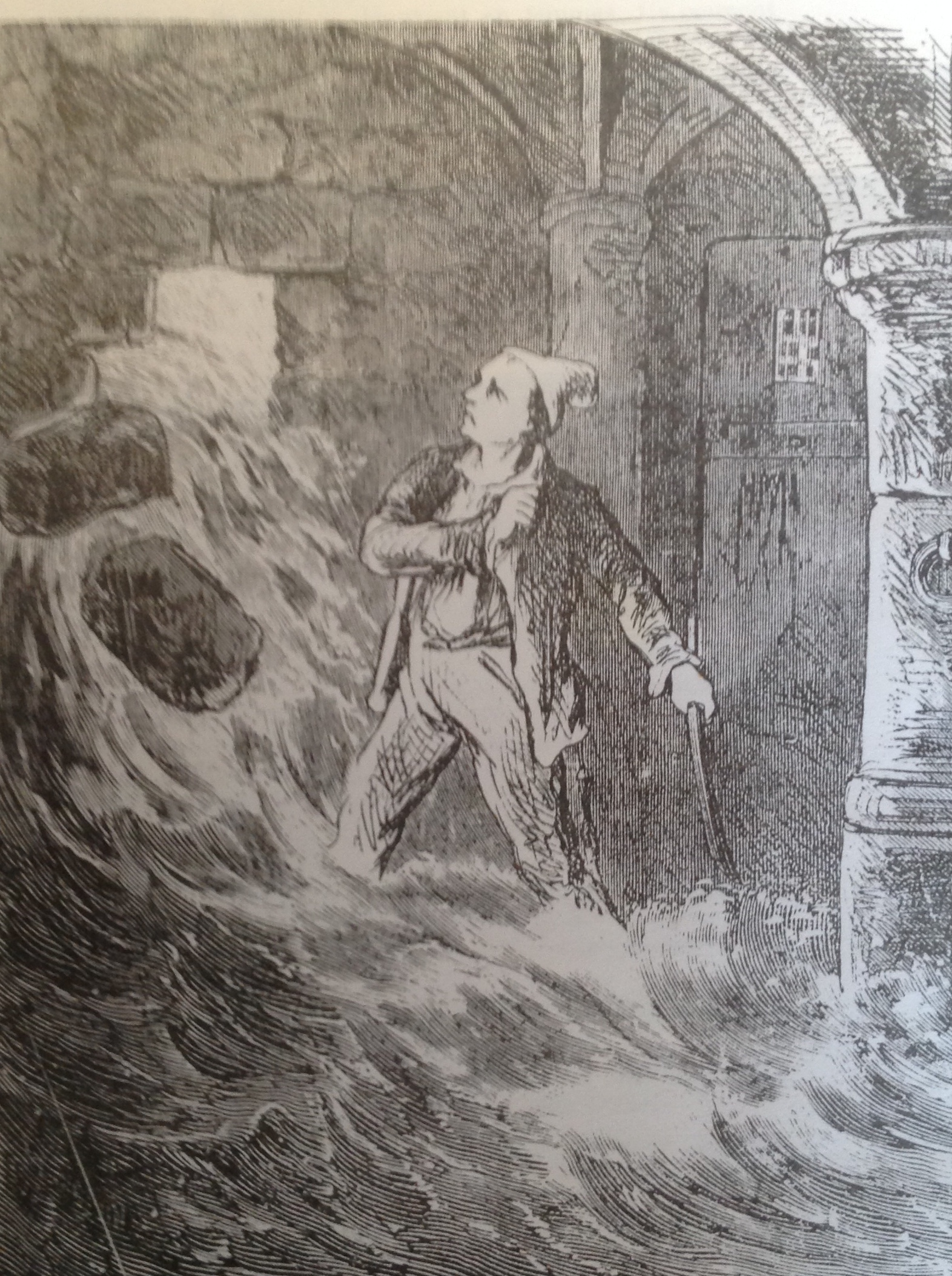
An unsuccessful escape attempt (from Histoire des Baignes depuis leurs creations jusqu'a nos jours by Pierre Zaccone, Paris (1869)

Nonetheless, they tried. One prisoner, named Gonnet, was celebrated for his badly planned escape attempts: he attempted to escape seven times, and was recaptured each time. Within the bagne, a poorly planned escape attempt became known as a gonnette. Another prisoner named Plassou hid within a small space in the wall, concealed behind stones and plaster. He waited until nightfall, broke through the plaster, climbed over the wall, but was seen by two fisherman sleeping next to the wall and was handed over to the guards. Many escapees were captured by Legueneux, an assistant-adjudant guard who watched the main gate of the arsenal. He knew the faces of all the prisoners, and could spot a bagnard immediately by his peculiar way of walking, caused by years of wearing a heavy chain.

One mass escape attempt was made on the night of June 21–22, 1824, during very stormy weather. Fifteen prisoners, led by one prisoner who was a stonemason, made a hole in the wall of their dormitory, put dummies in their beds, escaped through the neighboring gunpowder storeroom, and made their way to the quay. One was wounded by a gunshot, two drowned in the harbor from the weight of their chains, but the other twelve escaped into the city and the countryside. However, within eight days, the remaining twelve escapees were all recaptured.

A rare successful escape was made by a group of ten prisoners, who were rowing a boat of supplies across the harbor of Toulon. They disarmed and tied up the two guards and the captain of their boat, rowed past the customs posts, landed on the far side of the port, released their prisoners, and fled. A few were later recaptured, but the majority were never found.

== Involvement in conflict ==
During the 1793 siege of Toulon in the second year of the French Revolutionary Wars, the city was under the control of an alliance of Royalist, Federalist, British, Spanish, Neapolitan, Sicilian and Sardinian forces. When they were forced to evacuate Toulon as a result of successful attacks by the French Revolutionary Army, Royal Navy personnel under Sidney Smith set the city's New Arsenal on fire, and prisoners from the Bagne assisted pro-Republican sailors of the French Navy in putting out the fires. During the French Directory, wealthy prisoners were permitted to wear ordinary street clothing and to promenade freely outside the Bagne. Instead of an iron ring on their ankle, they were permitted to wear a slender silver ring, which was largely concealed by their trousers. During this time certain prisoners were allowed to work in the town as gardeners, domestic servants, musicians and teachers. After Napoleon took power in 1799, the more rigorous regime was restored.

After France began to colonize North Africa, the Bagne included a contingent of Muslim prisoners; they were allowed to have a distinctive haircut, different from the other prisoners, though they had to shave their beards. The bagne also occasionally held military prisoners, including five hundred Prussian soldiers captured by Napoleon, released in 1814, and occasional political prisoners, including those who had participated in various conspiracies against the governments of the Restoration and Louis-Philippe, and the Paris Commune and the Marseille Commune of 1871.

== Celebrated prisoners ==
A few of the bagnards, or prisoners, were well-known, notably a famous imposter named Coignard, who pretended to be the Count of St. Helena, and Eugène François Vidocq (23 July 1775 – 11 May 1857) a French criminal who later became the first director of Sûreté Nationale and one of the first modern private investigators. He was sentenced to the Bagne in Toulon, arriving on 29 August 1799. After a failed escape attempt, he escaped again on 6 March 1800 with the help of a prostitute. He is sometimes cited as the model for both Javert and Jean Valjean in Les Misérables.

== Abolition ==
At the beginning of the Second Empire of Napoleon III the government decided to close the prisons at the naval ports, which were considered undesirable and expensive to run. It was therefore decided to replace the so-called "bagnes métropolitains", the prisons within cities, with transportation to French Guiana (with the central administration in Saint-Laurent-du-Maroni and Devil's Island mainly used for political prisoners) and later also to Nouméa in French New Caledonia. The bagnes of Rochefort and Brest were closed in 1852 and 1858 respectively, but Toulon, the largest, took longer to empty. It was finally closed, and the buildings were used by the Navy as offices and depots. The buildings survived until 1944, when the bagne was almost entirely destroyed by an Allied bombing raid. All that remains today is a fragment of wall on the southeast side of the Darse Vauban.

== In literature ==
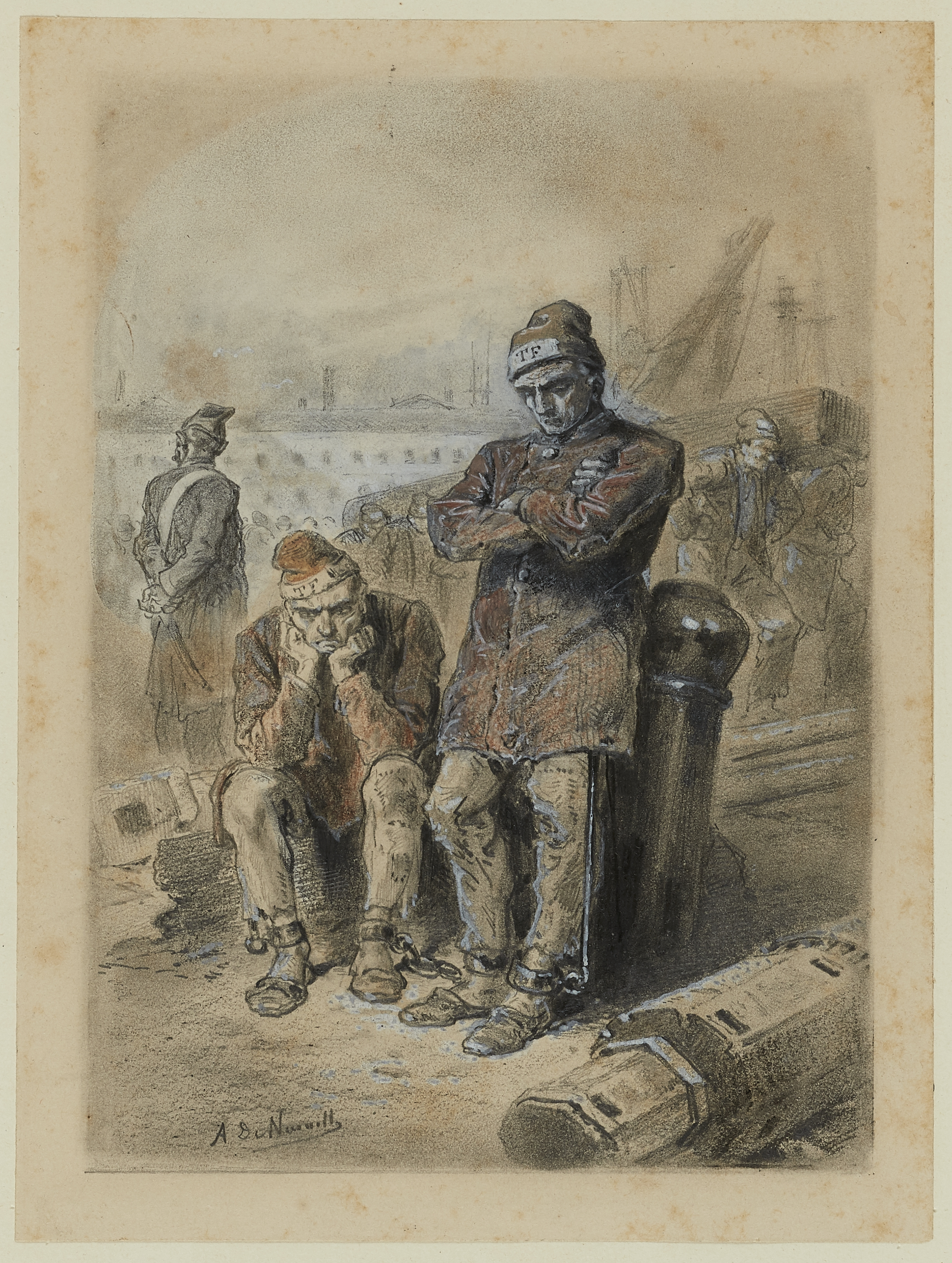
Valjean (right) in the Bagne; the letters TF on his hat refer to travaux forcés ("hard labour").

Almost all of the important writers of the romantic period, including Victor Hugo, Honoré de Balzac, Alexandre Dumas, George Sand, Prosper Mérimée and Gustave Flaubert stopped by Toulon to see the bagne for themselves. Stendhal came in 1838 to visit the arsenal, but refused to make the traditional visit to the bagne, citing his "horror" of meeting the inmate; "the ugliness at all points had already depressed me enough."

- The Memoirs of Francois Vidocq, published in 1828, described his experiences as a prisoner in both the bagnes of Brest and Toulon. After his criminal career, he became famous as the first chief of the Sureté, the elite branch of the French police. With various modifications, Vidocq returned as a fictional character, and is often cited as the model for Jean Valjean in Les Misérables. (1862).
- Another character inspired by Vidocq, Vautrin, appears in three of Honoré de Balzac's novels within Le Comédie Humaine (1834–35); Le Père Goriot, Splendeurs et Misères des courtesans (1838–47), and Illusions Perdues.
- The Mysteries of Paris (1842–43) by Eugène Sue features a former bagnard character called The Chourineur (the stabber) and an escaped bagnard called The Schoolmaster.
- Gaspard Caderousse and Benedetto, also known as Andrea Cavalcanti, are bagnards who appear in Le Comte de Monte-Cristo (1844), by Alexandre Dumas, père. A story by Dumas, Gabriel Lambert, also featuring a bagnard, was adapted for the stage under the name Le Bagnard de l'opéra.
- Pierre Alexis Ponson du Terrail's Rocambole is imprisoned in the Bagne in his third novel, Les Exploits de Rocambole (1858–1859).
- Jean Valjean in Victor Hugo's Les Misérables (1862) was the most famous bagnard in French literature. At the beginning of the novel, he had just been released from the bagne, and later he is sent back and then escapes, after rescuing a sailor, by diving from a ship's mast into the harbor. Hugo traveled to Toulon in 1839 and visited the bagne, making extensive notes, and expressing his strong dislike of the whole institution. On one page of his notes he wrote, in large block letters, a possible name for a hero of his story: JEAN TRÉJEAN. He did not begin writing the novel until 1845, when Jean Tréjean became Jean Valjean.
- An early story by the young Jules Verne, La Destinée de Jean Morénas, has a prisoner en route to Toulon as its main character.
- In the C.S. Forester novel Flying Colours (novel), the main character, Captain Horatio Hornblower of the British Royal Navy, disguised as a Dutch customs officer in French service commandeers a chain gang of French prisoners to help man the cutter Hornblower uses to escape France.

== Bibliography ==
- Académie du Var (2010). Le Bagne de Toulon (1748-1873) (in French). Autres Temps Editions. ISBN 978-2-84521-394-4.
- Roumagnac, Cyrille (2001). L'Arsenal de Toulon et la Royale (in French). Alan Sutton. ISBN 978-2-84253-602-2.
- Raoulx, Docteur (1929). Le Bagne de Toulon (in French). Editions Les Kiosques.
- Vergé-Franceschi, Michel (2002). Toulon - Port Royal (1481-1789) (in French). Paris: Tallandier. ISBN 978-2-84734-001-3.

== External sources ==
- Article about the Bagne on Net Marine, French Association for Internet Diffusion of information about the French Navy (in French).
