= Rocambole (French TV series) =

Television series

- Created by: Jean-Pierre Decourt
- Based on: Rocambole by Pierre Alexis Ponson du Terrail
- Starring: Pierre Vernier; Jean Topart
- Country of origin: France
- Original language: French
- No. of seasons: 3
- No. of episodes: 78

Production
- Running time: 13 minutes

Original release
- Network: RTF
- Release: 18 April 1964 – May 10, 1965

Rocambole is a French drama created by Jean-Pierre Decourt based on the novel of the same name by Pierre Alexis Ponson du Terrail.

== Cast ==
- Pierre Vernier : Rocambole
- Jean Topart : Andréa de Felipone / Sir Williams / George Stowe
- René Clermont : Monsieur de Beaupréau
- Marianne Girard : Louise Crochet / Baccarat / Aspasie d'Avranches
- Jeanne Herviale : « Maman » Fippart
- Raoul Curet : Colart puis le Pâtissier
- Jean Heynau : Mourax
- Maurice Chevaly : Nicolo
- Michel Puterflam : Mort des braves
- Alain Dekok : Marmouset
