= Lucien Nat =

French actor (1895–1972)

- Born: Lucien Maurice Natte; 11 January 1895; Paris, France
- Died: 25 July 1972 (aged 77); Clichy-la-Garenne, France
- Occupation: Actor
- Years active: 1931–1972 (film & TV)

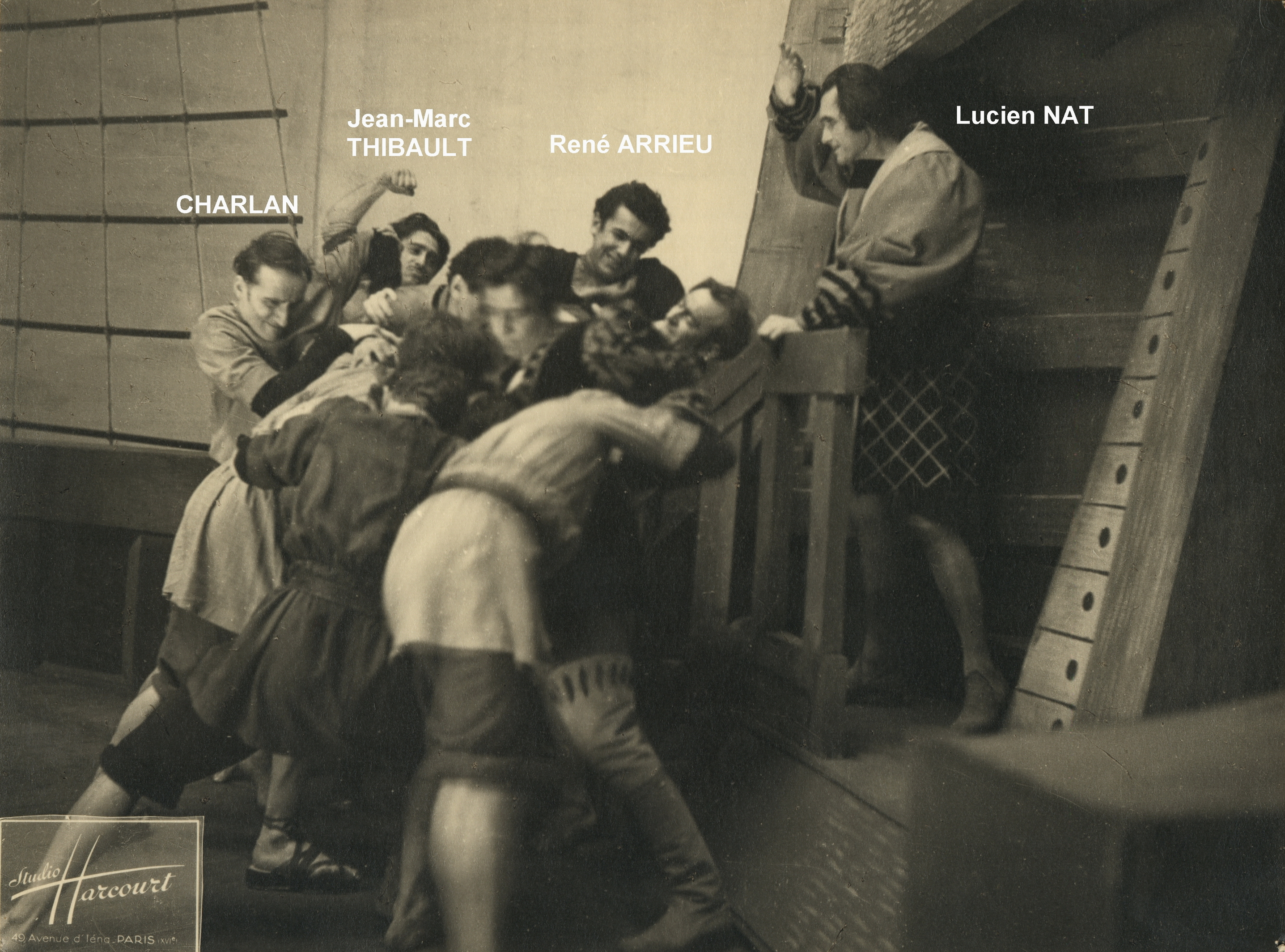
1943-05 Théâtre Montparnasse – Scene from Cristobal with Charlan, Jean-Marc Thibault, René Arrieu and Lucien Nat

Lucien Nat (born Lucien Maurice Natte; 11 January 1895 – 25 July 1972) was a French film, stage and television actor. He was married to the actress Marie Déa.

== Selected filmography ==
- Fun in the Barracks (1932) - Maréchal des Logis chef Barnot
- Les Misérables (1934) - Montparnasse
- The Tender Enemy (1936) - Le Promis
- Boissière (1937) - Jean Le Barois
- The Cheat (1937) - Maître Ribeyre
- Rasputin (1938) - Ostrowski
- Le corsaire (1939)
- Camp Thirteen (1940) - Carlos
- The Last of the Six (1941) - Marcel Gernicot
- Business Is Business (1942) - Lucien Garraud
- Colonel Pontcarral (1942) - Garron
- The Heart of a Nation (1943) - Bernard Froment adulte
- Des jeunes filles dans la nuit (1943) - Le père d'Andrée
- Captain Fracasse (1943) - Agostin / Agostino
- Mermoz (1943) - Julien Pranville
- Le Bossu (1944) - Jean de Peyrolles
- Lunegarde (1946) - Monsieur de Lunegarde
- Patrie (1946) - La duc d'Albe
- Martin Roumagnac (1946) - Rimbaut - l'adjoint au maire, ancien amant de Blanche
- The Unknown Singer (1947) - Carray Mas
- The Revenge of Baccarat (1947) - Andrea
- Rocambole (1947) - Andrea
- Nine Boys, One Heart (1948) - Le monsieur
- Fort de la solitude (1948) - Le capitaine
- The Mystery of the Yellow Room (1949) - Robert Darzac
- Return to Life (1949) - Charles (segment 1 : "Le retour de tante Emma")
- The Perfume of the Lady in Black (1949) - Robert Darzac
- The Paris Waltz (1950) - Napoléon III (uncredited)
- Cartouche, King of Paris (1950) - M. de Cellamare
- The Convict (1951) - Messner
- We Are All Murderers (1952) - L'avocat général
- Imperial Violets (1952) - (uncredited)
- The Last Robin Hood (1953) - Antoine Lévêque
- Little Jacques (1953) - Le procureur
- Royal Affairs in Versailles (1954) - Montesquieu (uncredited)
- Le pain vivant (1955) - M. Valmont
- Black Dossier (1955) - Dr. Dessouche - le médecin légiste
- If Paris Were Told to Us (1956) - Montesquieu
- Reproduction interdite (1957) - Martinaud
- Police judiciaire (1958) - L'inspecteur Lanoux
- The Goose of Sedan (1959) - Captain
- Famous Love Affairs (1961) - Le préfet (segment "Comédiennes, Les") (uncredited)
- Le petit garçon de l'ascenseur (1962) - Le président
- Climats (1962) - M. Marcenat
- Thérèse Desqueyroux (1962) - Laroque
- Les amitiés particulières (1964) - Le père supérieur / Father Superior
- Passeport diplomatique agent K 8 (1965) - Professeur Wilkowski

== Bibliography ==
- McCann, Ben. Julien Duvivier. Oxford University Press, 2017.
