= Marcel Delaître =

French actor (1888–1963)

- Born: 25 January 1888; Paris, France
- Died: 21 April 1963 (aged 75); Paris, France
- Occupation: Actor
- Years active: 1920–1960 (film)

Marcel Delaître (1888–1963) was a French film and stage actor.

== Selected filmography ==
- Happy Hearts (1932)
- Lilac (1932)
- Poliche (1934)
- Street Without a Name (1934)
- Crime and Punishment (1935)
- Girls of Paris (1936)
- The Gardens of Murcia (1936)
- Return at Dawn (1938)
- Women's Prison (1938)
- The Puritan (1938)
- J'accuse! (1938)
- Immediate Call (1939)
- Paradise Lost (1940)
- Strange Suzy (1941)
- Colonel Pontcarral (1942)
- Le Corbeau (1943)
- First on the Rope (1944)
- Father Goriot (1945)
- The Eleventh Hour Guest (1945)
- Night Warning (1946)
- The Queen's Necklace (1946)
- Special Mission (1946)
- Raboliot (1946)
- The Lost Village (1947)
- Something to Sing About (1947)
- The Secret of Monte Cristo (1948)
- Rocambole (1948)
- The Revenge of Baccarat (1948)
- Du Guesclin (1949)
- The King (1949)
- God Needs Men (1950)
- The Little Zouave (1950)
- Amédée (1950)
- Women Are Crazy (1950)
- The Billionaire Tramp (1951)
- Maria of the End of the World (1951)
- Mammy (1951)
- The Case Against X (1952)
- Alone in the World (1952)
- When You Read This Letter (1953)

== Bibliography ==
- Crisp, Colin. French Cinema—A Critical Filmography: Volume 2, 1940–1958. Indiana University Press, 2015.
