= Rocambole (1948 film) =

- Directed by: Jacques de Baroncelli
- Written by: André-Paul Antoine; Pierre Alexis Ponson du Terrail (novel); Léon Roth
- Produced by: André Paulvé
- Starring: Pierre Brasseur; Sophie Desmarets; Lucien Nat
- Cinematography: Léonce-Henri Burel; Giuseppe Caracciolo
- Edited by: Claude Ibéria
- Music by: Renzo Rossellini
- Production companies: Films André Paulvé; Scalera Film
- Distributed by: DisCina; Scalera Film
- Release date: 18 February 1948
- Running time: 105 minutes
- Countries: France; Italy
- Language: French

Rocambole is a 1948 French-Italian historical thriller film directed by Jacques de Baroncelli and starring Pierre Brasseur, Sophie Desmarets and Lucien Nat. It portrays the adventures of the popular character Rocambole. It was followed by a sequel The Revenge of Baccarat.

It was shot at the Scalera Studios in Rome. The film's sets were designed by the art directors René Moulaert and Ottavio Scotti.

== Cast ==
- Pierre Brasseur as Joseph Flippart dit 'Rocambole'
- Sophie Desmarets as La comtesse Artoff dite 'Baccarat'
- Lucien Nat as Andrea
- Robert Arnoux as Ventura
- Loredana as Carmen de Montevecchio
- Roland Armontel as Le comte Artoff
- Marcel Delaître as Doctor Blanche
- Carla Candiani as Fanny
- Vittorio Sanipoli as Arnaud, comte de Chamery
- Ernesto Sabbatini as Marquis de Montevecchio
- Attilio Dottesio
- Luisa Rossi
- Ginette Roy as Cerise
- Marcello Giorda
- Gualtiero Isnenghi
- Silvia Manto
- Nino Marchesini
- Evelina Paoli
- Mario Sailer as Le secrétaire / il segretario
- Massimo Serato
- Cristina Veronesi

== Bibliography ==
- Dayna Oscherwitz & MaryEllen Higgins. The A to Z of French Cinema. Scarecrow Press, 2009.
