= Rocambole (character) =

- Rocambole character
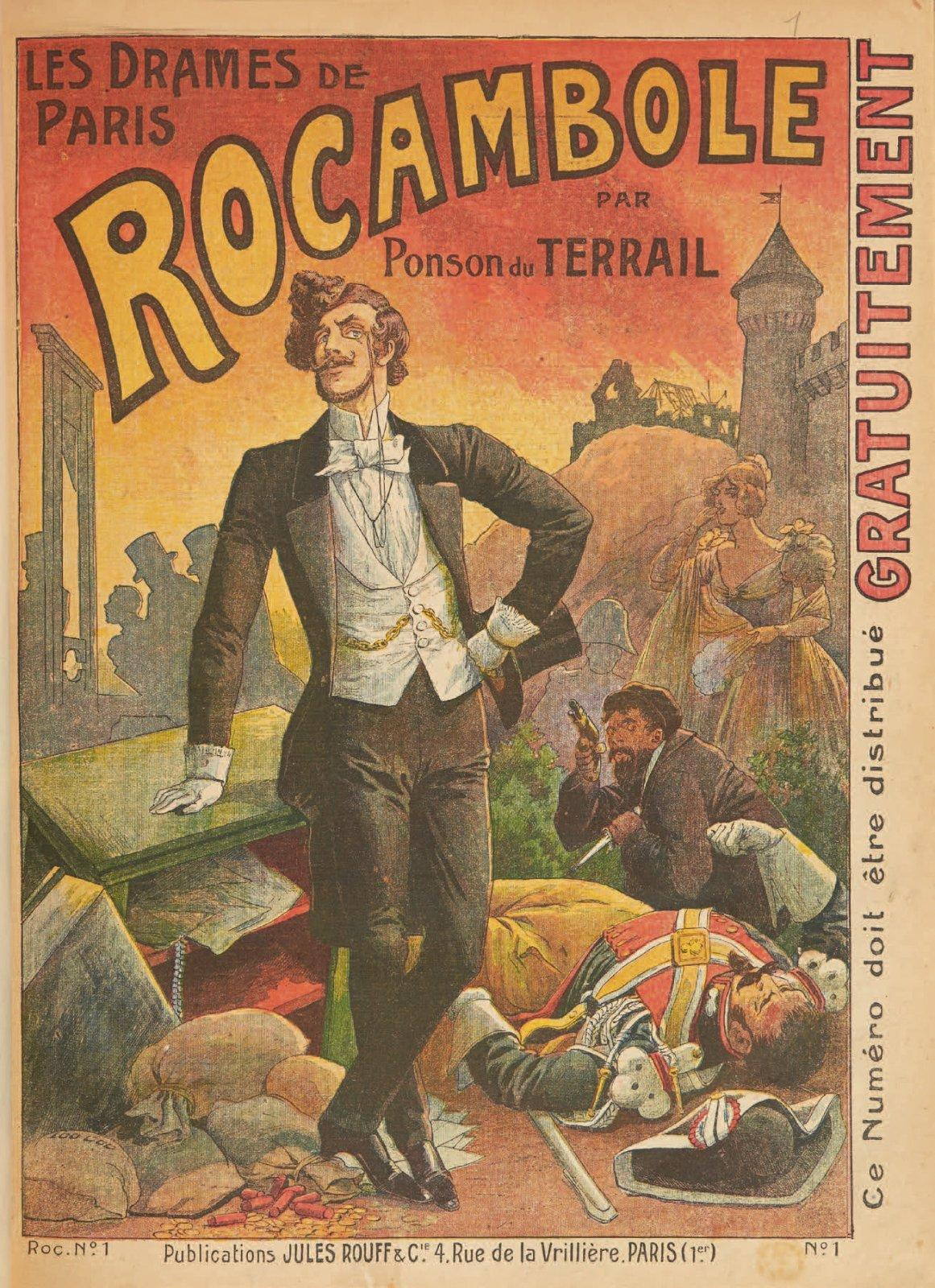
- Cover of a reissue of a cycle of Rocambole novels published by Jules Rouff in 1908-1910
- First appearance: L'Héritage Mystérieux (1857)
- Created by: Pierre Alexis Ponson du Terrail
- Portrayed by: Pierre Vernier

In-universe information
- Full name: Joseph Fipart
- Aliases: Vicomte de Cambolh; Marquis Albert de Chamery; Major Avatar
- Gender: Male
- Occupation: Criminal; Detective
- Family: Maman Fipart (adoptive mother)
- Nationality: French

Rocambole (French pronunciation: [ʁɔkɑ̃bɔl]) is a fictional adventurer created by Pierre Alexis Ponson du Terrail, a 19th-century French writer. The word rocambolesque has become common in French and other languages to label any kind of fantastic adventure.

== Overview ==
The series introduces Rocambole as a highly resourceful adolescent, an orphan adopted by the wily crone Maman Fipart. He first assists the evil Andrea de Felipone, a.k.a. Sir Williams, in his fight against Andrea's half-brother, the Comte de Kergaz. A major protagonist in the battle is a courtesan with a heart of gold and a fearless temper, Louise Charmet, a.k.a. Baccarat.

In the third novel of the series Rocambole takes over and kills Sir Williams. But Baccarat again thwarts his evil schemes and he ends up imprisoned in the hard labor camp of Toulon (as does Jean Valjean in Victor Hugo's 1862 novel Les Misérables.)

In the fourth novel an older and wiser Rocambole, who has been pardoned, has become a do-gooder; however the feuilleton (installment) was not popular with the readers, and Ponson du Terrail rewrote a new version in which Rocambole escapes from Toulon, redeems himself and becomes a fully fledged hero.

The later novels portray Rocambole as a fearless hero fighting a variety of dastardly villains such as the Thuggee. He has become a veritable mastermind, who has been to India and has gathered around him a coterie of equally talented assistants.

Rocambole anticipates characters such as A. J. Raffles, Arsène Lupin, Fantômas, The Saint, Doc Savage, Judex and The Shadow.

In a final chapter to the sixth volume Ponson du Terrail claims that Rocambole really existed and was narrating his own exploits through him, making Rocambole perhaps the first metafictional hero of his kind.

== Books ==
1. Les Drames de Paris (1857) (aka L'Héritage Mystérieux)
2. Le Club des Valets de Coeur (1858)
3. Les Exploits de Rocambole (1858–59)
4. Les Chevaliers du Clair de Lune (1860–62)
5. La Résurrection de Rocambole (1865–66) (this novel rewrites and supersedes 4 above)
6. Le Dernier Mot de Rocambole (1866–67)
7. Les Misères de Londres (1867–68)
8. Les Démolitions de Paris (1869)
9. La Corde du Pendu (1870, never completed)

=== By other writers ===
Napoleon III of France depicted by André Gill as Rocambole, 1867

- by Contant Gueroult:
  1. Le Retour et la Fin de Rocambole (1875)
  2. Les Nouveaux Exploits de Rocambole (1880)
- by Jules Cardoze:
  1. Les Bâtards de Rocambole (1886)
- by Leite Bastos:
  1. As Maravilhas do Homem Pardo (188?) (Portuguese-language sequel to La Corde du Pendu.)
- by Frédéric Valade:
  1. Le Petit-Fils de Rocambole (1922)
  2. La Haine immortelle (1922)
  3. Le Testament de Rocambole (1931)
  4. Olivia contre Rocambole (1931)
  5. La Justice de Rocambole (1932)
  6. La Belle Olivia (1932)
  7. Les Larmes de Rocambole (1933)
  8. Le Châtiment d'Olivia (1933)
- by Michel Honaker:
  1. Rocambole et le Spectre de Kerloven (2002) (This series of novels crosses over Rocambole and Paul Féval's Les Habits Noirs).
  2. Rocambole et les Marionnettes de la Mort (2003) [Rocambole and the Puppets of Death]
  3. Rocambole et le Pacte de Sang (2004) [Rocambole and the Pact of Blood]
  4. Rocambole et le Diable de Montrouge (2005) [Rocambole and the Devil of Montrouge] (2005)
  5. Rocambole et la Sorcière du Marais (2005) [Rocambole and the Witch of the Marais] (2005)

== Films ==
- Rocambole (Fr.; serial, B&W., 1914)
- Rocambole (Fr.; serial, B&W., 1924)
- Rocambole (Fr.; B&W., 1932)
- Rocambole (Mexico; B&W., 69 min., 1946)
- Rocambole (Fr.; B&W., 105 min., 1948)
- The Revenge of Baccarat (Fr.; B&W., 105 min., 1948)
- Rocambole (Fr.; col., 100 min., 1963)

== Television ==
Rocambole (French ORTF, B&W, three series of twenty-six 15-min. episodes, 1964–65)

== Comics ==
Hungarian comics artist György Szitas adapted Rocamble into a comic strip.

== Cultural influence ==
The name of the Russian crime group Club of Jacks of Hearts is borrowed from the novel Le Club des Valets de Coeur.

The character Rocambole is also related to the Greek Rocambole Gang, which was active between 1926 and 1929. The gang derived its name and public identity from Rocambole, whose adventure novels were widely circulated in Greece in the early 20th century. The gang’s leader, Andreas Christofileas, adopted the nickname Rocambole and reportedly drew inspiration from the character’s traits of ingenuity, disguise and defiance of authority. Contemporary press coverage and later historical accounts have noted this literary influence when interpreting the gang’s self-presentation and actions, viewing it as an example of the impact of popular serialized fiction on urban youth culture during the interwar period. The association between the fictional character and the gang contributed to public debates at the time concerning the influence of mass literature on criminal behavior and identity formation.
