= Pierre Alexis Ponson du Terrail =

French writer (1829–1871)

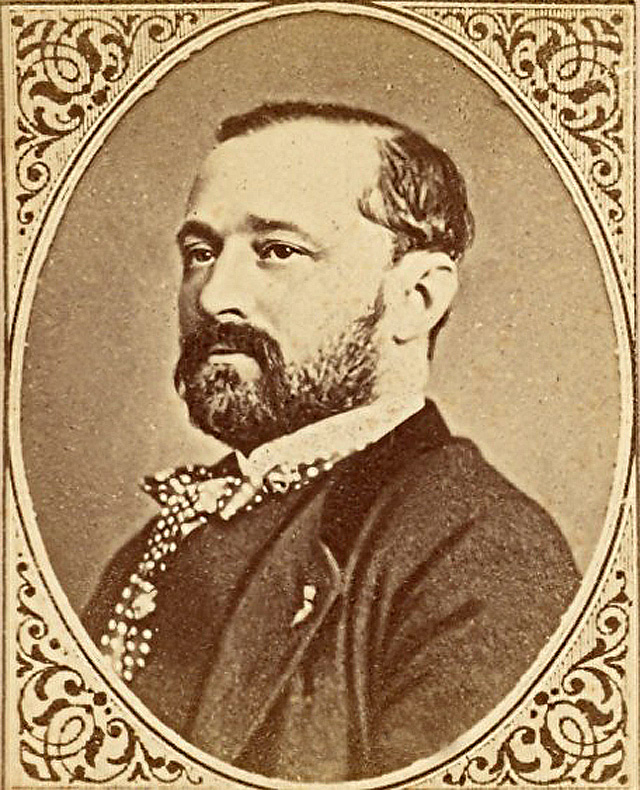
- Pierre Alexis Ponson du Terrail
- Born: Pierre Alexis Ponson du Terrail; 8 July 1829; Montmaur (Hautes Alpes), France
- Died: 20 January 1871 (aged 42); Bordeaux, France
- Occupations: Novelist; poet; playwright
- Writing career
- Notable work: Rocambole

Pierre Alexis, Viscount of Ponson du Terrail (8 July 1829 – 20 January 1871) was a French writer. He was a prolific novelist, producing in the space of twenty years some seventy-three volumes, and is best remembered today for his creation of the fictional character of Rocambole.

== Biography ==
He was born in Montmaur (Hautes Alpes).

Ponson du Terrail's early works squarely belonged to the Gothic novel genre: his La Baronne Trépassée (1852) was a murky Ann Radcliffe-like tale of revenge in the macabre surroundings of 18th-century Germany Black Forest. The novel was translated by Brian Stableford as The Vampire and the Devil's Son in 2007. ISBN 978-1-932983-55-5

La Femme Immortelle (1869) was another of Ponson's classic flirtations with the supernatural and the theme of vampires. The novel was also translated by Brian Stableford as The Immortal Woman in 2013. ISBN 978-1-61227-175-0

When Ponson du Terrail embarked in 1857 on writing the first novel of the Rocambole series, L'Héritage Mystérieux (also known as Les Drames de Paris), for the daily newspaper La Patrie, he merely meant to copy the success of Eugène Sue's best-selling Les Mystères de Paris. Rocambole's importance to mystery fiction and adventure novels cannot be overestimated, as it represents the transition from the old-fashioned Gothic novel to modern heroic fiction. The word rocambolesque has become common in French to label any kind of fantastic adventures, especially those with multiple new turns in the story.

Rocambole became a huge success, providing a constant and considerable source of revenue to Ponson du Terrail, who continued churning out his adventures. In total, he produced nine Rocambole novels. His other notable novels include Les Coulisses du monde (1853) and Le Forgeron de la Cour-Dieu (1869).

In August 1870, as Ponson du Terrail had embarked on a new Rocambole saga, Emperor Napoleon III surrendered to Germany. Ponson fled from Paris to his country estate near Orléans, where he gathered a group of like-minded companions and began a guerilla-style warfare, not unlike what Rocambole himself would have done. However, Ponson was soon forced to flee to Bordeaux after the Germans burned down his castle.

He died in Bordeaux in 1871, leaving the saga of Rocambole uncompleted and was buried in the Cimetière de Montmartre in the Montmartre Quarter of Paris.

== Quotes ==
Ponson du Terrail wrote in a hurry and rarely checked what he had written, rushing to meet deadlines. He is well known for some eccentric sentences :

- "Her hands were as cold as those of a snake" (fr :Elle avait les mains aussi froides que celles d'un serpent)
- "With one hand, he raised the dagger, and with the other he said.." (D'une main il leva son poignard, et de l'autre il lui dit...")
